= Electoral results for the district of Oakleigh =

Victoria, Australia, district election results

This is a list of electoral results for the Electoral district of Oakleigh in Victorian state elections.

== Members for Oakleigh ==
Member	Party	Term
Squire Reid	Labor	1927–1932
James Vinton Smith	United Australia	1932–1937
Squire Reid	Labor	1937–1947
John Lechte	Liberal	1947–1950
Val Doube	Labor	1950–1961
Alan Scanlan	Liberal	1961–1979
Race Mathews	Labor	1979–1992
Denise McGill	Liberal	1992–1999
Ann Barker	Labor	1999–2014
Steve Dimopoulos	Labor	2014–present

== Election results ==
=== Elections in the 2020s ===
2022 Victorian state election: Oakleigh
Party	Candidate	Votes	%	±%
Labor	Steve Dimopoulos	19,778	45.0	−8.3
Liberal	Jim Grivokostopoulos	12,848	29.3	−0.5
Greens	Hsiang-Han Hsieh	7,278	16.6	+5.2
Independent	Dominique Murphy	1,084	2.5	+2.5
Animal Justice	Loraine Fabb	1,014	2.3	+0.3
Family First	Edward Sok	904	2.1	+2.1
Freedom	Anthony Charles Jacobs	770	1.7	+1.7
Independent	Parashos Kioupelis	234	0.5	+0.5
Total formal votes		43,910	95.6	+1.0
Informal votes		2,000	4.4	−1.0
Turnout		45,910	88.4	+0.6
Two-party-preferred result
Labor	Steve Dimopoulos	27,876	63.5	−2.6
Liberal	Jim Grivokostopoulos	16,034	36.5	+2.6
Labor hold		Swing	−2.6	

=== Elections in the 2010s ===
2018 Victorian state election: Oakleigh
Party	Candidate	Votes	%	±%
Labor	Steve Dimopoulos	19,202	53.57	+7.82
Liberal	Andrew Edmonds	10,946	30.54	−7.74
Greens	Peter Morgan	3,897	10.87	−2.41
Animal Justice	Suzanne Parker	835	2.33	+2.33
Sustainable Australia	Brandon Hoult	594	1.66	+1.66
Independent	Parashos Kioupelis	373	1.04	+0.29
Total formal votes		35,847	95.42	−0.02
Informal votes		1,720	4.58	+0.02
Turnout		37,567	90.32	−1.76
Two-party-preferred result
Labor	Steve Dimopoulos	23,587	65.78	+7.60
Liberal	Andrew Edmonds	12,268	34.22	−7.60
Labor hold		Swing	+7.60	

2014 Victorian state election: Oakleigh
Party	Candidate	Votes	%	±%
Labor	Steve Dimopoulos	15,903	45.8	+4.3
Liberal	Theo Zographos	13,303	38.3	−1.4
Greens	Steven Merriel	4,617	13.3	−1.5
Independent	Anna Scotto	677	1.9	+1.9
Independent	Parashos Kioupelis	260	0.7	+0.7
Total formal votes		34,760	95.4	−0.1
Informal votes		1,662	4.6	+0.1
Turnout		36,422	92.1	+2.4
Two-party-preferred result
Labor	Steve Dimopoulos	20,224	58.2	+3.1
Liberal	Theo Zographos	14,536	41.8	−3.1
Labor hold		Swing	+3.1	

2010 Victorian state election: Oakleigh
Party	Candidate	Votes	%	±%
Labor	Ann Barker	12,888	40.97	−8.87
Liberal	Theo Zographos	12,616	40.11	+6.61
Greens	Eleanor Whyte	4,719	15.00	+1.45
Democratic Labor	Matthew Grinter	488	1.55	+1.55
Family First	George Grigas	423	1.34	−1.76
Independent	Alan Ide	323	1.03	+1.03
Total formal votes		31,457	95.61	−0.74
Informal votes		1,444	4.39	+0.74
Turnout		32,901	92.41	+0.21
Two-party-preferred result
Labor	Ann Barker	17,268	54.82	−7.55
Liberal	Theo Zographos	14,234	45.18	+7.55
Labor hold		Swing	−7.55	

=== Elections in the 2000s ===
2006 Victorian state election: Oakleigh
Party	Candidate	Votes	%	±%
Labor	Ann Barker	15,232	49.8	−4.4
Liberal	Colin Dixon	10,238	33.5	+2.4
Greens	Matthew Billman	4,142	13.6	+2.8
Family First	Joyce Khoo	947	3.1	+3.1
Total formal votes		30,559	96.1	−0.8
Informal votes		1,230	3.9	+0.8
Turnout		31,789	92.2	
Two-party-preferred result
Labor	Ann Barker	19,031	62.4	−2.8
Liberal	Colin Dixon	11,481	37.6	+2.8
Labor hold		Swing	−2.8	

2002 Victorian state election: Oakleigh
Party	Candidate	Votes	%	±%
Labor	Ann Barker	16,999	54.2	+5.0
Liberal	Peter Goudge	9,754	31.1	−14.0
Greens	Ollie Bennett	3,389	10.8	+7.7
Independent	Tina Skouzis	1,193	3.8	+3.8
Total formal votes		31,335	96.9	+0.4
Informal votes		1,000	3.1	−0.4
Turnout		32,335	92.4	
Two-party-preferred result
Labor	Ann Barker	20,432	65.2	+12.3
Liberal	Peter Goudge	10,902	34.8	−12.3
Labor hold		Swing	+12.3	

=== Elections in the 1990s ===
1999 Victorian state election: Oakleigh
Party	Candidate	Votes	%	±%
Labor	Ann Barker	15,060	49.2	+3.4
Liberal	Denise McGill	13,558	44.3	−3.1
Greens	Susan Walters	1,107	3.6	+3.6
Independent	Stephanie McGregor	452	1.5	+1.5
Independent	Loredana Eboli	268	0.9	+0.9
Natural Law	Raymond Schlager	148	0.5	−0.6
Total formal votes		30,593	96.5	−1.1
Informal votes		1,118	3.5	+1.1
Turnout		31,711	92.3	
Two-party-preferred result
Labor	Ann Barker	16,286	53.3	+4.1
Liberal	Denise McGill	14,262	46.7	−4.1
Labor gain from Liberal		Swing	+4.1	

1996 Victorian state election: Oakleigh
Party	Candidate	Votes	%	±%
Liberal	Denise McGill	14,317	47.4	−5.5
Labor	Ann Barker	13,842	45.9	−1.2
Independent	Cameron Nicholls	1,140	3.8	+3.8
Independent	Peter Apostolou	567	1.9	+1.9
Natural Law	David Hamilton	312	1.0	+1.0
Total formal votes		30,178	97.5	+2.0
Informal votes		763	2.5	−2.0
Turnout		30,941	93.1	
Two-party-preferred result
Liberal	Denise McGill	15,309	50.8	−2.1
Labor	Ann Barker	14,815	49.2	+2.1
Liberal hold		Swing	−2.1	

1992 Victorian state election: Oakleigh
Party	Candidate	Votes	%	±%
Liberal	Denise McGill	15,485	52.9	+13.3
Labor	Race Mathews	13,783	47.1	−2.0
Total formal votes		29,268	95.5	+0.0
Informal votes		1,376	4.5	−0.0
Turnout		30,644	94.1	
Liberal gain from Labor		Swing	+8.6	

=== Elections in the 1980s ===
1988 Victorian state election: Oakleigh
Party	Candidate	Votes	%	±%
Labor	Race Mathews	12,645	50.41	−3.40
Liberal	Ian Pope	9,560	38.11	−4.91
Independent	Heather Norling	1,736	6.92	+6.92
Independent	Antonis Pashos	919	3.66	+0.49
Independent	Philip Mitchell	225	0.90	+0.90
Total formal votes		25,085	95.33	−1.82
Informal votes		1,228	4.67	+1.82
Turnout		26,313	91.54	−0.26
Two-party-preferred result
Labor	Race Mathews	14,353	57.26	+2.37
Liberal	Ian Pope	10,715	42.74	−2.37
Labor hold		Swing	+2.37	

1985 Victorian state election: Oakleigh
Party	Candidate	Votes	%	±%
Labor	Race Mathews	14,374	53.8	−0.6
Liberal	Norman Kennedy	11,493	43.0	+5.1
Independent	Antonios Pashos	846	3.2	+3.2
Total formal votes		26,713	97.1	
Informal votes		783	2.9	
Turnout		27,496	91.8	
Two-party-preferred result
Labor	Race Mathews	14,986	56.1	−3.0
Liberal	Norman Kennedy	11,727	43.9	+3.0
Labor hold		Swing	−3.0	

1982 Victorian state election: Oakleigh
Party	Candidate	Votes	%	±%
Labor	Race Mathews	13,801	52.9	+6.6
Liberal	Francis Callaghan	10,227	39.2	−2.0
Democrats	Malcolm Haddrick	1,219	4.7	−2.7
Democratic Labor	John Mulholland	833	3.2	−0.3
Total formal votes		26,080	98.0	+1.0
Informal votes		522	2.0	−1.0
Turnout		26,602	94.5	+1.2
Two-party-preferred result
Labor	Race Mathews	14,585	55.9	+4.2
Liberal	Francis Callaghan	11,495	44.1	−4.2
Labor hold		Swing	+4.2	

=== Elections in the 1970s ===
1979 Victorian state election: Oakleigh
Party	Candidate	Votes	%	±%
Labor	Race Mathews	12,072	46.3	+7.1
Liberal	Alan Scanlan	10,753	41.2	−5.2
Democrats	Domenico Quadara	1,921	7.4	+7.4
Democratic Labor	Elaine Mulholland	910	3.5	+3.5
Australia	David Heath	433	1.7	−2.5
Total formal votes		26,089	97.0	−0.6
Informal votes		816	3.0	+0.6
Turnout		26,905	93.3	−0.1
Two-party-preferred result
Labor	Race Mathews	13,497	51.7	+3.0
Liberal	Alan Scanlan	12,592	48.3	−3.0
Labor gain from Liberal		Swing	+3.0	

1976 Victorian state election: Oakleigh
Party	Candidate	Votes	%	±%
Liberal	Alan Scanlan	12,411	46.4	−2.6
Labor	Sam Papasavas	10,450	39.1	−2.7
Independent	Leslie Kausman	2,766	10.4	+10.4
Australia	Trevor Cooke	1,110	4.2	+2.4
Total formal votes		26,737	97.6	
Informal votes		658	2.4	
Turnout		27,395	93.4	
Two-party-preferred result
Liberal	Alan Scanlan	13,706	51.3	−5.2
Labor	Sam Papasavas	13,031	48.7	+5.2
Liberal hold		Swing	−5.2	

1973 Victorian state election: Oakleigh
Party	Candidate	Votes	%	±%
Liberal	Alan Scanlan	12,070	49.3	+1.5
Labor	Frank Slater	10,383	42.4	+3.0
Democratic Labor	Ralph Cleary	2,011	8.2	−4.7
Total formal votes		24,464	97.1	+0.3
Informal votes		730	2.9	−0.3
Turnout		25,194	94.0	−0.9
Two-party-preferred result
Liberal	Alan Scanlan	13,885	56.8	−1.8
Labor	Frank Slater	10,579	43.2	+1.8
Liberal hold		Swing	−1.8	

1970 Victorian state election: Oakleigh
Party	Candidate	Votes	%	±%
Liberal	Alan Scanlan	11,050	47.8	+1.7
Labor	Anthony Scarcella	9,108	39.4	−1.1
Democratic Labor	Bernard Slattery	2,978	12.9	−0.5
Total formal votes		23,136	96.8	+1.7
Informal votes		753	3.2	−1.7
Turnout		23,889	94.9	−0.2
Two-party-preferred result
Liberal	Alan Scanlan	13,560	58.6	+0.6
Labor	Anthony Scarcella	9,576	41.4	−0.6
Liberal hold		Swing	+0.6	

=== Elections in the 1960s ===
1967 Victorian state election: Oakleigh
Party	Candidate	Votes	%	±%
Liberal	Alan Scanlan	10,598	46.1	+1.8
Labor	Glenn Dudley	9,310	40.5	−0.3
Democratic Labor	Bernard Slattery	3,066	13.4	−0.7
Total formal votes		22,974	97.3	
Informal votes		631	2.7	
Turnout		23,605	95.1	
Two-party-preferred result
Liberal	Alan Scanlan	13,327	58.0	+0.5
Labor	Glenn Dudley	9,647	42.0	−0.5
Liberal hold		Swing	+0.5	

1964 Victorian state election: Oakleigh
Party	Candidate	Votes	%	±%
Liberal and Country	Alan Scanlan	9,935	45.5	+5.6
Labor	Val Doube	8,946	41.0	−4.5
Democratic Labor	Morris Kinnane	2,733	12.5	−2.1
Independent	Jean McKeown	224	1.0	+1.0
Total formal votes		21,838	98.1	−0.3
Informal votes		427	1.9	+0.3
Turnout		22,265	95.4	+0.3
Two-party-preferred result
Liberal and Country	Alan Scanlan	12,559	57.5	+5.0
Labor	Val Doube	9,279	42.5	−5.0
Liberal and Country hold		Swing	+5.0	

1961 Victorian state election: Oakleigh
Party	Candidate	Votes	%	±%
Labor	Val Doube	9,842	45.5	−4.5
Liberal and Country	Alan Scanlan	8,648	39.9	+1.3
Democratic Labor	Morris Kinnane	3,165	14.6	+3.2
Total formal votes		21,655	98.4	−0.4
Informal votes		356	1.6	+0.4
Turnout		22,011	95.1	−0.4
Two-party-preferred result
Liberal and Country	Alan Scanlan	11,360	52.5	+4.2
Labor	Val Doube	10,295	47.5	−4.2
Liberal and Country gain from Labor		Swing	+4.2	

=== Elections in the 1950s ===
1958 Victorian state election: Oakleigh
Party	Candidate	Votes	%	±%
Labor	Val Doube	10,694	50.0	
Liberal and Country	William Downard	8,243	38.6	
Democratic Labor	John Heffernan	2,436	11.4	
Total formal votes		21,373	98.8	
Informal votes		264	1.2	
Turnout		21,637	95.5	
Two-party-preferred result
Labor	Val Doube	11,060	51.7	
Liberal and Country	William Downard	10,313	48.3	
Labor hold		Swing		

1955 Victorian state election: Oakleigh
Party	Candidate	Votes	%	±%
Labor	Val Doube	9,111	49.1	
Liberal and Country	Edmund Fox	7,564	40.8	
Labor (A-C)	Donald Murray	1,874	10.1	
Total formal votes		18,549	98.7	
Informal votes		247	1.3	
Turnout		18,796	95.1	
Two-party-preferred result
Labor	Val Doube	9,377	50.6	
Liberal and Country	Edmund Fox	9,172	49.4	
Labor hold		Swing		

1952 Victorian state election: Oakleigh
Party	Candidate	Votes	%	±%
Labor	Val Doube	17,308	65.5	+19.8
Liberal and Country	Charles Laming	9,135	34.5	+0.1
Total formal votes		26,443	98.5	−0.6
Informal votes		405	1.5	+0.6
Turnout		26,848	94.1	−1.4
Labor hold		Swing	+14.4	

1950 Victorian state election: Oakleigh
Party	Candidate	Votes	%	±%
Labor	Val Doube	11,720	45.7	−3.2
Liberal and Country	Charles Laming	8,833	34.4	−16.7
Independent	John Lechte	5,084	19.8	+19.8
Total formal votes		25,637	99.1	−0.2
Informal votes		230	0.9	+0.2
Turnout		25,867	95.5	+0.6
Two-party-preferred result
Labor	Val Doube	12,820	50.0	+1.1
Liberal and Country	Charles Laming	12,817	50.0	−1.1
Labor gain from Liberal and Country		Swing	+1.1	

=== Elections in the 1940s ===
1947 Victorian state election: Oakleigh
Party	Candidate	Votes	%	±%
Liberal	John Lechte	12,630	51.1	+14.3
Labor	Squire Reid	12,085	48.9	−14.3
Total formal votes		24,715	99.3	+0.4
Informal votes		180	0.7	−0.4
Turnout		24,895	94.9	+5.3
Liberal gain from Labor		Swing	+14.3	

1945 Victorian state election: Oakleigh
Party	Candidate	Votes	%	±%
Labor	Squire Reid	13,683	63.2	
Liberal	James Smith	7,959	36.8	
Total formal votes		21,649	98.9	
Informal votes		229	1.1	
Turnout		21,871	89.6	
Labor hold		Swing		

1943 Victorian state election: Oakleigh
Party	Candidate	Votes	%	±%
Labor	Squire Reid	19,687	58.1	+3.1
United Australia	Andrew Sinclair	14,214	41.9	−3.1
Total formal votes		33,901	98.8	−0.2
Informal votes		396	1.2	+0.2
Turnout		34,297	87.8	−6.8
Labor hold		Swing	+3.1	

1940 Victorian state election: Oakleigh
Party	Candidate	Votes	%	±%
Labor	Squire Reid	17,451	55.0	+2.7
United Australia	Lyston Chisholm	14,287	45.0	−2.7
Total formal votes		31,738	99.0	−0.2
Informal votes		309	1.0	+0.2
Turnout		32,047	94.6	+0.7
Labor hold		Swing	+2.7	

=== Elections in the 1930s ===
1937 Victorian state election: Oakleigh
Party	Candidate	Votes	%	±%
Labor	Squire Reid	15,751	52.3	+2.6
United Australia	James Smith	14,340	47.7	−2.6
Total formal votes		30,091	99.2	+0.3
Informal votes		258	0.8	−0.3
Turnout		30,349	93.9	−0.9
Labor gain from United Australia		Swing	+2.6	

1935 Victorian state election: Oakleigh
Party	Candidate	Votes	%	±%
United Australia	James Vinton Smith	13,978	50.3	+23.9
Labor	Squire Reid	13,813	49.7	+9.4
Total formal votes		27,791	98.9	0.0
Informal votes		272	1.1	0.0
Turnout		28,063	94.8	+0.2
United Australia gain from Independent		Swing	N/A	

1932 Victorian state election: Oakleigh
Party	Candidate	Votes	%	±%
Labor	Squire Reid	10,654	40.3	−16.7
Independent	James Smith	8,794	33.3	+33.3
United Australia	Lyston Chisholm	6,991	26.4	−16.4
Total formal votes		26,439	98.9	−0.3
Informal votes		282	1.1	+0.3
Turnout		26,721	94.6	+0.7
Two-candidate-preferred result
Independent	James Smith	15,002	56.7	+56.7
Labor	Squire Reid	11,437	43.3	−13.7
Independent gain from Labor		Swing	N/A	

=== Elections in the 1920s ===
1929 Victorian state election: Oakleigh
Party	Candidate	Votes	%	±%
Labor	Squire Reid	14,580	57.0	+15.2
Nationalist	Duncan Mackinnon	10,986	43.0	+5.9
Total formal votes		25,566	99.2	+1.3
Informal votes		212	0.8	−1.3
Turnout		25,778	93.9	+0.1
Labor hold		Swing	+6.7	

1927 Victorian state election: Oakleigh
Party	Candidate	Votes	%	±%
Labor	Squire Reid	9,500	41.8	
Nationalist	Robert Knox	8,421	37.1	
Australian Liberal	Thomas Riley	4,786	21.1	
Total formal votes		22,707	97.9	
Informal votes		483	2.1	
Turnout		23,190	93.8	
Two-party-preferred result
Labor	Squire Reid	11,427	50.3	
Nationalist	Robert Knox	11,280	49.7	
Labor gain from Nationalist		Swing		
