= Electoral results for the Division of Casey =

Australian division election results

This is a list of electoral results for the Division of Casey in Australian federal elections from the division's creation in 1969 until the present.

== Members ==
Member	Party	Term
Peter Howson	Liberal	1969–1972
Race Mathews	Labor	1972–1975
Peter Falconer	Liberal	1975–1983
Peter Steedman	Labor	1983–1984
Bob Halverson	Liberal	1984–1998
Michael Wooldridge	Liberal	1998–2001
Tony Smith	Liberal	2001–2022
Aaron Violi	Liberal	2022–present

== Election results ==
=== Elections in the 2020s ===
==== 2025 ====
2025 Australian federal election: Casey
Party	Candidate	Votes	%	±%
Trumpet of Patriots	Phillip Courtis			
One Nation	Ambere Livori			
Animal Justice	Chloe Bond			
Family First	Dan Nebauer			
Greens	Merran Blair			
Labor	Naomi Oakley			
Independent	Claire Ferres Miles			
Liberal	Aaron Violi			
Total formal votes				
Informal votes				
Turnout				

==== 2022 ====
2022 Australian federal election: Casey
Party	Candidate	Votes	%	±%
Liberal	Aaron Violi	36,347	36.49	−8.74
Labor	Bill Brindle	24,779	24.87	−3.78
Greens	Jenny Game	12,894	12.94	+1.99
Independent	Claire Ferres Miles	8,307	8.34	+8.34
United Australia	Anthony Bellve	4,834	4.85	+2.24
Independent Australia One	Craig Cole	3,455	3.47	+3.47
One Nation	Paul Murphy	3,260	3.27	+3.23
Liberal Democrats	Trevor Smith	2,008	2.02	+2.02
Animal Justice	Andrew Klop	1,844	1.85	−1.23
Justice	Peter Sullivan	1,207	1.21	−2.11
Federation	Chris Field	686	0.69	+0.69
Total formal votes		99,621	93.74	+0.18
Informal votes		6,652	6.26	−0.18
Turnout		106,273	93.00	−2.52
Two-party-preferred result
Liberal	Aaron Violi	51,283	51.48	−3.14
Labor	Bill Brindle	48,338	48.52	+3.14
Liberal hold		Swing	−3.14	

Alluvial diagram for preference flows in the seat of Casey in the 2022 federal election. indicates at what stage the winning candidate had over 50% of the votes and was declared the winner.

=== Elections in the 2010s ===
==== 2019 ====
2019 Australian federal election: Casey
Party	Candidate	Votes	%	±%
Liberal	Tony Smith	45,168	45.25	−2.29
Labor	Bill Brindle	28,551	28.60	+0.41
Greens	Jenny Game-Lopata	10,919	10.94	−1.90
Justice	Ryan Clark	3,309	3.31	+2.59
Animal Justice	Travis Barker	3,105	3.11	−1.19
United Australia	Wendy Starkey	2,607	2.61	+2.61
Independent	Peter Charleton	2,302	2.31	−0.32
Democratic Labour	Ross McPhee	2,246	2.25	+2.25
Rise Up Australia	Antony Calabro	820	0.82	−1.63
Great Australian	Jayden O'Connor	801	0.80	+0.80
Total formal votes		99,828	93.54	−2.43
Informal votes		6,892	6.46	+2.43
Turnout		106,720	94.19	+0.54
Two-party-preferred result
Liberal	Tony Smith	54,551	54.64	+0.10
Labor	Bill Brindle	45,277	45.36	−0.10
Liberal hold		Swing	+0.10	

==== 2016 ====
2016 Australian federal election: Casey
Party	Candidate	Votes	%	±%
Liberal	Tony Smith	45,680	49.53	+0.35
Labor	Hovig Melkonian	26,165	28.37	+0.52
Greens	Elissa Sutherland	10,781	11.69	+0.80
Animal Justice	Kristin Bacon	4,176	4.53	+4.53
Independent	Peter Charleton	2,878	3.12	+3.12
Rise Up Australia	Angela Dorian	2,551	2.77	+2.27
Total formal votes		92,231	96.22	+0.84
Informal votes		3,620	3.78	−0.84
Turnout		95,851	93.14	−1.81
Two-party-preferred result
Liberal	Tony Smith	51,703	56.06	−1.11
Labor	Hovig Melkonian	40,528	43.94	+1.11
Liberal hold		Swing	−1.11	

==== 2013 ====
2013 Australian federal election: Casey
Party	Candidate	Votes	%	±%
Liberal	Tony Smith	43,538	49.18	+3.06
Labor	Cathy Farrell	24,651	27.85	−8.71
Greens	Steve Meacher	9,641	10.89	−1.26
Palmer United	Milton Wilde	4,413	4.98	+4.98
Family First	Gary Coombes	2,370	2.68	−2.10
Independent	Jeanette McRae	1,358	1.53	+1.53
Christians	Mike Brown	1,126	1.27	+1.27
Country Alliance	Jeffrey Leake	986	1.11	+1.11
Rise Up Australia	Paul Barbieri	446	0.50	+0.50
Total formal votes		88,529	95.38	−0.23
Informal votes		4,291	4.62	+0.23
Turnout		92,820	95.00	+0.52
Two-party-preferred result
Liberal	Tony Smith	50,615	57.17	+5.31
Labor	Cathy Farrell	37,914	42.83	−5.31
Liberal hold		Swing	+5.31	

==== 2010 ====
2010 Australian federal election: Casey
Party	Candidate	Votes	%	±%
Liberal	Tony Smith	40,588	48.38	−1.77
Labor	Sami Hisheh	29,565	35.24	−0.61
Greens	Brendan Powell	9,661	11.52	+4.20
Family First	Daniel Harrison	4,083	4.87	+0.68
Total formal votes		83,897	95.78	−1.44
Informal votes		3,695	4.22	+1.44
Turnout		87,592	94.84	−1.38
Two-party-preferred result
Liberal	Tony Smith	45,458	54.18	−1.75
Labor	Sami Hisheh	38,439	45.82	+1.75
Liberal hold		Swing	−1.75	

=== Elections in the 2000s ===
==== 2007 ====
2007 Australian federal election: Casey
Party	Candidate	Votes	%	±%
Liberal	Tony Smith	41,897	50.15	−6.12
Labor	Dympna Beard	29,949	35.85	+6.17
Greens	Salore Craig	6,112	7.32	−0.55
Family First	Daniel Harrison	3,501	4.19	+0.14
Democrats	Tony Inglese	1,546	1.85	+0.60
Christian Democrats	George Moran	533	0.64	+0.64
Total formal votes		83,538	97.22	+1.07
Informal votes		2,389	2.78	−1.07
Turnout		85,927	96.21	+0.44
Two-party-preferred result
Liberal	Tony Smith	46,726	55.93	−5.42
Labor	Dympna Beard	36,812	44.07	+5.42
Liberal hold		Swing	−5.42	

==== 2004 ====
2004 Australian federal election: Casey
Party	Candidate	Votes	%	±%
Liberal	Tony Smith	45,050	56.27	+4.98
Labor	Tony Dib	23,762	29.68	−3.58
Greens	Joy Ringrose	6,302	7.87	+0.98
Family First	Andrew Rushton	3,243	4.05	+4.05
Democrats	Jos Vandersman	1,002	1.25	−7.31
	Daniel Chapman	531	0.66	+0.66
Citizens Electoral Council	Jeremy Beck	167	0.21	+0.21
Total formal votes		80,057	96.15	−0.27
Informal votes		3,208	3.85	+0.27
Turnout		83,265	95.77	+0.02
Two-party-preferred result
Liberal	Tony Smith	49,111	61.35	+4.15
Labor	Tony Dib	30,946	38.65	−4.15
Liberal hold		Swing	+4.15	

==== 2001 ====
2001 Australian federal election: Casey
Party	Candidate	Votes	%	±%
Liberal	Tony Smith	40,354	51.26	+4.87
Labor	David McKenzie	26,211	33.29	−0.13
Democrats	Tom Joyce	6,738	8.56	+1.15
Greens	Lorraine Leach	5,424	6.89	+4.68
Total formal votes		78,727	96.42	+0.44
Informal votes		2,922	3.58	−0.44
Turnout		81,649	96.18	
Two-party-preferred result
Liberal	Tony Smith	45,004	57.16	+2.29
Labor	David McKenzie	33,723	42.84	−2.29
Liberal hold		Swing	+2.29	

=== Elections in the 1990s ===
==== 1998 ====
1998 Australian federal election: Casey
Party	Candidate	Votes	%	±%
Liberal	Michael Wooldridge	34,322	46.39	−3.64
Labor	Frank Armenio	24,732	33.42	−2.38
Democrats	John McLaren	5,481	7.41	−2.53
One Nation	Stephen Beck	2,412	3.26	+3.26
Independent	John Mackellar	2,067	2.79	+2.79
Greens	Chris James	1,634	2.21	−1.07
Shooters	Judy Warwick	1,070	1.45	+1.45
Christian Democrats	Basil Smidt	917	1.24	+1.24
Natural Law	Robert Kendi	557	0.75	+0.75
Unity	Gary Smart	405	0.55	+0.55
Independent	Steve Raskovy	396	0.54	+0.54
Total formal votes		73,993	95.98	−1.26
Informal votes		3,098	4.02	+1.26
Turnout		77,091	96.11	−0.55
Two-party-preferred result
Liberal	Michael Wooldridge	40,598	54.87	−1.78
Labor	Frank Armenio	33,395	45.13	+1.78
Liberal hold		Swing	−1.78	

==== 1996 ====
1996 Australian federal election: Casey
Party	Candidate	Votes	%	±%
Liberal	Bob Halverson	35,943	50.03	−0.39
Labor	Des Burns	25,722	35.80	−4.97
Democrats	Glen Maddock	7,140	9.94	+4.58
Greens	Chanel Keane	2,360	3.28	+3.28
Natural Law	Robert Kendi	350	0.49	−0.75
Pensioner and CIR	Basil Smith	332	0.46	+0.46
Total formal votes		71,847	97.24	−0.25
Informal votes		2,037	2.76	+0.25
Turnout		73,884	96.66	−0.06
Two-party-preferred result
Liberal	Bob Halverson	40,479	56.65	+2.49
Labor	Des Burns	30,981	43.35	−2.49
Liberal hold		Swing	+2.49	

==== 1993 ====
1993 Australian federal election: Casey
Party	Candidate	Votes	%	±%
Liberal	Bob Halverson	38,716	52.55	+4.02
Labor	Julie Warren	29,277	39.74	+9.94
Democrats	Sam Ginsberg	4,574	6.21	−8.68
Natural Law	Robert Kendi	1,104	1.50	+1.50
Total formal votes		73,671	97.52	+0.25
Informal votes		1,875	2.48	−0.25
Turnout		75,546	96.72	
Two-party-preferred result
Liberal	Bob Halverson	41,199	55.97	−2.26
Labor	Julie Warren	32,409	44.03	+2.26
Liberal hold		Swing	−2.26	

==== 1990 ====
1990 Australian federal election: Casey
Party	Candidate	Votes	%	±%
Liberal	Bob Halverson	33,006	48.5	+2.7
Labor	Jon Linehan	20,270	29.8	−14.2
Democrats	Paul Rees	10,124	14.9	+7.1
Call to Australia	John Dubbeld	3,718	5.5	+5.5
Independent	Earle Keegel	531	0.8	+0.8
Independent	Basil Smith	361	0.5	+0.5
Total formal votes		68,010	97.3	
Informal votes		1,909	2.7	
Turnout		69,919	96.1	
Two-party-preferred result
Liberal	Bob Halverson	39,540	58.2	+7.9
Labor	Jon Linehan	28,357	41.8	−7.9
Liberal hold		Swing	+7.9	

=== Elections in the 1980s ===
==== 1987 ====
1987 Australian federal election: Casey
Party	Candidate	Votes	%	±%
Liberal	Bob Halverson	30,225	46.7	+2.8
Labor	David McKenzie	27,891	43.1	−1.1
Democrats	Chris Mar	5,071	7.8	+1.3
National	Roy Haffenden	861	1.3	+0.0
Pensioner	Flo Madden	617	1.0	+0.0
Total formal votes		64,665	96.6	
Informal votes		2,257	3.4	
Turnout		66,922	96.2	
Two-party-preferred result
Liberal	Bob Halverson	33,125	51.2	+0.6
Labor	David McKenzie	31,528	48.8	−0.6
Liberal hold		Swing	+0.6	

==== 1984 ====
1984 Australian federal election: Casey
Party	Candidate	Votes	%	±%
Labor	Peter Steedman	25,240	44.2	−1.0
Liberal	Bob Halverson	25,070	43.9	−1.0
Democrats	Michael Nardella	3,709	6.5	−1.0
Democratic Labor	John Garratt	1,744	3.1	+1.9
National	Robert Gray	729	1.3	+1.3
Pensioner	Rosamund Ewan	564	1.0	+1.0
Total formal votes		57,056	93.6	
Informal votes		3,902	6.4	
Turnout		60,958	95.5	
Two-party-preferred result
Liberal	Bob Halverson	28,854	50.6	+0.5
Labor	Peter Steedman	28,193	49.4	−0.5
Liberal gain from Labor		Swing	+0.5	

==== 1983 ====
1983 Australian federal election: Casey
Party	Candidate	Votes	%	±%
Labor	Peter Steedman	34,810	46.0	+6.8
Liberal	Peter Falconer	33,335	44.1	−1.3
Democrats	Michael Nardella	5,646	7.5	−2.8
Christian	Martin Hetherich	931	1.2	+1.2
Democratic Labor	John Garratt	887	1.2	+1.2
Total formal votes		75,609	98.3	
Informal votes		1,390	1.7	
Turnout		76,918	96.2	
Two-party-preferred result
Labor	Peter Steedman	38,312	50.7	+2.6
Liberal	Peter Falconer	37,297	49.3	−2.6
Labor gain from Liberal		Swing	+2.6	

==== 1980 ====
1980 Australian federal election: Casey
Party	Candidate	Votes	%	±%
Liberal	Peter Falconer	31,107	45.4	−2.9
Labor	Peter Watson	26,841	39.2	+8.9
Democrats	Basil Smith	7,032	10.3	−6.4
Independent	Bertram Wainer	2,720	4.0	+4.0
United Christian	Martin Hetherich	563	0.8	+0.8
Independent	Wilfrid Thiele	193	0.3	+0.3
Total formal votes		68,456	97.7	
Informal votes		1,638	2.3	
Turnout		70,094	95.5	
Two-party-preferred result
Liberal	Peter Falconer	35,527	51.9	−8.3
Labor	Peter Watson	32,929	48.1	+8.3
Liberal hold		Swing	−8.3	

=== Elections in the 1970s ===
==== 1977 ====
1977 Australian federal election: Casey
Party	Candidate	Votes	%	±%
Liberal	Peter Falconer	29,896	48.3	−5.9
Labor	Peter Watson	18,772	30.3	−9.4
Democrats	Malcolm Whittle	10,314	16.7	+16.7
Democratic Labor	Francis Feltham	1,761	2.8	−0.3
Independent	Martin Hetherich	694	1.1	+1.1
Independent	Stanley Hillman	343	0.6	+0.6
Independent	Henry Leggett	151	0.2	+0.2
Total formal votes		61,931	97.0	
Informal votes		1,917	3.0	
Turnout		63,848	95.8	
Two-party-preferred result
Liberal	Peter Falconer		60.2	+1.5
Labor	Peter Watson		39.8	−1.5
Liberal hold		Swing	+1.5	

==== 1975 ====
1975 Australian federal election: Casey
Party	Candidate	Votes	%	±%
Liberal	Peter Falconer	39,597	53.0	+9.7
Labor	Race Mathews	30,611	40.9	−8.5
Democratic Labor	John McKenna	2,289	3.1	−0.4
Australia	Murray Deerbon	1,340	1.8	−1.9
Independent	Marc Aussie-Stone	923	1.2	+1.2
Total formal votes		74,760	98.5	
Informal votes		1,113	1.5	
Turnout		75,873	96.6	
Two-party-preferred result
Liberal	Peter Falconer		57.5	+9.0
Labor	Race Mathews		42.5	−9.0
Liberal gain from Labor		Swing	+9.0	

==== 1974 ====
1974 Australian federal election: Casey
Party	Candidate	Votes	%	±%
Labor	Race Mathews	34,409	49.4	+2.5
Liberal	Peter Falconer	30,191	43.3	+4.4
Australia	Clive Champion	2,552	3.7	−0.1
Democratic Labor	John McKenna	2,411	3.5	−3.6
Republican	Joe Schillani	161	0.2	+0.2
Total formal votes		69,724	98.5	
Informal votes		1,055	1.5	
Turnout		70,779	95.5	
Two-party-preferred result
Labor	Race Mathews	35,884	51.5	−0.7
Liberal	Peter Falconer	33,840	48.5	+0.7
Labor hold		Swing	−0.7	

==== 1972 ====
1972 Australian federal election: Casey
Party	Candidate	Votes	%	±%
Labor	Race Mathews	27,845	46.9	+5.9
Liberal	Peter Howson	23,079	38.9	−4.3
Democratic Labor	Kevin Adamson	4,242	7.1	−4.3
Australia	Clive Champion	2,277	3.8	+0.1
Independent	Margaret Briggs	749	1.3	+1.3
Defence of Government Schools	Alfred Andrews	727	1.2	+1.2
Independent	Roderick Matthews	416	0.7	+0.7
Total formal votes		59,335	97.5	
Informal votes		1,523	2.5	
Turnout		60,858	96.4	
Two-party-preferred result
Labor	Race Mathews		52.2	+7.2
Liberal	Peter Howson		47.8	−7.2
Labor gain from Liberal		Swing	+7.2	

=== Elections in the 1960s ===
==== 1969 ====
1969 Australian federal election: Casey
Party	Candidate	Votes	%	±%
Liberal	Peter Howson	21,517	43.2	−5.8
Labor	Duncan Waterson	20,420	41.0	+8.1
Democratic Labor	Kevin Adamson	5,656	11.4	−0.3
Australia	Leonard Weber	1,852	3.7	+3.7
Independent	Joe Schillani	320	0.6	+0.6
Total formal votes		49,765	97.2	
Informal votes		1,442	2.8	
Turnout		51,207	95.2	
Two-party-preferred result
Liberal	Peter Howson	27,390	55.0	−7.8
Labor	Duncan Waterson	22,375	45.0	+7.8
Liberal notional hold		Swing	−7.8	
