= Electorates of the Australian House of Representatives =

Federal electorates in Australia

Map of the 150 electoral divisions to the House of Representatives (blank) in use for the 2025 federal election. ( Interactive map version)

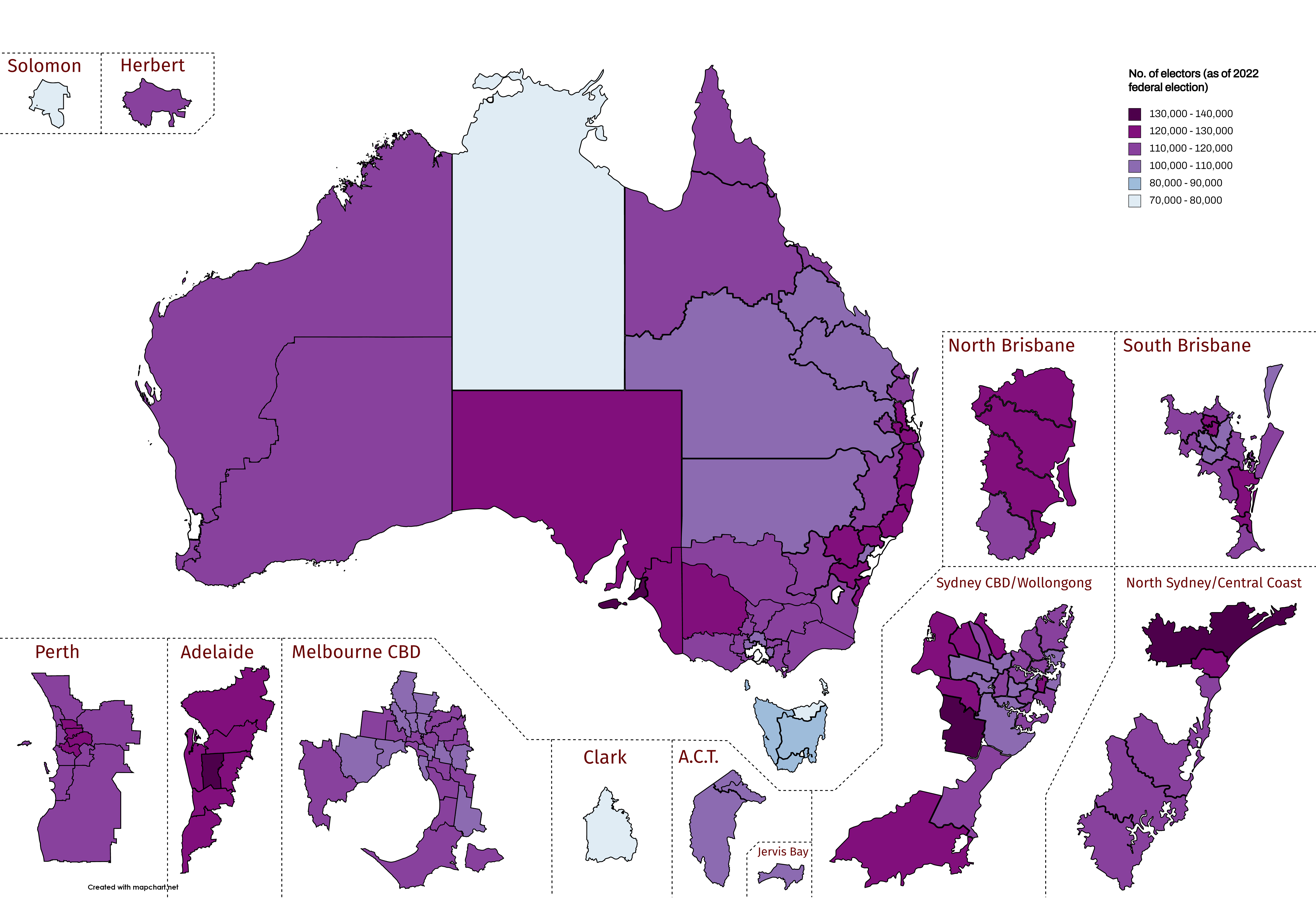
The voting population of each Australian electoral division, as of the 2022 federal election.

Electorates (also known as electoral divisions, federal divisions or seats) are the single-member electoral districts of the Australian House of Representatives; the lower house of the Parliament of Australia. There are currently 150 federal electorates.

== Constitutional and legal requirements ==
Section 24 of the Constitution of Australia specifies that the total number of members of the Australian House of Representatives shall be "as nearly as practicable" twice as many as the number of members of the Australian Senate. The section also requires that electorates be apportioned among the states in proportion to their respective populations; provided that each original state has at least five members in the House of Representatives, a provision that has given Tasmania higher representation than its population would otherwise justify. There are three electorates in the Australian Capital Territory and even though the Northern Territory should have only one electorate based on their population, parliament has legislated that they receive two (by setting the quota for seat allocation using the harmonic mean for territories, meaning only around 1.3 quotas rather than 1.5 quotas are needed to have two seats).

In addition, Section 29 forbids electorate boundaries from crossing state lines, forcing populated areas along state and territory borders to be placed in different electorates, such as Albury in New South Wales being part of the electorate of Farrer, while nearby Wodonga in Victoria is part of the electorate of Indi. The same restriction does not apply to territories, and several current electoral divisions incorporate electors from multiple territories. This is currently the case for the Division of Bean (covering part of the ACT and the whole of Norfolk Island), the Division of Fenner (covering part of the ACT and the whole of Jervis Bay Territory), and the Division of Lingiari (covering part of the Northern Territory and the whole of Christmas Island and Cocos (Keeling) Islands).

The Commonwealth Electoral Act 1918 sets out further provisions.

== Apportionment and redistribution ==
The Australian Electoral Commission (AEC) determines the number of members of the House of Representatives to which each state and territory is entitled (called apportionment) and the boundaries of each electorate, in a process known as redistribution. Such apportionment and redistributions apply to the next federal election, but not to any by-elections. The last apportionment determination was made in July 2023. The resulting redistribution was used in the 2025 federal election.

Within each state and territory, electoral boundaries are redrawn from time to time. This takes place at least once every 7 years, or when the state's entitlement to the number of members of the House of Representatives changes. Boundaries are drawn by a Redistribution Committee, and redistributions within a state are on the basis of the number of enrolled voters, rather than total residents or "population". The number of enrolled voters in each division cannot vary by more than 10% from the average across a state or territory, nor can the number of voters vary by more than 3.5% from the average projected enrolment 3.5 years into the future. However, due to various reasons, larger seats like Cowper in New South Wales contain 80% more electors than that of smaller seats like Solomon in the Northern Territory. In 2018, seats in Victoria, Tasmania and South Australia were also abolished, in order to make way for seats in similar locations but with different names.

At the 2025 Australian federal election, based on the 2023 apportionment, there were 150 divisions: 46 in New South Wales, 38 in Victoria, 30 in Queensland, 16 in Western Australia, 10 in South Australia, five in Tasmania, three in the ACT and two in Northern Territory.

== Naming ==
The divisions of the House of Representatives are unusual in that many of them are not named after geographical features or numbered, as is the case in most other legislatures around the world. Most divisions are named in honour of prominent historical people, such as former politicians (often Prime Ministers), explorers, artists and engineers. The commission is required to make "every effort" to preserve the names of the 75 seats contested at the first election where possible.

In some cases where a division is named after a geographical locality, the connection to that locality is sometimes tenuous. For instance, the Division of Werriwa, created in 1901, was named after the Aboriginal word for Lake George in the Canberra region. However, Werriwa has not contained Lake George for many decades, and has steadily moved some 200 km north to the south-western suburbs of Sydney over the past century.

== List of current electoral divisions ==
The divisions that existed at the 2025 Australian federal election appear in the table below.

Name	Formed	State / Territory	Size (km^{2})	Namesake	Known for	Current Member	Member's party	Classification
Adelaide	1903	South Australia	86	City of Adelaide	Geographic location	Steve Georganas	Labor	Inner-metropolitan
Aston	1984	Victoria	124	Tilly Aston	Teacher	Mary Doyle	Labor	Outer-metropolitan
Ballarat	1901	Victoria	5,323	City of Ballarat	Geographic location	Catherine King	Labor	Provincial
Banks	1949	New South Wales	61	Joseph Banks	Botanist	Zhi Soon	Labor	Inner-metropolitan
Barker	1903	South Australia	65,206	Collet Barker	Explorer	Tony Pasin	Liberal	Rural
Barton	1922	New South Wales	42	Edmund Barton	Prime Minister	Ash Ambihaipahar	Labor	Inner-metropolitan
Bass	1903	Tasmania	7,975	George Bass	Explorer	Jess Teesdale	Labor	Provincial
Bean	2019	Australian Capital Territory; Norfolk Island	1,913	Charles Bean	War correspondent, historian	David Smith	Labor	Inner-metropolitan
Bendigo	1901	Victoria	6,178	City of Bendigo	Geographic location	Lisa Chesters	Labor	Provincial
Bennelong	1949	New South Wales	60	Bennelong	Aboriginal elder	Jerome Laxale	Labor	Inner-metropolitan
Berowra	1969	New South Wales	751	Suburb of Berowra	Geographic location	Julian Leeser	Liberal	Outer-metropolitan
Blair	1998	Queensland	6,472	Harold Blair	Aboriginal singer	Shayne Neumann	Labor	Provincial
Blaxland	1949	New South Wales	59	Gregory Blaxland	Explorer	Jason Clare	Labor	Inner-metropolitan
Bonner	2004	Queensland	374	Neville Bonner	Aboriginal politician	Kara Cook	Labor	Outer-metropolitan
Boothby	1903	South Australia	115	William Boothby	Electoral commissioner	Louise Miller-Frost	Labor	Outer-metropolitan
Bowman	1949	Queensland	536	David Bowman	Politician	Henry Pike	Liberal National	Outer-metropolitan
Braddon	1955	Tasmania	21,369	Edward Braddon	Premier of Tasmania	Anne Urquhart	Labor	Rural
Bradfield	1949	New South Wales	105	John Bradfield	Designer of the Sydney Harbour Bridge	Nicolette Boele	Independent	Inner-metropolitan
Brand	1984	Western Australia	309	David Brand	Premier of Western Australia	Madeleine King	Labor	Outer-metropolitan
Brisbane	1901	Queensland	57	City of Brisbane	Geographic location	Madonna Jarrett	Labor	Inner-metropolitan
Bruce	1955	Victoria	142	Stanley Bruce	Prime Minister	Julian Hill	Labor	Outer-metropolitan
Bullwinkel	2025	Western Australia	9,508	Vivian Bullwinkel	Military nurse	Trish Cook	Labor	Outer-metropolitan
Burt	2016	Western Australia	222	Archibald, Septimus and Francis Burt	Family of lawyers	Matt Keogh	Labor	Outer-metropolitan
Calare	1906	New South Wales	32,648	Aboriginal name for the Lachlan River	Geographic location	Andrew Gee	Independent	Rural
Calwell	1984	Victoria	191	Arthur Calwell	Leader of the opposition	Basem Abdo	Labor	Outer-metropolitan
Canberra	1974	Australian Capital Territory	312	City of Canberra	Geographic location	Alicia Payne	Labor	Inner-metropolitan
Canning	1949	Western Australia	3,608	Alfred Canning	Surveyor of the Rabbit-Proof Fence	Andrew Hastie	Liberal	Outer-metropolitan
Capricornia	1901	Queensland	90,903	Tropic of Capricorn	Geographic location	Michelle Landry	Liberal National	Provincial
Casey	1969	Victoria	2,624	Richard Casey	Governor-General	Aaron Violi	Liberal	Rural
Chifley	1969	New South Wales	113	Ben Chifley	Prime Minister	Ed Husic	Labor	Outer-metropolitan
Chisholm	1949	Victoria	73	Caroline Chisholm	Philanthropist	Carina Garland	Labor	Inner-metropolitan
Clark	2019	Tasmania	292	Andrew Inglis Clark	Co-author of the Australian Constitution	Andrew Wilkie	Independent	Inner-metropolitan
Cook	1969	New South Wales	67	Joseph and James Cook	Prime Minister and explorer	Simon Kennedy	Liberal	Inner-metropolitan
Cooper	2019	Victoria	61	William Cooper	Aboriginal activist	Ged Kearney	Labor	Inner-metropolitan
Corangamite	1901	Victoria	640	Lake Corangamite	Geographic location	Libby Coker	Labor	Provincial
Corio	1901	Victoria	1,216	Corio Bay	Geographic location	Richard Marles	Labor	Provincial
Cowan	1984	Western Australia	108	Edith Cowan	Politician, activist	Anne Aly	Labor	Inner-metropolitan
Cowper	1901	New South Wales	7,271	Charles Cowper	Premier of New South Wales	Pat Conaghan	Nationals	Provincial
Cunningham	1949	New South Wales	536	Allan Cunningham	Botanist, explorer	Alison Byrnes	Labor	Provincial
Curtin	1949	Western Australia	92	John Curtin	Prime Minister	Kate Chaney	Independent	Inner-metropolitan
Dawson	1949	Queensland	14,630	Anderson Dawson	Premier of Queensland	Andrew Willcox	Liberal National	Rural
Deakin	1937	Victoria	98	Alfred Deakin	Prime Minister	Matt Gregg	Labor	Outer-metropolitan
Dickson	1992	Queensland	724	James Dickson	Premier of Queensland	Ali France	Labor	Outer-metropolitan
Dobell	1984	New South Wales	675	William Dobell	Painter	Emma McBride	Labor	Provincial
Dunkley	1984	Victoria	148	Louisa Margaret Dunkley	Labour unionist, women's rights campaigner	Jodie Belyea	Labor	Outer-metropolitan
Durack	2010	Western Australia	1,410,947	Patrick, W. J., Michael, Mary, Elizabeth, Kimberley and Peter Durack	Pioneers and developers of the Kimberley region	Melissa Price	Liberal	Rural
Eden-Monaro	1901	New South Wales	31,913	Town of Eden and region of Monaro	Geographic location	Kristy McBain	Labor	Rural
Fadden	1977	Queensland	387	Arthur Fadden	Prime Minister	Cameron Caldwell	Liberal National	Outer-metropolitan
Fairfax	1984	Queensland	1,004	Ruth Fairfax	Founder of the Country Women's Association	Ted O'Brien	Liberal National	Rural
Farrer	1949	New South Wales	126,563	William Farrer	Scientist	David Farley	One Nation	Rural
Fenner	2016	Australian Capital Territory; Jervis Bay Territory	238	Frank Fenner	Scientist	Andrew Leigh	Labor	Inner-metropolitan
Fisher	1949	Queensland	1,198	Andrew Fisher	Prime Minister	Andrew Wallace	Liberal National	Rural
Flinders	1901	Victoria	887	Matthew Flinders	Explorer	Zoe McKenzie	Liberal	Rural
Flynn	2006	Queensland	132,824	John Flynn	Founder of the Royal Flying Doctor Service	Colin Boyce	Liberal National	Rural
Forde	1984	Queensland	418	Frank Forde	Prime Minister	Rowan Holzberger	Labor	Outer-metropolitan
Forrest	1922	Western Australia	6,454	John Forrest	Explorer, Premier of Western Australia	Ben Small	Liberal	Rural
Fowler	1984	New South Wales	62	Lilian Fowler	Mayor of Newtown	Dai Le	Independent	Outer-metropolitan
Franklin	1903	Tasmania	10,009	John Franklin	Explorer	Julie Collins	Labor	Outer-metropolitan
Fraser	2019	Victoria	98	Malcolm Fraser	Prime Minister	Daniel Mulino	Labor	Inner-metropolitan
Fremantle	1901	Western Australia	191	City of Fremantle	Geographic location	Josh Wilson	Labor	Inner-metropolitan
Gellibrand	1949	Victoria	144	Joseph Gellibrand	Attorney-General of Tasmania	Tim Watts	Labor	Inner-metropolitan
Gilmore	1984	New South Wales	6,322	Mary Gilmore	Poet, author	Fiona Phillips	Labor	Rural
Gippsland	1901	Victoria	33,131	Region of Gippsland	Geographic location	Darren Chester	Nationals	Rural
Goldstein	1984	Victoria	56	Vida Goldstein	Suffragette	Tim Wilson	Liberal	Inner-metropolitan
Gorton	2004	Victoria	207	John Gorton	Prime Minister	Alice Jordan-Baird	Labor	Outer-metropolitan
Grayndler	1949	New South Wales	34	Edward Grayndler	Politician, unionist	Anthony Albanese	Labor	Inner-metropolitan
Greenway	1984	New South Wales	90	Francis Greenway	Architect	Michelle Rowland	Labor	Outer-metropolitan
Grey	1903	South Australia	908,595	George Grey	Governor of South Australia	Tom Venning	Liberal	Rural
Griffith	1934	Queensland	57	Samuel Griffith	Premier of Queensland, Chief Justice of Australia	Renee Coffey	Labor	Inner-metropolitan
Groom	1984	Queensland	5,586	Littleton Groom	Politician	Garth Hamilton	Liberal National	Provincial
Hasluck	2001	Western Australia	258	Paul and Alexandra Hasluck	Governor-General and author	Tania Lawrence	Labor	Outer-metropolitan
Hawke	2022	Victoria	1,986	Bob Hawke	Prime Minister	Sam Rae	Labor	Provincial
Herbert	1901	Queensland	941	Robert Herbert	Premier of Queensland	Phillip Thompson	Liberal National	Provincial
Hindmarsh	1903	South Australia	122	John Hindmarsh	Governor of South Australia	Mark Butler	Labor	Inner-metropolitan
Hinkler	1984	Queensland	3,818	Bert Hinkler	Aviator	David Batt	Liberal National	Provincial
Holt	1969	Victoria	252	Harold Holt	Prime Minister	Cassandra Fernando	Labor	Outer-metropolitan
Hotham	1969	Victoria	81	Charles Hotham	Governor of Victoria	Clare O'Neil	Labor	Inner-metropolitan
Hughes	1955	New South Wales	380	Billy Hughes	Prime Minister	David Moncrieff	Labor	Outer-metropolitan
Hume	1901	New South Wales	2,674	Hamilton Hume	Explorer	Angus Taylor	Liberal	Outer-metropolitan
Hunter	1901	New South Wales	7,253	John Hunter	Governor of New South Wales	Dan Repacholi	Labor	Rural
Indi	1901	Victoria	29,188	Aboriginal name for the Murray River	Geographic location	Helen Haines	Independent	Rural
Isaacs	1969	Victoria	158	Isaac Isaacs	Governor-General, Chief Justice of Australia	Mark Dreyfus	Labor	Outer-metropolitan
Jagajaga	1984	Victoria	137	Three Wurundjeri elders	Aboriginal elders	Kate Thwaites	Labor	Outer-metropolitan
Kennedy	1901	Queensland	567,377	Edmund Kennedy	Explorer	Bob Katter	Katter's Australian	Rural
Kingsford Smith	1949	New South Wales	61	Charles Kingsford Smith	Aviator	Matt Thistlethwaite	Labor	Inner-metropolitan
Kingston	1949	South Australia	165	Charles Kingston	Premier of South Australia	Amanda Rishworth	Labor	Outer-metropolitan
Kooyong	1901	Victoria	59	Suburb of Kooyong	Geographic location	Monique Ryan	Independent	Inner-metropolitan
La Trobe	1949	Victoria	1,303	Charles La Trobe	Governor of Victoria	Jason Wood	Liberal	Provincial
Lalor	1949	Victoria	180	Peter Lalor	Leader of the Eureka Rebellion	Joanne Ryan	Labor	Outer-metropolitan
Leichhardt	1949	Queensland	148,559	Ludwig Leichhardt	Explorer	Matt Smith	Labor	Rural
Lilley	1913	Queensland	144	Charles Lilley	Premier, Chief Justice of Queensland	Anika Wells	Labor	Inner-metropolitan
Lindsay	1984	New South Wales	325	Norman Lindsay	Artist	Melissa McIntosh	Liberal	Outer-metropolitan
Lingiari	2001	Northern Territory; Christmas Island; Cocos (Keeling) Islands	1,348,073	Vincent Lingiari	Aboriginal activist	Marion Scrymgour	Labor	Rural
Longman	1996	Queensland	1,237	Irene Longman	Politician	Terry Young	Liberal National	Provincial
Lyne	1949	New South Wales	16,041	William Lyne	Premier of New South Wales	Alison Penfold	Nationals	Rural
Lyons	1984	Tasmania	35,721	Joseph and Enid Lyons	Prime Minister and politician	Rebecca White	Labor	Rural
Macarthur	1949	New South Wales	307	John and Elizabeth Macarthur	Pioneers of early settlement	Mike Freelander	Labor	Outer-metropolitan
Mackellar	1949	New South Wales	222	Charles and Dorothea Mackellar	Politician and poet	Sophie Scamps	Independent	Outer-metropolitan
Macnamara	2019	Victoria	38	Jean Macnamara	Scientist	Josh Burns	Labor	Inner-metropolitan
Macquarie	1901	New South Wales	4,387	Lachlan Macquarie	Governor of New South Wales	Susan Templeman	Labor	Provincial
Makin	1984	South Australia	162	Norman Makin	Politician	Tony Zappia	Labor	Outer-metropolitan
Mallee	1949	Victoria	83,412	Mallee Region	Geographic location	Anne Webster	Nationals	Rural
Maranoa	1901	Queensland	729,897	Maranoa River	Geographic location	David Littleproud	Liberal National	Rural
Maribyrnong	1906	Victoria	70	Maribyrnong River	Geographic location	Jo Briskey	Labor	Inner-metropolitan
Mayo	1984	South Australia	9,135	Helen Mayo	Doctor	Rebekha Sharkie	Centre Alliance	Rural
McEwen	1984	Victoria	2,288	John McEwen	Prime Minister	Rob Mitchell	Labor	Rural
McMahon	2010	New South Wales	179	William McMahon	Prime Minister	Chris Bowen	Labor	Outer-metropolitan
McPherson	1949	Queensland	229	McPherson Range	Geographic location	Leon Rebello	Liberal National	Provincial
Melbourne	1901	Victoria	39	City of Melbourne	Geographic location	Sarah Witty	Labor	Inner-metropolitan
Menzies	1984	Victoria	102	Robert Menzies	Prime Minister	Gabriel Ng	Labor	Outer-metropolitan
Mitchell	1949	New South Wales	79	Thomas Mitchell	Explorer	Alex Hawke	Liberal	Outer-metropolitan
Monash	2019	Victoria	8,255	John Monash	General, military commander	Mary Aldred	Liberal	Rural
Moncrieff	1984	Queensland	100	Gladys Moncrieff	Singer	Angie Bell	Liberal National	Provincial
Moore	1949	Western Australia	102	George Fletcher Moore	Early settler of Western Australia	Tom French	Labor	Outer-metropolitan
Moreton	1901	Queensland	109	Moreton Bay	Geographic location	Julie-Ann Campbell	Labor	Inner-metropolitan
New England	1901	New South Wales	75,237	Region of New England	Geographic location	Barnaby Joyce	One Nation	Rural
Newcastle	1901	New South Wales	159	City of Newcastle	Geographic location	Sharon Claydon	Labor	Provincial
Nicholls	2019	Victoria	14,116	Douglas and Gladys Nicholls	Aboriginal activists	Sam Birrell	Nationals	Rural
O'Connor	1980	Western Australia	1,093,790	C. Y. O'Connor	Engineer	Rick Wilson	Liberal	Rural
Oxley	1949	Queensland	159	John Oxley	Explorer	Milton Dick	Labor	Outer-metropolitan
Page	1984	New South Wales	19,335	Earle Page	Prime Minister	Kevin Hogan	Nationals	Rural
Parkes	1984	New South Wales	406,755	Henry Parkes	Premier of New South Wales	Jamie Chaffey	Nationals	Rural
Parramatta	1901	New South Wales	66	Suburb of Parramatta	Geographic location	Andrew Charlton	Labor	Inner-metropolitan
Paterson	1949, 1993	New South Wales	948	Banjo Paterson	Author, poet	Meryl Swanson	Labor	Provincial
Pearce	1989	Western Australia	755	George Pearce	Politician	Tracey Roberts	Labor	Outer-metropolitan
Perth	1901	Western Australia	69	City of Perth	Geographic location	Patrick Gorman	Labor	Inner-metropolitan
Petrie	1949	Queensland	152	Andrew Petrie	Architect	Emma Comer	Labor	Outer-metropolitan
Rankin	1984	Queensland	131	Annabelle Rankin	Politician	Jim Chalmers	Labor	Outer-metropolitan
Reid	1922	New South Wales	49	George Reid	Prime Minister	Sally Sitou	Labor	Inner-metropolitan
Richmond	1901	New South Wales	2,133	Richmond River	Geographic location	Justine Elliot	Labor	Rural
Riverina	1901, 1993	New South Wales	52,410	Riverina region	Geographic location	Michael McCormack	Nationals	Rural
Robertson	1901	New South Wales	939	John Robertson	Premier of New South Wales	Gordon Reid	Labor	Provincial
Ryan	1949	Queensland	370	T. J. Ryan	Premier of Queensland	Elizabeth Watson-Brown	Greens	Outer-metropolitan
Scullin	1968	Victoria	174	James Scullin	Prime Minister	Andrew Giles	Labor	Outer-metropolitan
Shortland	1949	New South Wales	204	John Shortland	Explorer	Pat Conroy	Labor	Provincial
Solomon	2000	Northern Territory	211	Vaiben Louis Solomon	Premier of South Australia	Luke Gosling	Labor	Inner-metropolitan
Spence	2019	South Australia	532	Catherine Helen Spence	Politician, author	Matt Burnell	Labor	Outer-metropolitan
Sturt	1949	South Australia	97	Charles Sturt	Explorer	Claire Clutterham	Labor	Inner-metropolitan
Swan	1901	Western Australia	124	Swan River	Geographic location	Zaneta Mascarenhas	Labor	Inner-metropolitan
Sydney	1968	New South Wales	45	City of Sydney	Geographic location	Tanya Plibersek	Labor	Inner-metropolitan
Tangney	1974	Western Australia	97	Dorothy Tangney	Politician	Sam Lim	Labor	Inner-metropolitan
Wannon	1901	Victoria	34,270	Wannon River	Geographic location	Dan Tehan	Liberal	Rural
Warringah	1922	New South Wales	51	Warringah Council	Geographic location	Zali Steggall	Community Strong	Inner-metropolitan
Watson	1992	New South Wales	51	Chris Watson	Prime Minister	Tony Burke	Labor	Inner-metropolitan
Wentworth	1901	New South Wales	31	William Wentworth	Explorer	Allegra Spender	Community Strong	Inner-metropolitan
Werriwa	1901	New South Wales	111	Aboriginal name for Lake George	Geographic location	Anne Stanley	Labor	Outer-metropolitan
Whitlam	2016	New South Wales	2,996	Gough Whitlam	Prime Minister	Carol Berry	Labor	Provincial
Wide Bay	1901	Queensland	14,227	Region of Wide Bay–Burnett	Geographic location	Llew O'Brien	Liberal National	Rural
Wills	1949	Victoria	47	William John Wills	Explorer	Peter Khalil	Labor	Inner-metropolitan
Wright	2009	Queensland	7,577	Judith Wright	Poet, environmentalist	Scott Buchholz	Liberal National	Rural

== Abolished divisions ==
These divisions no longer exist:

Name	Formed	Abolished	State	Namesake	Known for
Angas (I)	1903	1934	SA	George Fife Angas	Businessman, banker
Angas (II)	1949	1977	SA	George Fife Angas	Businessman, banker
Australian Capital Territory	1949	1974	ACT	Australian Capital Territory	Geographic location
Balaclava	1901	1984	Vic	Suburb of Balaclava	Geographic location
Barrier	1901	1922	NSW	Barrier Ranges	Geographic location
Batman	1906	2019	Vic	John Batman	Founder of Melbourne
Bland	1901	1906	NSW	William Bland	Doctor
Bonython	1955	2004	SA	John Langdon Bonython	Editor, newspaper proprietor
Bourke	1901	1949	Vic	Richard Bourke	Governor of NSW
Burke (I)	1949	1955	Vic	Robert O'Hara Burke	Explorer
Burke (II)	1969	2004	Vic	Robert O'Hara Burke	Explorer
Canobolas	1901	1906	NSW	Mount Canobolas	Geographic location
Charlton	1984	2016	NSW	Matthew Charlton	Politician
Cook (I)	1906	1955	NSW	James Cook	Explorer
Coolgardie	1901	1913	WA	Town of Coolgardie	Geographic location
Corinella (I)	1901	1906	Vic	Corinella Gold Mining Region	Geographic location
Corinella (II)	1990	1996	Vic	Town of Corinella	Geographic location
Dalley	1901	1969	NSW	William Bede Dalley	Politician, barrister
Dampier	1913	1922	WA	William Dampier	Explorer
Darebin	1949	1969	Vic	Darebin Creek	Geographic location
Darling	1901	1977	NSW	Darling River	Geographic location
Darling Downs	1901	1984	Qld	Region of Darling Downs	Geographic location
Darwin	1903	1955	Tas	Charles Darwin	Scientist
Denison	1903	2019	Tas	William Denison	Governor of Van Diemen's Land and New South Wales
Diamond Valley	1969	1984	Vic	Diamond Creek	Geographic location
Dundas	1977	1993	NSW	Henry Dundas	Scottish politician, aristocrat
East Sydney	1901	1969	NSW	East Sydney	Geographic location
Echuca	1901	1937	Vic	Town of Echuca	Geographic location
Evans	1949	1977	NSW	George Evans	Explorer
Fawkner	1906	1969	Vic	John Pascoe Fawkner	Pioneer
Fraser (I)	1974	2016	ACT	Jim Fraser	Politician
Grampians	1901	1922	Vic	Grampians Ranges	Geographic location
Gwydir	1901	2007	NSW	Gwydir River	Geographic location
Hawker	1969	1993	SA	Charles Hawker	Politician
Henty	1913	1990	Vic	Henty family	Pioneers
Higgins	1949	2025	VIC	Henry Bournes Higgins	Politician, High Court judge
Higinbotham	1949	1969	Vic	George Higinbotham	Chief Justice of Victoria
Hoddle	1949	1955	Vic	Robert Hoddle	Surveyor, artist
Illawarra	1901	1922	NSW	Illawarra region	Geographic location
Isaacs (I)	1949	1969	Vic	Isaac Isaacs	Governor-General, Chief Justice of Australia
Kalgoorlie	1901	2010	WA	City of Kalgoorlie	Geographic location
Laanecoorie	1901	1913	Vic	Town of Laanecoorie	Geographic location
Lang	1901	1977	NSW	John Dunmore Lang	Politician, activist
Lawson	1949	1969	NSW	Henry Lawson	Writer, poet
Lowe	1949	2010	NSW	Robert Lowe	British statesman
Martin	1922	1955	NSW	James Martin	Premier, Chief Justice of New South Wales
McMillan	1949	2019	Vic	Angus McMillan	Pioneer
Melbourne Ports	1901	2019	Vic	Suburb of Port Melbourne	Geographic location
Mernda	1901	1913	Vic	Town of Mernda	Geographic location
Moira	1901	1906	Vic	Shire of Moira	Geographic location
Murray	1949	2019	Vic	Murray River	Geographic location
Namadgi	1996	1998	ACT	Namadgi National Park	Geographic location
Nepean	1906	1922	NSW	Evan Nepean	British politician
North Sydney	1901	2025	NSW	Suburb of North Sydney	Geographic location
Northern Melbourne	1901	1906	Vic	Suburb of North Melbourne	Geographic location
Northern Territory	1922	2001	NT	Northern Territory	Geographic location
Oxley (I)	1901	1934	Qld	John Oxley	Explorer
Parkes (I)	1901	1969	NSW	Henry Parkes	Premier of NSW
Phillip	1949	1993	NSW	Arthur Phillip	Governor of New South Wales
Port Adelaide	1949	2019	SA	Suburb of Port Adelaide	Geographic location
Prospect	1969	2010	NSW	Prospect Reservoir	Geographic location
Riverina-Darling	1984	1993	NSW	Riverina region and the Darling River	Geographic location
Scullin (I)	1955	1969	Vic	James Scullin	Prime Minister
South Australia	1901	1903	SA	South Australia	Geographic location
South Sydney	1901	1934	NSW	Area of Southern Sydney	Geographic location
Southern Melbourne	1901	1906	Vic	Suburb of South Melbourne	Geographic location
Streeton	1984	1990	Vic	Arthur Streeton	Painter
Stirling	1955	2022	WA	James Stirling	Governor of Western Australia
St George	1949	1993	NSW	St George region	Geographic location
Tasmania	1901	1903	Tas	Tasmania	Geographic location
Throsby	1984	2016	NSW	Charles Throsby	Explorer
Wakefield	1903	2019	SA	Edward Gibbon Wakefield	Pioneer
Watson (I)	1934	1969	NSW	Chris Watson	Prime Minister
West Sydney	1901	1969	NSW	Area of Western Sydney	Geographic location
Wilmot	1903	1984	Tas	Sir John Eardley-Wilmot	Lieutenant-Governor of Van Diemen's Land
Wimmera	1901	1977	Vic	Wimmera region	Geographic location
Yarra	1901	1969	Vic	Yarra River	Geographic location

== See also ==
- List of members of the Australian House of Representatives
- Australian electoral system
