= Tony Smith (Victorian politician) =

Australian politician (born 1967)

The Honourable Tony Smith
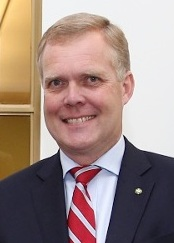
- Smith in 2017

30th Speaker of the Australian House of Representatives
- In office 10 August 2015 – 23 November 2021
- Deputy: Bruce Scott; Mark Coulton; Kevin Hogan; Llew O'Brien
- Preceded by: Bronwyn Bishop
- Succeeded by: Andrew Wallace

Member of the Australian Parliament for Casey
- In office 10 November 2001 – 11 April 2022
- Preceded by: Michael Wooldridge
- Succeeded by: Aaron Violi

Personal details
- Born: Anthony David Hawthorn Smith; 13 March 1967 (age 59) Melbourne, Victoria, Australia
- Party: Liberal
- Spouse: Pam Smith
- Children: 2
- Education: Carey Baptist Grammar School
- Alma mater: University of Melbourne
- Occupation: Political adviser

Anthony David Hawthorn Smith (born 13 March 1967) is an Australian politician who served as the 30th speaker of the House of Representatives from 2015 to 2021. A member of the Liberal Party of Australia, he was the Member of Parliament (MP) for the division of Casey from 2001 until he stood down in 2022.

== Early life ==
Smith was born in Melbourne on 13 March 1967. He is the youngest of three children born to Noel Patricia (née Bickford) and Alan Leslie Hawthorn Smith. His mother worked as a medical secretary and his father as a chemistry teacher.

Smith attended Kerrimuir Primary School in Box Hill North and Carey Baptist Grammar School in Kew. He went on to study history and politics the University of Melbourne, graduating Bachelor of Arts (Hons.) in 1990 and Bachelor of Commerce in 1992. He was president of the Melbourne University Liberal Club and while at university worked as a cook, rowing coach and history tutor.

== Political adviser ==
Smith was state president of the Australian Liberal Students' Federation in 1989. In the same year he began working part-time as a research assistant at the Institute of Public Affairs, writing for the IPA Review. He served as president of the Liberal Party's Box Hill North branch from 1990 to 1995.

Prior to the 1990 federal election, Smith joined the campaign of Peter Costello, the newly endorsed Liberal candidate for the Melbourne seat of Higgins. He worked for Costello for a decade, filling various roles including researcher, press secretary and senior political adviser during Costello's ascension from backbench MP to shadow cabinet minister to federal treasurer after the Coalition's 1996 election victory. He reportedly played a key role in developing the Liberal Party's case against Labor minister Ros Kelly during the sports rorts affair and later advised on the Howard government's introduction of the goods and services tax.

== Parliamentary politics ==
Smith first sought to enter parliament at the 1998 election, standing unsuccessfully for Liberal preselection in the seat of Casey. He was defeated in the ballot by incumbent Howard government minister Michael Wooldridge, who was transferring from a marginal seat. Smith was elected to the House of Representatives at the 2001 election, retaining Casey for the Liberal Party after Wooldridge's retirement. He was re-elected in 2004.

On 23 January 2007, Smith was appointed Parliamentary Secretary to the Prime Minister, John Howard. He managed to hold his seat of Casey by a considerable margin at the federal election in November of that year, although the Liberal-National Coalition was defeated. On 22 September 2008, Smith was appointed Shadow Assistant Treasurer by Opposition Leader Malcolm Turnbull. Smith had previously been Shadow Minister for Education, Apprenticeships and Training. He was appointed Shadow Minister for Communications in a reshuffle which took place on 8 December 2009.

When Malcolm Turnbull's hold on the Liberal leadership became terminal, it was speculated that Smith was part of a "two-Tony" ticket in which Smith would be the running mate of Tony Abbott in a leadership challenge. Although Abbott successfully challenged Turnbull for the Liberal leadership on 1 December 2009, Smith was not Abbott's running mate, and Julie Bishop remained deputy under Abbott.

Despite the speculation that they would make a leadership team in 2009, Abbott and Smith do not seem to be close as Abbott demoted Smith after the 2010 election. When Smith sought the speakership in 2015, it is understood that Abbott as Prime Minister backed rival contender Russell Broadbent as the Government's candidate for Speaker over Smith. In 2015, The Daily Telegraph reported that there was an "internal view" in the Liberal Party that Abbott blamed Smith for the Coalition's narrow loss at the 2010 election due to Smith's perceived mishandling of the Coalition's broadband policy when Shadow Communications Minister.

In the new Abbott shadow ministry announced after the August 2010 election, Smith was appointed Shadow Parliamentary Secretary for Tax Reform and Deputy chairman, Coalition Policy Development Committee.

He was interviewed extensively in the ABC documentary The Howard Years. On 14 July 2021 Smith issued a statement saying he would retire as Member for Casey at the end of the 46th Parliament.

=== Speaker of the House ===
Following the resignation of Bronwyn Bishop as Speaker of the House of Representatives in August 2015 over entitlement rorts dating back a decade, the Liberal Party nominated Smith as the party's candidate to replace Bishop. The House of Representatives elected Smith unopposed. He pledged to absent himself from the Liberal party room for the duration of his speakership to protect the neutrality of the chair. He also eschewed the traditional full attire of the Speaker, instead continuing to wear an ordinary business suit. He was the second member for Casey to be elected as Speaker in just under 20 years, after Bob Halverson.

Smith was re-elected Speaker unopposed after the 2016 and 2019 federal elections. He was the first Speaker to be elected unopposed on three occasions since Frederick Holder, the inaugural holder of the position. Due to his upcoming retirement from parliament, Smith resigned as Speaker on 23 November 2021.

== Post-politics ==
As of July 2025, Smith is working with the Australian American Leadership Dialogue as chief executive.

Parliament of Australia
Preceded by Bronwyn Bishop	Speaker of the Australian House of Representatives; 2015–2021	Succeeded by Andrew Wallace
Preceded by Michael Wooldridge	Member for Casey; 2001–2022	Succeeded by Aaron Violi
