= Members of the Australian House of Representatives, 2025–2028 =

- ←2022–2025 2028–2031→

This is a list of members of the House of Representatives of the 48th Parliament of Australia. They were elected in the 2025 Australian federal election.

== Leadership ==
=== Presiding officer ===
| Office | Party | Officer | Electorate | State | Term |
|---|---|---|---|---|---|
| Speaker | Labor | Milton Dick | Oxley | QLD | 26 July 2022 – current |
| Deputy Speaker | Labor | Sharon Claydon | Newcastle | NSW | 26 July 2022 – current |
| Second Deputy Speaker | Liberal | Terry Young | Longman | QLD | 22 July 2025 – current |

=== Government leadership ===
| Office | Officer | Electorate | State | Term of office |
|---|---|---|---|---|
| Leader of the House | Tony Burke | Watson | NSW | 1 June 2022 – current |
| Chief Whip | Joanne Ryan | Lalor | VIC | 31 May 2022 – current |
| Whip | Anne Stanley | Werriwa | NSW | 2 July 2019 – current |
| Whip | David Smith | Bean | ACT | 31 May 2022 – current |

=== Opposition leadership ===
| Office | Officer | Electorate | State | Term in office |
|---|---|---|---|---|
| Manager of Opposition Business | Alex Hawke | Mitchell | NSW | 28 May 2025 – 17 February 2026 |
| Manager of Opposition Business | Dan Tehan | Wannon | Vic | 17 February 2026 – current |
| Chief Opposition Whip | Aaron Violi | Casey | Vic | 28 May 2025 – 23 February 2026 |
| Chief Opposition Whip | Cameron Caldwell | Fadden | Qld | 23 February 2026 – current |
| Whip | Cameron Caldwell | Fadden | Qld | 28 May 2025 – 23 February 2026 |
| Whip | Henry Pike | Bowman | Qld | 28 May 2025 – 23 February 2026 |
| Whip | Mary Aldred | Monash | Vic | 23 February 2026 – current |
| Whip | Ben Small | Forrest | WA | 23 February 2026 – current |
| Chief Nationals Whip | Michelle Landry | Capricornia | Qld | 30 May 2025 – current |
| Deputy Nationals Whip | David Batt | Hinkler | Qld | 30 May 2025 – current |

== Members ==
| Member | | Party | Electorate | State | Years in office | Ref |
|---|---|---|---|---|---|---|
| | Basem Abdo (born 1987) | Labor | Calwell | VIC | 2025–current | |
| Anthony Albanese | Anthony Albanese (born 1963) | Labor | Grayndler | NSW | 1996–current | |
| | Mary Aldred (born 1983) | Liberal | Monash | VIC | 2025–current | |
| | Anne Aly (born 1967) | Labor | Cowan | WA | 2016–current | |
| | Ash Ambihaipahar (born 1987) | Labor | Barton | NSW | 2025–current | |
| | David Batt (born 1971) | National (Note: Member of the LNP who sits with the National Party.) | Hinkler | QLD | 2025–current | |
| | Angie Bell (born 1968) | Liberal (Note: Member of the LNP who sits with the Liberal Party.) | Moncrieff | QLD | 2019–current | |
| Jodie Belyea | Jodie Belyea (born 1967) | Labor | Dunkley | VIC | 2024–current | |
| | Carol Berry (born 1975) | Labor | Whitlam | NSW | 2025–current | |
| | Sam Birrell (born 1975) | National | Nicholls | VIC | 2022–current | |
| | Nicolette Boele (born 1970) | Independent | Bradfield | NSW | 2025–current | |
| Chris Bowen | Chris Bowen (born 1973) | Labor | McMahon | NSW | 2004–current | |
| Colin Boyce | Colin Boyce (born 1962) | National | Flynn | QLD | 2022–current | |
| | Jo Briskey (born 1985) | Labor | Maribyrnong | VIC | 2025–current | |
| Scott Buchholz | Scott Buchholz (born 1968) | Liberal | Wright | QLD | 2010–current | |
| Tony Burke | Tony Burke (born 1969) | Labor | Watson | NSW | 2004–current | |
| Matt Burnell | Matt Burnell (born 1978) | Labor | Spence | SA | 2022–current | |
| Josh Burns | Josh Burns (born 1987) | Labor | Macnamara | VIC | 2019–current | |
| Mark Butler | Mark Butler (born 1970) | Labor | Hindmarsh | SA | 2007–current | |
| Alison Byrnes | Alison Byrnes (born 1974) | Labor | Cunningham | NSW | 2022–current | |
| | Cameron Caldwell (born 1979) | Liberal | Fadden | QLD | 2023–current | |
| | Julie-Ann Campbell (born 1986) | Labor | Moreton | QLD | 2025–current | |
| | Jamie Chaffey (born ?) | National | Parkes | NSW | 2025–current | |
| Jim Chalmers | Jim Chalmers (born 1978) | Labor | Rankin | QLD | 2013–current | |
| Kate Chaney | Kate Chaney (born 1975) | Independent | Curtin | WA | 2022–current | |
| Andrew Charlton | Andrew Charlton (born 1978) | Labor | Parramatta | NSW | 2022–current | |
| Darren Chester | Darren Chester (born 1967) | National | Gippsland | VIC | 2008–current | |
| Lisa Chesters | Lisa Chesters (born 1980) | Labor | Bendigo | VIC | 2013–current | |
| Jason Clare | Jason Clare (born 1972) | Labor | Blaxland | NSW | 2007–current | |
| | Sharon Claydon (born 1964) | Labor | Newcastle | NSW | 2013–current | |
| | Claire Clutterham (born 1982) | Labor | Sturt | SA | 2025–current | |
| | Renee Coffey (born 1982) | Labor | Griffith | QLD | 2025–current | |
| Libby Coker | Libby Coker (born 1962) | Labor | Corangamite | VIC | 2019–current | |
| Julie Collins | Julie Collins (born 1971) | Labor | Franklin | TAS | 2007–current | |
| | Emma Comer (born 1994) | Labor | Petrie | QLD | 2025–current | |
| | Pat Conaghan (born 1971) | National | Cowper | NSW | 2019–current | |
| Pat Conroy | Pat Conroy (born 1979) | Labor | Shortland | NSW | 2013–current | |
| | Kara Cook (born 1985) | Labor | Bonner | QLD | 2025–current | |
| | Trish Cook (born 1964) | Labor | Bullwinkel | WA | 2025–current | |
| Milton Dick | Milton Dick (born 1972) | Labor | Oxley | QLD | 2016–current | |
| | Mary Doyle (born 1970) | Labor | Aston | VIC | 2023–current | |
| Mark Dreyfus | Mark Dreyfus (born 1956) | Labor | Isaacs | VIC | 2007–current | |
| Justine Elliot | Justine Elliot (born 1967) | Labor | Richmond | NSW | 2004–current | |
| Davide Farley | David Farley (born 1957) | One Nation | Farrer | NSW | 2026–present | |
| Cassandra Fernando | Cassandra Fernando (born 1987) | Labor | Holt | VIC | 2022–current | |
| | Ali France (born 1973) | Labor | Dickson | QLD | 2025–current | |
| | Mike Freelander (born 1953) | Labor | Macarthur | NSW | 2016–current | |
| | Tom French (born 1983) | Labor | Moore | WA | 2025–current | |
| Carina Garland | Carina Garland (born 1982) | Labor | Chisholm | VIC | 2022–current | |
| Andrew Gee | Andrew Gee (born 1968) | Independent | Calare | NSW | 2016–current | |
| Steve Georganas | Steve Georganas (born 1959) | Labor | Adelaide | SA | 2004–2013; 2016–current | |
| Andrew Giles | Andrew Giles (born 1973) | Labor | Scullin | VIC | 2013–current | |
| | Patrick Gorman (born 1984) | Labor | Perth | WA | 2018–current | |
| | Luke Gosling (born 1971) | Labor | Solomon | NT | 2016–current | |
| | Matt Gregg (born ?) | Labor | Deakin | VIC | 2025–current | |
| | Helen Haines (born 1961) | Independent | Indi | VIC | 2019–current | |
| | Garth Hamilton (born 1979) | Liberal | Groom | QLD | 2020–current | |
| | Andrew Hastie (born 1982) | Liberal | Canning | WA | 2015–current | |
| Alex Hawke | Alex Hawke (born 1977) | Liberal | Mitchell | NSW | 2007–current | |
| Julian Hill | Julian Hill (born 1973) | Labor | Bruce | VIC | 2016–current | |
| Kevin Hogan | Kevin Hogan (born 1963) | National | Page | NSW | 2013–current | |
| | Rowan Holzberger (born 1973) | Labor | Forde | QLD | 2025–current | |
| | Ed Husic (born 1970) | Labor | Chifley | NSW | 2010–current | |
| | Madonna Jarrett (born 1966) | Labor | Brisbane | QLD | 2025–current | |
| | Alice Jordan-Baird (born 1993) | Labor | Gorton | VIC | 2025–current | |
| Barnaby Joyce | Barnaby Joyce (born 1967) | One Nation | New England | NSW | 2013–2017; 2017–current | |
| Bob Katter | Bob Katter (born 1945) | Katter's Australian | Kennedy | QLD | 1993–current | |
| Ged Kearney | Ged Kearney (born 1963) | Labor | Cooper | VIC | 2018–current | |
| | Simon Kennedy (born 1982) | Liberal | Cook | NSW | 2024–current | |
| Matt Keogh | Matt Keogh (born 1981) | Labor | Burt | WA | 2016–current | |
| | Peter Khalil (born 1973) | Labor | Wills | VIC | 2016–current | |
| Catherine King | Catherine King (born 1966) | Labor | Ballarat | VIC | 2001–current | |
| Madeleine King | Madeleine King (born 1973) | Labor | Brand | WA | 2016–current | |
| Michelle Landry | Michelle Landry (born 1962) | National | Capricornia | QLD | 2013–current | |
| | Tania Lawrence (born 1973) | Labor | Hasluck | WA | 2022–current | |
| Jerome Laxale | Jerome Laxale (born 1983) | Labor | Bennelong | NSW | 2022–current | |
| Dai Le | Dai Le (born 1968) | Independent | Fowler | NSW | 2022–current | |
| | Julian Leeser (born 1976) | Liberal | Berowra | NSW | 2016–current | |
| Andrew Leigh | Andrew Leigh (born 1972) | Labor | Fenner | ACT | 2010–current | |
| | Sussan Ley (born 1961) | Liberal | Farrer | NSW | 2001–2026 | |
| | Sam Lim (born 1961) | Labor | Tangney | WA | 2022–current | |
| David Littleproud | David Littleproud (born 1976) | National | Maranoa | QLD | 2016–current | |
| Richard Marles | Richard Marles (born 1967) | Labor | Corio | VIC | 2007–current | |
| | Zaneta Mascarenhas (born 1980) | Labor | Swan | WA | 2022–current | |
| Kristy McBain | Kristy McBain (born 1982) | Labor | Eden-Monaro | NSW | 2020–current | |
| Emma McBride | Emma McBride (born 1975) | Labor | Dobell | NSW | 2016–current | |
| Michael McCormack | Michael McCormack (born 1964) | National | Riverina | NSW | 2010–current | |
| Melissa McIntosh | Melissa McIntosh (born 1977) | Liberal | Lindsay | NSW | 2019–current | |
| | Zoe McKenzie (born 1972) | Liberal | Flinders | VIC | 2022-current | |
| Louise Miller-Frost | Louise Miller-Frost (born 1967) | Labor | Boothby | SA | 2022–current | |
| Rob Mitchell | Rob Mitchell (born 1967) | Labor | McEwen | VIC | 2010–current | |
| | David Moncrieff (born ?) | Labor | Hughes | NSW | 2025–current | |
| Daniel Mulino | Daniel Mulino (born 1969) | Labor | Fraser | VIC | 2019–current | |
| Shayne Neumann | Shayne Neumann (born 1961) | Labor | Blair | QLD | 2007–current | |
| | Gabriel Ng (born 1982) | Labor | Menzies | VIC | 2025–current | |
| | Llew O'Brien (born 1972) | National | Wide Bay | QLD | 2016–current | |
| | Ted O'Brien (born 1974) | Liberal | Fairfax | QLD | 2016–current | |
| Clare O'Neil | Clare O'Neil (born 1980) | Labor | Hotham | VIC | 2013–current | |
| | Tony Pasin (born 1977) | Liberal | Barker | SA | 2013–current | |
| | Alicia Payne (born 1982) | Labor | Canberra | ACT | 2019–current | |
| | Alison Penfold (born 1971) | National | Lyne | NSW | 2025–current | |
| Fiona Philips | Fiona Phillips (born 1970) | Labor | Gilmore | NSW | 2019–current | |
| | Henry Pike (born 1987) | Liberal | Bowman | QLD | 2022–current | |
| Tanya Plibersek | Tanya Plibersek (born 1969) | Labor | Sydney | NSW | 1998–current | |
| | Melissa Price (born 1963) | Liberal | Durack | WA | 2013–current | |
| | Sam Rae (born 1986) | Labor | Hawke | VIC | 2022–current | |
| | Leon Rebello (born 1995) | Liberal | McPherson | QLD | 2025–current | |
| | Gordon Reid (born 1992) | Labor | Robertson | NSW | 2022–current | |
| Dan Repacholi | Dan Repacholi (born 1982) | Labor | Hunter | NSW | 2022–current | |
| Amanda Rishworth | Amanda Rishworth (born 1978) | Labor | Kingston | SA | 2007–current | |
| | Tracey Roberts (born 1961) | Labor | Pearce | WA | 2022–current | |
| Michelle Rowland | Michelle Rowland (born 1971) | Labor | Greenway | NSW | 2010–current | |
| Joanne Ryan | Joanne Ryan (born 1961) | Labor | Lalor | VIC | 2013–current | |
| Monique Ryan | Monique Ryan (born 1967) | Independent | Kooyong | VIC | 2022–current | |
| Sophie Scamps | Sophie Scamps (born 1971) | Independent | Mackellar | NSW | 2022–current | |
| Marion Scrymgour | Marion Scrymgour (born 1960) | Labor | Lingiari | NT (Note: The Division of Lingiari within the Northern Territory also includes the respective external territories of Cocos (Keeling) Islands and Christmas Island.) | 2022–current | |
| Rebekha Sharkie | Rebekha Sharkie (born 1972) | Centre Alliance | Mayo | SA | 2016–2018; 2018–current | |
| Sally Sitou | Sally Sitou (born 1982) | Labor | Reid | NSW | 2022–current | |
| | Ben Small (born 1988) | Liberal | Forrest | WA | 2025–current | |
| David Smith | David Smith (born 1970) | Labor | Bean | ACT (Note: The Division of Bean within the Australian Capital Territory also includes the external territory of Norfolk Island.) | 2019–current | |
| | Matt Smith (born 1979) | Labor | Leichhardt | QLD | 2025–current | |
| | Zhi Soon (born 1985) | Labor | Banks | NSW | 2025–current | |
| Allegra Spender | Allegra Spender (born 1978) | Community Strong | Wentworth | NSW | 2022–current | |
| Anne Stanley | Anne Stanley (born 1961) | Labor | Werriwa | NSW | 2016–current | |
| Zali Steggall | Zali Steggall (born 1974) | Community Strong | Warringah | NSW | 2019–current | |
| Meryl Swanson | Meryl Swanson (born 1970) | Labor | Paterson | NSW | 2016–current | |
| Angus Taylor | Angus Taylor (born 1966) | Liberal | Hume | NSW | 2013–current | |
| | Jess Teesdale (born 1983) | Labor | Bass | TAS | 2025–current | |
| Dan Tehan | Dan Tehan (born 1968) | Liberal | Wannon | VIC | 2010–current | |
| | Susan Templeman (born 1963) | Labor | Macquarie | NSW | 2016–current | |
| Matt Thistlethwaite | Matt Thistlethwaite (born 1972) | Labor | Kingsford Smith | NSW | 2013–current | |
| Phillip Thompson | Phillip Thompson (born 1988) | Liberal | Herbert | QLD | 2019–current | |
| | Kate Thwaites (born 1980) | Labor | Jagajaga | VIC | 2019–current | |
| | Anne Urquhart (born 1957) | Labor | Braddon | TAS | 2025–current | |
| | Tom Venning (born 1994) | Liberal | Grey | SA | 2025–current | |
| | Aaron Violi (born 1984) | Liberal | Casey | VIC | 2022–current | |
| Andrew Wallace | Andrew Wallace (born 1968) | Liberal | Fisher | QLD | 2016–current | |
| Elizabeth Watson-Brown | Elizabeth Watson-Brown (born 1956) | Greens | Ryan | QLD | 2022–current | |
| Tim Watts | Tim Watts (born 1982) | Labor | Gellibrand | VIC | 2013–current | |
| | Anne Webster (born 1959) | National | Mallee | VIC | 2019–current | |
| Anika Wells | Anika Wells (born 1985) | Labor | Lilley | QLD | 2019–current | |
| | Rebecca White (born 1983) | Labor | Lyons | TAS | 2025–current | |
| | Andrew Willcox (born 1969) | National | Dawson | QLD | 2022–current | |
| Andrew Wilkie | Andrew Wilkie (born 1961) | Independent | Clark | TAS | 2010–current | |
| Josh Wilson | Josh Wilson (born 1972) | Labor | Fremantle | WA | 2016–2018; 2018–current | |
| Rick Wilson | Rick Wilson (born 1966) | Liberal | O'Connor | WA | 2013–current | |
| | Tim Wilson (born 1980) | Liberal | Goldstein | VIC | 2016–2022; 2025–current | |
| | Sarah Witty (born 1972) | Labor | Melbourne | VIC | 2025–current | |
| Jason Wood | Jason Wood (born 1968) | Liberal | La Trobe | VIC | 2004–2010; 2013–current | |
| Terry Young | Terry Young (born 1968) | Liberal | Longman | QLD | 2019–current | |
| Tony Zappia | Tony Zappia (born 1952) | Labor | Makin | SA | 2007–current | |

== Current party standings ==
As of 25 June 2026.

| 94 | 1 | 1 | 1 | 8 | 2 | 2 | 8 | 16 | 17 |
| ALP | GRN | CA | KAP | IND | CSA | ONP | NAT | LNP | LIB |

=== Breakdown by state and territory ===
| State/Territory | Labor | | Coalition | | Greens | | Independent | | One Nation | | Centre Alliance | | Katter's Australian Party | | Total |
|---|---|---|---|---|---|---|---|---|---|---|---|---|---|---|---|
| New South Wales | 28 | 60.87% | 10 | 21.74% | 0 | – | 6 | 13.04% | 2 | 4.35% | 0 | – | 0 | – | 46 |
| Victoria | 27 | 71.1% | 9 | 23.7% | 0 | – | 2 | 5.3% | 0 | – | 0 | – | 0 | – | 38 |
| Queensland | 12 | 40.0% | 16 | 53.3% | 1 | 3.3% | 0 | – | 0 | – | 0 | – | 1 | 3.3% | 30 |
| Western Australia | 11 | 68.8% | 4 | 25.0% | 0 | – | 1 | 6.3% | 0 | – | 0 | – | 0 | – | 16 |
| South Australia | 7 | 70.0% | 2 | 20.0% | 0 | – | 0 | – | 0 | – | 1 | 10.0% | 0 | – | 10 |
| Tasmania | 4 | 80.0% | 0 | – | 0 | – | 1 | 20.0% | 0 | – | 0 | – | 0 | – | 5 |
| Australian Capital Territory | 3 | 100.0% | 0 | – | 0 | – | 0 | – | 0 | – | 0 | – | 0 | – | 3 |
| Northern Territory | 2 | 100.0% | 0 | – | 0 | – | 0 | – | 0 | – | 0 | – | 0 | – | 2 |
| House of Representatives | 94 | 62.7% | 41 | 27.3% | 1 | 0.7% | 10 | 6.7% | 2 | 1.4% | 1 | 0.7% | 1 | 0.7% | 150 |

== Changes of composition ==
=== Party composition ===
Over the course of the 48th Parliament, changes in membership resulted in changes to party composition, which are summarised below.

House of Representatives composition as of 9 May 2026

Overview of House membership by party
| | Party (shading shows majority) | | | | Total | Vacant |
| | Labor | Liberal | National | Crossbench | Total | Vacant |
|---|---|---|---|---|---|---|
| End of previous Parliament | 77 | 39 | 14 | 19 (Note: Included 13 Independents, 4 Greens, 1 Centre Alliance, and 1 KAP.) | 149 | 2 |
| Begin (8 December 2025) | 94 | 28 (Note: Including 10 Liberal National Party of Queensland (LNP) MPs who sit in the Liberals party room) | 14 (Note: Including 6 Liberal National Party of Queensland (LNP) MPs who sit in the Nationals party room) | 14 (Note: The Crossbench includes 1 Greens, 1 Katter's Australian, 1 Centre Alliance, 1 One Nation, and 10 Independents: Nicolette Boele, Kate Chaney, Andrew Gee, Helen Haines, Dai Le, Monique Ryan, Sophie Scamps, Allegra Spender, Zali Steggall and Andrew Wilkie.) | 150 | 0 |
| 13 February 2026 | 94 | 27 | 14 | 14 | 149 | 1 |
| 9 May 2026 | 94 | 27 | 14 | 15 (Note: Following the 2026 Farrer by-election) | 150 | 0 |
| Current voting share | 62.7% | 27.3% | | 10% | 100% | 0% |

=== Membership changes ===
This table lists members of the House who have resigned, died, been elected or appointed, or otherwise changed their party affiliation during the 48th Parliament.

| Seat | Before | | Change | | After | | |
| Seat | Member | Party | Type | Date | Date | Member | Party |
|---|---|---|---|---|---|---|---|
| New England | Barnaby Joyce | National | Resignation from party | 27 November 2025 | | Barnaby Joyce | Independent |
| New England | Barnaby Joyce | Independent | Joined new party | 8 December 2025 | | Barnaby Joyce | One Nation |
| Farrer | Sussan Ley | Liberal | Resignation | 27 February 2026 | 9 May 2026 | David Farley | One Nation |
| Wentworth | Allegra Spender | Independent | Founded new party | 25 June 2026 | | Allegra Spender | Community Strong |
| Warringah | Zali Steggall | Independent | Founded new party | 25 June 2026 | | Zali Steggall | Community Strong |
