= 1940 Corio by-election =

2 March 1940
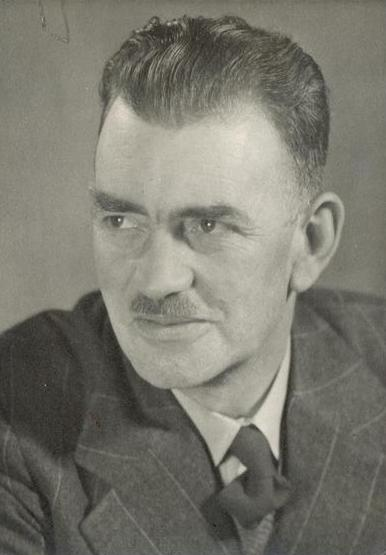
	First party	Second party
		UAP
Candidate	John Dedman	James Vinton Smith
Party	Labor	United Australia
Popular vote	26,122	22,878
Percentage	51.8%	45.3%
Swing	▲8.3pp	▼11.2pp
TPP	54.4%	45.6%
TPP swing	▲10.9pp	▼10.9pp
MP before election
Richard Casey
United Australia
Elected MP
John Dedman
Labor

A by-election was held for the Australian House of Representatives seat of Corio on 2 March 1940. This was triggered by the resignation of United Australia Party MP Richard Casey to become Australian Ambassador to the United States.

The by-election was won by Labor candidate John Dedman.

== Results ==
Corio by-election, 1940
Party	Candidate	Votes	%	±%
Labor	John Dedman	26,122	51.8	+8.3
United Australia	James Vinton Smith	22,878	45.3	−11.2
Communist	Gerry O'Day	1,466	2.9	+2.9
Total formal votes		50,466	98.5	
Informal votes		786	1.5	
Turnout		51,252	93.3	
Two-party-preferred result
Labor	John Dedman		54.4	+10.9
United Australia	James Vinton Smith		45.6	−10.9
Labor gain from United Australia		Swing	+10.9	
