= Alan Scanlan =

Australian politician (1931–2025)

Alan Henry Scanlan (23 June 1931 – 22 December 2025) was an Australian politician.

He was born in Caulfield to commercial traveller Edward Daniel John Scanlan and Winifred Bernice Fowler. He attended Melbourne High School and Melbourne Teachers' College, and worked as a teacher in London from 1958 to 1959. On 16 December 1961, he married fellow teacher Shirley Jane Pope, with whom he had one son. He had joined the Liberal Party in 1952 and was president of the Victorian Young Liberals from 1959 to 1961.

In 1961, he was elected to the Victorian Legislative Assembly as the member for Oakleigh. He was Cabinet Secretary from 1970 to 1972, Assistant Minister for Education from 1972 to 1973, Minister for Health from 1973 to 1976 and Minister of Special Education from 1976 to 1979, when he was defeated. He subsequently moved to Trinity Beach in Queensland, where he served on Mulgrave Shire Council from 1982.

Scanlan died on 22 December 2025, at the age of 94.

Victorian Legislative Assembly
| Preceded by Val Doube | Member for Oakleigh; 1961–1979 | Succeeded by Race Mathews |
