= James Vinton Smith =

Australian politician

James Vinton Smith MC

Member of the Victorian Legislative Assembly for Oakleigh
- In office 14 May 1932 – 6 September 1937
- Preceded by: Squire Reid
- Succeeded by: Squire Reid

Personal details
- Born: James Taylor Vinton Smith; 3 November 1897 Parkside, South Australia
- Died: 22 July 1952 (aged 54) Malvern East, Victoria, Australia
- Party: United Australia Party
- Spouse: Constance Lillian Randall (m. 1925)
- Occupation: Stock broker

Military service
- Allegiance: Australia
- Branch/service: Australian Imperial Force
- Years of service: 1916–1919
- Rank: Lieutenant
- Unit: 13th Brigade
- Awards: Military Cross

James Taylor Vinton Smith, MC (3 November 1897 – 22 July 1952) was an Australian politician. He was the Member of the Victorian Legislative Assembly for Oakleigh from 1932 to 1937, for the United Australia Party.

== Early life ==
He was born in 1897 in Parkside, a suburb of Adelaide, to Thomas Ladyman Home Smith and Minerva Mary Daniel. He was educated at Adelaide High School, and on 25 April 1915, joined the Bank of New South Wales in Adelaide as a bank clerk.

== Military service ==
Vinton Smith enlisted in the Australian Imperial Force at Adelaide on 1 February 1916, and was assigned to the 113th Howitzer Battery of the 13th Brigade, with which he saw active service in France. He attained the rank of Lieutenant on 1 March 1917.

On 2 April 1919, he was awarded the Military Cross for gallantry during a battle on the Selle River in October 1918, for which he was also Mentioned in Despatches. The citation read:

Lt. James Taylor Vinton Smith, 113th (Howr.) By., 13th Bde., Aust. F.A. For conspicuous gallantry and devotion to duty on 17th October, 1918, at the capture of the high ground E. of La Selle river. His battery occupied a position 1,000 yards in rear of the front line, and suffered many casualties from machine-gun and artillery fire. The battery commander and another officer being both wounded, he took charge, and supervising the removal of the wounded, handled the battery most capably until its task was completed.

== Political career ==
Vinton Smith nominated as a candidate for the seat of Oakleigh in the Victorian Legislative Assembly at the 1932 Victorian state election. Although aligned with the United Australia Party, he was not the endorsed UAP candidate, and ran as an independent against the official UAP candidate and the Labor candidate, incumbent member Squire Reid. When the UAP candidate was eliminated, his second preferences gave him a majority over Reid, winning him the seat. Despite having defeated the endorsed candidate, Vinton Smith was immediately admitted to the UAP parliamentary party upon his election. Vinton Smith—this time fully endorsed by the UAP—narrowly defeated Reid again in the 1935 election, but Reid regained the seat in 1937.

Vinton Smith contested the federal by-election for Corio in 1940, but lost to the Labor candidate John Dedman.

== Business career ==
After leaving politics, Vinton Smith returned to the financial sector. He founded a stock trading firm, which upon his death was left to two of his business partners, W.R. Dougall and F.J. Dean. The firm became known as Vinton Smith, Dean & Dougall, and later Vinton Smith Dougall, Ltd.

He was also chairman of Edments Holdings Ltd., and company director for F. J. Walker Ltd., Sydney; M. B. John Ltd., valve manufacturers, Ballarat; Silk and Textile Printers Ltd., Hobart; Modern Permanent Building Society Ltd., Carpet Manufacturers Ltd., Sydney; and several other companies.

== Suicide ==
On 22 July 1952, Vinton Smith told his wife he was going to the shed at their Malvern East home to chop wood. She decided to check on him when she heard the chopping stop, and found him dead from a gunshot wound, with a 22-calibre rifle underneath his body. The city coroner ruled a verdict of suicide, noting that Vinton Smith had been suffering from a serious heart complaint and was "a candidate for a very early death" who appeared to have "shot himself on a sudden impulse".

When his will was lodged for probate, it was discovered that Vinton Smith had left a large estate worth £204,593 (equivalent to $8,500,000 in 2022).

Victorian Legislative Assembly
Preceded by Squire Reid	Member for Oakleigh; 1932–1937	Succeeded by Squire Reid
