= John Lechte =

Australian politician

John Scrimgeour Lechte (17 January 1921 – 1 July 2002) was an Australian politician.

He was born in Hawthorn to market gardener John Lavidge Lechte and Caroline Reid Scrimgeour. He attended state schools and followed his father to become a market gardener. During World War II he served with the 1st Australian Armoured Division and with the 9th Division in Borneo before his attachment to US intelligence in Manila. On 20 May 1944 he married Muriel Kathryn Love, with whom he had three sons. In 1947 he was elected to the Victorian Legislative Assembly as the Liberal member for Oakleigh, but he was expelled from the party in February 1950 after criticising Thomas Hollway's government. Defeated as an independent in 1950, he joined the Australian Labor Party in 1956, but was expelled in 1970. During the 1970s he was the editor of the Southern Peninsula Gazette. Lechte died in Castlemaine in 2002.

Victorian Legislative Assembly
Preceded by Squire Reid	Member for Oakleigh; 1947–1950	Succeeded by Val Doube
