= Division of Casey =

Australian federal electoral division

Coordinates: 37.773°S 145.400°E

Casey Australian House of Representatives Division
- Interactive map of electorate boundaries from the 2025 federal election
- Created: 1969
- MP: Aaron Violi
- Party: Liberal
- Namesake: Richard Casey
- Electors: 122,417 (2025)
- Area: 2,624 km^{2} (1,013.1 sq mi)
- Demographic: Rural

The Division of Casey is an Australian electoral division in the state of Victoria. The division was created in 1969 and is named for Richard Casey, who was Governor-General of Australia 1965–69.

The division is located in the outer eastern suburbs of Melbourne and extends into the Yarra Valley and Dandenong Ranges. As of 2025, it covers the entire Shire of Yarra Ranges, with very small portions of Shire of Cardinia, City of Manningham and Shire of Nillumbik.

The current Member for Casey, since the 2022 federal election, is Aaron Violi, a member of the Liberal Party of Australia. His immediate predecessor is Tony Smith, who was Speaker of the House from 2015 through 2021, and was, after Bob Halverson, the second member for this electorate to occupy the chair.

== Geography ==
Since 1984, federal electoral division boundaries in Australia have been determined at redistributions by a redistribution committee appointed by the Australian Electoral Commission. Redistributions occur for the boundaries of divisions in a particular state, and they occur every seven years, or sooner if a state's representation entitlement changes or when divisions of a state are malapportioned.

When it was created in 1968, the division spanned from Wantirna and Bayswater in the eastern suburbs of Melbourne to the south, to Kinglake in the Yarra Valley to the north. It also included the suburbs of Mitcham, Heathmont, Ringwood and Chirnside Park, and the towns of Warrandyte, Kangaroo Ground and Yarra Glen, but stoppping short of Healesville. The areas in eastern Melbourne were previously part of the Division of La Trobe and the areas in the Yarra Valley were previous part of the Division of Deakin.

In 1977, the division was doubled in area size by expanding eastwards and including more of the Yarra Valley, but losing Mitcham, Heathmont and Wantirna to the Division of Deakin. The expanded areas in the Yarra Valley were previously in the Division of La Trobe and the expanded areas included Lilydale, Healesville and Marysville. This expansion was largely reversed in 1984, except Lilydale which remained with Casey, and the lost areas became part of the new Division of Streeton. In 1989, when Streeton was abolished, the division of Casey was expanded eastwards again and regained Healesville, but also gaining Warburton and Yarra Junction. It also included all of Shire of Upper Yarra, extending into national parks and stopping short of Mount Baw Baw and Thomson Dam in Gippsland. In 1994, this expansion was reversed again. However, the division also shifted south, losing almost all areas in the Yarra Valley, but gaining areas to the south such as Kilsyth South and the Dandenong Ranges including Mount Dandenong and Monbulk. The division then remained like this until 2010 with only very minor boundary changes in 2003.

In 2010, the division expanded into the Yarra Valley again and regaining Yarra Glen, Healesville, Yarra Junction and Warburton, but lost Croydon in eastern Melbourne to the Division of Deakin. In 2018, it expanded further south to include the remaining areas of Shire of Yarra Ranges previously in the Division of La Trobe, such as Belgrave and Narre Warren East. The division also became co-extensive with the Shire of Yarra Ranges. In 2021, it included the Shire of Cardinia towns of Clematis and Avonsleigh to the south, which was also previously in the Division of La Trobe. In 2024, it was slightly expanded to its north-west into the City of Manningham and Shire of Nillumbik to include Wonga Park and Christmas Hills. These were previously part of the Division of Menzies and Division of McEwen respectively.

As of the 2024 redistribution, it covers an area of approximately 2,624 square kilometres (1,013 sq mi). It covers all of the Shire of Yarra Ranges, with very small portions of Shire of Cardinia (Clematis and Avonsleigh), City of Manningham (Wonga Park) and Shire of Nillumbik (Christmas Hills). Major suburbs and towns include Avonsleigh, Belgrave, Belgrave Heights, Belgrave South, Chirnside Park, Christmas Hills, Clematis, Coldstream, Dixons Creek, Don Valley, Ferny Creek, Gladysdale, Gruyere, Healesville, Hoddles Creek, Kallista, Kalorama, Kilsyth, Kilsyth South, Launching Place, Lilydale, Lysterfield, Menzies Creek, Millgrove, Monbulk, Montrose, Mooroolbark, Mount Evelyn, Mount Dandenong, Olinda, Powelltown, Reefton, Sassafras, Selby, Seville, Seville East, Silvan, Tecoma, Upwey, Wandin North, Wandin East, Warburton, Wesburn, Woori Yallock, Wonga Park, Yarra Glen and Yellingbo.

== History ==
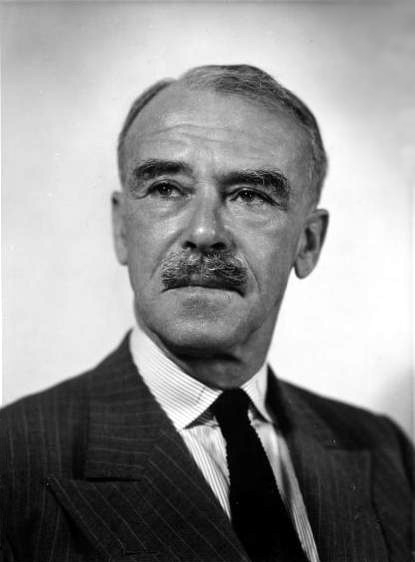
Richard Casey, the division's namesake

When it was created it was a highly marginal seat, and at the 1972 federal election it was regarded as the "litmus seat", which the Australian Labor Party had to win to gain government. Lost when the Liberals won in 1975, Labor picked it up again when Labor regained government in 1983. However, a redistribution ahead of the following year's election made Casey marginally Liberal. The Liberals retook the seat in that election and have held it since then. Demographic changes have also contributed in making Casey a fairly safe seat for the Liberal Party, although a redistribution ahead of the 2013 federal election pushed the seat further north into the upper Yarra Valley, estimated to halve the Liberal two-party preferred majority of 4.2 per cent.

Prominent members to have represented Casey include Peter Howson, who served as a minister in the McMahon government; Bob Halverson, who was Speaker of the House of Representatives 1996–98; Michael Wooldridge, who served as Minister for Health in the first five years of the Howard government (1996–2001); and Tony Smith, Speaker from 2015 until 2021.

== Members ==
Image	Member	Party	Term	Notes
	Peter Howson (1919–2009)	Liberal	25 October 1969 – 2 December 1972	Previously held the Division of Fawkner. Served as minister under McMahon. Lost seat
	Race Mathews (1935–2025)	Labor	2 December 1972 – 13 December 1975	Lost seat. Later elected to the Victorian Legislative Assembly seat of Oakleigh in 1979
	Peter Falconer (1943–)	Liberal	13 December 1975 – 5 March 1983	Lost seat
	Peter Steedman (1943–2024)	Labor	5 March 1983 – 1 December 1984	Lost seat
	Bob Halverson (1937–2016)	Liberal	1 December 1984 – 31 August 1998	Served as Speaker during the Howard Government. Retired
	Michael Wooldridge (1956–)	Liberal	3 October 1998 – 8 October 2001	Previously held the Division of Chisholm. Served as minister under Howard. Retired
	Tony Smith (1967–)	Liberal	10 November 2001 – 11 April 2022	Served as Speaker during the Abbott, Turnbull and Morrison Governments. Retired
	Aaron Violi (1984–)	Liberal	21 May 2022 – present	Incumbent

== Election results ==
2025 Australian federal election: Casey
Party	Candidate	Votes	%	±%
Liberal	Aaron Violi	45,194	40.88	+4.30
Labor	Naomi Oakley	26,820	24.26	−0.79
Greens	Merran Blair	12,107	10.95	−2.18
Independent	Claire Ferres Miles	11,590	10.48	+2.43
One Nation	Ambere Livori	5,603	5.07	+1.80
Trumpet of Patriots	Phillip Courtis	3,716	3.36	+2.65
Family First	Dan Nebauer	3,154	2.85	+2.85
Animal Justice	Chloe Bond	2,379	2.15	+0.36
Total formal votes		110,563	95.60	+1.75
Informal votes		5,089	4.40	−1.75
Turnout		115,652	94.52	+2.44
Two-party-preferred result
Liberal	Aaron Violi	58,479	52.89	+1.46
Labor	Naomi Oakley	52,084	47.11	−1.46
Liberal hold		Swing	+1.46	
