= Val Doube =

Australian politician

Victorian Minister of Health
- In office 31 March 1955 – 8 June 1955
- Premier: John Cain
- Preceded by: Bill Barry
- Succeeded by: Ewen Cameron

Personal details
- Born: Valentine Joseph Doube; 3 January 1915 Brighton, Victoria, Australia
- Died: 18 January 1988 (aged 73)
- Party: Labor Party
- Spouse: Freda May Scott (m. 1941)
- Education: University of Melbourne
- Occupation: Schoolteacher and public servant

Military service
- Allegiance: Australia
- Branch/service: Australian Imperial Force (1941–1943); Royal Australian Air Force (1943–1945)
- Years of service: 1941–1945
- Rank: Lance Corporal (AIF); Flying Officer (RAAF)

Valentine Joseph Doube (3 January 1915 – 18 January 1988) was an Australian politician.

Born in Brighton to hat maker Francis William Robert Doube and Honora Fitzgerald, Doube was educated at St James' School in Gardenvale before studying at Melbourne University, receiving a Diploma of Physical Education in 1940. He taught physical education in primary schools from 1933 until 1941, when he enlisted in the Australian Imperial Force. On 17 May 1941 he married Freda May Scott, with whom he had three sons. In 1943 he transferred to the Royal Australian Air Force, where he remained until the end of the war.

In 1945, the year he joined the Labor Party, Doube began work at the Department of Immigration. In 1946, he unsuccessfully contested the federal seat of Henty in a by-election. In 1950 he was elected to the Victorian Legislative Assembly as the member for Oakleigh. He was appointed Minister for Health in March 1955 but lost the position following Labor's crushing defeat at that year's elections.

Doube held his seat until 1961, when he was defeated, but returned to the Assembly in 1970 as the member for Albert Park. He retired from politics in 1979, becoming an executive member of Amnesty International and a member of the Victorian State Relief Committee.

Victorian Legislative Assembly
Preceded by John Lechte	Member for Oakleigh; 1950–1961	Succeeded by Alan Scanlan
Preceded by Keith Sutton	Member for Albert Park; 1970–1979	Succeeded by Bunna Walsh
Political offices
Preceded by Bill Barry	Minister of Health; 1955	Succeeded by Ewen Cameron
