= Peter Falconer (politician) =

Australian politician

- Peter Falconer MP

Member of the Australian Parliament for Casey
- In office 13 December 1975 – 5 March 1983
- Preceded by: Race Mathews
- Succeeded by: Peter Steedman

Personal details
- Born: 23 September 1943 (age 83) Fern Tree Gully, Victoria, Australia
- Party: Liberal
- Education: Monash University
- Occupation: Management consultant

Peter David Falconer (born 23 September 1943) is a former Australian politician. He was a member of the House of Representatives from 1975 to 1983, representing the seat of Casey for the Liberal Party.

== Early life ==
Falconer was born on 23 September 1943 in Fern Tree Gully, Victoria. He holds the degree of Bachelor of Economics (Hons.) from Monash University. He worked as a management consultant prior to entering politics.

== Early political involvement ==
Falconer was state president of the Young Liberals in 1969. He was elected to the party's state executive in the same year, serving until 1974, and was a state vice-president from 1974 to 1975. Before his election to parliament he worked as press secretary to Senator Ivor Greenwood and private secretary to Billy Snedden. At the 1970 national conference of the Young Liberals he successfully moved a motion calling on state and federal governments to "promote and coordinate research into the effects and control of air and other pollution in Australia".

== Parliamentary career ==
In 1974, Falconer defeated former government minister Peter Howson for Liberal preselection in the seat of Casey, which Howson had lost in 1972. He stood unsuccessfully against the incumbent Australian Labor Party (ALP) member Race Mathews at the 1974 election. He reprised his candidacy at the 1975 federal election and defeated Mathews on a large swing as the Coalition won a landslide victory.

In parliament, Falconer served as chair of the parliamentary interest group supporting Amnesty International. In 1980 he became one of the first MPs to ask a parliamentary question on animal welfare, following a confrontation between police and protesters over the live export of sheep from Portland, Victoria. During the Franklin Dam controversy he was one of the few Liberal MPs to oppose construction of the dam, including speaking at an anti-dam rally.

Falconer's seat became increasingly marginal during his time in parliament. He narrowly retained Casey at the 1980 election, despite he and Marshall Baillieu being targeted by the Movement Against Uranium Mining for their support of the nuclear industry. However, he was defeated by the ALP candidate Pete Steedman at the 1983 election.

Parliament of Australia
Preceded by Race Mathews	Member for Casey; 1975 – 1983	Succeeded by Peter Steedman
