= Squire Reid =

Australian politician (1887–1949)

Member of the Victorian Legislative Assembly for Oakleigh
- In office 9 April 1927 – 22 April 1932
- Preceded by: District created
- Succeeded by: James Vinton Smith
- In office 2 October 1937 – 9 October 1947
- Preceded by: James Vinton Smith
- Succeeded by: John Lechte

Personal details
- Born: Squire Horace Reid; 11 September 1887 Port Melbourne, Victoria
- Died: 29 July 1949 (aged 61) Carnegie, Victoria, Australia
- Party: Labor Party
- Spouse: Margaret Moore (m. 1908)
- Occupation: Cigar manufacturer

Squire Horace Reid (11 September 1887 – 29 July 1949) was an Australian politician.

Reid was born in Port Melbourne, Victoria to Captain John Robert Reid, a military officer from Greenock, Scotland, and Hannah Lory. He was educated in Annandale, New South Wales and Albert Park. In 1902, he was employed by the States Cigar Factory where he worked for 25 years until his election to parliament.

He held the seat of Oakleigh in the Victorian Legislative Assembly on two occasions, from 1927 to 1932, when he was defeated by James Vinton Smith, then after regaining the seat, from 1937 until 1947.

After his defeat by John Lechte in 1947, Reid worked as a cigar manufacturer, and was involved in sport administration, serving as president of the Victorian Football Association from 1947 until his death.

Victorian Legislative Assembly
District created	Member for Oakleigh; 1927–1932	Succeeded by James Vinton Smith
Preceded by James Vinton Smith	Member for Oakleigh; 1937–1947	Succeeded by John Lechte
