= Peter Steedman =

Australian politician (1943–2024)

Member of the Australian Parliament for Casey
- In office 5 March 1983 – 1 December 1984
- Preceded by: Peter Falconer
- Succeeded by: Bob Halverson

Personal details
- Born: 7 December 1943 Melbourne, Victoria, Australia
- Died: 10 July 2024 (aged 80)
- Party: Labor
- Occupation: Journalist

Alan Peter Steedman (7 December 1943 – 10 July 2024) was an Australian journalist and politician. He represented the Australian Labor Party (ALP) in the House of Representatives from 1983 to 1984, holding the Victorian seat of Casey.

== Early life ==
Steedman was born in Melbourne on 7 December 1943.

At Melbourne University Steedman edited Farrago, the Melbourne University Student Union paper. He also edited Lot's Wife at Monash University. After leaving university he joined The Age as "editor of a section aimed at the youth market".

He travelled to the United Kingdom, where in the early 1970s he was managing editor of Oz magazine during the period when the principal editors were facing the longest trial in British criminal history, for conspiracy to corrupt public morals.

== Politics ==
In September 1982, Steedman won ALP preselection for the Division of Casey. He was elected to the House of Representatives at the 1983 federal election, defeating the incumbent Liberal MP Peter Falconer. However, a redistribution made his seat marginally Liberal and he was defeated at the 1984 election by Liberal Bob Halverson.

In parliament, Steedman attracted attention for wearing jeans and a leather jacket to sittings of the House. He used parliamentary privilege on several occasions to allege that members of the Liberal and National parties were neo-Nazis, notably accusing Senator Florence Bjelke-Petersen of associating with a man he described as "one of Australia's most notorious Nazis and Hitler lovers".

Steedman was an unsuccessful candidate for ALP preselection at the 1986 Scullin by-election. His candidacy brought him into conflict with former state secretary Bill Hartley, who made public comments disparaging him. He was later defeated by Jenny Macklin for preselection in Jagajaga prior to the 1996 federal election. Steedman remained involved in the ALP as a delegate to state and national conferences. In 1990 he argued against the Hawke government's proposed privatisation of Qantas and Trans Australia Airlines, stating that Treasurer Paul Keating had "systematically and knowingly stuffed the airlines up and starved them of funds" as part of a strategy to "sabotage them".

== Other activities ==
Steedman was the executive director of Ausmusic from 1988 to 1996. The organisation was established with financial assistance from the federal government to support the Australian music industry. It was sold in March 1998 to Entertainment World Limited.

Steedman later coordinated a campaign to revive the Healesville railway line as a tourist line servicing the Yarra Valley.

== Personal life and death ==
Steedman previously owned a 4-hectare (9.9-acre) property in Hurstbridge, Victoria, with his wife Julie Reiter, a potter. He bought the property in the 1970s from playwright David Williamson, a university friend.

Steedman died on 10 July 2024, at the age of 80.

Parliament of Australia
Preceded by Peter Falconer	Member for Casey; 1983–1984	Succeeded by Bob Halverson
