= Race Mathews =

Australian politician (1935–2025)

The Honourable Race Mathews
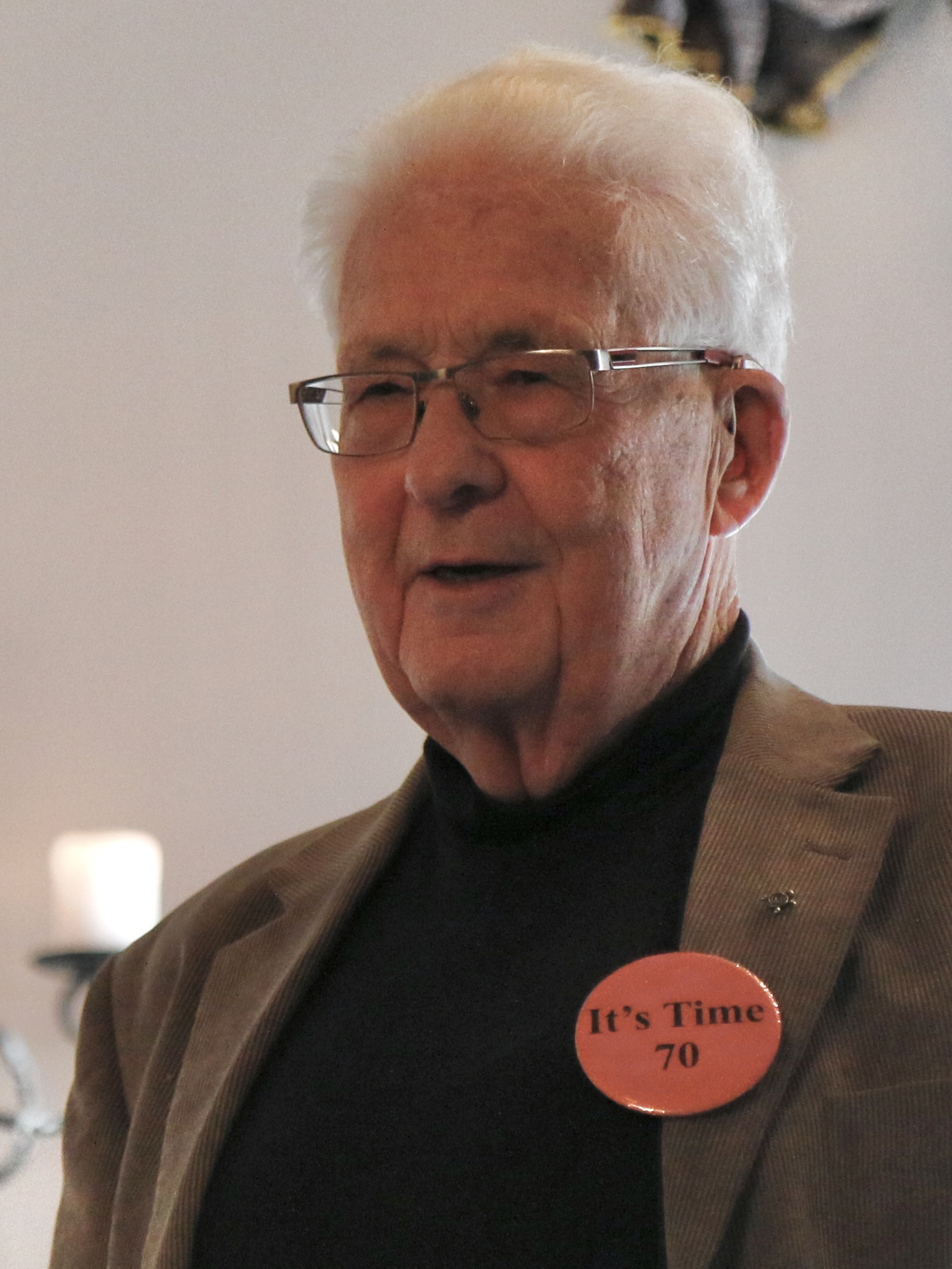
- Mathews in 2018

Member of the Australian Parliament for Casey
- In office 2 December 1972 – 13 December 1975
- Preceded by: Peter Howson
- Succeeded by: Peter Falconer

Member of the Victorian Legislative Assembly for Oakleigh
- In office 5 May 1979 – 2 October 1992
- Preceded by: Alan Scanlan
- Succeeded by: Denise McGill

Victorian Minister for the Arts, Minister for Police and Emergency Services and Minister for Community Services
- In office 1982–1988

Personal details
- Born: 27 March 1935 Melbourne, Victoria, Australia
- Died: 5 May 2025 (aged 90) Melbourne, Victoria, Australia
- Party: Labor
- Spouse: Geraldine (Jill) McKeown (m. 1956; died 1970) Iola Hack (m. 1972)
- Children: 5
- Occupation: Politician, Author

Charles Race Thorson Mathews (27 March 1935 – 5 May 2025) was an Australian politician, academic, author and reformer. He was a member of Australia's Federal Parliament and the Victorian State Parliament for the Australian Labor Party (ALP).

== Early life and education ==
Mathews was born in Melbourne, Victoria. He was educated at Melbourne Grammar School and Toorak Teachers' College, after which he taught in primary schools in Gippsland and Melbourne from 1953–1958. In 1961, he began as a clinical speech therapist in the Victorian Education Department after graduating from the Victorian Council of Speech Therapy. In later years he took out degrees from Melbourne University, Monash University and the University of Divinity.

== Political career ==
Mathews joined the Labor Party in 1956 in Moe. In 1958, he moved to Croydon, where he became active in the party, organising federal and state campaigns and was secretary of the Scoresby State Electoral Council (SEC). In 1963, he was elected to Croydon Council and served there until 1966. In 1964, he stood unsuccessfully for the state seat of Box Hill. In 1960, Mathews was elected secretary of the Australian Fabian Society. He was secretary or president most of the time until 2006. During his leadership the Fabian Society became a major think tank for the Whitlam and the Hawke–Keating governments.

From 1967–1972, he served as Principal Private Secretary to Gough Whitlam Leader of the Opposition in the Australian Parliament, where he helped develop Labor's policies on Education and Medibank (later Medicare).

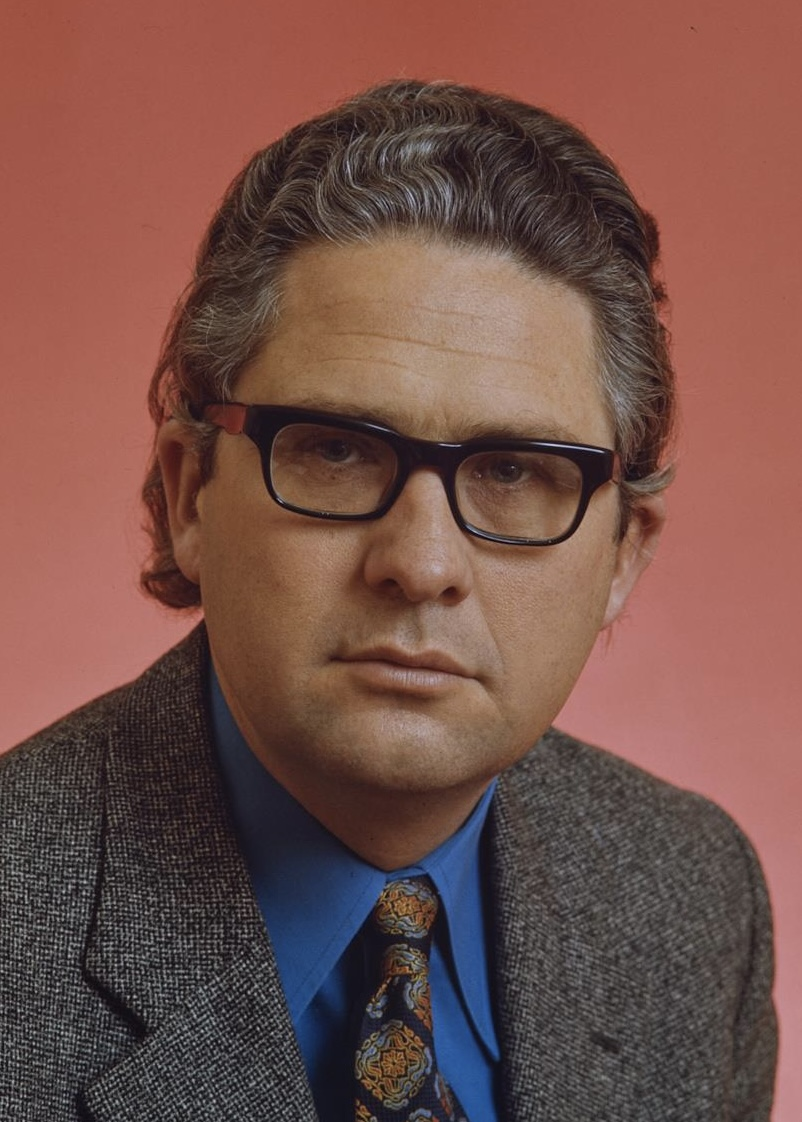
Mathews in 1974

From 1972 to 1975, Mathews was the Federal Member for Casey, where he served as the chairman of the House of Representatives Select Committee on Specific Learning Difficulties (1974–1975), and the chairman of the Government Members' Committee on Urban and Regional Development (1973–1975). He was a member of the Administrative Committee of the Victorian ALP from 1970–1977 and 1977–1981.

From 1976–1979, Mathews was Principal Private Secretary for Clyde Holding and then Frank Wilkes as Leaders of the Opposition in the Parliament of Victoria.

From 1979 to 1992, Mathews served as the State Member for Oakleigh in the Victorian Legislative Assembly during the Cain Government. In this capacity, Mathews served as the chairman of the Ministerial Advisory Committee on Co-operatives, the Minister for Police and Emergency Services and Minister for the Arts 1982–1987. He served as Minister for Community Services from 1987–1988.

As Minister for Police and Emergency Services, he introduced gun control, a major review of the police force and improved disaster management after the 1983 Ash Wednesday bushfires.

As Minister for the Arts, he opened the Arts Centre on Southbank, established the Spoleto International Festival of the Arts, the Melbourne Writer's Festival and oversaw Victoria's 150th celebrations. His two portfolios of Police and Arts overlapped in 1986 with the theft of Picasso's Weeping Woman from the National Gallery of Victoria by the 'Australian Cultural Terrorists', who wanted more funding for young artists. The painting was returned two weeks later unharmed.

He was a member of the Public Accounts Committee 1980–1982, the Privileges Committee 1988–1992, and the Economic and Budget Review Committee 1989–1992.

Mathews was the author, co-author, or editor of numerous books on politics, co operatives and economics. These include Building the Society of Equals: Worker Co-operatives and the A.L.P., Australia's First Fabians, Whitlam Re-visited: Policy Development, Policies and Outcomes, Labor's Troubled Times, Turning the Tide: Towards a Mutualist Philosophy and Politics for Labor and the Left, Jobs of Our Own and Of Labour and Liberty: Distributism in Victoria, 1891-1966.

In the context of co-operative economics, Mathews supported distributism and strongly favoured worker cooperatives as the basis of a left-wing economic model.

== Academic career and co-operatives ==
While in parliament from 1990–1992 Mathews was part-time Visiting Fellow in the Public Sector Management Institute (PSMI) at Monash University. After leaving parliament he became senior research fellow in the PSMI, then in the Graduate School of Government at Monash University 1995–1996 and Senior Research Fellow in the International Centre for Management in Government at Monash 1996–2000. While at Monash he published Whitlam Re-visited with Hugh Emy and Owen Hughes and Australia's First Fabians.

In the 1980s, Mathews became very involved in the co-operative movement, especially the Mondragon Corporation in Spain, which he visited several times. He was chairman of the Ministerial Advisory Committee on Co-operatives 1989–1992, and wrote two Fabian pamphlets on co-operatives, Building the Society of Equals and Mondragon Lessons for Australia.

After leaving the parliament Mathews continued his research. In 1998, he completed a PhD at Monash University on Mondragon, Antigonish and 'evolved distributism'. He turned his PhD thesis into Jobs of Our Own: Building a Stake-Holder Society, published in 1999.

Mathews then turned his attention to the history of the co-operative movement in Australia and its link to Catholic Social Teaching in the 1930s to 1950s. He enrolled in the University of Divinity and was awarded a Doctor of Theology in 2014. He turned his thesis into Of Labour and Liberty: Distributism in Victoria, 1891 - 1966, published in 2017.

== Other activities ==
Mathews developed an interest in science fiction as a boy and at the age of 16 was instrumental in founding the Melbourne Science Fiction Club in 1952. He opened two World Science Fiction Conventions (Worldcons) in Melbourne, in 1975 and 1985.

Throughout his life, Mathews was driven by a commitment to equality, democracy and empowerment, and inspired and mentored others. In the 1960s, he helped Whitlam bring about reform of the Victorian ALP, leading to 'Intervention' in 1970. From the 1990s on, Mathews campaigned again for reform of the Labor Party, so that the factions would be "on tap, but not on top" and local members would have more say. He also campaigned for the reform of the parliament, and in 2006 helped establish the Accountability Round Table, and was its first chairman.

Mathews was on the board of the Melbourne Recital Centre from 2004–2009 and the Australian Centre for the Moving Image (ACMI) for 2006–2008. In 2009 he was involved in a successful campaign to save the independence of the Victorian College of the Arts.

== Personal life and death ==
Mathews met his first wife Geraldine (Jill) McKeown at Teachers College in 1953. They married in 1956. She died of cancer in 1970. They had three children.

In 1971, Mathews became close to Ainsley Gotto, personal private secretary to Liberal Party leader John Gorton (prime minister from 1968 to 1971). Most of the media were aware of the relationship with Gotto but did not report on it. Mathews told Whitlam, who was very tolerant: "You've got to be careful about your pillow talk".

In 1972, Mathews married Iola Hack, a journalist at The Age. They have two children. Iola Mathews co-founded the Women's Electoral Lobby and later worked within the Australian Council of Trade Unions (ACTU) to achieve workplace gender equality in the 1980s and 1990s, for which she was awarded an Order of Australia Medal (OAM). She is the author of a history of Barton Hack and his family, Chequered Lives.

Mathews died from Alzheimer's disease in Melbourne, on 5 May 2025, at the age of 90.

== Biography ==
Race Mathews: A Life in Politics by Iola Mathews, Monash University Press 2024

Parliament of Australia
Preceded by Peter Howson	Member for Casey; 1972–1975	Succeeded by Peter Falconer
Victorian Legislative Assembly
Preceded by Alan Scanlan	Member for Oakleigh; 1979–1992	Succeeded by Denise McGill
Political offices
Preceded by Norman Lacy	Minister for the Arts; 1982–1987	Succeeded by Ian Cathie
