= Denise McGill =

Australian politician

Denise Frances McGill OAM (born 11 December 1946 in Melbourne, Victoria, Australia). McGill was a state politician for the Liberal Party who has held the seat of Oakleigh from October 1992 until August 1999. McGill was councillor of Oakleigh from 1987 until 1994 and in that time was mayor from 1991 until 1992. She has also been president, vice-president and secretary of Clayton Branch of Liberal Party since 1985. McGill is married and has four children.

McGill was awarded a Medal of the Order of Australia (OAM) in the 2008 Queen's Birthday Honours "For service to the community through local government and the Parliament of Victoria."
