= Electoral district of Oakleigh =

State electoral district of Victoria, Australia

Oakleigh Victoria—Legislative Assembly
- Interactive map of electoral district boundaries from the 2022 state election
- State: Victoria
- Created: 1927
- MP: Steve Dimopoulos
- Party: Labor Party
- Namesake: Suburb of Oakleigh
- Electors: 41,595 (2018)
- Area: 32 km^{2} (12.4 sq mi)
- Demographic: Metropolitan

The electoral district of Oakleigh is an electoral district of the Victorian Legislative Assembly. It covers the south-east Melbourne suburbs of Carnegie, Murrumbeena, Hughesdale, Notting Hill, Oakleigh East, Oakleigh and parts of Chadstone, Glen Waverley, Mount Waverley, Glen Huntly, Mulgrave and Ormond.

The seat is Labor Party held within the inner south-east metropolitan Melbourne.

Steve Dimopoulos is the current member of parliament for Oakleigh.

== Members for Oakleigh ==
Member	Party	Term
Squire Reid	Labor	1927–1932
James Vinton Smith	United Australia	1932–1937
Squire Reid	Labor	1937–1947
John Lechte	Liberal	1947–1950
Val Doube	Labor	1950–1961
Alan Scanlan	Liberal	1961–1979
Race Mathews	Labor	1979–1992
Denise McGill	Liberal	1992–1999
Ann Barker	Labor	1999–2014
Steve Dimopoulos	Labor	2014–present

== Election results ==
2022 Victorian state election: Oakleigh
Party	Candidate	Votes	%	±%
Labor	Steve Dimopoulos	19,778	45.0	−8.3
Liberal	Jim Grivokostopoulos	12,848	29.3	−0.5
Greens	Hsiang-Han Hsieh	7,278	16.6	+5.2
Ind. (Australia One)	Dominique Murphy	1,084	2.5	+2.5
Animal Justice	Loraine Fabb	1,014	2.3	+0.3
Family First	Edward Sok	904	2.1	+2.1
Freedom	Anthony Charles Jacobs	770	1.7	+1.7
Independent	Parashos Kioupelis	234	0.5	+0.5
Total formal votes		43,910	95.6	+0.4
Informal votes		2,000	4.4	−0.4
Turnout		45,910	88.4	+0.6
Two-party-preferred result
Labor	Steve Dimopoulos	27,876	63.5	−2.6
Liberal	Jim Grivokostopoulos	16,034	36.5	+2.6
Labor hold		Swing	−2.6	
