= Bob Halverson =

Australian politician (1937–2016)

The Honourable Bob Halverson OBE

22nd Speaker of the Australian House of Representatives
- In office 30 April 1996 – 3 March 1998
- Preceded by: Stephen Martin
- Succeeded by: Ian Sinclair

Member of the Australian Parliament for Casey
- In office 1 December 1984 – 31 August 1998
- Preceded by: Peter Steedman
- Succeeded by: Michael Wooldridge

Personal details
- Born: 22 October 1937 Springvale, Victoria, Australia
- Died: 9 February 2016 (aged 78) Holbrook, New South Wales
- Party: Liberal Party of Australia
- Occupation: RAAF officer

Military service
- Branch/service: Royal Australian Air Force
- Years of service: 1956–1981
- Rank: Group Captain
- Awards: Officer of the Order of the British Empire

Robert George Halverson, OBE (22 October 1937 – 9 February 2016) was an Australian politician, air force officer and diplomat. He was a member of the House of Representatives from 1984 to 1998, representing the Liberal Party. He was Speaker of the House from 1996 to 1998, and subsequently served as Ambassador to Ireland from 1998 to 2003.

== Early life ==
Halverson was born on 22 October 1937 in Springvale, Victoria. He was the son of Elizabeth Gretta (née Ordner) and Herbert Martinius Halverson. His father worked as an electrician at a meatworks in Footscray. His paternal grandfather Bendik Halverson was a Norwegian sailor who arrived in Australia in the 1870s.

Halverson was educated at Geelong Road Primary School and Footscray Technical College. At the age of 16, as an air force cadet, he was one of four Air Training Corps members chosen to fly to England and meet Sir Winston Churchill. He left school in 1953 and began an apprenticeship as an industrial chemist.

== Air force career ==
Halverson served in the Royal Australian Air Force (RAAF) from 1956 to 1981, attaining the rank of group captain. He enlisted as an airman, but was selected to join the Officer Cadet School where he topped his year. His first posting was to RAAF Base Townsville, where an explosion left him deaf in one ear and ended his ambitions to become a pilot. He was subsequently transferred back to Melbourne where he worked in supply and equipment.

In 1966, Halverson moved to Washington, D.C., in connection with the RAAF's purchase of F-111 fighter jets. He returned to Australia but moved overseas again in 1976, when he was seconded to the British Royal Air Force's RAF Support Command for three years. He was made an Officer of the Order of the British Empire in 1978. Halverson retired from the RAAF in 1981.

== Politics ==
Halverson was elected to federal parliament at the 1984 federal election, winning the Division of Casey for the Liberal Party. He attracted attention in 1989 when he referred to government MP Elizabeth Harvey as "baby" during question time in the House of Representatives. He refused Harvey's call for an apology, stating that it was a gender-neutral term and was not sexist. In 1990, Halverson was appointed Opposition Whip in the House of Representatives under the new party leader John Hewson. He was stripped of the position when his relationship with Hewson broke down after the 1993 election defeat, but regained it in May 1994 when Alexander Downer became leader. He subsequently assumed the title Chief Opposition Whip.

After the Coalition's victory at the 1996 federal election, Halverson was elected Speaker of the House of Representatives. He resigned the position in March 1998 as the Howard government became frustrated at his impartiality in enforcing discipline on both Government and opposition MPs and allowing supplementary questioning of ministers when answers were evasive. He usually wore the Speaker's traditional gown, but without the wig.

== Later life ==
Halverson retired from politics at the 1998 election and was appointed the Australian Ambassador to Ireland and the Holy See, which he remained until 2003 when he was succeeded by John Herron. He died of cancer in 2016.

Parliament of Australia
Preceded by Stephen Martin	Speaker of the House of Representatives; 1996–1998	Succeeded by Ian Sinclair
Preceded by Peter Steedman	Member for Casey; 1984–1998	Succeeded by Michael Wooldridge
Diplomatic posts
Preceded by Edward Stevens	Australian Ambassador to the Holy See and Australian Ambassador to Ireland; 1998–2003	Succeeded by John Herron
