= Aaron Violi =

Australian politician (born 1984)

Aaron Violi MP

Shadow Minister for Science, Technology and Innovation Shadow Minister for Cyber Security Shadow Minister for the Digital Economy
- Incumbent
- Assumed office 23 February 2026
- Leader: Angus Taylor
- Preceded by: Claire Chandler (as Shadow Minister for Science and Shadow Minister for the Digital Economy)

Chief Opposition Whip in the House of Representatives
- In office 28 May 2025 – 23 February 2026
- Deputy: Cameron Caldwell; Henry Pike
- Leader: Sussan Ley
- Preceded by: Bert van Manen
- Succeeded by: Cameron Caldwell

Member of the Australian Parliament for Casey
- Incumbent
- Assumed office 21 May 2022
- Preceded by: Tony Smith

Personal details
- Born: 6 August 1984 (age 42) Canberra, Australia
- Party: Liberal
- Spouse: Rachel Violi
- Children: 2
- Education: La Trobe University, Deakin University
- Occupation: Sales manager, political staffer

Aaron Violi (born 6 August 1984) is an Australian politician. He is a member of the Liberal Party and has served in the House of Representatives since the 2022 federal election, representing the Victorian seat of Casey.

== Early life and education ==
Aaron Violi was born in Canberra on 6 August 1984, after his family emigrated from Italy to Silvan, Victoria in 1953.

He was educated at Yarra Glen Primary School and Mount Lilydale Mercy College. He attained a Bachelor of Arts (with Honours) at La Trobe University, then a Masters of Business Administration (MBA) at Deakin University.

== Pre-political career ==
After graduating in 2007, Violi commenced work with food manufacturer Yarra Valley Snack Foods, leading the sales team for seven years, before moving to Mars Australia. In 2019, he transitioned into the digital economy taking up a role at a tech startup, Ritual.

== Politics ==
Before standing for parliament himself, Violi worked as an adviser to Victorian Liberal Party Senator James Paterson.

Violi was elected to represent Casey on 21 May 2022 replacing the retired Tony Smith. He was elected with a margin of 1.5 percent.

Violi was re-elected in the 2025 Australian federal election, defeating the Labor candidate with 52.9 percent of the two party preferred vote. After the election Violi was appointed as the Liberal Party's chief whip in the House of Representatives. In October 2025, Violi was also appointed as Shadow Assistant Minister for Communications in the Ley shadow ministry.

As of October 2025, Violi is aligned with the ‘old guard' National Right faction of the Liberal Party.

In November 2025, as part of an internal Liberal Party debate on climate change action, Violi was one of a small number of Liberal members of the House of Representatives representing capital city seats who spoke in favour of dumping the Liberal Party’s previously held climate policy of reaching net zero emissions by 2050.

In August 2026, Violi, along with Andrew Hastie, Jonathon Duniam, and Kate Chaney, initiated the Joint Select Committee on Artificial Intelligence, which was established on 20 August 2026.

== Personal life ==
Violi lives in Lilydale with his wife Rachel Violi and two children.

== See also ==
- Members of the Australian House of Representatives, 2022–2025
- Members of the Australian House of Representatives, 2025–2028

Parliament of Australia
Preceded by Tony Smith	Member for Casey; 2022–present	Incumbent
