= Electoral results for the Division of Chisholm =

Australian division election results

This is a list of electoral results for the Division of Chisholm in Australian federal elections from the division's creation in 1949 until the present.

== Members ==
Member	Party	Term
(Sir) Wilfrid Kent Hughes	Liberal	1949–1970
Tony Staley	Liberal	1970–1980
Graham Harris	Liberal	1980–1983
Helen Mayer	Labor	1983–1987
Michael Wooldridge	Liberal	1987–1998
Anna Burke	Labor	1998–2016
Julia Banks	Liberal	2016–2018
Julia Banks	Independent	2018–2019
Gladys Liu	Liberal	2019–2022
Carina Garland	Labor	2022–present

== Election results ==
=== Elections in the 2020s ===
==== 2025 ====
2025 Australian federal election: Chisholm
Party	Candidate	Votes	%	±%
Greens	Tim Randall			
Family First	Gary Ong			
One Nation	Guy Livori			
Liberal	Katie Allen			
Trumpet of Patriots	Christine McShane			
Labor	Carina Garland			
Independent	Kath Davies			
Total formal votes				
Informal votes				
Turnout				

==== 2022 ====
2022 Australian federal election: Chisholm
Party	Candidate	Votes	%	±%
Labor	Carina Garland	38,692	40.09	+3.77
Liberal	Gladys Liu	35,038	36.30	−7.70
Greens	Sarah Newman	12,130	12.57	+1.94
United Australia	Melanie Kempson	2,295	2.38	+0.22
Liberal Democrats	Ethelyn King	1,620	1.68	+1.68
Independent	Dominique Murphy	1,590	1.65	+1.65
One Nation	Aaron Tyrrell	1,377	1.43	+1.43
Animal Justice	Rod Whitfield	1,122	1.16	−0.09
Justice	Thomas Stanfield	946	0.98	−0.45
Independent	Wayne Tseng	757	0.78	+0.78
Federation	Anthea Antonie	567	0.59	+0.59
Citizens	Ryan Dare	384	0.40	+0.40
Total formal votes		96,518	95.30	−0.44
Informal votes		4,763	4.70	+0.44
Turnout		101,281	92.20	−2.61
Two-party-preferred result
Labor	Carina Garland	54,448	56.41	+6.86
Liberal	Gladys Liu	42,070	43.59	−6.86
Labor gain from Liberal		Swing	+6.86	

Alluvial diagram for preference flows in the seat of Chisholm in the 2022 federal election. indicates at what stage the winning candidate had over 50% of the votes and was declared the winner.

=== Elections in the 2010s ===
==== 2019 ====
2019 Australian federal election: Chisholm
Party	Candidate	Votes	%	±%
Liberal	Gladys Liu	41,172	43.38	−3.71
Labor	Jennifer Yang	32,561	34.30	−0.39
Greens	Luke Arthur	11,235	11.84	+0.30
Independent	Ian Dobby	2,319	2.44	+2.44
Justice	Anne Wicks	2,063	2.17	+2.17
Animal Justice	Rosemary Lavin	1,780	1.88	−0.24
Democratic Labour	Philip Jenkins	1,702	1.79	+1.79
United Australia	George Zoraya	1,517	1.60	+1.60
Rise Up Australia	Angela Dorian	571	0.60	−0.63
Total formal votes		94,920	95.51	−1.77
Informal votes		4,463	4.49	+1.77
Turnout		99,383	93.47	−0.96
Two-party-preferred result
Liberal	Gladys Liu	48,005	50.57	−2.34
Labor	Jennifer Yang	46,915	49.43	+2.34
Liberal hold		Swing	−2.34	

Julia Banks was elected as the Liberal member for Chisholm in 2016, but resigned from the party in November 2018 and sat as an independent. She unsuccessfully contested Flinders as an independent.

==== 2016 ====
2016 Australian federal election: Chisholm
Party	Candidate	Votes	%	±%
Liberal	Julia Banks	39,265	45.28	+1.16
Labor	Stefanie Perri	31,160	35.93	−3.57
Greens	Josh Fergeus	10,647	12.28	+2.83
Family First	Craig McCracken	2,137	2.46	+1.36
Animal Justice	Nyree Walshe	1,799	2.07	+2.07
Rise Up Australia	Melanie Vassiliou	1,712	1.97	+1.22
Total formal votes		86,720	97.26	+1.49
Informal votes		2,439	2.74	−1.49
Turnout		89,159	91.52	−1.83
Two-party-preferred result
Liberal	Julia Banks	44,437	51.24	+2.84
Labor	Stefanie Perri	42,283	48.76	−2.84
Liberal gain from Labor		Swing	+2.84	

==== 2013 ====
2013 Australian federal election: Chisholm
Party	Candidate	Votes	%	±%
Liberal	John Nguyen	37,990	44.12	+3.90
Labor	Anna Burke	34,015	39.50	−4.75
Greens	Josh Fergeus	8,133	9.45	−2.44
Sex Party	Luzio Grossi	1,762	2.05	+2.05
Palmer United	Brian Woods	1,405	1.63	+1.63
Family First	Martin Myszka	949	1.10	−1.56
Democratic Labour	Pat Shea	860	1.00	+1.00
Rise Up Australia	Melanie Vassiliou	650	0.75	+0.75
Secular	Vidura Jayaratne	345	0.40	−0.20
Total formal votes		86,109	95.77	−0.55
Informal votes		3,802	4.23	+0.55
Turnout		89,911	93.41	−0.28
Two-party-preferred result
Labor	Anna Burke	44,431	51.60	−4.18
Liberal	John Nguyen	41,678	48.40	+4.18
Labor hold		Swing	−4.18	

==== 2010 ====
2010 Australian federal election: Chisholm
Party	Candidate	Votes	%	±%
Labor	Anna Burke	34,492	44.53	−3.59
Liberal	John Nguyen	31,093	40.15	+0.70
Greens	Josh Fergeus	9,196	11.87	+3.40
Family First	Phil Goodman	2,107	2.72	+0.27
Secular	Nimrod Evans	562	0.73	+0.73
Total formal votes		77,450	96.41	−0.98
Informal votes		2,880	3.59	+0.98
Turnout		80,330	93.11	−2.16
Two-party-preferred result
Labor	Anna Burke	43,459	56.11	−1.27
Liberal	John Nguyen	33,991	43.89	+1.27
Labor hold		Swing	−1.27	

=== Elections in the 2000s ===
==== 2007 ====
2007 Australian federal election: Chisholm
Party	Candidate	Votes	%	±%
Labor	Anna Burke	38,439	48.12	+4.13
Liberal	Myles King	31,514	39.45	−4.16
Greens	Alistair McCaskill	6,765	8.47	+1.13
Family First	Gary Ong	1,953	2.45	+0.56
Democrats	Daniel Berk	1,053	1.32	−0.69
Citizens Electoral Council	Lars Thystrup	150	0.19	+0.01
Total formal votes		79,874	97.39	+0.74
Informal votes		2,139	2.61	−0.74
Turnout		82,013	95.22	+0.38
Two-party-preferred result
Labor	Anna Burke	45,833	57.38	+4.73
Liberal	Myles King	34,041	42.62	−4.73
Labor hold		Swing	+4.73	

==== 2004 ====
2004 Australian federal election: Chisholm
Party	Candidate	Votes	%	±%
Labor	Anna Burke	34,241	43.99	+1.61
Liberal	Stephen Hartney	33,945	43.61	−0.01
Greens	Penny Harris	5,715	7.34	+1.17
Democrats	James Bennett	1,561	2.01	−4.73
Family First	Gary Ong	1,468	1.89	+1.89
Independent	Owen Lysaght	763	0.98	+0.98
Citizens Electoral Council	Wayne Barwick	137	0.18	+0.18
Total formal votes		77,830	96.65	−0.34
Informal votes		2,700	3.35	+0.34
Turnout		80,530	94.84	−0.60
Two-party-preferred result
Labor	Anna Burke	40,980	52.65	−0.03
Liberal	Stephen Hartney	36,850	47.35	+0.03
Labor hold		Swing	−0.03	

==== 2001 ====
2001 Australian federal election: Chisholm
Party	Candidate	Votes	%	±%
Liberal	Ros Clowes	34,836	43.58	+1.84
Labor	Anna Burke	33,929	42.44	+0.06
Democrats	James Bennett	5,379	6.73	−0.14
Greens	Howard Tankey	4,898	6.13	+3.03
No GST	John Murray	895	1.12	+1.12
Total formal votes		79,937	96.99	+0.56
Informal votes		2,481	3.01	−0.56
Turnout		82,418	95.26	
Two-party-preferred result
Labor	Anna Burke	42,179	52.77	+0.70
Liberal	Ros Clowes	37,758	47.23	−0.70
Labor hold		Swing	+0.70	

=== Elections in the 1990s ===
==== 1998 ====
1998 Australian federal election: Chisholm
Party	Candidate	Votes	%	±%
Labor	Anna Burke	33,275	42.38	+1.99
Liberal	Peter Vlahos	32,771	41.74	−5.39
Democrats	Bernie Millane	5,392	6.87	−0.40
Greens	Julian Guess	2,431	3.10	+0.44
Unity	Ka-Sing Chua	2,214	2.82	+2.82
One Nation	Douglas Hesse	2,064	2.63	+2.63
Natural Law	Mark Toomey	193	0.25	−0.22
Republican	Nicholas Fell	176	0.22	+0.22
Total formal votes		78,516	96.43	−1.01
Informal votes		2,910	3.57	+1.01
Turnout		81,426	95.68	−0.51
Two-party-preferred result
Labor	Anna Burke	40,887	52.07	+4.67
Liberal	Peter Vlahos	37,629	47.93	−4.67
Labor gain from Liberal		Swing	+4.67	

==== 1996 ====
1996 Australian federal election: Chisholm
Party	Candidate	Votes	%	±%
Liberal	Michael Wooldridge	37,110	47.13	−0.64
Labor	Tony Robinson	31,807	40.39	−4.21
Democrats	Matthew Townsend	5,725	7.27	+1.34
Greens	Adrian Whitehead	2,097	2.66	+2.66
Against Further Immigration	Peter Judge	1,291	1.64	+1.64
Natural Law	Graeme Browne	358	0.47	−0.95
	Mark Ilott	350	0.44	+0.44
Total formal votes		78,748	97.44	−0.01
Informal votes		2,069	2.56	+0.01
Turnout		80,817	96.18	−0.13
Two-party-preferred result
Liberal	Michael Wooldridge	41,190	52.59	+2.20
Labor	Tony Robinson	37,132	47.41	−2.20
Liberal hold		Swing	+2.20	

==== 1993 ====
1993 Australian federal election: Chisholm
Party	Candidate	Votes	%	±%
Liberal	Michael Wooldridge	36,198	50.23	+1.76
Labor	Gordon McCaskie	29,998	41.63	+7.45
Democrats	Doug Johnston	4,620	6.41	−6.98
Natural Law	Richard Aldous	1,247	1.73	+1.73
Total formal votes		72,063	97.68	+0.21
Informal votes		1,714	2.32	−0.21
Turnout		73,777	96.32	
Two-party-preferred result
Liberal	Michael Wooldridge	38,083	52.88	−3.41
Labor	Gordon McCaskie	33,937	47.12	+3.41
Liberal hold		Swing	−3.41	

==== 1990 ====
1990 Australian federal election: Chisholm
Party	Candidate	Votes	%	±%
Liberal	Michael Wooldridge	34,660	48.5	+2.4
Labor	Helen Mayer	24,437	34.2	−10.0
Democrats	Trudi Brunton	9,576	13.4	+6.8
Call to Australia	Adrian Stagg	2,832	4.0	+4.0
Total formal votes		71,505	97.5	
Informal votes		1,861	2.5	
Turnout		73,366	96.1	
Two-party-preferred result
Liberal	Michael Wooldridge	40,230	56.3	+5.9
Labor	Helen Mayer	31,239	43.7	−5.9
Liberal hold		Swing	+5.9	

=== Elections in the 1980s ===
==== 1987 ====
1987 Australian federal election: Chisholm
Party	Candidate	Votes	%	±%
Liberal	Michael Wooldridge	29,705	46.4	+2.1
Labor	Helen Mayer	28,094	43.9	−1.7
Democrats	Fran Robbins	4,222	6.6	+0.4
National	Edward Wajsbrem	1,101	1.7	+0.6
Unite Australia	Ernest Rodeck	637	1.0	+1.0
Independent	Barry Gration	226	0.4	+0.4
Total formal votes		63,985	95.8	
Informal votes		2,772	4.2	
Turnout		66,757	95.7	
Two-party-preferred result
Liberal	Michael Wooldridge	32,400	50.7	+0.9
Labor	Helen Mayer	31,528	49.3	−0.9
Liberal gain from Labor		Swing	+0.9	

==== 1984 ====
1984 Australian federal election: Chisholm
Party	Candidate	Votes	%	±%
Labor	Helen Mayer	28,696	45.6	−2.3
Liberal	Graham Harris	27,860	44.3	+1.9
Democrats	Colin Rochford	3,928	6.2	−0.3
Democratic Labor	Kevin Carroll	1,779	2.8	−0.4
National	Ray Murphy	693	1.1	+1.1
Total formal votes		62,956	92.1	
Informal votes		5,405	7.9	
Turnout		68,361	95.3	
Two-party-preferred result
Labor	Helen Mayer	31,566	50.2	−1.7
Liberal	Graham Harris	31,375	49.8	+1.7
Labor hold		Swing	−1.7	

==== 1983 ====
1983 Australian federal election: Chisholm
Party	Candidate	Votes	%	±%
Labor	Helen Mayer	33,253	48.2	+7.1
Liberal	Graham Harris	29,052	42.1	−5.0
Democrats	Alan Swindon	4,444	6.5	−4.3
Democratic Labor	Kevin Cooper	2,196	3.2	+3.2
Total formal votes		68,945	98.4	
Informal votes		1,128	1.6	
Turnout		70,073	96.3	
Two-party-preferred result
Labor	Helen Mayer	36,019	52.2	+4.4
Liberal	Graham Harris	32,926	47.8	−4.4
Labor gain from Liberal		Swing	+4.4	

==== 1980 ====
1980 Australian federal election: Chisholm
Party	Candidate	Votes	%	±%
Liberal	Graham Harris	32,211	47.1	+0.6
Labor	Helen Mayer	28,058	41.1	+9.6
Democrats	Alan Swindon	7,377	10.8	−6.4
Australia	Terence Pooley	701	1.0	+1.0
Total formal votes		68,347	98.0	
Informal votes		1,394	2.0	
Turnout		69,741	95.3	
Two-party-preferred result
Liberal	Graham Harris	35,652	52.2	−6.7
Labor	Helen Mayer	32,695	47.8	+6.7
Liberal hold		Swing	−6.7	

=== Elections in the 1970s ===
==== 1977 ====
1977 Australian federal election: Chisholm
Party	Candidate	Votes	%	±%
Liberal	Tony Staley	31,808	46.5	−8.9
Labor	Helen Mayer	21,548	31.5	−5.8
Democrats	Robert Caulfield	11,739	17.2	+17.2
Democratic Labor	Joe Stanley	3,299	4.8	−0.2
Total formal votes		68,394	97.9	
Informal votes		1,501	2.1	
Turnout		69,895	95.2	
Two-party-preferred result
Liberal	Tony Staley		58.9	−1.9
Labor	Helen Mayer		41.1	+1.9
Liberal hold		Swing	−1.9	

==== 1975 ====
1975 Australian federal election: Chisholm
Party	Candidate	Votes	%	±%
Liberal	Tony Staley	31,477	57.0	+6.5
Labor	Richard Campbell	19,712	35.7	−5.0
Democratic Labor	Joe Stanley	2,787	5.0	−0.3
Australia	Richard Franklin	1,236	2.2	−1.3
Total formal votes		55,212	98.5	
Informal votes		826	1.5	
Turnout		56,038	95.9	
Two-party-preferred result
Liberal	Tony Staley		62.4	+5.7
Labor	Richard Campbell		37.6	−5.7
Liberal hold		Swing	+5.7	

==== 1974 ====
1974 Australian federal election: Chisholm
Party	Candidate	Votes	%	±%
Liberal	Tony Staley	28,072	50.5	+3.7
Labor	Alastair Nicholson	22,651	40.7	+1.5
Democratic Labor	Joe Stanley	2,933	5.3	−2.3
Australia	Frank Penhalluriack	1,940	3.5	−2.9
Total formal votes		55,596	98.4	
Informal votes		920	1.6	
Turnout		56,516	95.4	
Two-party-preferred result
Liberal	Tony Staley		56.7	+1.3
Labor	Alastair Nicholson		43.3	−1.3
Liberal hold		Swing	+1.3	

==== 1972 ====
1972 Australian federal election: Chisholm
Party	Candidate	Votes	%	±%
Liberal	Tony Staley	24,622	46.8	−6.1
Labor	Alastair Nicholson	20,608	39.2	+5.1
Democratic Labor	William Hoyne	4,006	7.6	−1.4
Australia	Robert Cowley	3,354	6.4	+2.5
Total formal votes		52,590	98.5	
Informal votes		811	1.5	
Turnout		53,401	95.5	
Two-party-preferred result
Liberal	Tony Staley	29,110	55.4	−7.2
Labor	Alastair Nicholson	23,480	44.6	+7.2
Liberal hold		Swing	−7.2	

==== 1970 by-election ====
Chisholm by-election, 1970
Party	Candidate	Votes	%	±%
Liberal	Tony Staley	24,767	54.1	+1.2
Labor	Frank Costigan	15,335	33.5	−0.6
Defence of Government Schools	Ray Nilsen	4,138	9.0	+9.0
Australia	Andrew Morrow	1,501	3.3	−0.6
Total formal votes		45,741	98.4	
Informal votes		756	1.6	
Turnout		46,497	82.0	
Two-party-preferred result
Liberal	Tony Staley		59.0	−3.6
Labor	Frank Costigan		41.0	+3.6
Liberal hold		Swing	−3.6	

=== Elections in the 1960s ===
==== 1969 ====
1969 Australian federal election: Chisholm
Party	Candidate	Votes	%	±%
Liberal	Sir Wilfrid Kent Hughes	27,783	52.9	−5.9
Labor	Anthony Dwyer	17,912	34.1	+7.5
Democratic Labor	John Rogers	4,747	9.0	+0.0
Australia	Andrew Morrow	2,053	3.9	+3.9
Total formal votes		52,495	97.9	
Informal votes		1,115	2.1	
Turnout		53,610	94.8	
Two-party-preferred result
Liberal	Sir Wilfrid Kent Hughes		62.6	−7.9
Labor	Anthony Dwyer		37.4	+7.9
Liberal hold		Swing	−7.9	

==== 1966 ====
1966 Australian federal election: Chisholm
Party	Candidate	Votes	%	±%
Liberal	Sir Wilfrid Kent Hughes	22,556	58.5	−1.5
Labor	Kenneth Grigg	10,359	26.9	−2.6
Democratic Labor	Mary Stanley	4,199	10.9	+0.4
Independent	Clive Malseed	1,446	3.8	+3.8
Total formal votes		68,560	97.5	
Informal votes		988	2.5	
Turnout		39,548	95.8	
Two-party-preferred result
Liberal	Sir Wilfrid Kent Hughes		70.2	+0.7
Labor	Kenneth Grigg		29.8	−0.7
Liberal hold		Swing	+0.7	

==== 1963 ====
1963 Australian federal election: Chisholm
Party	Candidate	Votes	%	±%
Liberal	Sir Wilfrid Kent Hughes	24,139	60.0	+4.4
Labor	John Button	11,878	29.5	−1.8
Democratic Labor	John Duffy	4,230	10.5	−2.7
Total formal votes		40,247	99.1	
Informal votes		352	0.9	
Turnout		40,599	96.1	
Two-party-preferred result
Liberal	Sir Wilfrid Kent Hughes		69.5	+2.0
Labor	John Button		30.5	−2.0
Liberal hold		Swing	+2.0	

==== 1961 ====
1961 Australian federal election: Chisholm
Party	Candidate	Votes	%	±%
Liberal	Sir Wilfrid Kent Hughes	22,276	55.6	−4.4
Labor	Malcolm Coughlin	12,524	31.3	+2.6
Democratic Labor	John Duffy	5,273	13.2	+1.9
Total formal votes		40,073	98.4	
Informal votes		658	1.6	
Turnout		40,731	95.3	
Two-party-preferred result
Liberal	Sir Wilfrid Kent Hughes		67.5	−2.7
Labor	Malcolm Coughlin		32.5	+2.7
Liberal hold		Swing	−2.7	

=== Elections in the 1950s ===
==== 1958 ====
1958 Australian federal election: Chisholm
Party	Candidate	Votes	%	±%
Liberal	Sir Wilfrid Kent Hughes	24,026	60.0	−5.1
Labor	Leo Bartley	11,494	28.7	+3.7
Democratic Labor	John Hoare	4,547	11.3	+1.4
Total formal votes		40,067	98.1	
Informal votes		766	1.9	
Turnout		40,833	95.7	
Two-party-preferred result
Liberal	Sir Wilfrid Kent Hughes		70.2	−4.0
Labor	Leo Bartley		29.8	+4.0
Liberal hold		Swing	−4.0	

==== 1955 ====
1955 Australian federal election: Chisholm
Party	Candidate	Votes	%	±%
Liberal	Wilfrid Kent Hughes	26,394	65.1	+0.1
Labor	John Stewart	10,114	25.0	−10.0
Labor (A-C)	Leonora Lloyd	4,006	9.9	+9.9
Total formal votes		40,514	98.1	
Informal votes		786	1.9	
Turnout		41,300	94.8	
Two-party-preferred result
Liberal	Wilfrid Kent Hughes		73.0	+8.0
Labor	John Stewart		27.0	−8.0
Liberal hold		Swing	+8.0	

==== 1954 ====
1954 Australian federal election: Chisholm
Party	Candidate	Votes	%	±%
Liberal	Wilfrid Kent Hughes	26,775	65.0	+0.0
Labor	Les Cahill	14,390	35.0	−0.0
Total formal votes		41,165	99.1	
Informal votes		387	0.9	
Turnout		41,552	95.7	
Liberal hold		Swing	+0.0	

==== 1951 ====
1951 Australian federal election: Chisholm
Party	Candidate	Votes	%	±%
Liberal	Wilfrid Kent Hughes	27,016	65.0	+0.3
Labor	Ronald Whiting	14,563	35.0	+1.9
Total formal votes		41,579	98.8	
Informal votes		501	1.2	
Turnout		42,080	95.7	
Liberal hold		Swing	+0.1	

=== Elections in the 1940s ===
==== 1949 ====
1949 Australian federal election: Chisholm
Party	Candidate	Votes	%	±%
Liberal	Wilfrid Kent Hughes	26,628	64.7	+4.1
Labor	Leo Fennessy	13,615	33.1	+0.1
Communist	Bill Tregear	937	2.3	+2.3
Total formal votes		41,180	98.5	
Informal votes		648	1.5	
Turnout		41,828	96.7	
Two-party-preferred result
Liberal	Wilfrid Kent Hughes		64.9	+3.8
Labor	Leo Fennessy		35.1	−3.8
Liberal notional hold		Swing	+3.8	
