= 2019 Australian Parliament infiltration plot =

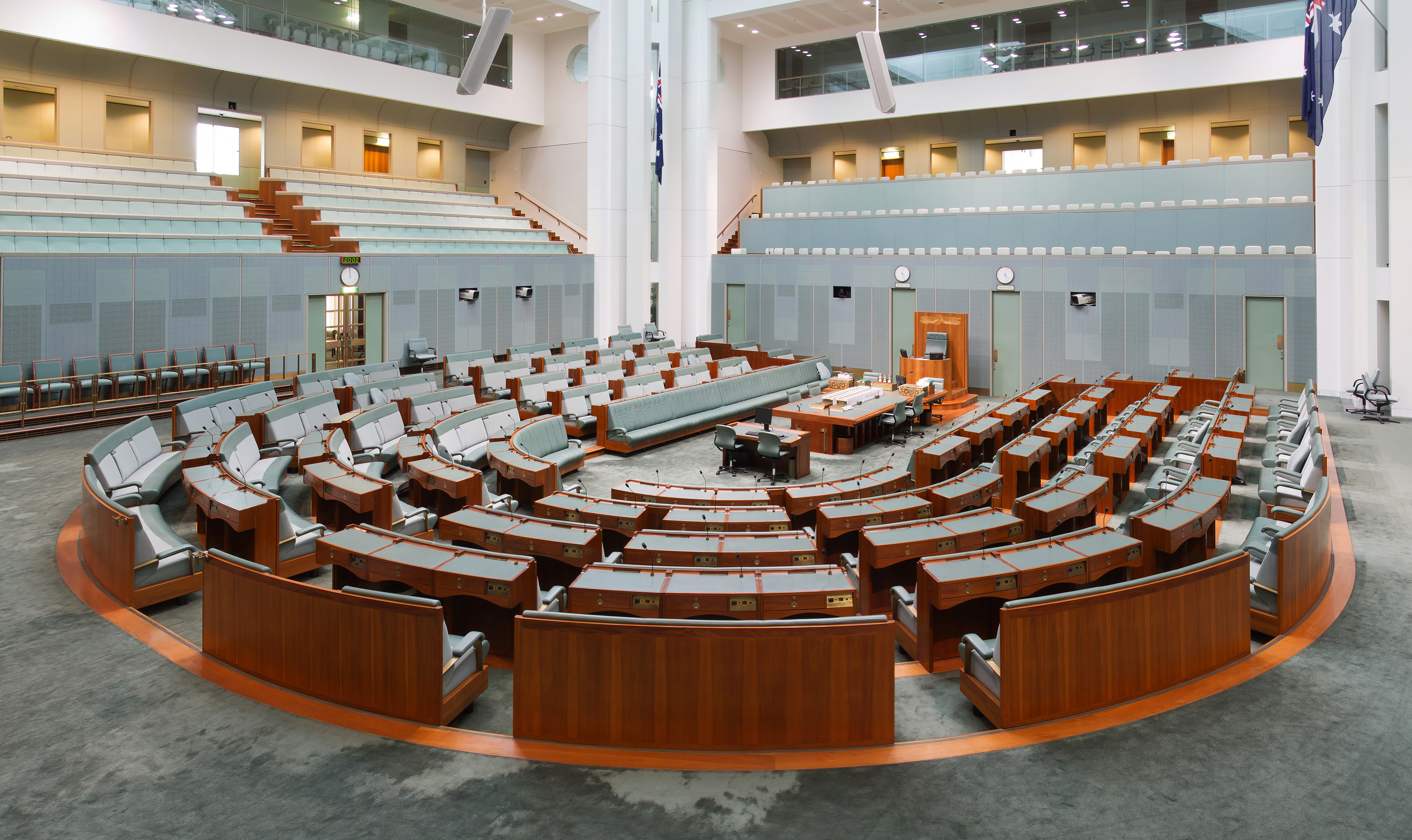
Chamber of the Australia House of Representatives

In late 2019, various media outlets around the world reported on alleged efforts by the People's Republic of China to infiltrate the Parliament of Australia by recruiting a spy to run in the Division of Chisholm in Melbourne during the 2019 Australian federal election.

== Alleged plot ==
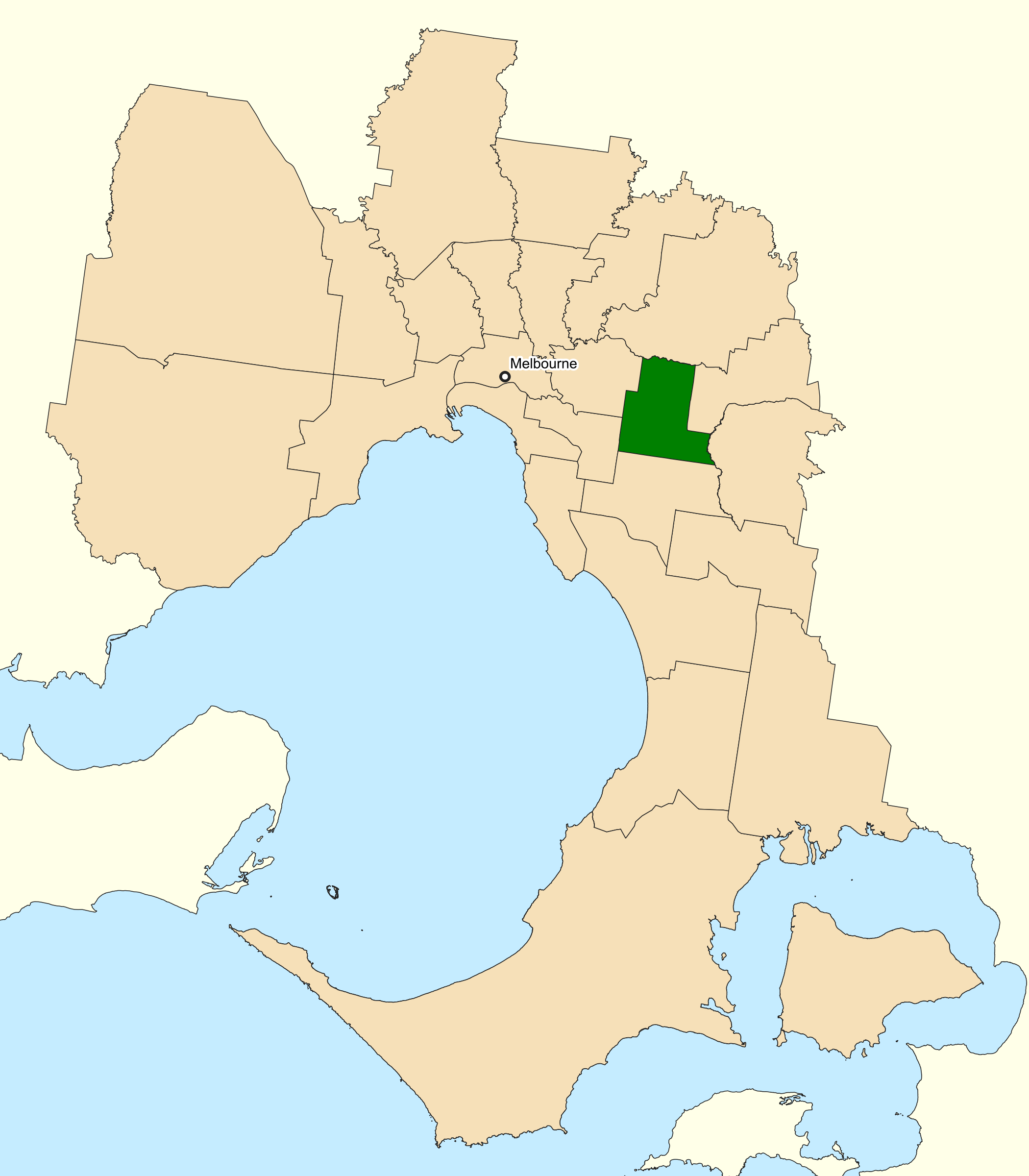
Division of Chisholm

The alleged plot was made public during the 24 November 2019 airing of 60 Minutes on Australia's Nine Network, citing sources with knowledge of the plot. It was suggested that Chinese spies offered $1 million to fund a man's campaign for the Division of Chisholm. The Division of Chisholm is noted to contain many voters of Chinese heritage.

In 2018, the incident was reported to the Australian Security Intelligence Organisation (ASIO) by Bo "Nick" Zhao, who had claimed that he had been approached with the offer. Neither the Nine Network nor ASIO have confirmed when the approach to Zhao took place.

== Parties reportedly involved ==
=== Bo "Nick" Zhao ===
Nick Zhao Bo
- 趙波 or 周波
- Died: March 2019 (aged 32); Mount Waverley, Victoria, Australia
- Occupation: Car dealership owner
- Political party: Victorian Liberal Party

The target of the plot was reported to be Bo "Nick" Zhao, who once owned a number of car dealerships and lived in Glen Iris, an inner-eastern suburb of Melbourne, with his wife and daughter.

Two of Zhao's former business associates described him as an ambitious man who got ahead of himself and wanted to make money quick.

According to The Age, Australian court records shown Zhao had been charged with obtaining financial advantage by deception in 2017, after he allegedly obtained loans via fraudulent means in order to buy luxury vehicles. In 2018, Administrators began to pursue Zhao over the collapse of his car dealership in Brighton.

Zhao was in jail in October 2018, when preselection for the 2019 federal election was being held.

By early 2019, Zhao had a fallout with his wife amid disputes over debts owed to individuals described by media reports as "shadowy" Chinese investors. Reports say Zhao owed millions of dollars to creditors who had become increasingly angry over time.

In March 2019, Zhao was found dead in a hotel room in the suburb of Mount Waverley. The death happened just days prior to him intending to plead guilty in court to various fraud offenses.

Zhao's death prompted a coroner's inquiry into the incident. In September 2020, a coroner in Victoria ruled that Zhao died of suicide, having apparently overdosed on medication while under intense financial pressure ahead of sentencing for fraud offences.

==== Involvement with the Liberal Party ====
Records kept by the Liberal Party show Zhao as a party member in the Division of Chisholm from 2015 until his death. Andrew Hastie, a Liberal MP who chairs the Parliamentary Joint Committee on Intelligence and Security, describe Zhao as a paid-up member of the Liberal Party.

Sources familiar with Zhao's activities, however, described him as a low-profile member of the local Liberal Party branch. They say Zhao attended at least one branch gathering with members of his immediate family before the 2016 Federal election, but did not otherwise agitate to become an MP himself. They say Zhao stopped attending party events in 2016 amidst personal problems.

A senior Liberal Party member with knowledge of membership lists also said Zhao was not known to senior party members, by any measure. Scott Yung, a Chinese-Australian Liberal Party member, said he does not believe Zhao was ever "active" within the party.

=== Brian Chen Chunsheng ===
Brian Chen Chunsheng
- 陳俊成 or 陳春生
- Occupation: Businessman

Some media reports identified the person who approached Zhao as Melbourne businessperson Brian Chen Chunsheng.

The Age reported that Chen was flagged as a suspected senior Chinese intelligence operative by various Western security sources, and that Chen has posed for pictures in People's Liberation Army military uniforms, in addition to posing as a journalist during certain international political summits.

Chen was known to have made political donations to Australia's two major political parties, and his company was known to be promoting China's Belt and Road Initiative, leading to accusations he was using the Belt and Road Initiative as a cover to conduct intelligence operations.

Chen himself denied the allegations, claiming photos of him donning Chinese military uniforms were merely him borrowing a friend's military uniform to show off, and that he was given journalist accreditation by a media outlet owner so he could attend international political summits. Chen has also denied knowing Zhao, in addition to denying reports that he is involved in Chinese intelligence activities.

There is no suggestion of Chen having any knowledge or involvement in Zhao's death. Chen has reportedly not returned to Australia since leaving the country in March 2019.

== Aftermath ==
In the 2019 Federal election, Gladys Liu was elected as a Liberal Party MP for the Division of Chisholm, beating out a Labor Party candidate of Taiwanese heritage in a surprise but very narrow victory. See Electoral results for the Division of Chisholm.

Even prior to details of the infiltration plot being made public, Liu was accused of being a member of the China Overseas Exchange Association, which belonged to the State Council of the People's Republic of China at the time of her membership. In addition, Liu has been accused of being an honorary chair of overseas Chinese trade and commerce bodies that are believed to be linked to the Chinese Communist Party's United Front Work Department. Reports on this incident has brought renewed attention to allegations against Liu, especially since at least two photos show Liu and Zhao at a meeting that was held in Liu's former home during Australia Day in 2016.

Liu said she has "no recollection" of having met Zhao despite pictures of her and Zhao sitting next to each other on Lui's couch in her home, and at a restaurant. There are no suggestions that Liu was involved in the infiltration plot.

In September 2019, it was reported that members of Liu's Liberal Party branch had called to relax foreign investment laws related to China at the 2017 Victorian Liberal Party Conference.

== Reactions ==
=== Australia ===
ASIO's Director-General, Mike Burgess, refused to comment on the matter in depth due to "long-standing practice", but did say the agency was previously aware of the incident, and there is an active investigation underway.

Prime Minister Scott Morrison described the allegations as "deeply disturbing and troubling".

=== People's Republic of China ===
Ministry of Foreign Affairs spokesperson Geng Shuang have decried the accusations as "nothing but lies", and accused Australia of "a state of hysteria and extreme nervousness".

== Potential impact ==
It was noted that Zhao's legal and financial troubles would have made it almost impossible for him to be selected by the Liberals as a candidate, let alone win the election.

Monash University lecturer Sow Keat Tok said while the repercussions would have been huge if the allegations are true and Zhao was elected, it would still have taken Zhao years, if not decades, to get into the inner circle of the Australian decision-makers.

Australian Strategic Policy Institute analyst Alex Joske said it may be possible that any approach made on behalf of the Chinese Communist Party was not to target a particular election, but as part of a long-term strategy.

== See also ==
- Australia–China relations
- Foreign electoral intervention
- Entryism
- Dio Wang
- Sam Dastyari
- Wang Liquang
