= Electoral results for the district of Mooroolbark =

Victoria, Australia, district election results

This is a list of electoral results for the Electoral district of Mooroolbark in Victorian state elections.

== Members for Mooroolbark ==
Member	Party	Term
Lorraine Elliott	Liberal Party	1992–2002

== Election results ==
=== Elections in the 1990s ===
1999 Victorian state election: Mooroolbark
Party	Candidate	Votes	%	±%
Liberal	Lorraine Elliott	19,509	60.9	0.0
Labor	Darren McCrorey	12,549	39.1	+2.7
Total formal votes		32,058	97.3	−0.6
Informal votes		896	2.7	+0.6
Turnout		32,954	94.6	−0.3
Liberal hold		Swing	−1.3	

1996 Victorian state election: Mooroolbark
Party	Candidate	Votes	%	±%
Liberal	Lorraine Elliott	18,476	60.9	+5.6
Labor	Dale Burnham	11,074	36.5	+2.6
Natural Law	Robert Kendi	805	2.7	−0.8
Total formal votes		30,355	97.9	+1.2
Informal votes		657	2.1	−1.2
Turnout		31,012	94.9	
Two-party-preferred result
Liberal	Lorraine Elliott	18,879	62.2	+2.1
Labor	Dale Burnham	11,456	37.8	−2.1
Liberal hold		Swing	+2.1	

1992 Victorian state election: Mooroolbark
Party	Candidate	Votes	%	±%
Liberal	Lorraine Elliott	16,114	55.3	+11.1
Labor	Mike Welsh	9,880	33.9	−13.4
Independent	George Moran	1,422	4.9	+4.9
Natural Law	Robert Kendi	994	3.4	+3.4
Independent	Steve Raskovy	741	2.5	+2.5
Total formal votes		29,151	96.7	−0.3
Informal votes		987	3.3	+0.3
Turnout		30,138	98.0	
Two-party-preferred result
Liberal	Lorraine Elliott	17,469	60.1	+12.0
Labor	Mike Welsh	11,596	39.9	−12.0
Liberal gain from Labor		Swing	+12.0	
