= Willy Wang =

Willy Wang may refer to:

- Wang Liqiang, Chinese defector to Australia and self-proclaimed former spy
- Willy Wang (wushu), wushu taolu athlete from the Philippines
- William Wang, Taiwanese American billionaire entrepreneur
