= Ashley Goldsworthy =

Australian computer scientist and business executive

President of the Liberal Party of Australia
- In office 23 October 1990 – 28 August 1993
- Leader: John Hewson
- Preceded by: John Elliott
- Succeeded by: Tony Staley

Personal details
- Born: Ashley William Goldsworthy; 22 November 1935 (age 90) Culcairn, New South Wales, Australia
- Occupation: academic, computer scientist, business executive

Ashley William Goldsworthy AO, OBE (born 2 November 1935) is an Australian computer scientist and business executive. He was federal president of the Liberal Party of Australia from 1990 to 1993. He is deputy chair of the Brisbane Catholic Education Council.

== Career ==
Goldsworthy has degrees in accounting, business, science, public administration, theology, and canon law.

As chairman of the Education & Training Committee of the Business Council of Australia, Goldsworthy assisted in establishing the Business/Higher Education Round Table, which was launched by the Governor-General in 1990. He was B-HERT director 1990-95 and again beginning in 2008; president from 1995–97; and executive director from 1997–2008.

Former roles held by Goldsworthy:

- Dean of the School of Business and professor of leadership at Bond University.
- Federal president and Life Member of the Liberal Party
- Member of Federal Government's Industry Research & Development Board; Australian-American Fulbright Commission; Australian Science and Technology Council; Australian Payments System Council; National Library; and Australian Law Reform Commission;
- Chairman of the Centre for International Research on ICT at RMIT University
- President and CEO of the Australian Computer Society
- World president of the International Federation for Information Processing, and in 1999 achieved the rare honour of being elected an honorary member of that body.
- Prior to his business career he was director of economic statistics for the Australian Government.

== Recognition ==
He was awarded

- Officer of the Order of the British Empire (OBE) in the 1982 Birthday Honours
- Officer of the Order of Australia (AO) in 1991
- Centenary Medal in 2003
- Knight of Malta (KM) in 2009
- In 1996 the People's Republic of China honoured him by electing him a Fellow of the Chinese Institute of Electronics.
- He was inducted into the Pearcey Hall of Fame

Party political offices
Preceded by John Elliott	Federal President of the Liberal Party of Australia; 1990–1993	Succeeded by Tony Staley
