= John Valder =

Australian politician

John Valder (21 September 1931 – 9 May 2017) was an Australian politician who was president of the federal Liberal Party of Australia and chairman of the Australian Securities Exchange. He served as deputy chairman of the State Bank of New South Wales.

Valder was a founding member of the 'Not happy, John!' campaign.

Political offices
Preceded by Dr Jim Forbes	President of the Liberal Party; 16 July 1985 – 30 October 1987	Succeeded by John Elliott
