= John Elliott (businessman) =

Australian businessman (1941–2021)

President of the Liberal Party of Australia
- In office 30 October 1987 – 23 October 1990
- Leader: John Howard; Andrew Peacock; John Hewson
- Preceded by: John Valder
- Succeeded by: Ashley Goldsworthy

Personal details
- Born: John Dorman Elliott; 3 October 1941 Melbourne, Victoria, Australia
- Died: 23 September 2021 (aged 79) Richmond, Victoria, Australia
- Party: Liberal
- Spouse: Lorraine Elliott (divorced)
- Children: 3 (including Tom Elliott)
- Education: Carey Baptist Grammar School
- Alma mater: University of Melbourne

John Dorman Elliott (3 October 1941 – 23 September 2021) was an Australian businessman and state and federal president of the Liberal Party. He had also been president of the Carlton Football Club. He frequently provoked controversy due to his political affiliations, his brushes with the law, and his abrasive personal style.

== Early life and education ==
Elliott was born in Melbourne on 3 October 1941. He was the son of Frank Elliott and his wife, Anita. He completed his secondary schooling at Carey Baptist Grammar School in Kew. He then attended the University of Melbourne and graduated with a Bachelor of Commerce (Hons) degree and later completed a Master of Business Administration degree at the Melbourne Business School.

== Career ==
Elliott joined BHP for two years. He then left to do an MBA, before joining global consulting firm McKinsey & Company in 1966 and worked in both Australia and the United States for six years. In 1972, he acquired control of IXL, a food manufacturer listed on the Australian Securities Exchange. From there, he and his team built the company up through a string of acquisitions throughout the late 1970s and 1980s, including Australian corporate icons Elders Limited (an agricultural services concern) and Carlton & United Breweries (now part of the Foster's Group). The acquisition of Courage Breweries in the United Kingdom, followed by Carling O'Keefe Breweries in Canada- and UK-based Grand Metropolitan Breweries, made the Foster's Group the fourth-largest brewer in the world. During this time, he was also a high-profile president of the Carlton Football Club (1983–2002) and federal president of the Liberal Party. He was an effective advocate for the club on a range of issues. During his presidency, the club won two VFL (now AFL) premierships.

In 1985, Elliott's company, by then called Elders IXL, played an important role as a white knight in fending off Robert Holmes à Court's attempted takeover of diversified mining company BHP. Elders bought a large share in BHP, which blocked Holmes à Court's attempt to take control. As a result, Elliott joined the BHP board. He then attempted a management buyout of Elders, but this was unsuccessful and left his A$80 million fortune considerably reduced. Subsequently, the National Crime Authority of Australia (NCA) investigated a foreign exchange transaction undertaken by Elders. Elliott was cleared of criminal charges. He accused the NCA of a vendetta inspired by the then-Labor government, motivated by his position as Liberal Party president. He later launched civil action for damages, which was ultimately unsuccessful.

He was also a director of a number of public companies, including BHP, National Mutual, Bridge Oil and North Limited. Elliott was a member of the Liberal Party for over thirty years. He held multiple positions in the party, including president (1987–1990), party treasurer and vice president of the Victorian division. He was chairman of the 500 Club, which he formed in the 1980s, and was the biggest donor to the Liberal Party in Victoria.

His various political involvements led to him being caricatured in Rubbery Figures, a satirical rubber puppet series that screened in Australia during the late 1980s. He was often depicted holding an Elders IXL beer can while belching or exclaiming "pig's arse".

In 1990, Elliott was a vocal supporter of the Multifunction Polis (MFP), a controversial concept to build in Australia a new "technology city" with a population of 100,000. At the time, the leader of the Liberal Party, Andrew Peacock, was vehemently opposed to the plan, claiming the Multifunction Polis would become an "Asian enclave".

== Sports administration career ==
=== Carlton Football Club President ===
Elliott became the president of the Carlton Football Club in 1983, when he replaced Ian Rice. During Elliott's tenure as president of the Club, he oversaw a significant period of on and off field success for the club. Elliott also oversaw Carlton's two premiership victories in 1987 and 1995.

After the 2002 AFL season, Elliott was voted out of office as president of the Carlton Football Club, a position he had held for two decades. The club, after having finished last for the first time since 1894, was later found to have committed serious long-term breaches of the Australian Football League salary cap regulations, which resulted in a fine of $930,000, forfeited draft picks (including the prized number-one draft pick), and an ongoing prolonged period of poor results on the field. Further, in a move some thought to be ungracious given his long service to the club, his name was also removed from all signage at Carlton's home ground at Princes Park. Elliott was then replaced by Ian Collins as President of Carlton Football Club.

== Later life ==
In January 2005, he declared himself bankrupt, to be discharged in July 2008. When he died in 2021 his net worth was less than $12,000.

On television, Elliott was a regular guest panelist on the ABC television program Q&A. In 2010, he appeared on the televised Dick Smith population debate, where his vision to harness Northern Australia's excess rainfall via pipeline to the Murray–Darling headwaters in Queensland received wide support. In 2012, he featured on the ABC's Agony Uncles program. On radio, he regularly appeared on a program presented by his son Tom on talkback station 3AW.

Elliott was the inaugural chairman of the Committee for Melbourne and a director of the foundation of the University of Melbourne Business School. In September 2015, he was made an honorary fellow of the school.

== Personal life ==
He was divorced from the late Lorraine Elliott, a former Victorian state parliamentarian for the Liberal Party. They had three children. The eldest is Tom Elliott (born 1967), an investment banker and radio and television presenter. His daughter Caroline Elliott was vice-president of the Liberal Party in Victoria. He also had two children from his second marriage, which also ended in divorce. His second wife, Amanda Elliott, later became the first female chairperson in the Victorian Racing Club's 153-year history.

Known for his "eccentric, crass and often controversial style of business and politics", Elliott was also a long-term cigarette smoker and claimed to have considered running for the 2016 Australian Senate on a platform of "Smokers' Rights".

Elliott was admitted to the Epworth Hospital in Richmond, Victoria, after suffering a fall in September 2021. He died on 23 September 2021, ten days before his 80th birthday.

Sporting positions
Preceded by Ian Rice	Carlton Football Club president 1983–2002	Succeeded by Ian Collins
Party political offices
Preceded by John Valder	President of the Liberal Party of Australia; 1987–1990	Succeeded by Ashley Goldsworthy
