= Tom Elliott (radio personality) =

Australian investment banker and radio host

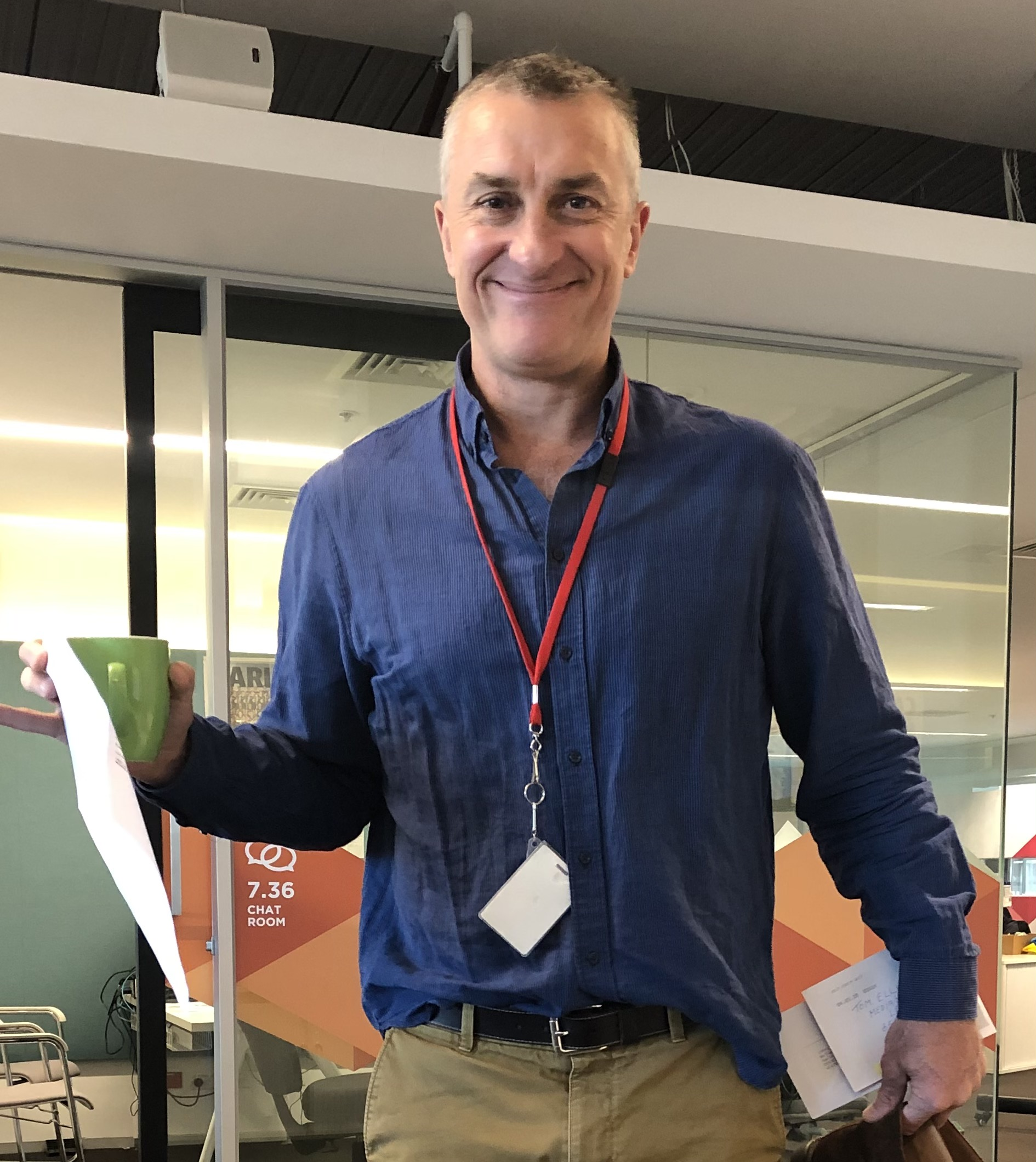
- Born: 22 November 1967 (age 58)
- Education: Carey Baptist Grammar School; University of Melbourne (BComm)
- Occupation: Radio presenter
- Known for: 3AW Mornings & Drive
- Parents: John Elliott (father); Lorraine Elliott (mother)

Tom Elliott (born 22 November 1967) is an Australian radio and television personality, who is also known for his work in the finance sector.

Elliott is best known for his radio work at Melbourne radio station 3AW where he is host of 3AW's Mornings program. Previously he was host of the 3AW Drive program for a decade from 2013 until 2023.

== Career ==
Elliott was born on 22 November 1967, the eldest of the three children of prominent businessman and future Liberal Party treasurer John Elliott and his wife Lorraine Elliott, a future Victorian state Liberal parliamentarian. His parents later divorced. He was educated at Carey Baptist Grammar School, Kew from 1973 to 1985, and the University of Melbourne from 1986 to 1988, where he graduated with a Bachelor of Commerce degree. He then worked in the banking industry in Toronto and New York City.

He was employed on the personal staff of Liberal politician Michael Wooldridge in 1990. From 1990 to 1992 he studied at the University of Oxford, gaining a Bachelor of Arts in Philosophy, Politics and Economics. On return to Australia he worked for the clothing retailer Country Road until 1996. In the meantime he had started presenting a regular finance report on radio 3RRR.

From 1997 to 2001, he was Executive Director of the investment bank Flinders Capital. From 2001 he has been Managing Director of MM&E Capital. He has also been a Director of Beulah Capital since 2011.

Later media work included financial reports on radio 3AW, filling in for talk-back presenters Neil Mitchell and Derryn Hinch, and television appearances on Network 10's The Project, and Seven Network's Sunrise program. Elliott also filed editorial pieces for the Herald Sun for four years. In January 2013, Elliott replaced Derryn Hinch as presenter of the Drive program on 3AW.

In 2014, Elliott was criticised for twice being fooled into thinking he was interviewing people who were later discovered not to be who they claimed to be. In the first instance, Elliott interviewed a person claiming to be Islamic State military commander Abu Omar al-Shishani but who was later discovered to be a Kurd living in Scandinavia. In the second incident, Elliott interviewed a person claiming to be Australian rapper 360 but it was later discovered to be another rapper known as BK Ultra.

In September 2023, 3AW announced that Elliott will replace Neil Mitchell as presenter of Mornings from January 2024. Jacqui Felgate was announced to replace Elliott on Drive.

== Personal life ==
Elliott is married to TV presenter and journalist Elise Elliott (née Mooney). They have a daughter, Ava.

Similarly to his father, who was club president for almost twenty years, he is a fervent supporter of the Carlton Football Club.
