= Carina Garland =

Australian politician

Carina Garland MP
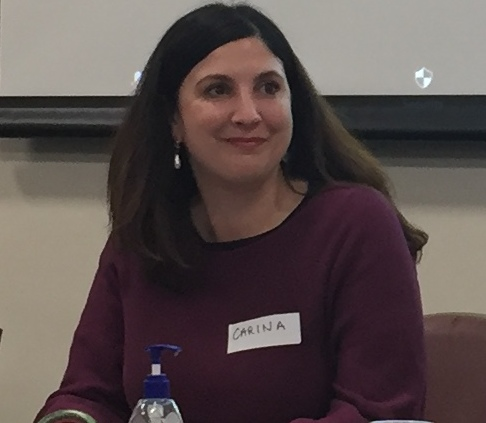
- Garland at a 2022 election forum

Member of the Australian Parliament for Chisholm
- Incumbent
- Assumed office 21 May 2022
- Preceded by: Gladys Liu

Personal details
- Born: 1982 (age 43–44) Traralgon, Victoria
- Party: Labor

Carina Mary Lindsay Garland (born 1982) is an Australian politician. She has served as a Labor MP for Chisholm since the 2022 Australian federal election.

== Early life and education ==
Garland was born in Traralgon, Victoria. Her father was a general practitioner and ran a practice in Melbourne's south-east with her mother, a nurse. Her maternal grandparents immigrated to Australia from Italy in the 1950s. Her grandfather was a maths teacher at Emmaus College in Burwood.

Garland grew up in Clayton. As a child, she performed ballet concerts at the Alexander Theatre in Clayton. She attended Sacré Cœur School in Glen Iris, where she was a School Prefect. She later enrolled in an Arts/Law degree at Monash University, being awarded first class honours in English Literature. She received a scholarship to complete a PhD in the humanities at the University of Sydney.

In her early life she experienced insecure work, which she has described as "the dominant form of employment" that she has experienced. She said that this experience influenced her advocacy for secure, local jobs and her belief "that people should have jobs they can count on".

== Career ==
Garland worked as an academic at the University of Sydney. After completing her PhD in the humanities, Garland worked as a parliamentary staffer for Simon Crean. "Simon was the first person I voted for in any election and my first boss in politics," she said in 2023. She described him as a "generous boss" who gave her support and advice during her election campaign in 2022.

From 2016 to 2018, Garland was Senior Vice-President of the Australian Labor Party (Vic).

Garland served as the Assistant Secretary for the Victorian Trades Hall Council from 2018 - 2021. Her responsibilities included the Young Workers Centre and the Migrant Workers Centre. In 2019 she was a witness in the Victorian Government's Legislative Assembly Economy and Infrastructure Committee Inquiry into sustainable employment for disadvantaged jobseekers, where she advocated for marginalised and migrant workers.

== Political career ==
Garland was preselected to stand in Chisholm for Labor at the 2022 federal election in July 2021, and won the seat with an 8.1-point swing in her direction, defeating Liberal incumbent Gladys Liu. During the 2022 election campaign, Garland and her supporters knocked on 60,000 doors in Chisholm, phoned 72,000 people and had more than 25,000 conversations with voters in the electorate. Garland was endorsed by Kevin Rudd. Anthony Albanese described her as "a local champion who understands Chisholm and its needs".

In the Labor caucus, Garland is a member of the Labor Left faction.

Former Chisholm MP, Anna Burke, is a friend and mentor to Garland, and Garland has said that Burke showed her "what it means to be a really hard-working, active local member of parliament."

In Parliament, Garland advocates for education, healthcare, climate change, workers rights, small business, local manufacturing, the arts and multiculturalism. In April 2023 she signed a letter calling for a substantial increase to JobSeeker. In May 2024 she spoke out about the Federal Government's Future Of Gas Strategy, stating that she believes "the future is renewables" and that she will "always fight for strong, real climate action".

Garland is an advocate for life long learning and building a thriving higher education system in Australia. In September 2023 she made a submission the Australian Universities Accord Interim Report on behalf of the Chisholm electorate. Her submission was based on a survey of the electorate. In her submission, she advocated for financial support for unpaid work placements, improving safety on campus, and reforming the Higher Education Loan Program (HELP) (formerly HECS). On 21 March 2024, Minister for Education the Hon. Jason Clare MP acknowledged Garland's work to raise the issue of HELP debt reform during Question Time.

Garland has publicly supported the importance of early childhood education and care. In February 2024 Garland made a submission to the Productivity Commission's review into early childhood education and care. Her submission was based on a survey of her electorate and a public webinar held with Minister for Early Childhood Education and Care Anne Aly MP. In her submission, she advocated for "wages for early childhood educators (that) reflect the importance of their work" and more affordable child care for families.

Garland is an advocate for action to address gendered violence, and has spoken out about the issue of safety on campus. She has said that she has "witnessed first-hand the devastation that sexual violence on campus has wrought on people's lives", and that she does not want "any other generations of women to have to go through that." On 28 February 2024, Minister for Education the Hon. Jason Clare MP thanked Garland during Question Time for her work advocating for action to address gendered violence on campus.

Garland supports access to affordable, accessible healthcare for all Australians. She has delivered a bulk billing Medicare Urgent Care Clinic in Mount Waverley. Garland is also an advocate for mental health support, delivering a headspace centre for Box Hill and securing funding for the headspace centre in Syndal.

Garland's electorate office is in Mount Waverley.

== Personal life ==
Garland lives in Clayton. She is a member of the United Workers Union, the Australian Services Union, and the Community and Public Sector Union.

Garland is a descendant of Mary and Edith Garland, who were suffragists in Victoria who signed the 1891 petition to grant Victorian women the right to vote.

Garland has Italian heritage, and her family credits the Federal Labor Government for transforming their lives.

She is a member of the Collingwood Football Club.

Parliament of Australia
Preceded by Gladys Liu	Member for Chisholm; 2022–present	Incumbent
