= Helen Mayer =

Australian politician

Member of the Australian Parliament for Chisholm
- In office 5 March 1983 – 11 July 1987
- Preceded by: Graham Harris
- Succeeded by: Michael Wooldridge

Personal details
- Born: 7 September 1932 Kaniva, Victoria
- Died: 7 February 2008 (aged 75)
- Party: Australian Labor Party
- Occupation: Teacher

Dorothy Helen Mayer (7 September 1932 – 7 February 2008) was an Australian politician. Born in Kaniva, Victoria, she was educated at Swinburne Institute of Technology in Melbourne, and then Toorak Teachers' College, after which she became a teacher.

In 1983, she was elected to the Australian House of Representatives as the Labor member for Chisholm, defeating Liberal MP Graham Harris. It was her third try for the seat, having previously stood in 1977 and 1980. On the second occasion, she slashed the Liberal majority from a fairly safe eight percent to a very marginal two percent. She held the seat until her defeat in 1987. Mayer died in 2008.

Parliament of Australia
Preceded by Graham Harris	Member for Chisholm; 1983–1987	Succeeded by Michael Wooldridge
