= Graham Harris =

Australian politician (1937–2025)

Member of the Australian Parliament for Chisholm
- In office 18 October 1980 – 5 March 1983
- Preceded by: Tony Staley
- Succeeded by: Helen Mayer

Personal details
- Born: 29 August 1937 Melbourne, Australia
- Died: August 8, 2025 (aged 87)
- Party: Liberal Party of Australia
- Education: University of Melbourne
- Profession: Barrister

Graham McDonald Harris (29 August 1937 – 4 August 2025) was an Australian politician. He was a Liberal Party of Australia member of the Australian House of Representatives from 1980 to 1983, representing the electorate of Chisholm.

Harris was born in Melbourne and studied law at the University of Melbourne, before practising as a barrister from 1961 until his election to parliament. He was a member of the Royal Australian Naval Reserve from 1965 and was promoted to Lieutenant Commander in 1974. Harris was an active member of the Liberal Party for many years, serving on its state council from 1970 to 1981 and as chairman of his state and federal electorate committees.

In 1980, he was elected to the House of Representatives at the 1980 election upon the retirement of Tony Staley. He held the seat until his defeat in 1983 by Labor's Helen Mayer. Harris opposed the controversial Franklin Dam in Tasmania, which was highly unpopular in his electorate, and attributed anti-dam campaigning targeting the government by The Wilderness Society as a factor in his defeat. Harris recontested the seat against Mayer at the 1984 election, losing by only 200 votes in a closely-fought race in which Harris campaigned on opposition to the Hawke government's assets test for taxation.

Harris returned to legal practice after his defeat in 1983 and remained a practising barrister until 1994, after which he engaged in other business interests. He was awarded the Reserve Force Decoration in 1985, was promoted by the Navy Reserve to the rank of Commander in 1985 and served as Director Naval Intelligence (Reserves) in the RANR from 1989 to 1993. He was later state president (1992-1994) and national president (1994-2017) of the Navy League. Harris was a Director of Kilmour Investments Pty Ltd from 1973 to 2022 (Chairman 1979 to 2017) Harris has been a Director of Associated Kiln Driers Pty Ltd (AKD) since 1991 and Chairman since 2015. Harris retired as Chairman in June 2023. He remains a Director. AKD is Australia's largest timber miller.

Harris died on August 8, 2025, at the age of 87.

Parliament of Australia
Preceded by Tony Staley	Member for Chisholm; 1980–1983	Succeeded by Helen Mayer
