= Tony Staley =

Australian politician and businessman (1939–2023)

The Honourable Tony Staley AO
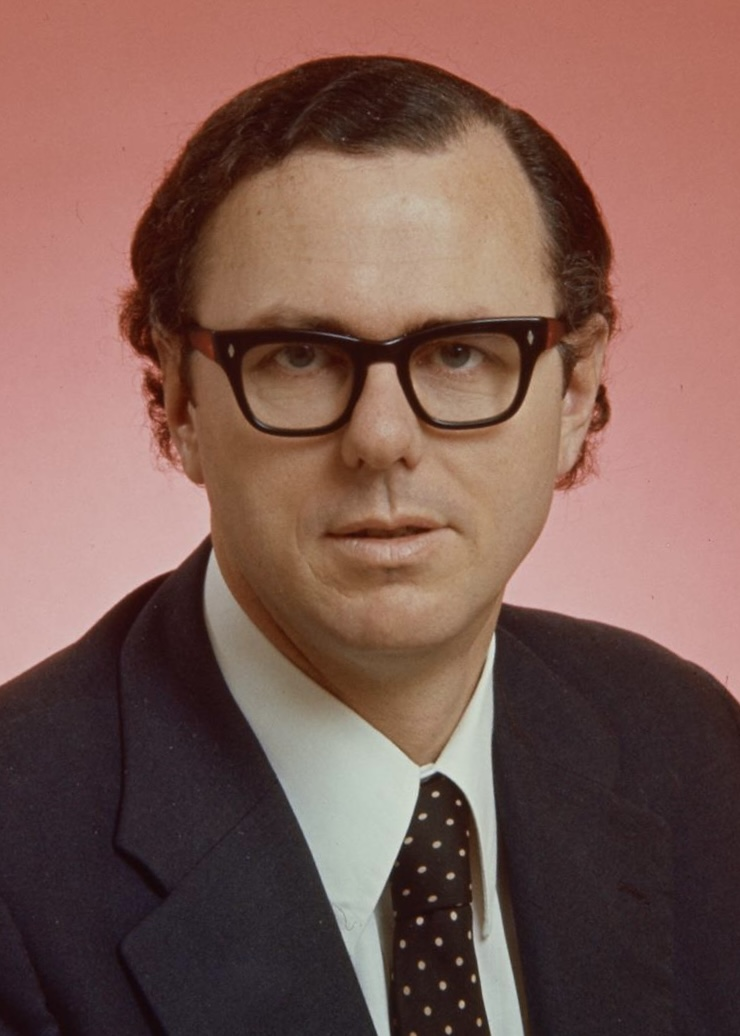
- Staley in 1974

President of the Liberal Party of Australia
- In office 28 August 1993 – 1 July 1999
- Leader: John Howard
- Preceded by: Ashley Goldsworthy
- Succeeded by: Shane Stone

Member of the Australian Parliament for Chisholm
- In office 19 September 1970 – 19 September 1980
- Preceded by: Wilfrid Kent Hughes
- Succeeded by: Graham Harris

Personal details
- Born: 15 May 1939 Horsham, Victoria, Australia
- Died: 3 May 2023 (aged 83) Melbourne, Australia
- Party: Liberal
- Education: University of Melbourne

Anthony Allan Staley AO (15 May 1939 – 3 May 2023) was an Australian politician. A member of the Liberal Party, he held the Victorian seat of Chisholm from 1970 to 1980 and served as Minister for the Capital Territory (1976–1977) and Minister for Posts and Telecommunications (1977–1980) in the Fraser government. He later served as national president of the Liberal Party from 1993 to 1999.

== Early life ==
Staley was born on 15 May 1939 in Horsham, Victoria. He was educated at Scotch College, Melbourne. He completed the degree of Bachelor of Laws at the University of Melbourne.

== Parliament ==
Staley was elected to parliament at the 1970 Chisholm by-election, which followed the death of the incumbent Liberal MP Wilfrid Kent Hughes. He was the Member for Chisholm from 1970 to 1980 and was Minister for the Capital Territory from February 1976 to December 1977 in the Fraser Government and then Minister for Post and Telecommunications until his retirement from Parliament.

== Subsequent activities ==
He later served as Federal President of the Liberal Party of Australia. In May 1994 when Liberal Leader John Hewson called a leadership spill, Staley as Liberal President caused controversy when he withdrew his support for Hewson saying they could not win with Hewson sadly. The controversy was due to the expectation that the organizational wing of the party which Staley was in charge of as president did not interfere with the parliamentary party in selecting the leader. In the subsequent leadership spill, Hewson was defeated by Alexander Downer but it was expected that Staley would not have survived as party president if Hewson had won the spill. He did continue on in the position and supported John Howard's bid to become Leader of the Opposition and ultimately Prime Minister.

== Personal life and death ==
In 1990, Staley was involved in a serious road accident, which left him needing to use calipers to walk.

Staley died in Melbourne on 3 May 2023, at the age of 83.

Political offices
| Preceded by Eric Robinson | Minister for the Capital Territory; 1976–1977 | Succeeded by Robert Ellicott |
| Preceded by Eric Robinson | Minister for Post and Telecommunications; 1977–1980 | Succeeded by Ian Sinclair |
Parliament of Australia
| Preceded by Wilfrid Kent Hughes | Member for Chisholm; 1970–1980 | Succeeded by Graham Harris |
Party political offices
| Preceded by Ashley Goldsworthy | President of the Liberal Party of Australia; 1993–1999 | Succeeded by Shane Stone |
