= Wang Liqiang =

Convicted Chinese fraudster and self-claimed Chinese spy

- Traditional Chinese: 王立強
- Simplified Chinese: 王立强
Transcriptions
Standard Mandarin
- Hanyu Pinyin: Wáng Lìqiáng
Yue: Cantonese
- Jyutping: Wong^{4} Lap^{6} Koeng^{4}

Wang Liqiang (Chinese: 王立强), or William Wang, is a self-proclaimed former spy for China and convicted fraudster. In November 2019, Wang sought political asylum in Australia, claiming to be a spy who was involved in the People's Republic of China's intervention in the affairs of Hong Kong SAR and Taiwan. The factual accuracy of his claims has been disputed, with several experts expressing skepticism about his claims, citing inconsistencies in his account. The Chinese government has rejected Wang's allegations as "absurd" and identified him as a "fraud", citing a prior fraud conviction and alleged he fled China using a forged passport while facing further fraud charges.

Wang's case drew worldwide attention, leading to an investigation in Taiwan. In November 2021, the years-long investigation concluded with no evidence to support Wang's claims, and individuals that he had accused of being accomplices or handlers were cleared of all national security charges.

In January 2023, an Australian tribunal rejected Wang's asylum application, finding that he had committed "serious fraud against an Australian citizen". The tribunal also stated that there was no evidence corroborating his espionage allegations, and expressed strong doubts about his claims, citing his history of fraudulent conduct. The Department of Home Affairs upheld the denial and Wang faces possible deportation to China, where he is also subject to separate fraud charges.

== Investigation ==
Shanghai police stated that Wang is a convicted fraudster and presented court records and video evidence of his 2016 fraud conviction in Fujian, which included a suspended 15-month sentence for deceptive financial schemes. They accused Wang on fleeing mainland China for Hong Kong using a forged Hong Kong permanent residency card and fraudulent Chinese passport, amid new fraud charges against him. ASPI's strategic analyst Alex Joske who participated in 60 Minutes's investigation of Wang, reported that Wang claimed he obtained a police check that did not show such convictions when he applied for an Australian visa.

Wang had claimed that Chinese intelligence operations in Australia sought to gain influence within the Liberal Party ahead of the May 2019 federal election. He alleged he personally knew of a plot to recruit Bo "Nick" Zhao, a Melbourne luxury car dealer and aspiring Liberal candidate, to run in the Chisholm electorate with the Chinese authorities intending to use him as a parliamentary asset for Beijing. Zhao had previously been reported dead in a Melbourne motel room on March 5, 2019. Wang speculated that Zhao's death was "suspicious". Wang also had alleged that the Hong Kong-based China Innovation Group Limited (CIIL) had facilitated bribery and funding to influence Australian election outcomes, and that CIIL and associated entities had also pursued theft of Australian military technology through making strategic investments in local firms and exploitation of industry partnerships. In 2019, the Australian Security Intelligence Organisation (ASIO) began investigating Wang's allegations in regards to the named Australian associates and operations Wang described but later reports stated that the ASIO investigation yielded no evidence corroborating Wang's claims of coordinated infiltration or bribery.

Wang claims that he was involved in the PRC government's operation to support pro-Beijing media outlets in Taiwan and candidates in the 2018 Taiwanese local elections, with the ultimate goal to prevent incumbent ROC President Tsai Ing-wen's re-election in 2020. Wang also claimed to be involved in the abductions of the Causeway Bay Books booksellers in Hong Kong, although Lam Wing-kee, one of the abductees, does not recall meeting him and has reservations about his claims. Lam Wing Kee told Hong Kong media that Wang was likely just repeating details of the abduction that he had “heard elsewhere,” dismissing his claim to have played any central role in the operation.

Leonid Petrov, a Korean security expert at the Australian National University, also said Wang's counterfeit South Korean passport contained serious discrepancies. Petrov points out that 'Wang' is a very common Chinese name but a very rare name in Korea. Additionally Petrov points out an obvious error that the Korean name on the passport in the lower right area doesn't match the English name listed. Lastly he pointed out that Wang does not speak Korean, hence the issuance and use of this fake passport for anything other than just “flash” purposes was unprofessional for intelligence operations as carrying a passport in a language one does not speak is extremely risky.

Sky News host Sharri Markson reported in the Daily Telegraph that Wang may have only been engaged in low-level work for China. The Daily Telegraph had also reported that Australian intelligence officials had briefed the Australian Prime Minister Scott Morrison on a report witheringly titled “China Spy Farce”, with the consensus that it is “highly dubious” that Wang Liqiang was the high-level Chinese spy that he claims to be, and that while "at best" Wang may have been involved in “very low-level” work, he did not operate in Australia and would “not have value” to the country.

Wang also claimed that he worked with the Hong Kong-based company China Innovation Investment Limited to infiltrate Hong Kong universities and media with pro-Chinese Communist Party operatives. On 26 November, Taiwanese authorities detained and questioned Chinese businessman Xiang Xin (向心, also Xiang Nianxin 向念心) and his wife Gong Qing (龔青), executives of China Innovation whom Wang identified as Chinese intelligence operatives. The two denied knowing Wang. The two were accused of running a spy network directed by high-level members of the People's Liberation Army, Nie Li and Ding Henggao.

On 8 April 2021, Xiang and Gong were charged with illegally laundering around US$24 million from Shanghai-based Guotai Investment Holding Group (國太投資), with an investigation regarding whether the two violated the National Security Act ongoing. The prosecutors alleged that Xiang held positions at various Chinese state corporations related to the military, while Gong worked as an art editor for a military affairs magazine.

However, on 12 November 2021, Taiwan's Taipei Prosecutors Office said it has dropped all national security related charges against Xiang Xin and five other alleged associates citing "a lack of evidence". The prosecutors said they could not find any evidence to back Wang Liqiang's assertions that the businesses invested by Xiang Xin ever engaged in election interference or information operations in Taiwan. There was also little evidence to support Wang's assertion that Xiang Xin ran a spy network supported by China, as Wang asserted in 2019.

== Reactions ==
=== Australia ===
Australian Prime Minister Scott Morrison described allegations of a Chinese plot to infiltrate Australia's parliament as "deeply disturbing". "I would caution anyone leaping to any conclusions about these matters. And that's why we have these agencies." On 24 November 2019, the Australian Security Intelligence Organisation (ASIO) confirmed that Wang's allegations were being taken "seriously", but did not comment on the merits thereof.

Labor leader Anthony Albanese said the reports were "of real concern", and that Wang might have a "legitimate claim for asylum". Liberal member-of-parliament Andrew Hastie called Wang a "friend of democracy", and also called for the government to grant Wang's asylum application.

James Laurenceson, acting director of the Australia–China Relations Institute at the University of Technology Sydney criticised the Australian media for pushing the Wang story too hastily without having it verified first. He stated “It is a fact that Australian journalists, commentators and politicians more hawkish on China and more invested in the ‘China threat’ narrative were the ones breaking the Wang Liqiang story and talking it up. The Wang Liqiang story is just the latest example of claims running ahead of an evidence base in Australia.”

Speaking on national television, Australian Treasurer Josh Frydenberg declined to comment on ASIO's "operational matter," but said that the Australian government "makes no apologies for the laws that [it's] introduced around foreign interference and foreign influence."

=== Mainland China ===
Ma Xiaoguang, leader of the Taiwan Affairs Office of the Chinese State Council, said that "the mainland never involves itself in Taiwanese elections, and these reports are complete nonsense." He further stated that whoever "made up" this story intends to meddle with the Taiwanese election unjustly and that he believed "Taiwanese compatriots will see this right through."

The Jing'an Branch of the Shanghai Public Security Bureau issued an official statement that Wang was a fugitive in a fraud case and that both his Chinese passport and Hong Kong permanent resident identity card were forged. On 27 November, Chinese state-owned Global Times released an "exclusive" court video apparently showing Wang on trial for fraud, admitting all charges, and given a suspended sentence of 18 months. However, Radio Free Asia reported that some critics believed that the video is likely doctored, because it appeared "blurry" and mostly consisted of the defendant showing his back to the camera for most of the footage, and that the 2-minute and 34-second video was "heavily edited" in that it only showed the "confirmation of the defendant's basic information, the judge's verdict, and the defendant's final statement". In a separate editorial, Global Times argued that Australian intelligence didn't take Wang's claims seriously and suggested that if the Australian Security Intelligence Organisation (ASIO) had genuinely believed them, it would have conducted covert counter-espionage operations rather than allowing the media to "expose" the case.

=== Taiwan ===
Han Kuo-yu, the Kuomintang presidential candidate, rejected claims of electoral assistance from the CCP and said that if he had taken even a single dollar from them for the campaign, he would withdraw immediately. President Tsai responded that China obviously intends to interfere with Taiwanese elections.

Wong Yen-ching, former deputy director of Taiwan's Military Intelligence Bureau, stated that he suspected Wang of fraud and that based on his professional judgement, he can say with certainty that [Wang's allegations] were falsified in an attempt to seek political asylum.” According to him, Wang's claim that he worked in both Taiwan and Hong Kong, and that he reported to two supervisors at the same time contradicts the basic principles of espionage as spies assigned tasks in one location at a time, will not report to multiple supervisors simultaneously. In addition, Wong says that Wang referred to China’s intelligence bureau by a former name, appearing to have no knowledge that it was later renamed. Wong asserts "If Wang had valuable information to provide, the Australian government would protect the information by attempting to prevent him from giving interviews. As Canberra apparently does not trust him, Wang must have spoken to the media in an attempt to avoid being deported back to China".

== Tribunal ruling ==
In January 2023, Australia's Administrative Appeals Tribunal rejected Wang Liqiang's asylum application, and expressed "grave concerns" about Wang's overall credibility. It noted Wang's proven involvement in serious fraud - specifically defrauding a Sydney businessman of approximately A$480,000 through false investment schemes - and that there has been no evidence presented to corroborate Wang's allegations of espionage. Consequently, the Department of Home Affairs upheld the denial, and barred Wang from Australian permanent residency on character grounds under Section 501 of the Migration Act 1958, which prohibits visas for individuals that have been ruled to pose risks due to criminal conduct. Wang faces the risk of deportation to China where he is wanted on separate fraud charges.

== See also ==
- 2019 Australian Parliament infiltration plot
- Australia-China relations
- Cross-Strait relations
- Guo Wengui
