= Electoral district of Mooroolbark =

Former state electoral district of Victoria, Australia

Coordinates: 37.785°S 145.315°E

Mooroolbark Victoria—Legislative Assembly
- State: Victoria
- Created: 1992
- Abolished: 2002
- Namesake: Suburb of Mooroolbark
- Demographic: Metropolitan

The electoral district of Mooroolbark was an electoral district of the Legislative Assembly in the Australian state of Victoria.

The seat was abolished at the 2002 election, with the majority of the electorate being replaced by the new seat of Kilsyth.

== Members ==
| Member | Party | Term |
|---|---|---|
| Lorraine Elliott | Liberal | 1992–2002 |
