= Lorraine Elliott =

Australian politician (1943–2014)

Lorraine Elliott AM

Member of the Victorian Legislative Assembly for Mooroolbark
- In office 3 October 1992 – 29 November 2002

Personal details
- Born: Lorraine Clare Golder; 9 July 1943 Melbourne, Australia
- Died: 2 July 2014 (aged 70) Richmond, Victoria, Australia
- Party: Liberal
- Relations: Tom Elliott (son)

Lorraine Clare Elliott AM (née Golder; 9 July 1943 – 2 July 2014) was an Australian politician. She was the Liberal member for Mooroolbark in the Victorian Legislative Assembly from 1992 to 2002.

Elliott was born to Harry James Golder and Ailsa Lorraine Trengove in Melbourne, and was educated at Ashburton Primary School and Camberwell CEGGS, graduating in 1960. She received a Bachelor of Arts and Diploma of Education from the University of Melbourne in 1964, and would later receive a Bachelor of Education from Monash University in 1984.

From 1965–1967, she was a teacher at Blackburn High School, and became an Honorary Probation Officer with the State Correction Service in 1967, combining this with raising her three children by John Elliott (this marriage was later dissolved). Their eldest child is the investment banker and radio and television presenter Tom Elliott.

She joined the Liberal Party in 1972. In 1983 she became an English Literature teacher at Donvale Living and Learning Centre, and in 1986 became one of the Liberal Party's Federal Council Delegate, as well as Metropolitan Female Vice-President.

In 1992, Elliott won the new Victorian Legislative Assembly seat of Mooroolbark for the Liberal Party. She married John Kiely on 8 November 1996, but retained Elliott as her surname. In 1996 she became Parliamentary Secretary for the Arts, and following the Kennett Government's defeat in 1999 she became Shadow Minister for Community Services and the Arts. Her seat of Mooroolbark was abolished in 2002; she contested its replacement, Kilsyth, but was defeated by Labor candidate Dympna Beard.

Elliott died on 2 July 2014 in Richmond, Victoria from complications of breast cancer. She was one week short of her 71st birthday.

She was posthumously inducted onto the Victorian Honour Roll of Women in 2015.

Parliament of Victoria
New seat	Member for Mooroolbark; 1992–2002	District abolished
