= Gladys Liu =

Hong Kong-born Australian politician

Cr Gladys Liu
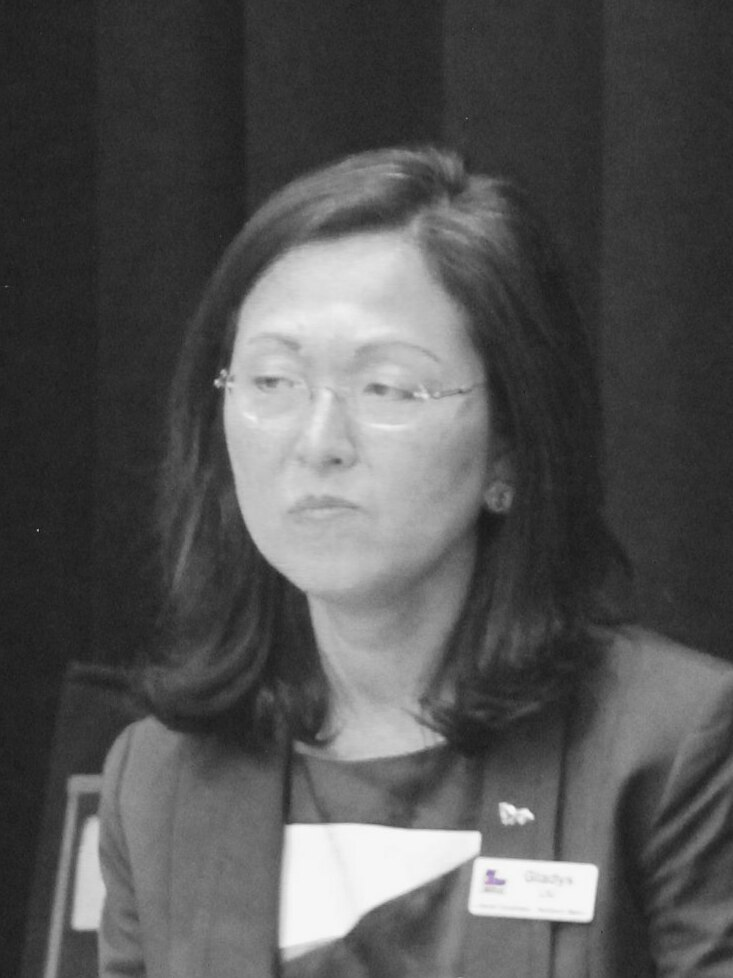
- Liu in 2014

Councillor of the City of Melbourne
- Incumbent
- Assumed office 26 October 2024

Member of the Australian Parliament for Chisholm
- In office 18 May 2019 – 21 May 2022
- Preceded by: Julia Banks
- Succeeded by: Carina Garland

Personal details
- Born: Liu Sim-ngor; 6 April 1964 (age 62) British Hong Kong
- Party: Liberal
- Education: Belilios Public School
- Alma mater: Hong Kong Polytechnic (HD); La Trobe University (BAS)

Gladys Liu
- Traditional Chinese: 廖嬋娥
- Simplified Chinese: 廖婵娥
Transcriptions
Standard Mandarin
- Hanyu Pinyin: Liào Chán'é
Yue: Cantonese
- Jyutping: Liu^{6} Sim^{4} Ngo^{4}

Gladys Liu (Yue Chinese: 廖嬋娥, pronounced [liːu̯ siːm ŋɔː]; born 6 April 1964) is a Hong Kong-born Australian politician who currently serves as a councillor of the City of Melbourne. She previously represented the Division of Chisholm in Victoria for the Liberal Party from her election in 2019 until her defeat in 2022. Liu was the first ethnically Chinese woman ever elected to the House, defeating the Labor Party's Jennifer Yang, before being defeated by Labor candidate Carina Garland at the 2022 federal election.

Between 2003 and 2015, Liu was a member of the Guangdong provincial chapter of the China Overseas Exchange Association, a bureau within the United Front Work Department of the Chinese Communist Party (CCP) responsible for influencing overseas and returning Chinese residents.

During her time in federal parliament, Liu had been the subject of media and intelligence investigations over her connections to entities and figures that had ties to the CCP.

== Early life and education ==
Growing up in Hong Kong with six siblings, Liu's family is of Chaozhou heritage. She studied at Belilios Public School, and attended Hong Kong Polytechnic. In 1985, Liu emigrated to Australia to study at La Trobe University. She studied speech pathology and is completely deaf in her left ear. After graduation, Liu worked for the Victorian Education Department for 14 years and owned a share of two restaurants in Box Hill and Richmond.

Liu became an Australian citizen in April 1992. Under Chinese nationality law where dual nationality is not recognised, she was still considered a Chinese national in Hong Kong after 1 July 1997 unless a change of nationality was declared. In 2018, she formally declared a change of nationality to the Hong Kong immigration department of her Australian citizenship to which they issued formal recognition in September 2018.

Liu was one of three MPs in the 46th Parliament of Australia who graduated from high schools outside of Australia, the others being Kristina Keneally and Mehreen Faruqi.

== Political career ==
Before entering Parliament, Liu was an adviser to former Victorian Premiers Ted Baillieu and Denis Napthine. She also ran as a Liberal Party candidate for the South Eastern Metropolitan Region of the Victorian Legislative Council at the 2010 Victorian state election and for the Northern Metropolitan Region of the Victorian Legislative Council at the 2014 Victorian state election.

After winning the division of Chisholm narrowly at the 2019 Australian federal election, Liu was defeated at the 2022 Australian federal election.

In 2024 Liu was elected as a member of Melbourne City Council.

=== Views ===
Liu is a member of the National Right faction of the Liberal Party, which is considered to be the party's conservative faction.

In July 2019, Liu backed anti-government protesters in her birthplace of Hong Kong, lauding their “passion and commitment to democracy”. She told The Australian she firmly endorsed the protest movement, and its aims. “As a proud Hong Kong-born Australian, my position has been clear,” Ms Liu said. “The significant number of people in Hong Kong who have taken to the streets to voice their concerns demonstrates to the world the kind of passion and commitment to democracy that the people of Hong Kong hold.”

In September 2019, it was reported that members of Liu's Liberal Party branch had called to relax foreign investment laws related to China at the 2017 Victorian Liberal Party Conference.

In May 2020, Liu penned an op-ed for The Age in which she supported the Coalition Government's call for an independent inquiry into the origins of the COVID-19 pandemic. She wrote: "We cannot let something like this happen again. The communist government of China, the World Health Organisation and governments around the world need to be accountable for the decisions made during this crisis." She also stressed that Chinese-Australians ought not to be the victims of scapegoating, and noted that the Chinese-Australian community had responded early and compassionately after the outbreak, following isolation protocols and donating to hospitals and non-profit organisations.

In a separate interview with The Age also published in May 2020, Liu criticised Victorian Premier Daniel Andrews and the Labor Party for their 2018 Memorandum of Understanding with China, which nominally signed up the state as part of the Belt and Road initiative. Citing its "lack of transparency", she told the newspaper: "Premier Andrews didn't talk to the federal government, so we didn't know about it ... The most important thing is, what are Victorians, what are Australians getting out of it? How many jobs have the projects been able to provide? What are these companies getting these projects? Have [the projects] been put up for public tender? Do they pay Australian tax? We don't know. If there is a benefit, then show us."

In November 2020, Liu joined with several other Australian MPs in condemning the disqualification by China of four members of the Hong Kong Legislative Council. Liu told The Sydney Morning Herald, she was saddened by the move as it meant "the democracy that I enjoyed is disappearing".

In July 2022, Liu ran for Liberal Party preselection for a spot on party's ticket for the North Eastern Metropolitan Region in the Victorian Legislative Council, but was unsuccessful.

== Controversies ==
=== Investigations into foreign interference ===
In 2019, media reports linked Liu to an external influence organisation called the World Trade United Foundation, which has ties to the United Front Work Department, which manages interest groups in support of the Chinese Communist Party. Many of the World Trade United Foundation's members are also members of Chinese People's Political Consultative Conference. In response to the reports, Liu said that she left the World Trade United Foundation in 2016. Liu was also reported to have been a member of two other front organisations from 2003 to 2015 that were both later rolled into the United Front Work Department. Liu responded that she could not recall if she had been a member of the department over the 12-year period.

It has also been reported that in 2018 the Australian Security Intelligence Organisation (ASIO) had vetted certain guests at a "meet and greet" organised by Liu, and suggested that then-PM Malcolm Turnbull not attend it.

In November 2019, media reports emerged that Liu had connections to an alleged Chinese spy, Nick Zhao – based on two images showing Zhao sitting next to Liu at a meeting for the Eastern Multicultural Branch of the Victorian Liberal Party on 26 January 2016, in Liu's former home. Zhao claimed that he had been offered over $1 million by an unnamed Chinese businessman to infiltrate the Australian Government by running for the seat of Chisholm. Zhao reported the alleged cultivation to ASIO. Liu said that she "had no recollection" of meeting Zhao.

Australian Prime Minister Scott Morrison expressed his support for Liu and stated that criticism of the MP was racially motivated. Morrison dubbed the attacks on Liu a "smear" campaign with a "grubby undertone". Morrison refused to comment on whether Australian intelligence agencies have previously investigated Liu.

At the 2017 Victorian Liberal Party conference, the party's Eastern Multicultural Branch, of which Liu was president, proposed a motion that would make foreign investment in agribusiness and agricultural land permissible without prior approval of the Foreign Investment Review Board.

Liu was reported to have failed to declare a $39,675 AUD donation to the Victorian Liberal Party in 2015–2016.

It was alleged by Labor Senator Penny Wong that Liu promised to write reference letters for foreign students' residency applications if they volunteered on her campaign.

In December 2019, The Sydney Morning Herald reported that Liu assisted in securing meetings with federal politicians for the Australian subsidiary of Brighsun, a Chinese-controlled energy group. Brighsun was later implicated in a drug money laundering probe conducted by the Australian Federal Police and the Australian Criminal Intelligence Commission.

In January 2021, the Australian Broadcasting Corporation reported that ASIO was investigating a donor with ties to Liu over foreign interference risks.

=== Anti-LGBTIQ remarks ===
In a 2016 interview with The Guardian, Liu was recorded as referring to "same-sex, transgender, intergender" as "ridiculous rubbish". When questioned about this in 2019, Liu originally called the recording “fake news”, later claiming she meant these remarks to be representative of the Chinese community rather than her own views, although this was fact-checked and debunked by the interviewer. Liu also campaigned against the anti-bullying program Safe Schools.

== Personal life ==
Liu has two children.

Parliament of Australia
Preceded by Julia Banks	Member for Chisholm; 2019–2022	Succeeded by Carina Garland
