= Julia Banks =

Australian politician

Julia Banks FAICD
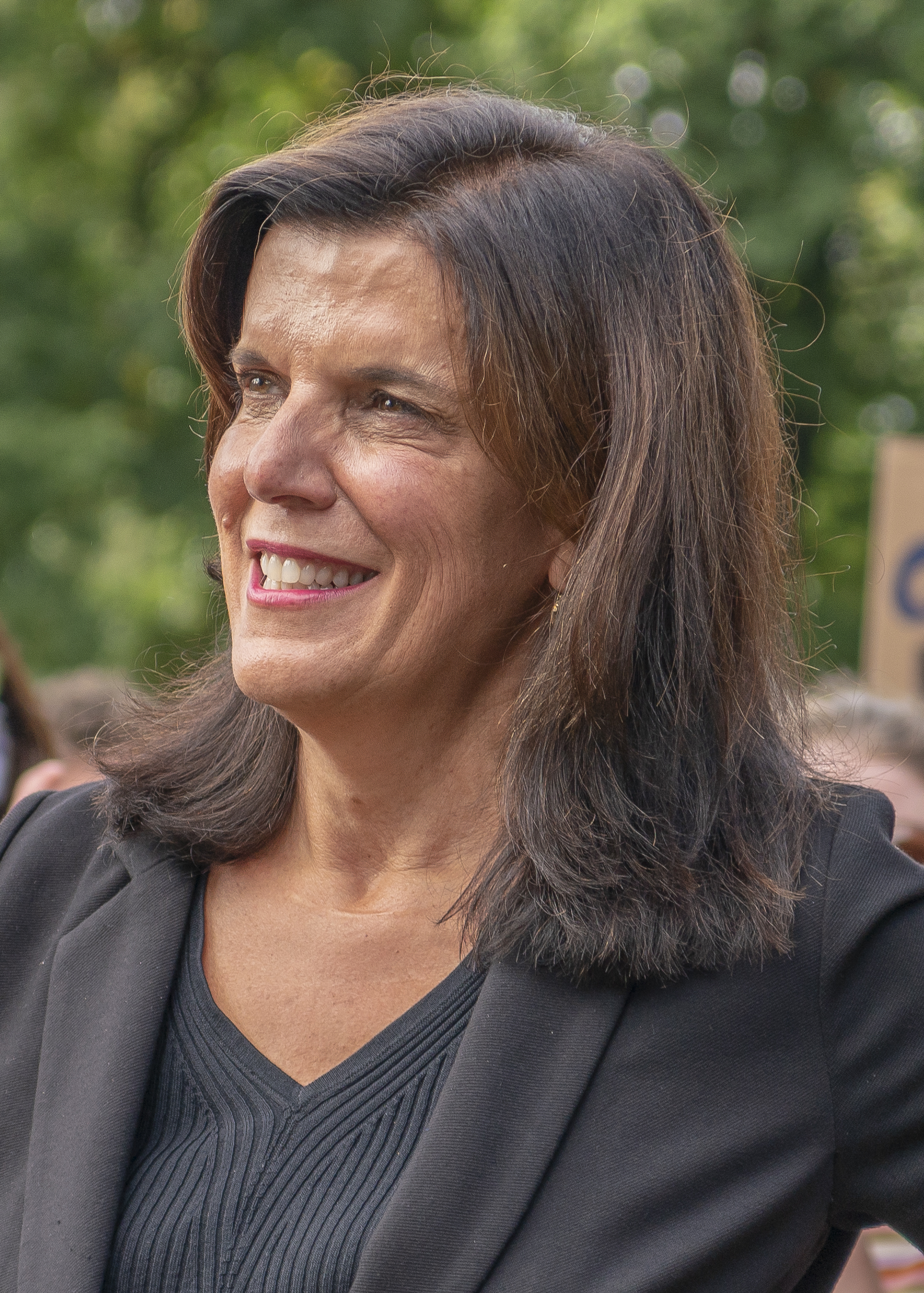
- Banks in 2021

Member of the Australian Parliament for Chisholm
- In office 2 July 2016 – 11 April 2019
- Preceded by: Anna Burke
- Succeeded by: Gladys Liu

Personal details
- Born: Julia Helen Lolatgis; 18 September 1962 (age 64) Melbourne, Victoria, Australia
- Party: Liberal (before 2018); Independent (2018–present)
- Education: Monash University (BA, LLB)

Julia Helen Banks is an Australian lawyer and politician. Elected as the member for Chisholm in the Australian House of Representatives at the 2016 federal election, Banks was the only candidate for the governing Liberal-National Coalition to win a seat held by an opposition party. The previous member, Labor's Anna Burke, had held the seat since 1998 and did not stand for re-election in 2016. Following the Liberal Party leadership spill in August 2018 that saw Prime Minister Malcolm Turnbull replaced by Scott Morrison, Banks stated she would not contest the 2019 federal election; and in November 2018 she announced she had quit the party to become an independent MP and sit on the crossbench. She unsuccessfully contested the seat of Flinders at the 2019 election, pitting her against government frontbencher Greg Hunt.

== Early life ==
Banks was born in Victoria on 18 September 1962. She was raised in Melbourne. Her parents are both of Greek heritage and her father migrated to Australia from Greece as a 15-year-old. She studied Arts and Law at Monash University, graduating in 1984 and 1986, respectively. She has graduated from the Australian Institute of Company Directors (FAICD).

Banks worked as a lawyer in private practice principally in litigation and then joined Hoechst Australia Limited as Corporate Counsel. From 1992, she worked at Kraft Foods, rising from General Counsel to Senior Counsel and ultimately becoming the Director for Corporate Affairs (Australia, New Zealand, and the Asia-Pacific Regions). From 2009 to 2014, Banks served as General Counsel and Company Secretary for GlaxoSmithKline Australasia, also taking on the role of Head of Compliance and Risk Management. In 2014, she moved to George Weston Foods where she served as the Chief General Counsel and Company Secretary. She has also been a member of the Advisory Council on Intellectual Property and a Director of the Australian Made company.

== Political career ==
Banks was elected to the House of Representatives as the Member for Chisholm at the 2016 federal election. Traditionally a marginal seat, Banks won 45.3% of the first preference votes and was elected with 51.2% of the two-party-preferred vote, defeating the Labor candidate Stefanie Perri. She succeeded Labor's Anna Burke, who had held the seat since 1998 and had announced in 2015 she was retiring from politics. Banks was the only candidate for the governing Liberal-National Coalition to win a seat held by an opposition party at the 2016 election. Banks' knife-edge victory was critical in allowing the Coalition to eke out a bare majority of one seat after suffering a 14-seat swing.

Since her election, Banks has served on two standing committees of the House, dealing with Economics and Social Policy and Legal Affairs. She became chair of the latter committee in February 2018.

=== Citizenship controversy ===
In July 2017, Banks' Greek heritage led to her being one of several members of parliament to come under scrutiny over the possibility that they held another citizenship by descent. Dual citizens are generally ineligible to be elected or sit as a member of parliament under section 44 of the Australian Constitution. The Liberal Party moved to investigate and clarify Banks' citizenship status, as her seat in the House of Representatives was critical to the Turnbull government's one-seat majority. The Liberal Party later stated that it confirmed with the Greek Embassy in Australia that Banks is not registered as a Greek citizen.

=== Advocacy ===
In October 2017, Banks re-confirmed her support for same-sex marriage in an opinion-editorial in The Age, citing her passion "about equality for all ...because marriage equality is about love, family and fairness" in a Facebook post linking to the article.

In May 2018, during a radio discussion of Newstart unemployment allowance, she was called "out of touch" after she said she could live on $40 a day leading to calls for her to be challenged to do so.

=== Departure from Liberal Party ===
In August 2018, following the Liberal Party leadership crisis that saw Prime Minister Malcolm Turnbull replaced by Scott Morrison, Banks announced that she would not contest the seat of Chisholm at the next federal election. She described the ousting of Turnbull from the Prime Ministership as the "last straw" and cited a "cultural and gender bias, bullying and intimidation" of women in politics. In the statement which she posted on Twitter announcing her decision, Banks stated that she had been subjected to "bullying and intimidation ... both from within my own party and from the Labor party" and was supported by Minister for Women Kelly O'Dwyer (the member for the neighbouring electorate of Higgins) who stated that workplace bullying is unacceptable in any workplace, including parliament. Incoming Prime Minister Scott Morrison and his deputy Josh Frydenberg reportedly attempted to persuade Banks not to quit, but Banks was adamant that she would not remain after the "vindictive" behaviour and "internal political games [of] factional party figures, self-proclaimed power-brokers and certain media personalities."

Morrison subsequently expressed concern for Banks' welfare, promised to stamp out bullying within the Liberal party, and thanked her for not quitting parliament immediately, so that there will not be need for a by-election for her marginal seat. Craig Kelly, who was among the first to call for the spill in support of unsuccessful challenger Peter Dutton, criticised Banks' decision in a Sky News interview and defended politics as a "rough-and-tumble game." Political journalist Malcolm Farr described Banks' announcement as a "blistering farewell" that gives "an indication of the heavy toll this week of chaos and political thuggery will have on the [Liberal] party." He went on to state that the anti-Turnbull plotters employed "a strategy of bullying and intimidation" and have been "eventually proved to have an incompetence to match their brutality [and are] a disaster for the parliamentary party."

On 27 November 2018, Banks announced in a speech on the floor of the House of Representatives that she would, with immediate effect, leave the Liberal Party to sit on the crossbench as an independent MP. Her decision put the Morrison government further into minority, reducing its numbers on the floor of the House to 73. Banks slammed the Liberal Party for allegedly shifting too far to the right of the political spectrum, arguing the party had "changed largely due to the actions of the reactionary and regressive right wing who talk about and to themselves rather than listening to the people." She went on to say that "sensible centrist values" were no longer compatible with the Liberal Party. Banks also stated that she would provide confidence and supply to the government if necessary; and also said that her previously-announced retirement from politics at the forthcoming general election was not a final decision.

On 31 January 2019 Banks announced that she would challenge health minister, and former Liberal Party colleague, Greg Hunt as an independent at the federal election later that year, seeking to win the seat of Flinders. She received around 14% of the primary vote, ranking third amongst all candidates in the seat, thus not being reelected to parliament.

In July 2021 her memoir, Power Play: Breaking Through Bias, Barriers and Boys' Clubs, was published by Hardie Grant and reviewed for The Sydney Morning Herald by Jenna Price.

In October 2021 Banks was named as an advisor for climate fund, Climate 200.

Parliament of Australia
Preceded by Anna Burke	Member for Chisholm; 2016–2019	Succeeded by Gladys Liu
