= Anna Burke =

Australian politician (born 1966)

The Honourable Anna Burke AO
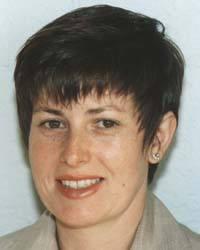

28th Speaker of the Australian House of Representatives
- In office 9 October 2012 – 5 August 2013
- Deputy: Bruce Scott
- Preceded by: Peter Slipper
- Succeeded by: Bronwyn Bishop

Deputy Speaker of the Australian House of Representatives
- In office 24 November 2011 – 9 October 2012
- Preceded by: Peter Slipper
- Succeeded by: Bruce Scott
- In office 12 February 2008 – 28 September 2010
- Preceded by: Harry Jenkins
- Succeeded by: Peter Slipper

Member of the Australian Parliament for Chisholm
- In office 3 October 1998 – 9 May 2016
- Preceded by: Michael Wooldridge
- Succeeded by: Julia Banks

Personal details
- Born: Anna Elizabeth Burke; 1 January 1966 (age 60) Melbourne, Victoria, Australia
- Party: Labor Party
- Spouse: Stephen Burgess (m. 1994)
- Children: Two
- Education: Presentation College, Windsor
- Alma mater: University of Melbourne; Monash University
- Occupation: Union representative, Politician

Anna Elizabeth Burke AO (born 1 January 1966) is an Australian former politician who served as the 28th speaker of the Australian House of Representatives from October 2012 to August 2013, and was Acting Speaker from May to October 2012. A member of the Australian Labor Party (ALP), she was the member of parliament (MP) for the division of Chisholm from 1998 to 2016.

Burke was a trade union representative before being selected by the Australian Labor Party to stand for the seat of Chisholm in 1998. She served as deputy speaker of the Australian House of Representatives twice from 2008 to 2010 and again from 2011 until the resignation of Speaker Peter Slipper due to allegations of fraud and sexual harassment in 2012. She was the second woman to become Speaker and held the office until the 2013 federal election, in which the Rudd government was defeated.

While in parliament, both as a member of the government and the opposition, Burke campaigned against offshore processing and mandatory detention of refugees, policies all of the major parties supported at the time. Burke retired from politics at the 2016 federal election. She is a current member of the Administrative Appeals Tribunal (AAT) and an Officer of the Order of Australia. Since leaving politics, Burke has also served on the boards of several foundations and companies.

== Early life and education ==
Anna Elizabeth Burke was born on 1 January 1966 in Melbourne and was one of five children. Her father was an electrician and her mother a was kindergarten teacher.

Burke attended Presentation College, Windsor, and was diagnosed with dyslexia in grade 5, which led to her taking her high-school exams orally. In 1988, she graduated from Monash University with a Bachelor of Arts degree with Honours in English Literature, and in 1994, she graduated from the University of Melbourne with a Master of Commerce with Honours in Industrial Relations and Human Resource Management.

== Career ==
Before entering politics, Anna Burke worked as a trade union official and a human resources manager. In these capacities, she worked for VicRoads from 1988 to 1993 and for Victoria University (then the Victorian Institute of Technology) from 1993 to 1994. In 1994, Burke joined the Finance Sector Union as National Industrial Officer, and was responsible for coordinating campaigns and being a spokesperson.

=== Entry into politics ===
In 1996, Burke joined the Ashwood branch of the Australian Labor Party (ALP) and in 1997, the ALP selected her as an electoral candidate for the Division of Chisholm, which was then held by Liberal Minister for Health and Family Services Michael Wooldridge, who had held it for 11 years. Burke was not expected to win the seat but after Wooldridge switched to the Division of Casey, she won the seat at the 1998 federal election against the Liberal Party candidate Peter Vlahos with a 4.67% swing to Labor (2PP).

=== Time in parliament ===
In 2005, Anna Burke submitted a private member's bill to the house that proposed an early form of the subsequently created Do Not Call Register, which allows people with fixed telephone lines to opt out from telemarketing. After Labor's win at the 2007 federal election, Burke was elected as Deputy Speaker of the Australian House of Representatives, who presides over the House in the Speaker's absence. In February 2008, just a few sitting days into the Parliament, Prime Minister Kevin Rudd was absent from the House while he was visiting flood victims in Mackay, Queensland. To protest Rudd's absence, the Opposition took a cardboard cut-out of Rudd into the chamber. Burke requested the "offensive article" be removed from the House, which caused some laughter from the opposition, along with the Member for Cowper Luke Hartsuyker. Hartsuyker refused to leave the house, causing Burke to suspend the sitting of parliament. While Deputy Speaker, Burke argued for the banning of websites that promote eating disorders but was not successful. Burke continued to advocate for awareness of eating disorders throughout her time in parliament.

In 2011, Speaker Harry Jenkins announced his resignation from the Speakership, saying he wanted to be more involved in Labor Party matters as a backbencher. The government nominated Peter Slipper, the member for the Division of Fisher, to become Speaker. In response, the Manager of Opposition Business Christopher Pyne nominated a number of government members to become Speaker, starting with Burke. All nominated government members declined their nominations. Slipper accepted his nomination and took the chair as Speaker. On the same day, Burke accepted the Government's nomination for the position of Deputy Speaker and was elected to that position in a ballot.

In April 2012, Slipper announced he was standing aside, meaning he would remain Speaker but would not attend sessions of the House until fraud allegations made against him were resolved. The Opposition called for Slipper to stay away from the chamber until sexual harassment charges were resolved as well. In October 2012, Slipper resigned as Speaker of the House. Later that evening, Burke was nominated and elected the new Speaker of the House of Representatives unopposed, becoming the second woman to hold the position after Joan Child. As Speaker, Burke instructed members not to refer to her as "Madam Speaker" but rather as "Speaker". This precedent was not followed by her successor Bronwyn Bishop, who requested to be called "Madam Speaker". Burke also gained a reputation as "straight-talking" and for using a "death stare" as Speaker.

In May 2012, Labor-turned-independent Member of Parliament Craig Thomson, who was embattled with the Health Services Union expenses affair, unexpectedly sided with the Opposition during a parliamentary division. To avoid accepting the "tainted vote" of Thomson, several Opposition members, including the leader Tony Abbott, ran for the doors. Burke had already asked for the doors to be locked so members were prevented from leaving the chamber. While Speaker, Burke unsuccessfully called for a national ban on child beauty pageants. In August 2012, Burke invoked Standing Order 94A to eject Abbott from the House for one hour for refusing to withdraw a statement "without qualification". The ejection of an opposition leader was rare and had not occurred since the ejection of John Howard in 1986, and has not happened again since. In 2013, people in the public gallery interrupted question time several times by calling Prime Minister Julia Gillard a liar. This led to Burke stating: "This is Question Time. It is not a football match", and several individuals were removed from the gallery. In August 2013, Burke's Melbourne electorate office was vandalised with graffiti that said "fre [sic] the refugees" and the windows were smashed in protest of the federal government's policy on asylum seekers. Opposition finance spokesperson Andrew Robb's nearby office was similarly vandalised.

In the 2013 federal election, Burke suffered a 4.18% swing (2PP) against her in Chisholm but was re-elected with 51.6% of the 2PP vote. Her tenure as Speaker ended with the defeat of the Rudd government, after which the incoming Abbott government appointed Bronwyn Bishop as Speaker. Burke then sought to become chief Opposition whip in the Bill Shorten–led Opposition but was not successful. Burke stated she had been unsuccessful in being appointed to the frontbench because of factional manoeuvring and that Labor had "failed women" by not appointing ministers based on merit, overlooking qualified women. In 2014, Burke appeared on the Australian Broadcasting Corporation's (ABC) panel show Q+A, which was disrupted by protesters unfurling a banner and voicing criticism of education minister Christopher Pyne. In 2015, Burke announced she would not re-contest her seat at the 2016 federal election. She was replaced as the Member for Chisholm by Liberal MP Julia Banks, who was the only Liberal–National Coalition candidate to win a seat held by an opposition party in 2016.

=== Career after politics ===
Anna Burke's official portrait as Speaker of the House was painted in 2015 by Sydney artist Jude Rae, making it the first portrait in Parliament's Historical Memorials Collection that both depicts and was painted by a woman. The portrait was unveiled at Parliament House, Canberra, in 2017. In the 2019 Australia Day Honours, Burke was made an Officer of the Order of Australia for "distinguished service to the Parliament of Australia, particularly as Speaker of the House of Representatives, and to the community".

From 2016 to 2018, Burke served as the chair of Allergy and Anaphylaxis Australia. As of 2024, Burke is a board member of the Institute for Breathing and Sleep since 2016, a board member of RedR Australia since 2018, and chair of the Monash University Accident Research Centre since 2019.

In 2017, Burke was appointed a full-time member of the General, Freedom of Information, and Veterans' Appeals Divisions of the Administrative Appeals Tribunal, where her term is due to end in 2024. In 2024, Burke was the lead decision-maker on a case involving a New Zealand-born man referred to as CHCY, who had his visa cancelled due to being convicted for child sexual abuse. The AAT overturned the cancellation of CHCY's visa, stating that CHCY should be allowed to stay in Australia due to his ties to the community, and that his wife and children would move to New Zealand with him were he to be deported, and that the victim in this case had moved to New Zealand already.

== Political beliefs ==
=== Refugee policy ===
Burke is an outspoken critic of Labor policy on asylum seekers. She is an opponent of offshore detention, a policy that was supported by all major parties during her time in parliament. Burke opposed the Gillard Government's Malaysian Solution, a deal by which Malaysia would accept 800 asylum seekers from Australia. Burke stated she felt "deeply uneasy with the [government's] approach" of using Manus Island as an offshore detention site, and that she was "not in favour of mandatory detention, particularly of women and children". She added her role as Speaker prevented her from strongly advocating on this matter in parliament. In 2013, in a discussion of refugee policy at a community forum in her electorate, Burke said she "sometimes wondered [why she ran for the Labor party]". In 2014, following the death of an asylum seeker in Australian detention on Manus Island, Burke wrote an article for The Guardian to call for a total end to offshore detention. Together with fellow Labor parliamentarian Melissa Parke, Burke tabled a motion at ALP caucus in 2014 to cease the transfer of asylum seekers to Manus Island and Nauru, and to close the detention centres there. The motion was defeated. In 2016, Burke joined a working group that included Members of Parliament and religious leaders to formulate new policy on asylum seekers. Responding to Burke's announcement of her retirement from parliament in 2016, Opposition Leader Bill Shorten described Burke as a "fearless and tireless advocate for the rights of asylum seekers". In her parliamentary valedictory speech, Burke described offshore detention centres as a "festering wound".

=== Food allergies ===
Because her son has a severe peanut allergy, Burke became interested in policy on food allergies. In 2014, Burke proposed the creation of a National Allergen register, and in 2015, she established the Parliamentary Allergy Alliance in cooperation with Australian Greens leader Richard Di Natale and ALP MP Tony Zappia.

== Personal life ==
In 1994, Burke married Stephen Burgess. The couple have two children; in 1999, when her first child was born, Burke became the second woman to give birth while a sitting Member of the Australian Parliament. Burke had her second child in 2002.

Parliament of Australia
Preceded by Michael Wooldridge	Member for Chisholm; 1998–2016	Succeeded by Julia Banks
Preceded by Peter Slipper	Speaker of the Australian House of Representatives; 2012–2013	Succeeded by Bronwyn Bishop
