= Division of Chisholm =

Australian federal electoral division

Coordinates: 37.865°S 145.123°E

Chisholm Australian House of Representatives Division
- Interactive map of electorate boundaries from the 2025 federal election
- Created: 1949
- MP: Carina Garland
- Party: Labor
- Namesake: Caroline Chisholm
- Electors: 122,795 (2025)
- Area: 73 km^{2} (28.2 sq mi)
- Demographic: Inner metropolitan
Electorates around Chisholm:
Kooyong	Menzies	Deakin
Kooyong	Chisholm	Aston
Macnamara	Hotham	Bruce

The Division of Chisholm (/ˈtʃɪzəm/ CHIZ-əm) is an Australian Electoral Division in Victoria located in the eastern suburbs of Melbourne. The Division was created in 1949 and is named after Caroline Chisholm, a social worker and promoter of women's immigration. The Division is an Inner Metropolitan area.

The Division's current MP is Carina Garland of the Australian Labor Party. The constituency is considered a key marginal constituency targeted by both Labor and the Liberal Party of Australia.

== Geography ==
Since 1984, federal electoral division boundaries in Australia have been determined at redistributions by a redistribution committee appointed by the Australian Electoral Commission. Redistributions occur for the boundaries of divisions in a particular state, and they occur every seven years, or sooner if a state's representation entitlement changes or when divisions of a state are malapportioned.

Since 2022, the Division has encompassed the suburbs of Ashwood, Blackburn, Blackburn South, Box Hill, Box Hill South, Burwood, Burwood East, Glen Waverley, Laburnum, Mount Waverley, Notting Hill, Syndal and Wheelers Hill. Additionally, the Division also includes parts of Chadstone, Clayton, Mulgrave and Oakleigh.

The Division of Chisholm consists of part of the local government areas of Monash City Council and Whitehorse City Council.

== Demographics ==
The Division of Chisholm has a diverse population, with around 54% of its residents being born overseas. Approximately 55% of the population speak a language other than English at home, with Chinese Australians making around 30% of the population. The seat has the largest Chinese community of any electorate in all of Australia.

== History ==
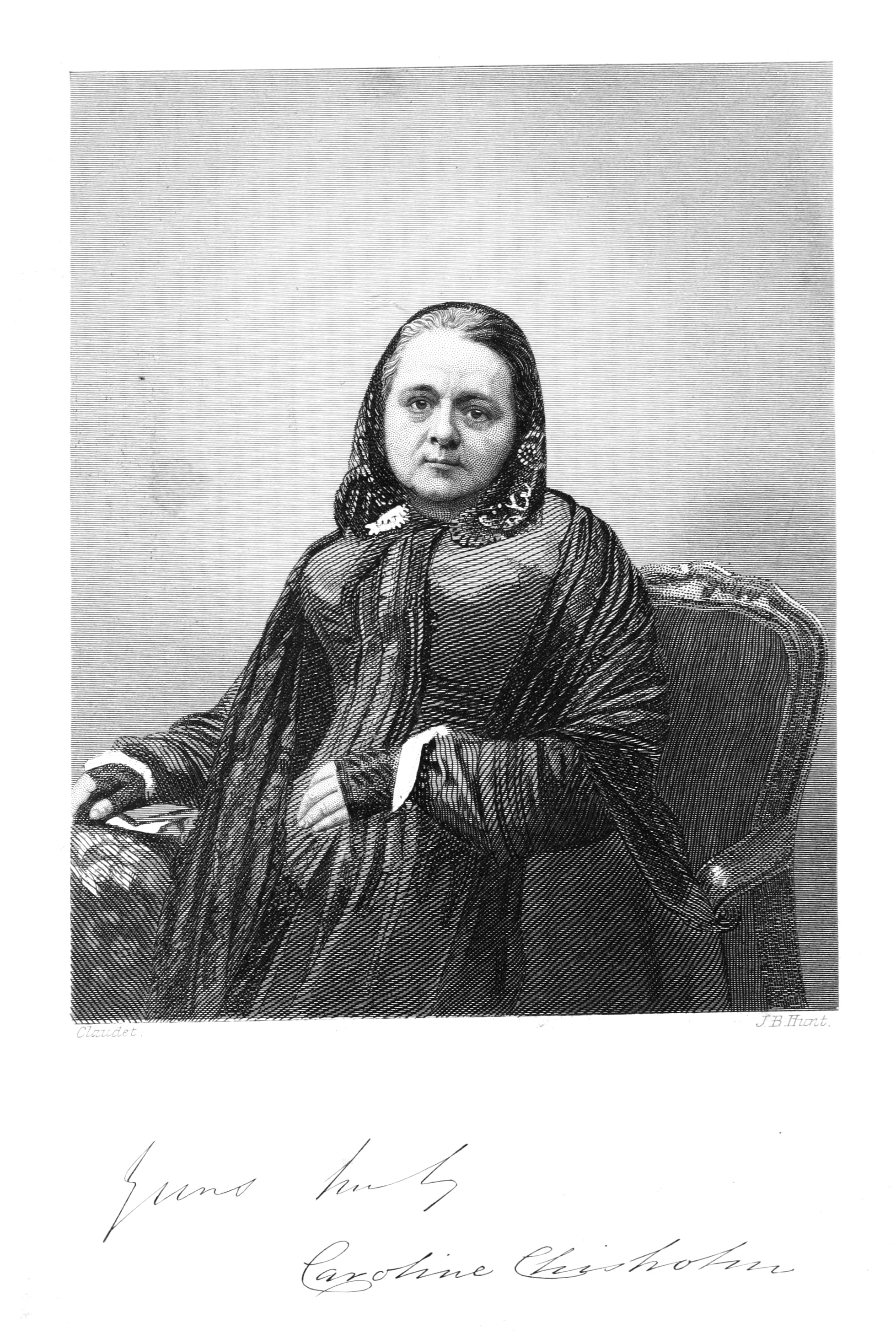
Caroline Chisholm, the division's namesake

On its original boundaries, it was a comfortably safe Liberal seat centred on Camberwell. However, successive redistributions from 1980 onward have moved the electorate south-east, taking in strongly Labor-voting suburbs to balance out the relatively affluent Liberal-leaning suburbs in the north of the seat, and making the seat marginal. The first member for Chisholm, Sir Wilfrid Kent Hughes, was one of Australia's most distinguished soldiers and a former Olympian, who held the seat until his death on 31 July 1970.

Labor finally took the seat in the 1983 landslide that brought Bob Hawke to power, only to lose it in 1987. Anna Burke became the second Labor member ever to win it in 1998 election and held it until her retirement in 2016. Julia Banks won the seat for the Liberals at the 2016 election, becoming the only Liberal challenger to take a seat from Labor at that election. Taking this seat off Labor turned out to be crucial in ensuring the Coalition retaining its majority; it meant they had 76 seats, as opposed to the 75 they would have had if Labor had retained this seat.

On 27 November 2018, Banks resigned from the Liberal Party due to disaffection with the party resulting from the leadership spill which removed Malcolm Turnbull as Prime Minister and the treatment of women within the party. Banks announced she would sit on the crossbench as an independent, but guarantee confidence and supply to the Morrison government.

Gladys Liu won Chisholm in the 2019 election for the Liberal Party against Jennifer Yang by less than 0.6%, becoming the first Chinese Australian to enter the lower house.

In 2022, Labor's Dr Carina Garland won the seat from Liberal incumbent Liu. The loss of the seat in 2022 to Labor has been attributed to the notably large swings against the Liberal Party among Chinese Australian voters which has cost the Liberal Party many key seats.

== Members ==
Image	Member	Party	Term	Notes
	Sir Wilfrid Kent Hughes (1895–1970)	Liberal	10 December 1949 – 31 July 1970	Previously held the Victorian Legislative Assembly seat of Kew. Served as minister under Menzies. Died in office
	Tony Staley (1939–2023)	Liberal	19 September 1970 – 19 September 1980	Served as minister under Fraser. Retired
	Graham Harris (1937–)	Liberal	18 October 1980 – 5 March 1983	Lost seat
	Helen Mayer (1932–2008)	Labor	5 March 1983 – 11 July 1987	Lost seat
	Michael Wooldridge (1956–)	Liberal	11 July 1987 – 3 October 1998	Served as minister under Howard. Transferred to the Division of Casey
	Anna Burke (1966–)	Labor	3 October 1998 – 9 May 2016	Served as Speaker during the Gillard and Rudd Governments. Retired
	Julia Banks (1962–)	Liberal	2 July 2016 – 27 November 2018	Did not contest in 2019. Failed to win the Division of Flinders
	Julia Banks (1962–)	Independent	27 November 2018 – 18 May 2019	Did not contest in 2019. Failed to win the Division of Flinders
	Gladys Liu (1964–)	Liberal	18 May 2019 – 21 May 2022	Lost seat
	Carina Garland (1982–)	Labor	21 May 2022 – present	Incumbent

== Election results ==
2025 Australian federal election: Chisholm
Party	Candidate	Votes	%	±%
Labor	Carina Garland	43,655	38.74	+3.98
Liberal	Katie Allen	41,966	37.24	−1.96
Greens	Tim Randall	14,086	12.50	−1.56
Independent	Kath Davies	6,685	5.93	+5.93
Family First	Gary Ong	2,419	2.15	+2.15
One Nation	Guy Livori	2,156	1.91	+0.95
Trumpet of Patriots	Christine McShane	1,729	1.53	+1.01
Total formal votes		112,696	97.62	+1.61
Informal votes		2,747	2.38	−1.61
Turnout		115,443	94.06	+1.38
Two-party-preferred result
Labor	Carina Garland	62,773	55.70	+2.37
Liberal	Katie Allen	49,923	44.30	−2.37
Labor hold		Swing	+2.37	
