= Electoral results for the Division of McPherson =

Australian division election results

This is a list of electoral results for the Division of McPherson in Australian federal elections from the division's creation in 1949 until the present.

== Members ==
Member	Party	Term
(Sir) Arthur Fadden	Country	1949–1958
Charles Barnes	Country	1958–1972
Eric Robinson	Liberal	1972–1981
Peter White	Liberal	1981–1990
John Bradford	Liberal	1990–1998
John Bradford	Christian Democratic	1998
Margaret May	Liberal	1998–2010
Karen Andrews	Liberal National	2010–2025
Leon Rebello	Liberal National	2025–present

== Election results ==
=== Elections in the 2020s ===
==== 2025 ====
2025 Australian federal election: McPherson
Party	Candidate	Votes	%	±%
Liberal National	Leon Rebello	34,918	35.92	−7.64
Labor	Alice Price	22,778	23.43	+1.43
Independent	Erchana Murray-Bartlett	13,366	13.75	+13.75
Greens	Amanda Kennealy	8,175	8.41	−7.01
One Nation	Zyion Attiig	4,229	4.35	−2.87
People First	Harry Hatzikalimnios	3,158	3.25	+3.25
Legalise Cannabis	Jeff Knipe	2,751	2.83	+2.83
Trumpet of Patriots	Max Creswick	2,681	2.76	+2.15
Libertarian	Gary Biggs	1,432	1.47	−0.65
Family First	Neena Tester	1,366	1.41	+1.41
Independent	Michelle Faye	1,221	1.26	+1.26
Animal Justice	Jennifer Horsburgh	1,140	1.17	+1.17
Total formal votes		97,215	91.55	−3.03
Informal votes		8,968	8.45	+3.03
Turnout		106,183	87.36	−0.20
Two-party-preferred result
Liberal National	Leon Rebello	52,920	54.44	−4.90
Labor	Alice Price	44,295	45.56	+4.90
Liberal National hold		Swing	−4.90	

==== 2022 ====
2022 Australian federal election: McPherson
Party	Candidate	Votes	%	±%
Liberal National	Karen Andrews	42,288	43.56	−4.68
Labor	Carl Ungerer	21,354	22.00	−0.85
Greens	Scott Turner	14,971	15.42	+4.43
One Nation	Kevin Hargraves	7,013	7.22	+1.36
United Australia	Joshua Berrigan	6,490	6.69	+3.36
Australian Values	Andy Cullen	2,310	2.38	+2.38
Liberal Democrats	Glenn Pyne	2,063	2.12	−1.36
Federation	Gary Pead	594	0.61	+0.61
Total formal votes		97,083	94.58	+0.91
Informal votes		5,565	5.42	−0.91
Turnout		102,648	87.56	−2.84
Two-party-preferred result
Liberal National	Karen Andrews	57,605	59.34	−2.86
Labor	Carl Ungerer	39,478	40.66	+2.86
Liberal National hold		Swing	−2.86	

Alluvial diagram for preference flows in the seat of McPherson in the 2022 federal election. indicates at what stage the winning candidate had over 50% of the votes and was declared the winner.

=== Elections in the 2010s ===
==== 2019 ====
2019 Australian federal election: McPherson
Party	Candidate	Votes	%	±%
Liberal National	Karen Andrews	44,634	48.24	−5.05
Labor	Aaron Santelises	21,138	22.85	−3.15
Greens	Alan Quinn	10,167	10.99	+0.71
One Nation	John Spellman	5,421	5.86	+5.86
Liberal Democrats	Scott Crowe	3,222	3.48	+3.48
United Australia	Fiona Mackenzie	3,078	3.33	+3.33
Animal Justice	Renee Stewart	2,367	2.56	+2.56
Independent	Michael Kaff	1,648	1.78	+1.78
Conservative National	Sean Gaffy	846	0.91	+0.91
Total formal votes		92,521	93.67	−1.86
Informal votes		6,250	6.33	+1.86
Turnout		98,771	90.40	+0.91
Two-party-preferred result
Liberal National	Karen Andrews	57,545	62.20	+0.56
Labor	Aaron Santelises	34,976	37.80	−0.56
Liberal National hold		Swing	+0.56	

==== 2016 ====
2016 Australian federal election: McPherson
Party	Candidate	Votes	%	±%
Liberal National	Karen Andrews	47,284	53.29	+3.13
Labor	Sandy Gadd	23,069	26.00	+3.25
Greens	Peter Burgoyne	9,119	10.28	+3.42
Family First	Simon Green	5,404	6.09	+2.37
Independent	Rob Jones	3,850	4.34	+4.34
Total formal votes		88,726	95.53	+0.74
Informal votes		4,151	4.47	−0.74
Turnout		92,877	89.51	−3.10
Two-party-preferred result
Liberal National	Karen Andrews	54,687	61.64	−1.36
Labor	Sandy Gadd	34,039	38.36	+1.36
Liberal National hold		Swing	−1.36	

==== 2013 ====
2013 Australian federal election: McPherson
Party	Candidate	Votes	%	±%
Liberal National	Karen Andrews	41,594	50.16	−3.74
Labor	Gail Hislop	18,866	22.75	−6.11
Palmer United	Susan Douglas	13,203	15.92	+15.92
Greens	David Wyatt	5,689	6.86	−5.54
Family First	Simon Green	3,084	3.72	−1.12
Australian Voice	Charles Blake	491	0.59	+0.59
Total formal votes		82,927	94.79	+0.69
Informal votes		4,559	5.21	−0.69
Turnout		87,486	92.61	+0.60
Two-party-preferred result
Liberal National	Karen Andrews	52,244	63.00	+2.72
Labor	Gail Hislop	30,683	37.00	−2.72
Liberal National hold		Swing	+2.72	

==== 2010 ====
2010 Australian federal election: McPherson
Party	Candidate	Votes	%	±%
Liberal National	Karen Andrews	42,069	53.90	−0.93
Labor	Dan Byron	22,526	28.86	−6.99
Greens	Ben O'Callaghan	9,676	12.40	+6.49
Family First	Matthew Reeves	3,777	4.84	+3.33
Total formal votes		78,048	94.10	−2.73
Informal votes		4,890	5.90	+2.73
Turnout		82,938	92.06	−2.67
Two-party-preferred result
Liberal National	Karen Andrews	47,044	60.28	+1.63
Labor	Dan Byron	31,004	39.72	−1.63
Liberal National hold		Swing	+1.63	

=== Elections in the 2000s ===
==== 2007 ====
2007 Australian federal election: McPherson
Party	Candidate	Votes	%	±%
Liberal	Margaret May	45,979	54.98	−3.96
Labor	Eddy Sarroff	29,798	35.63	+5.55
Greens	Ben O'Callaghan	4,986	5.96	+0.79
Family First	Kevin Davis	1,282	1.53	−1.30
Democrats	Lori Carnwell	791	0.95	−0.13
Independent	Tyrone Jackson	666	0.80	+0.80
Citizens Electoral Council	Geoff Cornell	127	0.15	+0.10
Total formal votes		83,629	96.84	+2.09
Informal votes		2,727	3.16	−2.09
Turnout		86,356	93.54	−0.55
Two-party-preferred result
Liberal	Margaret May	49,195	58.83	−5.11
Labor	Eddy Sarroff	34,434	41.17	+5.11
Liberal hold		Swing	−5.11	

==== 2004 ====
2004 Australian federal election: McPherson
Party	Candidate	Votes	%	±%
Liberal	Margaret May	43,124	58.95	+4.06
Labor	Kellie Trigger	22,037	30.13	+1.37
Greens	Ian Latto	3,789	5.18	+0.25
Family First	Rob Davey	2,063	2.82	+2.82
One Nation	Paul Lewis	1,347	1.84	−4.21
Democrats	Russell White	788	1.08	−3.02
Total formal votes		73,148	94.73	−0.01
Informal votes		4,069	5.27	+0.01
Turnout		77,217	93.16	+1.69
Two-party-preferred result
Liberal	Margaret May	46,737	63.89	+1.72
Labor	Kellie Trigger	26,411	36.11	−1.72
Liberal hold		Swing	+1.72	

==== 2001 ====
2001 Australian federal election: McPherson
Party	Candidate	Votes	%	±%
Liberal	Margaret May	46,641	55.21	+10.04
Labor	Kellie Trigger	24,055	28.47	−4.65
One Nation	Paul Lewis	4,989	5.91	−3.67
Greens	Inge Light	4,220	5.00	+1.76
Democrats	Russell White	3,485	4.13	+0.30
Independent	Ronald Bradley	607	0.72	+0.72
Independent	Kevin Goodwin	481	0.57	−0.17
Total formal votes		84,478	94.67	−1.13
Informal votes		4,754	5.33	+1.13
Turnout		89,232	95.26	
Two-party-preferred result
Liberal	Margaret May	52,839	62.55	+4.21
Labor	Kellie Trigger	31,639	37.45	−4.21
Liberal hold		Swing	+4.21	

=== Elections in the 1990s ===
==== 1998 ====
1998 Australian federal election: McPherson
Party	Candidate	Votes	%	±%
Liberal	Margaret May	33,329	45.17	−16.39
Labor	Robert Poole	24,441	33.12	+6.96
One Nation	Peter Murphy	7,065	9.58	+9.58
National	Ted Shepherd	3,190	4.32	+4.30
Democrats	Lynne Grimsey	2,826	3.83	−2.61
Greens	John Palmer	2,390	3.24	−1.25
Independent	Kevin Goodwin	544	0.74	−0.18
Total formal votes		73,785	95.80	−1.39
Informal votes		3,235	4.20	+1.39
Turnout		77,020	93.81	−0.14
Two-party-preferred result
Liberal	Margaret May	43,045	58.34	−8.82
Labor	Robert Poole	30,740	41.66	+8.82
Liberal hold		Swing	−8.82	

==== 1996 ====
1996 Australian federal election: McPherson
Party	Candidate	Votes	%	±%
Liberal	John Bradford	42,640	61.57	+12.39
Labor	Margaret Andrews	18,122	26.17	−10.29
Democrats	Melinda Norman-Hicks	4,460	6.44	+2.65
Greens	Anja Light	3,109	4.49	+0.32
Independent	Kevin Goodwin	634	0.92	+0.92
Indigenous Peoples	David Dillon	284	0.41	+0.41
Total formal votes		69,249	97.18	−0.23
Informal votes		2,013	2.82	+0.23
Turnout		71,262	93.95	−0.93
Two-party-preferred result
Liberal	John Bradford	46,298	67.00	+8.56
Labor	Margaret Andrews	22,803	33.00	−8.56
Liberal hold		Swing	+8.56	

==== 1993 ====
1993 Australian federal election: McPherson
Party	Candidate	Votes	%	±%
Liberal	John Bradford	34,497	49.95	+0.81
Labor	Mark Whillans	24,718	35.79	+2.11
National	Allan de Brenni	3,082	4.46	−0.40
Greens	Christine Lovison	2,813	4.07	+4.07
Democrats	Jason Neville	2,574	3.73	−6.13
Confederate Action	Bruce Whiteside	1,381	2.00	+2.00
Total formal votes		69,065	97.42	−0.47
Informal votes		1,831	2.58	+0.47
Turnout		70,896	94.88	
Two-party-preferred result
Liberal	John Bradford	40,790	59.08	−0.83
Labor	Mark Whillans	28,253	40.92	+0.83
Liberal hold		Swing	−0.83	

==== 1990 ====
1990 Australian federal election: McPherson
Party	Candidate	Votes	%	±%
Liberal	John Bradford	40,986	50.2	+11.8
Labor	Pat Stern	26,607	32.6	−1.1
Democrats	Robert North	8,088	9.9	+4.6
National	Randall Cook	4,102	5.0	−17.6
Independent	Bert Cockerill	1,703	2.1	+2.1
Independent	Otto Kuhne	170	0.2	+0.2
Total formal votes		81,656	97.8	
Informal votes		1,812	2.2	
Turnout		83,468	93.5	
Two-party-preferred result
Liberal	John Bradford	49,760	61.0	−1.6
Labor	Pat Stern	31,769	39.0	+1.6
Liberal hold		Swing	−1.6	

=== Elections in the 1980s ===
==== 1987 ====
1987 Australian federal election: McPherson
Party	Candidate	Votes	%	±%
Liberal	Peter White	27,147	38.4	−1.4
Labor	Pat Stern	23,850	33.7	+1.5
National	Max McMahon	15,974	22.6	−0.6
Democrats	Yvonne Stoelhorst	3,746	5.3	+1.0
Total formal votes		70,717	96.8	
Informal votes		2,367	3.2	
Turnout		73,084	90.5	
Two-party-preferred result
Liberal	Peter White	44,263	62.6	−0.9
Labor	Pat Stern	26,454	37.4	+0.9
Liberal hold		Swing	−0.9	

==== 1984 ====
1984 Australian federal election: McPherson
Party	Candidate	Votes	%	±%
Liberal	Peter White	22,437	39.8	+3.3
Labor	Rupe Granrott	18,156	32.2	−1.0
National	Warren Tapp	13,072	23.2	−0.3
Democrats	Ken Peterson	2,398	4.3	−0.6
Independent	Maria Parer	321	0.6	+0.6
Total formal votes		56,384	94.7	
Informal votes		3,157	5.3	
Turnout		59,541	91.5	
Two-party-preferred result
Liberal	Peter White	35,820	63.5	+2.6
Labor	Rupe Granrott	20,564	36.5	−2.6
Liberal hold		Swing	+2.6	

==== 1983 ====
1983 Australian federal election: McPherson
Party	Candidate	Votes	%	±%
Liberal	Peter White	31,118	35.9	−7.4
Labor	Darryl McArthur	29,265	33.8	+3.0
National	Trevor Watt	20,328	23.5	+23.5
Democrats	Kenneth Peterson	4,254	4.9	−0.1
Humanitarian	Peter Courtney	1,687	1.9	+1.9
Total formal votes		86,652	98.5	
Informal votes		1,277	1.5	
Turnout		87,929	92.0	
Two-party-preferred result
Liberal	Peter White	52,282	60.3	+6.7
Labor	Darryl McArthur	34,370	39.7	−6.7
Liberal hold		Swing	+6.7	

==== 1981 by-election ====
1981 McPherson by-election
Party	Candidate	Votes	%	±%
Liberal	Peter White	29,776	41.9	−1.4
National Country	Glen Sheil	21,189	29.8	+29.8
Labor	Ronald McKenna	18,278	25.7	−5.1
Progress	Kevine Chaffey	537	0.8	+0.8
Independent	William Aabraham-Steer	512	0.7	−1.1
Independent	Hubert Giesberts	469	0.7	+0.7
Independent	Peter Courtney	290	0.4	+0.4
Total formal votes		71,051	97.8	
Informal votes		1,575	2.2	
Turnout		72,626	84.3	
Two-party-preferred result
Liberal	Peter White	46,336	65.2	+11.6
National Country	Glen Sheil	24,715	34.8	+34.8
Liberal hold		Swing	+11.6	

==== 1980 ====
1980 Australian federal election: McPherson
Party	Candidate	Votes	%	±%
Liberal	Eric Robinson	32,459	43.3	−16.8
Labor	Walter Ehrich	23,061	30.8	+3.2
Independent	Louis Rowan	14,350	19.1	+19.1
Democrats	Ian Crick	3,761	5.0	−4.2
Independent	William Aabraham-Steer	1,339	1.8	+0.3
Total formal votes		74,970	97.7	
Informal votes		1,778	2.3	
Turnout		76,748	92.7	
Two-party-preferred result
Liberal	Eric Robinson	40,170	53.6	−12.7
Labor	Walter Ehrich	34,800	46.4	+12.7
Liberal hold		Swing	−12.7	

=== Elections in the 1970s ===
==== 1977 ====
1977 Australian federal election: McPherson
Party	Candidate	Votes	%	±%
Liberal	Eric Robinson	37,962	60.1	−4.3
Labor	Jon Guerson	17,419	27.6	−4.5
Democrats	Leonard Fairman	5,819	9.2	+9.2
Independent	William Aabraham-Steer	964	1.5	+1.5
Progress	Neva Maxim	951	1.5	−2.0
Total formal votes		63,115	98.2	
Informal votes		1,138	1.8	
Turnout		64,253	94.5	
Two-party-preferred result
Liberal	Eric Robinson		66.3	−0.1
Labor	Jon Guerson		33.7	+0.1
Liberal hold		Swing	−0.1	

==== 1975 ====
1975 Australian federal election: McPherson
Party	Candidate	Votes	%	±%
Liberal	Eric Robinson	61,455	64.4	+7.8
Labor	Brian Paterson	30,644	32.1	−7.2
Workers	Coral Finlay	3,378	3.5	+3.5
Total formal votes		95,477	98.8	
Informal votes		1,152	1.2	
Turnout		96,629	94.6	
Two-party-preferred result
Liberal	Eric Robinson		66.4	+7.6
Labor	Brian Paterson		33.6	−7.6
Liberal hold		Swing	+7.6	

==== 1974 ====
1974 Australian federal election: McPherson
Party	Candidate	Votes	%	±%
Liberal	Eric Robinson	47,496	56.6	+30.2
Labor	Tom Veivers	33,001	39.3	−1.5
Australia	Robert Richardson	3,427	4.1	+1.1
Total formal votes		83,924	98.8	
Informal votes		1,046	1.2	
Turnout		84,970	95.3	
Two-party-preferred result
Liberal	Eric Robinson		58.8	+4.1
Labor	Tom Veivers		41.2	−4.1
Liberal hold		Swing	+4.1	

==== 1972 ====
1972 Australian federal election: McPherson
Party	Candidate	Votes	%	±%
Labor	Tom Veivers	27,180	40.8	+3.7
Liberal	Eric Robinson	17,571	26.4	+26.4
Country	Howard Richter	16,949	25.5	−28.7
Australia	Robert Richardson	2,009	3.0	+3.0
Democratic Labor	Victor Kearney	1,978	3.0	−5.7
Independent	John Black	753	1.1	+1.1
Independent	James Drabsch	120	0.2	+0.2
Total formal votes		66,560	97.2	
Informal votes		1,903	2.8	
Turnout		68,463	95.0	
Two-party-preferred result
Liberal	Eric Robinson	36,415	54.7	+54.7
Labor	Tom Veivers	30,145	45.3	+6.5
Liberal gain from Country		Swing	−6.5	

=== Elections in the 1960s ===
==== 1969 ====
1969 Australian federal election: McPherson
Party	Candidate	Votes	%	±%
Country	Charles Barnes	26,691	54.2	−9.0
Labor	Wayne Randall	18,310	37.1	+9.0
Democratic Labor	Thomas McKenzie	4,287	8.7	+3.9
Total formal votes		49,288	98.6	
Informal votes		694	1.4	
Turnout		49,982	93.3	
Two-party-preferred result
Country	Charles Barnes		61.2	−7.8
Labor	Wayne Randall		38.8	+7.8
Country hold		Swing	−7.8	

==== 1966 ====
1966 Australian federal election: McPherson
Party	Candidate	Votes	%	±%
Country	Charles Barnes	39,271	59.5	+1.4
Labor	Allan Swinton	21,001	31.8	−5.8
Democratic Labor	Frederick Burges	3,137	4.8	+0.5
Independent	Harold Brennan	2,578	3.9	+3.9
Total formal votes		65,987	97.8	
Informal votes		1,465	2.2	
Turnout		67,452	94.8	
Two-party-preferred result
Country	Charles Barnes		65.3	+3.8
Labor	Allan Swinton		34.7	−3.8
Country hold		Swing	+3.8	

==== 1963 ====
1963 Australian federal election: McPherson
Party	Candidate	Votes	%	±%
Country	Charles Barnes	33,422	58.1	+4.3
Labor	Gerry Jones	21,657	37.6	+0.6
Democratic Labor	Michael O'Connor	2,481	4.3	−2.2
Total formal votes		57,560	97.7	
Informal votes		1,347	2.3	
Turnout		58,907	94.8	
Two-party-preferred result
Country	Charles Barnes		61.5	+1.1
Labor	Gerry Jones		38.5	−1.1
Country hold		Swing	+1.1	

==== 1961 ====
1961 Australian federal election: McPherson
Party	Candidate	Votes	%	±%
Country	Charles Barnes	28,076	53.8	−9.3
Labor	William Ware	19,293	37.0	+9.6
Queensland Labor	John O'Connell	3,406	6.5	−3.0
Independent	Allen Kirkegaard	797	1.5	+1.5
Independent	Thomas Masterson	624	1.2	+1.2
Total formal votes		52,196	96.9	
Informal votes		1,691	3.1	
Turnout		53,887	94.1	
Two-party-preferred result
Country	Charles Barnes		60.4	−10.3
Labor	William Ware		39.6	+10.3
Country hold		Swing	−10.3	

=== Elections in the 1950s ===
==== 1958 ====
1958 Australian federal election: McPherson
Party	Candidate	Votes	%	±%
Country	Charles Barnes	29,346	63.1	+3.6
Labor	Harold Evans	12,730	27.4	−1.9
Queensland Labor	John Hilton	4,413	9.5	+9.5
Total formal votes		46,489	97.5	
Informal votes		1,202	2.5	
Turnout		47,691	94.1	
Two-party-preferred result
Country	Charles Barnes		70.7	+5.6
Labor	Harold Evans		29.3	−5.6
Country hold		Swing	+5.6	

==== 1955 ====
1955 Australian federal election: McPherson
Party	Candidate	Votes	%	±%
Country	Sir Arthur Fadden	24,269	59.5	−4.9
Labor	David Clarke	11,942	29.3	+29.3
Independent	Thomas Green	4,555	11.2	+11.2
Total formal votes		40,766	97.7	
Informal votes		946	2.3	
Turnout		41,712	94.3	
Two-party-preferred result
Country	Sir Arthur Fadden		65.1	−0.2
Labor	David Clarke		34.9	+34.9
Country hold		Swing	−0.2	

==== 1954 ====
1954 Australian federal election: McPherson
Party	Candidate	Votes	%	±%
Country	Sir Arthur Fadden	22,397	65.3	−9.6
Independent Democrat	Sir Raphael Cilento	11,905	34.7	+34.7
Total formal votes		34,302	99.0	
Informal votes		350	1.0	
Turnout		34,652	96.1	
Country hold		Swing	−9.6	

==== 1951 ====
1951 Australian federal election: McPherson
Party	Candidate	Votes	%	±%
Country	Arthur Fadden	24,899	74.9	+0.7
Independent	John Rosser	8,338	25.1	+25.1
Total formal votes		33,237	97.8	
Informal votes		747	2.2	
Turnout		33,984	96.4	
Country hold		Swing	+0.7	

=== Elections in the 1940s ===
==== 1949 ====
1949 Australian federal election: McPherson
Party	Candidate	Votes	%	±%
Country	Arthur Fadden	24,263	74.2	+46.6
Labor	John Hilton	8,436	25.8	−5.1
Total formal votes		32,699	98.4	
Informal votes		521	1.6	
Turnout		33,220	94.0	
Country notional gain from Liberal		Swing	+5.1	
