= Members of the Australian House of Representatives, 1980–1983 =

This is a list of members of the Australian House of Representatives from 1980 to 1983, as elected at the 1980 federal election.

Member	Party	Electorate	State	In office
Evan Adermann	National	Fisher	Qld	1972–1990
Doug Anthony	National	Richmond	NSW	1957–1984
John Armitage	Labor	Chifley	NSW	1961–1963, 1969–1983
Michael Baume	Liberal	Macarthur	NSW	1975–1983
Kim Beazley	Labor	Swan	WA	1980–2007
Jack Birney	Liberal	Phillip	NSW	1975–1983
Neal Blewett	Labor	Bonython	SA	1977–1994
Lionel Bowen	Labor	Kingsford-Smith	NSW	1969–1990
John Bourchier	Liberal	Bendigo	Vic	1972–1983
Jim Bradfield	Liberal	Barton	NSW	1975–1983
Ray Braithwaite	National	Dawson	Qld	1975–1996
Bob Brown	Labor	Hunter	NSW	1980–1998
John Brown	Labor	Parramatta	NSW	1977–1990
Neil Brown	Liberal	Diamond Valley	Vic	1969–1972, 1975–1991
Mel Bungey	Liberal	Canning	WA	1974–1983
Max Burr	Liberal	Wilmot	Tas	1975–1993
Alan Cadman	Liberal	Mitchell	NSW	1974–2007
Don Cameron	Liberal	Fadden	Qld	1966–1990
Ewen Cameron	Liberal	Indi	Vic	1977–1993
Ian Cameron	National	Maranoa	Qld	1980–1990
Graeme Campbell	Labor	Kalgoorlie	WA	1980–1998
Jim Carlton	Liberal	Mackellar	NSW	1977–1994
Moss Cass	Labor	Maribyrnong	Vic	1969–1983
David Charles	Labor	Isaacs	Vic	1980–1990
Grant Chapman	Liberal	Kingston	SA	1975–1983
Joan Child	Labor	Henty	Vic	1974–1975, 1980–1990
Barry Cohen	Labor	Robertson	NSW	1969–1990
Peter Coleman ^{4}	Liberal	Wentworth	NSW	1981–1987
David Connolly	Liberal	Bradfield	NSW	1974–1996
Bruce Cowan	National	Lyne	NSW	1980–1993
Manfred Cross	Labor	Brisbane	Qld	1961–1975, 1980–1990
Barry Cunningham	Labor	McMillan	Vic	1980–1990, 1993–1996
Elaine Darling	Labor	Lilley	Qld	1980–1993
John Dawkins	Labor	Fremantle	WA	1974–1975, 1977–1994
Gordon Dean	Liberal	Herbert	Qld	1977–1983
Don Dobie	Liberal	Cook	NSW	1966–1972, 1975–1996
Peter Drummond	Liberal	Forrest	WA	1972–1987
Michael Duffy	Labor	Holt	Vic	1980–1996
Harry Edwards	Liberal	Berowra	NSW	1972–1993
Bob Ellicott ^{4}	Liberal	Wentworth	NSW	1974–1981
Doug Everingham	Labor	Capricornia	Qld	1967–1975, 1977–1984
Peter Falconer	Liberal	Casey	Vic	1975–1983
Wal Fife	Liberal	Farrer	NSW	1975–1993
Peter Fisher	National	Mallee	Vic	1972–1993
Malcolm Fraser	Liberal	Wannon	Vic	1955–1984
Ross Free	Labor	Macquarie	NSW	1980–1996
Ken Fry	Labor	Fraser	ACT	1974–1984
Victor Garland ^{3}	Liberal	Curtin	WA	1969–1981
Geoffrey Giles	Liberal	Wakefield	SA	1964–1983
Bruce Goodluck	Liberal	Franklin	Tas	1975–1993
Ray Groom	Liberal	Braddon	Tas	1975–1984
Steele Hall ^{2}	Liberal	Boothby	SA	1981–1996
Graham Harris	Liberal	Chisholm	Vic	1980–1983
Bob Hawke	Labor	Wills	Vic	1980–1992
Bill Hayden	Labor	Oxley	Qld	1961–1988
Noel Hicks	National	Riverina	NSW	1980–1998
John Hodges	Liberal	Petrie	Qld	1974–1983, 1984–1987
Michael Hodgman	Liberal	Denison	Tas	1975–1987
Clyde Holding	Labor	Melbourne Ports	Vic	1977–1998
John Howard	Liberal	Bennelong	NSW	1974–2007
Brian Howe	Labor	Batman	Vic	1977–1996
Ben Humphreys	Labor	Griffith	Qld	1977–1996
Ralph Hunt	National	Gwydir	NSW	1969–1989
Chris Hurford	Labor	Adelaide	SA	1969–1988
John Hyde	Liberal	Moore	WA	1974–1983
Ted Innes	Labor	Melbourne	Vic	1972–1983
Ralph Jacobi	Labor	Hawker	SA	1969–1987
Alan Jarman	Liberal	Deakin	Vic	1966–1983
Harry Jenkins Sr.	Labor	Scullin	Vic	1969–1985
Les Johnson	Labor	Hughes	NSW	1955–1966, 1969–1984
Barry Jones	Labor	Lalor	Vic	1977–1998
Charles Jones	Labor	Newcastle	NSW	1958–1983
David Jull	Liberal	Bowman	Qld	1975–1983, 1984–2007
Bob Katter Sr.	National	Kennedy	Qld	1966–1990
Paul Keating	Labor	Blaxland	NSW	1969–1996
Ros Kelly	Labor	Canberra	ACT	1980–1995
Lewis Kent	Labor	Hotham	Vic	1980–1990
John Kerin	Labor	Werriwa	NSW	1972–1975, 1978–1994
James Killen	Liberal	Moreton	Qld	1955–1983
Dick Klugman	Labor	Prospect	NSW	1969–1990
Bruce Lloyd	National	Murray	Vic	1971–1996
Stephen Lusher	National	Hume	NSW	1974–1984
Phillip Lynch ^{6}	Liberal	Flinders	Vic	1966–1982
Michael MacKellar	Liberal	Warringah	NSW	1969–1994
Sandy Mackenzie	National	Calare	NSW	1975–1983
Ian Macphee	Liberal	Balaclava	Vic	1974–1990
Michael Maher ^{5}	Labor	Lowe	NSW	1982–1987
Ross McLean	Liberal	Perth	WA	1975–1983
John McLeay Jr. ^{2}	Liberal	Boothby	SA	1966–1981
Leo McLeay	Labor	Grayndler	NSW	1979–2004
Les McMahon	Labor	Sydney	NSW	1975–1983
Sir William McMahon ^{5}	Liberal	Lowe	NSW	1949–1982
Tom McVeigh	National	Darling Downs	Qld	1972–1988
John Mildren	Labor	Ballarat	Vic	1980–1990
Clarrie Millar	National	Wide Bay	Qld	1974–1990
Peter Milton	Labor	La Trobe	Vic	1980–1990
John Moore	Liberal	Ryan	Qld	1975–2001
Peter Morris	Labor	Shortland	NSW	1972–1998
Bill Morrison	Labor	St George	NSW	1969–1975, 1980–1984
John Mountford	Labor	Banks	NSW	1980–1990
Kevin Newman	Liberal	Bass	Tas	1975–1984
Peter Nixon	National	Gippsland	Vic	1961–1983
Frank O'Keefe	National	Paterson	NSW	1969–1984
Andrew Peacock	Liberal	Kooyong	Vic	1966–1994
James Porter	Liberal	Barker	SA	1975–1990
Peter Reith ^{6}	Liberal	Flinders	Vic	1982–1983, 1984–2001
Eric Robinson ^{1}	Liberal	McPherson	Qld	1972–1990
Ian Robinson	National	Cowper	NSW	1963–1981
Allan Rocher ^{3}	Liberal	Curtin	WA	1981–1998
Philip Ruddock	Liberal	Dundas	NSW	1973–2016
Murray Sainsbury	Liberal	Eden-Monaro	NSW	1975–1983
Gordon Scholes	Labor	Corio	Vic	1967–1993
John Scott	Labor	Hindmarsh	SA	1980–1993
Peter Shack	Liberal	Tangney	WA	1977–1983, 1984–1993
Roger Shipton	Liberal	Higgins	Vic	1975–1990
Ian Sinclair	National	New England	NSW	1963–1998
Sir Billy Snedden	Liberal	Bruce	Vic	1955–1983
John Spender	Liberal	North Sydney	NSW	1980–1990
Tony Street	Liberal	Corangamite	Vic	1966–1984
Grant Tambling	Country Liberal	Northern Territory	NT	1980–1983
Andrew Theophanous	Labor	Burke	Vic	1980–2001
David Thomson	National	Leichhardt	Qld	1975–1983
Wilson Tuckey	Liberal	O'Connor	WA	1980–2010
Tom Uren	Labor	Reid	NSW	1958–1990
Ian Viner	Liberal	Stirling	WA	1972–1983
Laurie Wallis	Labor	Grey	SA	1969–1983
Stewart West	Labor	Cunningham	NSW	1977–1993
Peter White ^{1}	Liberal	McPherson	Qld	1981–1990
Ralph Willis	Labor	Gellibrand	Vic	1972–1998
Ian Wilson	Liberal	Sturt	SA	1966–1969, 1972–1993
Mick Young	Labor	Port Adelaide	SA	1974–1988

^{1} Liberal member Eric Robinson died on 7 January 1981; Liberal candidate Peter White won the resulting by-election on 21 February 1981.
^{2} Liberal member John McLeay Jr. resigned on 22 January 1981; Liberal candidate Steele Hall won the resulting by-election on 21 February 1981.
^{3} Liberal member Victor Garland resigned on 22 January 1981; Liberal candidate Allan Rocher won the resulting by-election on 21 February 1981.
^{4} Liberal member Bob Ellicott resigned on 17 February 1981; Liberal candidate Peter Coleman won the resulting by-election on 11 April 1981.
^{5} Liberal member Sir William McMahon resigned on 4 January 1982; Labor candidate Michael Maher won the resulting by-election on 13 March 1982.
^{6} Liberal member Sir Phillip Lynch resigned on 22 October 1982; Liberal candidate Peter Reith won the resulting by-election on 4 December 1982.
