= List of elections in 1981 =

The following elections occurred in the year 1981.

== Africa ==
- 1981 Burundian constitutional referendum
- 1981 Central African constitutional referendum
- 1981 Central African Republic presidential election
- 1981 Djiboutian presidential election
- 1981 Egyptian presidential confirmation referendum
- 1981 Rwandan parliamentary election
- 1981 South African general election
- 1981–82 Sudanese parliamentary election
- 1981 Tunisian parliamentary election

== Asia ==
- 1981 Bangladeshi presidential election
- 1981 Burmese general election
- 1981 Cambodian general election
- 1981 Cypriot legislative election
- July 1981 Iranian presidential election
- October 1981 Iranian presidential election
- Israeli legislative election
- 1981 Kuwaiti general election
- 1981 Mongolian parliamentary election
- Nepalese Rastriya Panchayat election
- 1981 North Korean local elections
- 1981 Philippine presidential election and referendum
- 1981 Singaporean presidential election
- 1981 South Korean legislative election
- South Korean presidential election
- 1981 Syrian parliamentary election
- 1981 Taiwanese local elections
- 1981 Vietnamese legislative election

== Europe ==
- 1981 Andorran parliamentary election
- 1981 Belgian general election
- 1981 Bulgarian parliamentary election
- 1981 Czechoslovak parliamentary election
- 1981 East German general election
- 1981 Danish local elections
- 1981 Danish parliamentary election
- 1981 Dutch general election
- 1981 Greek legislative election
- 1981 Irish general election
- 1981 Italian referendums
- 1981 Liechtenstein constitutional referendum
- 1981 Maltese general election
- 1981 Northern Cypriot general election
- 1981 Norwegian parliamentary election
- 1981 Slovak parliamentary election
- 1981 Swiss referendums

=== European Parliament ===
- European Parliament election, 1981 (Greece)

=== France ===
- 1981 French legislative election
- 1981 French presidential election

== North America ==
- 1981 Honduran general election

=== Canada ===
- 1981 Edmonton municipal plebiscite
- 1981 Manitoba general election
- 1981 Nova Scotia general election
- 1981 Ontario general election
- 1981 Quebec general election

=== Caribbean ===
- 1981 Anguillan general election
- 1981 Barbadian general election
- 1981 Cuban parliamentary election
- 1981 Trinidad and Tobago general election

=== United States ===
- 1981 United States elections

==== United States lieutenant gubernatorial ====
- 1981 Virginia lieutenant gubernatorial election

==== United States gubernatorial ====
- 1981 New Jersey gubernatorial election
- 1981 United States gubernatorial elections
- 1981 Virginia gubernatorial election

==== United States House of Representatives ====
- 1981 United States House of Representatives elections
- 1981 Maryland's 5th congressional district special election
- 1981 Michigan's 4th congressional district special election
- 1981 Ohio's 4th congressional district special election
- 1981 Pennsylvania's 3rd congressional district special election

==== United States mayoral elections ====
- 1981 Allentown mayoral election
- 1981 Anchorage mayoral election
- 1981 Atlanta mayoral election
- 1981 Buffalo mayoral election
- 1981 Burlington, Vermont mayoral election
- 1981 Cleveland mayoral election
- 1981 Durham mayoral election
- 1981 Hartford mayoral election
- 1981 Los Angeles mayoral election
- 1981 Manchester, New Hampshire, mayoral election
- 1981 New York City mayoral election
- 1981 Pittsburgh mayoral election
- 1981 Springfield, Massachusetts mayoral election
- 1981 St. Louis mayoral election

== Oceania ==
- 1981 Micronesian general election
- 1981 New Zealand general election
- 1981 Tongan general election
- 1981 Tuvaluan general election

=== Australia ===
- Boothby by-election
- Cessnock state by-election
- Curtin by-election
- MacDonnell by-election
- Maitland state by-election
- McPherson by-election
- Millner by-election
- New South Wales state election
- Oxley state by-election
- Sturt state by-election
- Tasmanian power referendum
- Wentworth by-election

== South America ==
=== Falkland Islands ===
- 1981 Falkland Islands general election
