= Electoral results for the district of Westernport =

Australian district election results

This is a list of electoral results for the electoral district of Westernport in Victorian state elections.

== Members for Westernport ==
Member	Party	Term
Doug Jennings	Liberal/Independent	1976–1979
Alan Brown	Liberal	1979–1985

== Election results ==
=== Elections in the 1980s ===
1982 Victorian state election: Westernport
Party	Candidate	Votes	%	±%
Liberal	Alan Brown	15,126	47.9	+14.4
Labor	Russell Joiner	13,153	41.6	+9.2
Independent	Lester Wyatt	1,944	6.2	+6.2
Democrats	Leslie Reubens	1,372	4.3	−0.6
Total formal votes		31,595	98.3	+0.6
Informal votes		546	1.7	−0.6
Turnout		32,141	93.4	−0.3
Two-party-preferred result
Liberal	Alan Brown	17,027	53.9	−6.0
Labor	Russell Joiner	14,568	46.1	+6.0
Liberal hold		Swing	−6.0	

=== Elections in the 1970s ===
1979 Victorian state election: Westernport
Party	Candidate	Votes	%	±%
Liberal	Alan Brown	9,589	33.5	−12.7
Labor	Russell Joiner	9,271	32.4	+0.3
Independent	Doug Jennings	6,819	23.8	+23.8
National	Lawrence Wintle	1,574	5.5	−12.7
Democrats	Ronald Bowman	1,404	4.9	+4.9
Total formal votes		28,657	97.7	−0.4
Informal votes		684	2.3	+0.4
Turnout		29,341	93.7	+0.4
Two-party-preferred result
Liberal	Alan Brown	17,172	59.9	−6.4
Labor	Russell Joiner	11,485	40.1	+6.4
Liberal hold		Swing	−6.4	

1976 Victorian state election: Westernport
Party	Candidate	Votes	%	±%
Liberal	Doug Jennings	11,237	46.2	−1.6
Labor	John Daley	7,812	32.1	−0.3
National	Michael Woods	4,429	18.2	+5.0
Democratic Labor	Kevin Leydon	866	3.6	−3.0
Total formal votes		24,344	98.1	
Informal votes		462	1.9	
Turnout		24,806	93.3	
Two-party-preferred result
Liberal	Doug Jennings	16,146	66.3	+1.6
Labor	John Daley	8,198	33.7	−1.6
Liberal hold		Swing	+1.6	
