= Glen Sheil =

Australian politician (1929–2008)

Executive Councillor without portfolio
- In office 20 December 1977 – 21 December 1977
- Preceded by: Peter Durack
- Succeeded by: Victor Garland

Senator for Queensland
- In office 18 May 1974 – 6 February 1981
- Succeeded by: Florence Bjelke-Petersen
- In office 1 December 1984 – 30 June 1990

Personal details
- Born: 21 October 1929 Sydney, New South Wales, Australia
- Died: 29 September 2008 (aged 78) Brisbane, Queensland, Australia
- Party: National Party of Australia
- Spouse(s): Marjorie Sword (m. 1955; died 1989) Elizabeth Anderson (m. 1991)
- Education: University of Queensland
- Occupation: Medical practitioner
- Tennis career
- Full name: Glenister Fermoy Sheil
- Country (sports): Australia

Grand Slam singles results
- Australian Open: 1R (1949, 1950, 1952, 1956)

Grand Slam doubles results
- Australian Open: 2R (1949)

Glenister Fermoy Sheil (21 October 1929 – 29 September 2008) was an Australian politician, representing the National Party in the Senate for the state of Queensland from 1974 to 1981, and again from 1984–90. He was an amateur tennis player who competed at the Australian Championships in the 1940s and 1950s.

== Early life ==
Sheil was born in Sydney on 21 October 1929. He was the second of five children born to Agnes May (née Browne) and William Glenister Sheil. His father was a civil engineer who worked in several states and was appointed general manager of Queensland's Mount Morgan Mine in 1950. He was the Country Party candidate at the 1967 Capricornia by-election.

Sheil moved frequently during his childhood, attending Silverton Provisional School in Brisbane, Benalla High School in country Victoria, The Hutchins School in Hobart, and The Southport School on the Gold Coast. He went on to study medicine at the University of Queensland, graduating MBBS in 1954.

After graduating from university, Sheil established a medical practice in Auchenflower. He subsequently purchased the Fermoy Private Hospital, a small private hospital which was expanded to include a medical centre and pharmacy. He later also acquired Dungarvan Private Hospital in Toowong.

== Politics ==
He was elected to the Senate at the 1974 election, taking his seat immediately on 18 May because the election followed a double dissolution. In an early parliamentary speech, he read the Lord's Prayer in nine South African languages. He was re-elected in 1975, also a double dissolution.

After the 1977 election, Malcolm Fraser announced the make-up of the new ministry that he would be recommending to the Governor-General. Sheil was to be Minister for Veterans' Affairs. He was then sworn into the Federal Executive Council, the body that formally advises the Governor-General on governmental matters. The announcement was made at 5 pm on 19 December 1977.

The next morning a story appeared in the Melbourne Sun News Pictorial where Sheil professed his support for apartheid. The story, based on an interview with journalist Niki Savva, also quoted Sheil saying he would support apartheid in Australia.

In the ensuing furore over the story, Fraser decided not to proceed with Sheil's appointment to the ministry. In a very rare move, he advised the Governor-General, Sir Zelman Cowen, to terminate Sheil's appointment as an Executive Councillor (such appointments are normally for life). Cowen was required by convention to act on the Prime Minister's advice, and the termination occurred at midday on 21 December. This also had the effect of stripping him of the title "Honourable", which he would otherwise have held for life.

This was widely described as "the shortest ministerial career in Australia's history". In fact, Sheil was never a minister at all, but he was a member of the Executive Council for two days. He became the only person to be announced in a Ministry who never made it as a minister.

On 6 February 1981 he resigned from the Senate to contest a by-election for the House of Representatives seat of McPherson. He was defeated by Liberal Party candidate Peter White. The casual vacancy caused by his resignation was filled by Florence Bjelke-Petersen, the wife of the then-Premier of Queensland, Joh Bjelke-Petersen.

At the 1984 election on 1 December, he was re-elected to the Senate, again taking his seat immediately because the Senate was being increased from 64 to 76 members. He was defeated at the 1990 election, his term expiring on 30 June 1990.

== Other ==
Sheil led the joint Australian Monarchist League (AML) and Queenslanders for Constitutional Monarchy (QCM) ticket in the campaign to send candidates to the Australian Constitutional Convention 1998 which was held in Canberra from 2–13 February in that year.

Active in tennis, rugby and cricket in Queensland, he was known as "Thumpa", a nickname from a rabbit-farming company he part-owned.

== Personal life ==
In 1955, Sheil married a fellow doctor, Marjorie Sword. He was widowed in 1989 and remarried in 1991 to Elizabeth Anderson, the daughter of former Country MP Charles Anderson.

Sheil died on 29 September 2008, aged 78.

== Bibliography ==
- Footnotes to History (3 vols.)
- A Companion to the Australian Constitution on Understanding the Constitution.
