= 1981 Swiss referendums =

Four referendums were held in Switzerland in 1981. The first was held on 5 April on a popular initiative "for a new policy on foreigners." Known as the "Mitenand Initiative", it was rejected by 84% of voters. The next two referendums were held on 14 June on popular initiatives for gender equality and the protection of consumer rights, both of which were approved. The final referendum was held on 29 November on prolonging the federal finance order, and was also approved.

== Results ==
=== April: New policy on foreigners ===
Choice	Popular vote		Cantons		
Choice	Votes	%	Full	Half	Total
For	252,531	16.2	0	0	0
Against	1,304,153	83.8	20	6	23
Blank votes	15,524	–	–	–	–
Invalid votes	2,292	–	–	–	–
Total	1,574,500	100	20	6	23
Registered voters/turnout	3,947,890	39.9	–	–	–
Source: Nohlen & Stöver

=== June: Gender equality ===
Choice	Popular vote		Cantons		
Choice	Votes	%	Full	Half	Total
For	797,702	60.3	14	3	15.5
Against	525,885	39.7	6	3	7.5
Blank votes	17,312	–	–	–	–
Invalid votes	2,702	–	–	–	–
Total	1,343,601	100	20	6	23
Registered voters/turnout	3,958,455	33.9	–	–	–
Source: Nohlen & Stöver

=== June: Consumer protection ===
Choice	Popular vote		Cantons		
Choice	Votes	%	Full	Half	Total
For	858,012	65.5	18	4	20
Against	450,994	34.5	2	2	3
Blank votes	29,949	–	–	–	–
Invalid votes	2,605	–	–	–	–
Total	1,341,560	100	20	6	23
Registered voters/turnout	3,958,455	33.9	–	–	–
Source: Nohlen & Stöver

=== November: Financial order ===
Choice	Popular vote		Cantons		
Choice	Votes	%	Full	Half	Total
For	818,327	69.0	20	6	23
Against	368,508	31.0	0	0	0
Blank votes	18,598	–	–	–	–
Invalid votes	1,616	–	–	–	–
Total	1,207,049	100	20	6	23
Registered voters/turnout	3,976,769	30.4	–	–	–
Source: Nohlen & Stöver
