= Federal Executive Council (Australia) =

Body advising the governor-general of Australia

- Commonwealth Coat of Arms

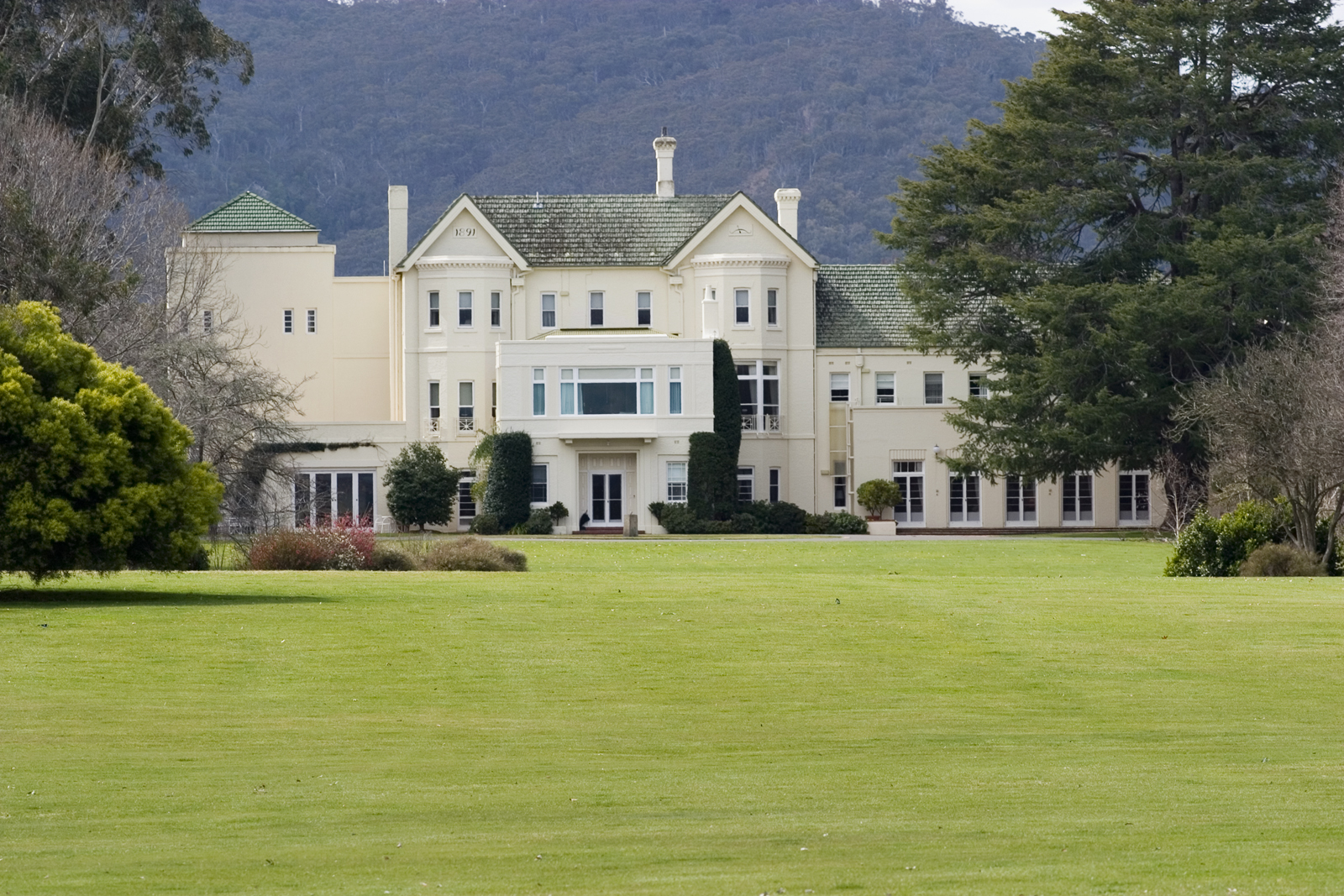
- Government House, Canberra

Council overview
- Formed: 1901
- Jurisdiction: Commonwealth of Australia
- Headquarters: Government House, Canberra
- Council executive: Katy Gallagher, Vice-President of the Executive Council

The Federal Executive Council is a body established by section 62 of the Australian Constitution to advise the governor-general of Australia on the matters of the federal government. The council notionally comprises all current and former Commonwealth ministers and assistant ministers; in practice, however, it only includes the Governor-General and current government ministers. As the Governor-General is bound by convention to follow the advice of the Executive Council on almost all occasions, the Executive Council has de facto executive power. In practice, this power is used to legally enact the decisions already made by the Federal Cabinet, due to the practices of the Westminster system making the cabinet a de facto authority in its own right.

There are some laws that specifically require decisions or actions to be made by the "Governor-General in Council", which means that they must be effected by the Governor-General on the advice of the Federal Executive Council, as opposed to by a minister acting alone. The matters that are typically required to be dealt with by the Governor-General in Council include:

- the making of regulations
- appointing, renewing and removing statutory officers
- appointing judges
- determining the appropriate use of Crown land
- issuing proclamations.

The Australian Federal Executive Council is the equivalent of executive councils in other Commonwealth realms, and is similar to the privy councils of Canada and the United Kingdom (although unlike the UK privy council, the Leader of the Opposition is not typically a member).

== Composition ==
The Australian Federal Executive Council formally consists of all current and former Commonwealth Ministers and Assistant Ministers (previously called parliamentary secretaries). Members of the Executive Council are referred to as Councillors and are entitled to the style 'The Honourable' for life. Section 64 of the Constitution stipulates that when a Minister is appointed, that Minister shall also become a member of the Executive Council. There is no provision for such membership to come to an end, but only those Ministers in the current ministry who are invited to take part in meetings are in practice actually involved in Council activities.

The Governor-General presides over meetings of the Executive Council but is not a member. A member of the Cabinet is appointed to hold the position of Vice-President of the Executive Council to act as presiding officer of the Executive Council in the absence of the Governor-General, at no additional salary or allowance. However, the vice-president cannot sign Executive Council documents on behalf of the Governor-General.

The Governor-General has the power to dismiss any member of the Executive Council, but that power is rarely exercised in practice. It might be exercised if, hypothetically, a minister or former minister were convicted of a serious criminal offence. One notable case was that of the Queensland Senator Glen Sheil. Malcolm Fraser's government was re-elected at the 1977 election on 10 December, and on 19 December he publicly announced the ministry he would be recommending to the Governor-General, which included Senator Sheil as the new Minister for Veterans' Affairs. Sheil was sworn in as an Executive Councillor but, prior to the scheduled swearing-in of the Ministry, he made public statements about apartheid that were at odds with the government's attitude to the issue. Fraser then advised Governor-General Sir Zelman Cowen not to include Sheil in the ministry—advice that Cowen was required by convention to follow. Sheil's appointment as an Executive Councillor without portfolio was terminated on 22 December.

== Meetings ==
Meetings of the Executive Council do not require the Governor-General's attendance, but the Governor-General must be notified of the meeting in order for it to be valid. A quorum for meetings is the Governor-General and two serving ministers or assistant ministers. If the Governor-General is not in attendance, quorum is the vice-president and two serving ministers or assistant ministers. In the absence of the vice-president, quorum is three ministers, one of whom, a senior minister, will preside. In practice, meetings will only be attended by a small number of Councillors rather than the full Cabinet.

Most of the powers vested in the Governor-General, such as appointments and the authorisation of budgets, are exercisable only by "the Governor-General in Council" – that is, under advice from the Federal Executive Council. The Council acts as a formal ratification body for decisions of the Cabinet. In a parallel manner to the Royal Assent given to legislative Acts by the Governor-General after they have passed both Houses of Parliament, proposed executive actions will receive the approval of the Governor-General in Council after they have been agreed to by the Prime Minister and Cabinet.

An example of a Federal Executive Council meeting which the Governor-General presided over was the meeting on 11 September 2022, when the Executive Council advised the Governor-General David Hurley to proclaim Charles III as the new head of state of Australia.

== See also ==
- Executive council (Commonwealth countries)
