= Charles Barnes (Australian politician) =

Australian politician (1901–1998)

The Honourable Charles Barnes
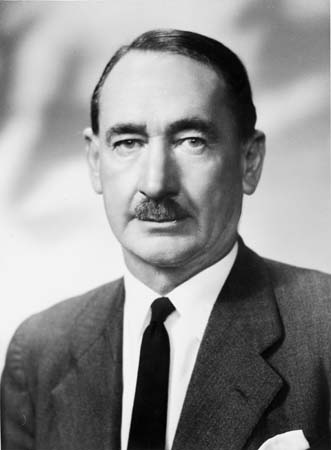

Minister for External Territories
- In office 28 February 1968 – 25 January 1972
- Prime Minister: John Gorton; William McMahon
- Preceded by: Himself (Territories)
- Succeeded by: Andrew Peacock

Minister for Territories
- In office 18 December 1963 – 28 February 1968
- Prime Minister: Robert Menzies; Harold Holt; John McEwen; John Gorton
- Preceded by: Paul Hasluck
- Succeeded by: Himself (External Territories)

Member of the Australian Parliament for McPherson
- In office 22 November 1958 – 2 November 1972
- Preceded by: Arthur Fadden
- Succeeded by: Eric Robinson

Personal details
- Born: 13 November 1901 Einasleigh, Queensland, Australia
- Died: 24 October 1998 (aged 96)
- Party: Country

Charles Edward "Ceb" Barnes (13 November 1901 – 24 October 1998) was an Australian politician. He was a member of the Country Party and served in the House of Representatives from 1958 to 1972. He was a long-serving government minister as Minister for Territories (1963–1968) and External Territories (1968–1972), holding office under five prime ministers.

== Early life and education ==
Charles Edward Barnes was born in Einasleigh, Queensland, to wealthy grazier and racehorse breeder J. H. S. Barnes and his wife Sarah, and raised at farms near Hughenden and Warwick, Queensland.

Educated in Sydney, Barnes left school at 17 to work for the Union Trustee Company. A cousin of Sir Michael Bruxner, a founder of the Country Party and its long-time leader in the New South Wales parliament, Barnes was also involved in the Country Party from a young age.

== Early career ==
Barnes formed a gold mining syndicate in 1939, re-opening two old mines, the Louisa and British Lion, on the abandoned Palmer Goldfield of North Queensland. Results were disappointing, and wartime fuel rationing closed the operation in 1941. Barnes enlisted in the Royal Australian Air Force on 9 November 1942, serving in Australia and New Guinea and reaching the rank of Flying Officer before his discharge on 13 September 1944. Following World War II, Barnes purchased Canning Downs station from his father and developed it into a successful thoroughbred horse breeding operation. Barnes also became heavily involved in the local community, serving as a committee member of the Queensland Turf Club and president of the Warwick Show and Rodeo Society.

Barnes found success on the racetrack, with one horse, Basha Felika, winning the 1951 Caulfield Cup and another, Tails, finishing third in the 1971 Melbourne Cup, and considered the second best galloper in the country, after Tulloch. During his parliamentary career, Barnes would credit his horses' success for his popularity with constituents.

== Politics ==
With the imminent retirement at the 1958 election of former Prime Minister Arthur Fadden as the member for McPherson, the Country Party sought Barnes as Fadden's replacement for the safe Country seat. Apparently hesitant at first, Barnes had to be cajoled to stand and left his campaign launch early, leaving Fadden to make his own way home.

Barnes was comfortably elected at the 1958 and 1961 elections and was appointed the Minister for External Territories (later renamed Minister for Territories) in the Menzies ministry in 1963. He was a member of Cabinet in the first Holt Ministry from January to December 1966. At the time, External Territories was one of the most powerful ministries as it had responsibility for Papua New Guinea, the Northern Territory and the Australian Capital Territory. In this role, Barnes helped shepherd Papua New Guinea towards independence and worked on Indigenous Australian issues.

He was appointed as a member of the Select Committee into the Grievances of the Yirrkala People, which was formed after the Yolngu people of Yirrkala mission had submitted the Yirrkala bark petitions to Parliament in August 1963. After the government failed to respond to the petition, granting bauxite mining leases to Nabalco on the Gove Peninsula in Arnhem Land without further consultation with the people, Barnes was appointed chairman of Nabalco's board.

By 1964 Barnes was considered the most likely successor to Country Party leader John McEwen, whose retirement from politics was thought to be imminent. As it was, McEwen continued as Country Party leader until 1971, including serving as Prime Minister of Australia following the death of Harold Holt.

== Later life ==
Barnes retired from parliament at the 1972 election and returned to managing Canning Downs, where he lived until his death in 1998, aged 96, survived by his wife Barbara, two daughters and one son. In recognition of his services to horseracing, The Ceb Barnes Plate is run at Eagle Farm Race Track each November in the lead-up to the Queensland Cup.

Commonly known as "Ceb" due to his initials, Barnes was described as "a rather big, solemn man with a heavy brown moustache and keen brown eyes" and represented the image of the quintessential Australian country gentleman.

Political offices
Preceded by Paul Hasluck	Minister for Territories; Minister for External Territories; 1963–1972	Succeeded by Andrew Peacock
Parliament of Australia
Preceded by Arthur Fadden	Member for McPherson; 1958–1972	Succeeded by Eric Robinson
