= Margaret May =

Australian politician from Queensland (born 1950)

Member of the Australian Parliament for McPherson
- In office 3 October 1998 – 19 July 2010
- Preceded by: John Bradford
- Succeeded by: Karen Andrews

Personal details
- Born: 30 June 1950 (age 76) Ba, Fiji
- Party: Liberal Party of Australia
- Occupation: Electorate secretary

Margaret Ann May (born 30 June 1950) is an Australian politician who was a Liberal Party of Australia member of the Australian House of Representatives from October 1998 to July 2010, representing McPherson, Queensland.

May was born in Ba, Fiji, and was educated at Seaforth TAFE College in Sydney. She was a financial administrator with the New South Wales Department of Education 1982–88 and an electorate secretary before entering politics.

May was elected to the seat of McPherson at the 1998 election. She defeated her Labor challenger local Councillor Eddy Saroff at the 2007 election and was subsequently appointed to the Outer Shadow Ministry as Shadow Minister for Ageing until the change in Liberal leadership in December 2009.

On 14 August 2009 she announced that she would retire at the 2010 federal election.

Parliament of Australia
Preceded by John Bradford	Member for McPherson; 1998–2010	Succeeded by Karen Andrews
