= 1981 Central African constitutional referendum =

- 2 February 1981

Results
Choice	Votes	%
Yes	837,410	98.55%
No	12,360	1.45%
Valid votes	849,770	98.90%
Invalid or blank votes	9,463	1.10%
Total votes	859,233	100.00%
Registered voters/turnout	928,800	92.51%

A constitutional referendum was held in the Central African Republic on 1 February 1981, following the overthrow of Jean-Bédel Bokassa in 1979. The new constitution would make the country a presidential republic with a unicameral National Assembly, as well as restoring multi-party democracy for the first time since 1962. It was approved by 98.55% of voters with a 92.53% turnout.

Following the referendum, presidential elections were held on 15 March. However, a military coup occurred on 1 September, before parliamentary elections could take place.

== Results ==
Choice	Votes	%
For	837,410	98.55
Against	12,360	1.45
Invalid/blank votes	9,463	–
Total	859,447	100
Registered voters/turnout	928,800	92.53
Source: African Elections Database
