= 1981 Curtin by-election =

A by-election was held for the Australian House of Representatives seat of Curtin on 21 February 1981. This was triggered by the resignation of Liberal MP Victor Garland in order to be appointed High Commissioner of Australia to the United Kingdom. It was held on the same day as by-elections for Boothby and McPherson.

The by-election was won by Liberal Allan Rocher, who had resigned from the Senate to contest it.

== Key dates ==
Date	Event
22 January 1981	Hon Victor Garland resigned from Parliament.
27 January 1981	The writ for the by-election was issued.
11 February 1981	Close of nominations.
21 February 1981	Polling day.
4 March 1981	The writ was returned and Allan Rocher was sworn in as the member for Curtin.
27 March 1981	The original deadline for the writ to be returned.
24 April 1981	Garland arrived in London to commence his duties as High Commissioner of Australia.

== Results ==
Curtin by-election, 1981
Party	Candidate	Votes	%	±%
Liberal	Allan Rocher	22,951	47.04	−11.88
Labor	John Crouch	15,644	32.06	−0.72
Democrats	Shirley de la Hunty	8,356	17.13	+8.83
Independent	Alfred Bussell	1,843	3.78	+3.78
Total formal votes		48,794	96.70	–1.15
Informal votes		1,664	3.30	+1.15
Turnout		50,458	78.21	–14.83
Two-party-preferred result
Liberal	Allan Rocher	27,062	55.46	−6.8
Labor	John Crouch	21,732	44.54	+6.8
Liberal hold		Swing	−6.8	
