= John Bradford (Australian politician) =

Australian politician (born 1946)

Member of the Australian Parliament for McPherson
- In office 24 March 1990 – 3 October 1998
- Preceded by: Peter White
- Succeeded by: Margaret May

Personal details
- Born: 3 January 1946 (age 80) Sydney
- Party: Liberal (1990–98); CDP (1998)
- Education: University of Sydney
- Occupation: Industry executive

John Walter Bradford (born 3 January 1946) is an Australian former politician.

Born in Sydney, he was educated at the University of Sydney and then Sydney College of Advanced Education, becoming a teacher. He served in the military 1968–1970, returning to become a retail industry executive.

== Politics ==
After moving to Queensland in 1987, Bradford was National Director of the Shopping Centre Tenants Association of Australia. He was active in local politics in Sydney, sitting on Warringah Shire Council (including two terms as Deputy Shire President) and the Mackellar County Council from 1977 to 1979 (Deputy Chair, 1979).

In 1990, he was elected to the Australian House of Representatives as the Liberal member for McPherson, Queensland. In 1992 he was one of a group of Coalition members of parliament who founded the Lyons Forum, a conservative ginger group.

On 7 April 1998, he resigned from the Liberal Party over Aboriginal rights and other issues. Thereafter sat as a member of the Christian Democratic Party. In the 1998 federal election, he contested the Senate seat in Queensland for the Christian Democrats, running with Kerry Blackman, an Aboriginal Christian businessman, but was not elected.

Bradford was endorsed by the Christian Democratic Party in 2000 as the successor to Elaine Nile in the New South Wales Legislative Council. However, as a result of an internal party dispute due to Bradford's residency, Nile delayed her retirement until 2002 and Gordon Moyes was ultimately appointed to the Council, ahead of Bradford.

== Church work ==
After Bradford's defeat in the 1998 federal election, he went to work for Mercy Ships, a Christian medical charity. Subsequently, he became the "Mission Development Director" for The Bible Society in Australia of Queensland, now part of the Bible Society Australia.

Civic offices
Preceded by Brian Green	Deputy Shire President of Warringah; 1982 – 1983	Succeeded by Kevin Begaud
Preceded by Brian Green	Deputy Shire President of Warringah; 1985	Vacant Council dismissed
Parliament of Australia
Preceded by Peter White	Member for McPherson; 1990 – 1998	Succeeded by Margaret May
