= Doug Jennings (politician) =

Australian politician and businessman

Douglas Jennings

Member of the Victorian Legislative Assembly for Westernport
- In office 20 March 1976 – 5 May 1979
- Preceded by: New seat
- Succeeded by: Alan Brown

Member of the Queensland Legislative Assembly for Southport
- In office 29 November 1980 – 9 April 1987
- Preceded by: Peter White
- Succeeded by: Mick Veivers

Personal details
- Born: Douglas Bernard Jennings; 30 October 1929 Melbourne, Victoria, Australia
- Died: 9 April 1987 (aged 57) Brisbane, Queensland, Australia
- Resting place: Flinders Cemetery
- Party: National Party
- Other political affiliations: Liberal Party, Independent
- Spouse(s): Patricia Downey (m.1953 Divorced 1980), Susan Frances Leister (m.1981 divorced 1984)
- Relations: John Jennings (uncle)
- Occupation: Cattle breeder

Douglas Bernard Jennings (30 October 1929 – 9 April 1987) was an Australian politician and businessman.

Born in Melbourne to Albert Victor Jennings, founder of the property development company A.V. Jennings, he left Melbourne Grammar School to join his father's firm in 1947, and worked in several areas of the organisation. In the late 1950s he became mostly involved in the Housing Division in Melbourne, but also encouraged the company to branch out into real estate and furnishings. When Jennings ran into hard times in the early 1960s, Doug Jennings came in for criticism and left the company.

After time spent in Queensland as the owner operator of the Mount Surprise Cattle station, he returned to Victoria and established a Brahman stud at Moorooduc. While there, he was elected as the Liberal Party member for the state seat of Westernport. He was expelled from the party in 1979 for his criticism of the government's handling of a land purchase scandal, and was defeated at the next election.

Jennings returned to Queensland where in 1980 he was elected National Party member for the state seat of Southport. An active sportsman in his youth, and always keen on maintaining his physical fitness, he ignored the signs of over-exertion and died of coronary heart disease on 9 April 1987, in the sauna of the gymnasium at Parliament House, Brisbane.

Doug Jennings was the nephew of John Jennings, United Australia Party member for the New South Wales federal seat of Watson.

Parliament of Victoria
Preceded by New seat	Member for Westernport; 1976 – 1979	Succeeded by Alan Brown
Parliament of Queensland
Preceded by Peter White	Member for Southport; 1980 – 1987	Succeeded by Mick Veivers
