= 1981 Buffalo mayoral election =

- November 4, 1981
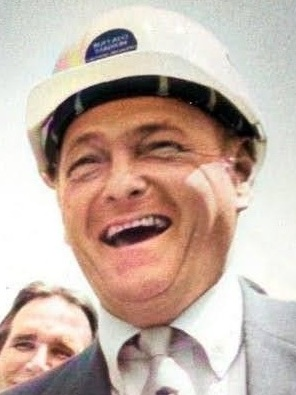

Nominee	Jimmy Griffin	Alfred Coppola
Party	Democratic	Liberal
Popular vote	72,361	7,869
Percentage	90.19%	9.81%
Mayor before election
Jimmy Griffin
Democratic
Elected mayor
Jimmy Griffin
Democratic

The Buffalo mayoral election of 1981 took place in Buffalo, New York, USA, on November 4, 1981, and resulted in the incumbent mayor Jimmy Griffin winning a second term over his opponent, the local politician Alfred Coppola, who ran on a minor party line.
