= Mitenand Initiative =

Rejected Swiss federal popular initiative

The Solidarity for a new policy on foreigners popular initiative (also known as the Mitenand Initiative) was a Swiss federal popular initiative, rejected by the voters and cantons on 5 April 1981.

== Content ==
The initiative calls for several amendments to Article 69th of the Federal Constitution, which defines the country's policy on foreigners and their status. Among these amendments, the initiative calls for the abolition of seasonal worker status, the right to automatic renewal of residence permits, and freedom of choice in employment and place of residence, while restricting immigration..

The full text of the initiative can be consulted on the website of the Swiss Federal Chancellery.

== Background ==
=== Historical context ===
Between 1950 and 1978, the percentage of the foreign population in Switzerland rose from 5% to 14.4% of the total population. This increase, mainly due to the arrival of workers from southern Europe, led to the launch of several initiatives known as the "initiatives against foreign overpopulation", presented by various far-right movements, including National Action led by Zurich deputy James Schwarzenbach.These initiatives were all rejected in votes held on 7 June 1970, 20 October 1974, and 13 March 1977,.

The present initiative was launched in response to these proposals to limit the number of foreigners.

=== Collection of signatures and submission of the initiative ===
The collection of the required 100,000 signatures began at the end of October 1974 (the exact date has not been preserved). On 20 October 1977, the initiative was submitted to the Swiss Federal Chancellery, which declared it valid on 8 November.

=== Discussions and recommendations of the authorities ===
Both the Federal Assembly and the Federal Council recommended rejection of the initiative. In its message to the Assembly, the Federal Council acknowledged the positive aspect of the initiators' desire to improve the legal status of foreigners. However, according to him, several measures called for in this initiative “go too far,” thus justifying its rejection. As an indirect counterproposal, the government is presenting a revision of the law on foreigners, which is currently being finalized.

=== Vote ===
Put to a vote on 5 April 1981, the initiative was rejected by all 20 6/2 cantons and by 83.8% of voters. The table below details the results by canton:

Canton	Yes (%)
Zürich	15.6
Bern	13.6
Lucerne	12.7
Uri	10.1
Schwyz	11.1
Obwalden	8.6
Nidwalden	9.8
Glarus	7.1
Zug	12.3
Fribourg	24.2
Solothurn	13.3
Basel-Stadt	18.8
Basel-Landschaft	18.0
Schaffhausen	15.2
Appenzell Ausserrhoden	10.5
Appenzell Innerrhoden	7.1
St. Gallen	10.1
Graubünden	8.8
Aargau	11.8
Thurgau	10.4
Ticino	18.2
Vaud	24.7
Valais	13.0
Neuchâtel	30.5
Geneva	24.1
Jura	44.3

== Aftermath ==
In line with the government's proposal, and following the popular rejection of this initiative, the federal chambers approved a new version of the law a few months after the vote. However, this revision was challenged in a referendum by National Action, which considered it made Switzerland too attractive to foreigners wishing to settle there. It was submitted to popular vote and rejected on 6 June 1982, forcing the authorities to come up with a new proposal. This eventually entered into force on 16 December 2005 under the name "Federal Act on Foreign Nationals" (FNIA)
