= Karen Andrews =

Australian politician (born 1960)

The Honourable Karen Andrews
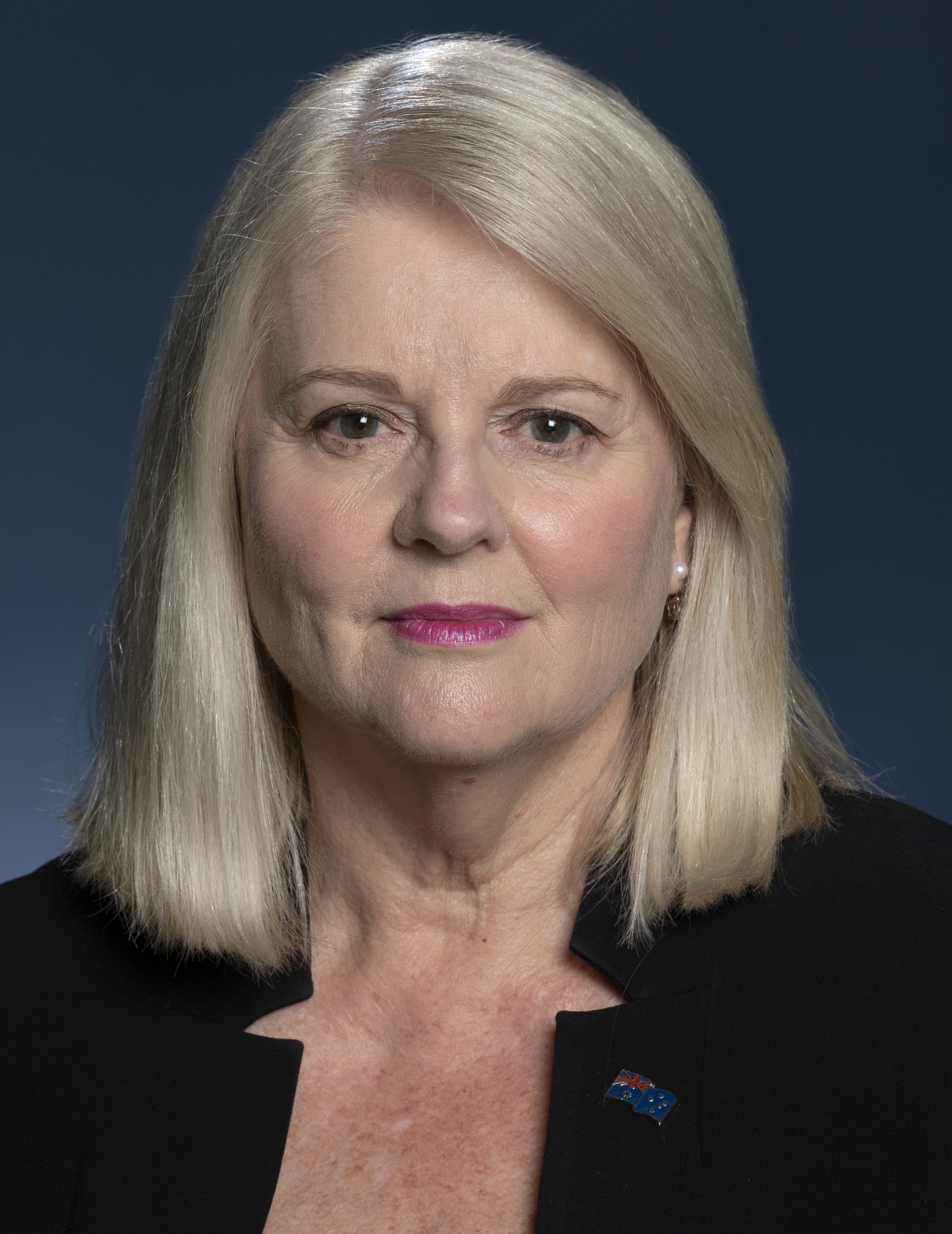
- Official portrait, 2021

Minister for Home Affairs
- In office 30 March 2021 – 23 May 2022 Serving with Scott Morrison
- Prime Minister: Scott Morrison
- Preceded by: Peter Dutton
- Succeeded by: Jim Chalmers (interim); Clare O'Neil

Minister for Industry, Science and Technology
- In office 28 August 2018 – 30 March 2021
- Prime Minister: Scott Morrison
- Preceded by: Arthur Sinodinos (2017)
- Succeeded by: Christian Porter

Assistant Minister for Vocational Education and Skills
- In office 19 July 2016 – 28 August 2018
- Prime Minister: Malcolm Turnbull; Scott Morrison
- Preceded by: Scott Ryan
- Succeeded by: Steve Irons (2019)

Assistant Minister for Science
- In office 23 December 2014 – 19 July 2016
- Prime Minister: Tony Abbott; Malcolm Turnbull
- Preceded by: Office established
- Succeeded by: Craig Laundy

Member of the Australian Parliament for McPherson
- In office 21 August 2010 – 28 March 2025
- Preceded by: Margaret May
- Succeeded by: Leon Rebello

Personal details
- Born: Karen Lesley Weir; 23 August 1960 (age 66) Brisbane, Queensland, Australia
- Party: Liberal (LNP)
- Spouse: Chris Andrews
- Children: 3
- Education: Queensland University of Technology; Victoria University
- Occupation: Industrial relations advocate
- Profession: Mechanical engineer
- Website: karenandrewsmp.com

Karen Lesley Andrews (née Weir; born 23 August 1960) is an Australian politician who served in the Morrison government as Minister for Industry, Science and Technology from 2018 to 2021 and as Minister for Home Affairs from 2021 to 2022. She is a member of the Liberal National Party of Queensland and has represented the Queensland seat of McPherson since the 2010 federal election. Andrews sat as a Liberal and previously served as an assistant minister in the Abbott and Turnbull governments. Before entering politics, she was a mechanical engineer and industrial relations consultant.

On 18 April 2023, Andrews announced that she would retire at the 2025 Australian federal election.

== Early life ==
Andrews was born in Brisbane on 23 August 1960. She is the daughter of William and Moya Weir; her father served in World War II and was later national secretary and treasurer of an organisation for disabled veterans.

Andrews grew up in Townsville and attended Townsville Grammar School. She subsequently completed the degree of Bachelor of Mechanical Engineering at the Queensland Institute of Technology, as one of the engineering faculty's first two female graduates. After graduating, Andrews worked as a drafter with the Queensland Electricity Generating Board and in plant maintenance at the Gladstone Power Station. She later moved to Victoria to work in the oil industry as a supervisor, during which time she completed a graduate diploma in industrial relations at Victoria University. She then worked for an employers' association as an industrial advocate within the metal, engineering and construction industries, representing the interests of employers in negotiations with employees.

In the mid-1990s, Andrews joined the Victorian Department of Health and Community Services as head of its industrial branch, working under the responsible minister Marie Tehan. She later established an industrial relations consultancy business, focusing on alternative dispute resolution and mediation. In 2002 she moved to the Gold Coast, Queensland.

== Political career ==
In October 2009, Andrews won a Liberal National Party of Queensland ballot for preselection in the federal seat of McPherson, following the retirement of the incumbent MP Margaret May. She defeated three candidates, including Peter Dutton, the incumbent MP for Dickson, who sought to transfer seats after an unfavourable redistribution. She retained the seat for the LNP at the 2010 federal election.

Andrews was a founding co-chair of the Parliamentary Friends of Science in 2012, along with Richard Marles. She served as chair of the joint statutory committee on public works from 2013 to 2015 and was also appointed to the speaker's panel in 2014.

In February 2014, Andrews was reportedly involved in a "heated" verbal altercation with state government minister Jann Stuckey in front of students at a primary school in Elanora, Queensland, after Stucky "objected to a staffer from Ms Andrews' office taking a photograph of her". In July 2014, the Gold Coast Bulletin reported that her office had an unusually high employee turnover and that former staffers had accused her of creating a hostile work environment. Andrews responded that the high turnover was normal for a parliamentary office.

=== Government minister ===
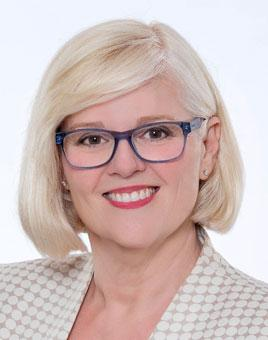
Andrews in 2015

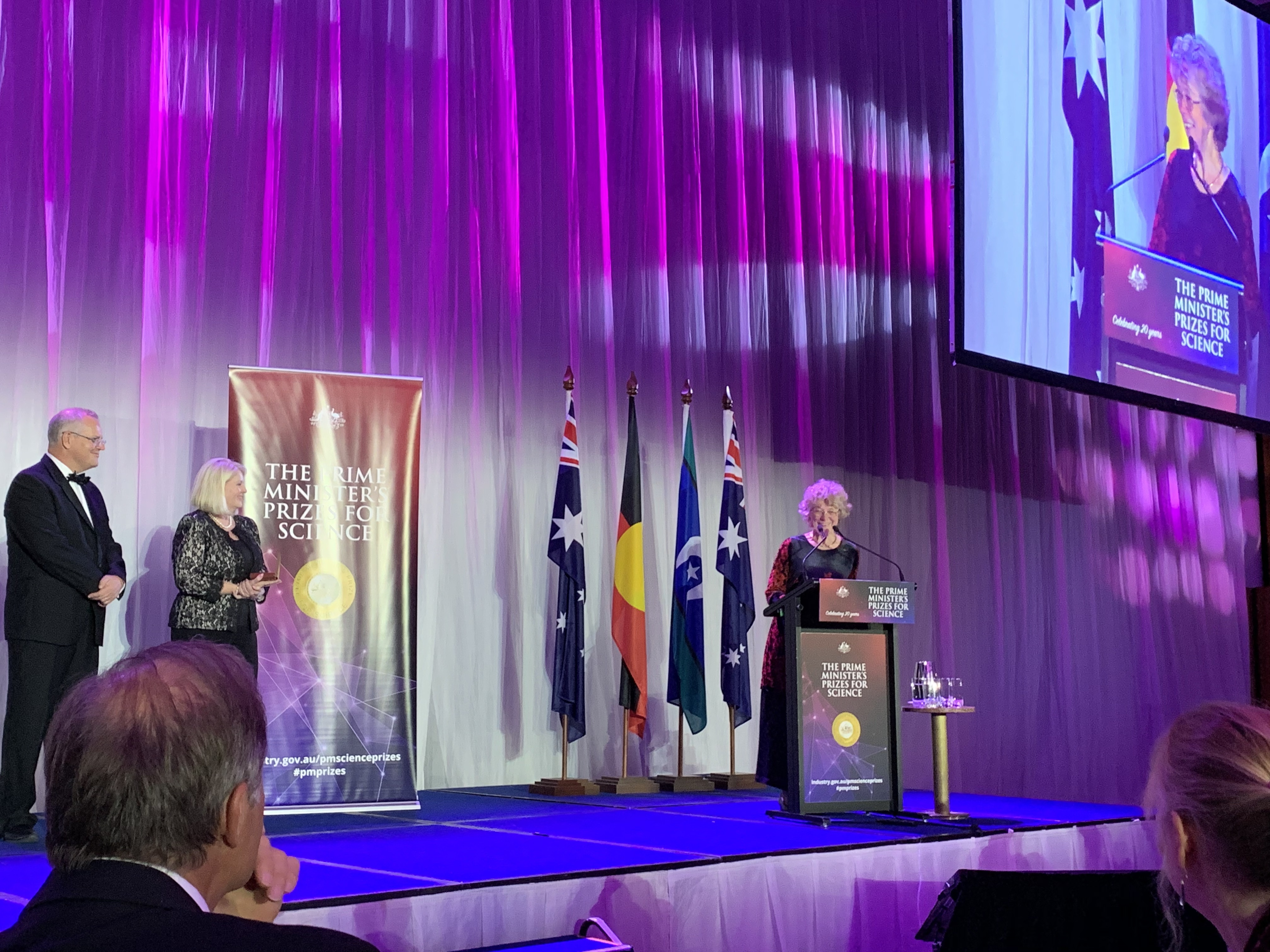
Andrews at the 2019 PM's Prize for Science with Prime Minister Scott Morrison and prize recipient Cheryl Praeger

In December 2014, Andrews was promoted to parliamentary secretary to the Minister for Industry and Science in the Abbott Ministry. Her title was changed to Assistant Minister for Science in September 2015, when Malcolm Turnbull replaced Abbott as prime minister. Following a reshuffle in July 2016, she was instead made Assistant Minister for Vocational Education and Skills.

During the 2018 Liberal leadership spills, Andrews reportedly supported Peter Dutton against Turnbull in the first ballot. She voted against holding a second ballot, but subsequently voted for Scott Morrison against Dutton. Andrews was then promoted to Minister for Industry, Science and Technology in the newly formed Morrison government. She was sworn in on 28 August 2018.

As science minister, Andrews announced the creation of a Cooperative Research Centre on clean energy and additional funding for artificial intelligence research and the Australian Space Agency. According to The Australian, during the initial stages of the COVID-19 pandemic she "became a key player in the government's response as it scrambled to reassure the public about both the contagion itself and the panic-buying that soon began threatening supplies of food, toilet paper and sanitising products".

Andrews was appointed Minister for Home Affairs in March 2021, following a cabinet reshuffle related to the 2021 Australian Parliament House sexual misconduct allegations.

=== Political positions ===
Andrews is currently factionally unaligned, after previously identifying as a member of the Centre Right faction of the Liberal Party during the Morrison government.

Andrews has identified as a feminist.

In a 2018 interview with Sky News, Andrews declared that coal would play a major role in Australia's energy mix in the future.

In January 2020, Andrews stated that it was time to move on from ideological battles over climate change, saying that it had robbed Australia of the time and energy needed to respond to the change. "Every second that we spend talking about whether or not the climate is changing is a second that we are not spending on looking at adaptation [and] mitigation strategies. It really is time for everyone to move on and look at what we're going to do."

In 2023, Andrews stated that she was disappointed that only one of the potential Liberal candidates for the by-election in the seat of Fadden was female. Andrews had previously gone on record criticising the Liberal party for its underrepresentation of women.

== Personal life ==
Andrews has three daughters with her husband Chris. As of 2018, according to the parliamentary register of financial interests, she owned nine investment properties.

Parliament of Australia
Preceded by Margaret May	Member for McPherson; 2010–2025	Succeeded by Leon Rebello
Political offices
Preceded by Peter Dutton	Minister for Home Affairs; 2021–2022	Succeeded by Clare O'Neil
New title	Minister for Industry, Science and Technology; 2018–2021	Succeeded by Christian Porter
