= Leon Rebello =

Australian politician (born 1995)

Leon Rebello MP
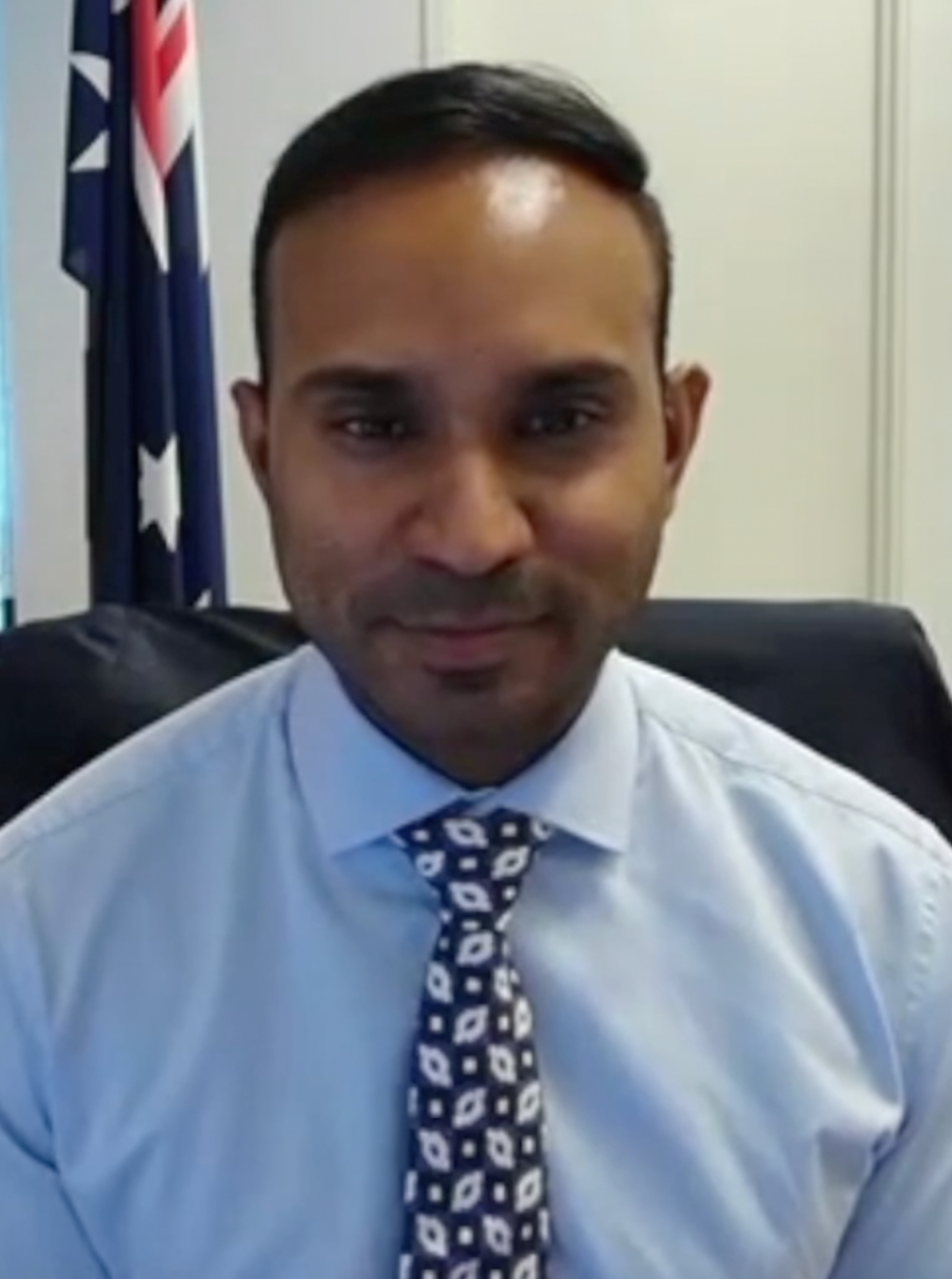
- Rebello in August 2026

Member of the Australian Parliament for McPherson
- Incumbent
- Assumed office 3 May 2025
- Preceded by: Karen Andrews

Personal details
- Born: 22 December 1994 (age 31) Canberra, Australian Capital Territory
- Party: Liberal National (Note: Member of the Liberal National Party who sits in the federal Liberal party room.)
- Profession: Solicitor

Leon Rebello (born 22 December 1994) is an Australian solicitor and politician who was elected as the Liberal National Party member for the division of McPherson since the 2025 federal election.

== Early life ==
Leon Rebello was born in Canberra to immigrant parents, who originated from the Indian state of Goa. Rebello's father, Valeriano, worked at the Indian Technical Institute as a faculty head and now works as a tradesman, while his mother, Liddy, works as a public servant in Australia, having been a private sector employee in India.

== Career ==
Rebello worked at King & Wood Mallesons (KWM), a major international law firm as a solicitor for six years, focusing on foreign investment. He also worked as a staffer for former Minister of Foreign Affairs Julie Bishop.

== Political career ==
Among a field of men only, which the retiring incumbent MP and Morrison government minister Karen Andrews described as “enormously frustrating”, Rebello was preselected by the Liberal National Party in May 2024. Several of his campaign signs were vandalised with racial slurs.

Rebello was elected to the House of Representatives division of McPherson at the 2025 federal election, succeeding retiring MP and former government minister Karen Andrews, despite a swing towards Labor.

== Notes ==
Parliament of Australia
Preceded by Karen Andrews	Member for McPherson; 2025–present	Incumbent
