= 1981 Boothby by-election =

A by-election was held for the Australian House of Representatives seat of Boothby on 21 February 1981. This was triggered by the resignation of Liberal Party MP John McLeay, who subsequently took up the role of Consul General in Los Angeles. It was held on the same day as by-elections for Curtin and McPherson.

This by-election was won by Steele Hall, who was Premier of South Australia from 1968 to 1970.

== Key dates ==
Date	Event
22 January 1981	Hon John McLeay resigned from Parliament.
27 January 1981	The writ for the by-election was issued.
13 February 1981	Close of nominations.
21 February 1981	Polling day.
24 February 1981	The writ was returned and Steele Hall was sworn in as the member for Boothby.
27 March 1981	The original deadline for the writ to be returned.

== Results ==
Boothby by-election, 1981
Party	Candidate	Votes	%	±%
Liberal	Steele Hall	36,406	56.71	+0.55
Labor	Bruce Whyatt	17,108	26.65	−3.09
Democrats	Robert Hercus	9,188	14.31	+1.25
Independent	Alf Gard	555	0.86	+0.86
Unemployed Workers	David Arkins	544	0.85	+0.85
Progressive Conservative	John Herren	398	0.62	+0.62
Total formal votes		64,199	97.75	−0.38
Informal votes		1,480	2.25	+0.38
Turnout		65,679	81.69	−12.67
Liberal hold		Swing	+1.4	

== See also ==
- List of Australian federal by-elections
