= 1981 McPherson by-election =

A by-election was held for the Australian House of Representatives seat of McPherson on 21 February 1981. This was triggered by the sudden death of Liberal Party MP Eric Robinson. It was held on the same day as by-elections for Boothby and Curtin.

Although National Country Party Senator Glen Sheil resigned from the Senate to contest the by-election, it was won by Liberal candidate Peter White, a former member of the Legislative Assembly of Queensland who had retired in preparation for the by-election.

The 1981 McPherson by-election is among the frequent by-elections triggered by the death of the sitting member and would in fact be the last by-election triggered by the death of a sitting member until the 2000 Isaacs by-election triggered by the suicide of Greg Wilton.

== Key dates ==
Date	Event
7 January 1981	Eric Robinson died suddenly of acute myocardial infarction in Southport.
27 January 1981	The writ for the by-election was issued.
11 February 1981	Close of nominations.
21 February 1981	Polling day.
4 March 1981	The writ was returned and Peter White was sworn in as the member for McPherson.
27 March 1981	The original deadline for the writ to be returned.

== Results ==
McPherson by-election, 1981
Party	Candidate	Votes	%	±%
Liberal	Peter White	29,776	41.91	−1.39
National Country	Glen Sheil	21,189	29.82	+29.82
Labor	Ronald McKenna	18,278	25.73	−5.03
Progress	Kevin Chaffey	537	0.76	+0.76
Independent	William Aabraham-Steer	512	0.72	−1.07
Independent	Hubert Giesberts	469	0.66	+0.66
Independent	Peter Courtney	290	0.41	+0.41
Total formal votes		71,051	97.83	+0.15
Informal votes		1,575	2.17	–0.15
Turnout		72,626	84.31	–8.37
Two-party-preferred result
Liberal	Peter White	46,336	65.22	+11.62
National Country	Glen Sheil	24,715	34.78	+34.78
Liberal hold		Swing	+11.62	
