= Peter White (Australian politician, born 1936) =

Australian Army officer and politician

Member of the Australian Parliament for McPherson
- In office 21 February 1981 – 19 February 1990
- Preceded by: Eric Robinson
- Succeeded by: John Bradford

Member of the Queensland Legislative Assembly for Southport
- In office 12 November 1977 – 29 November 1980
- Preceded by: New seat
- Succeeded by: Doug Jennings

Personal details
- Born: Peter Nicholson Duckett White; 19 January 1936 Brisbane, Queensland
- Died: 13 February 2005 (aged 69)
- Party: Liberal Party of Australia
- Spouse: Shirley Estelle Mace (m.1964)
- Education: Australian National University
- Occupation: Soldier

Military service
- Allegiance: Australia
- Branch/service: Australian Army
- Years of service: 1954–1975
- Rank: Lieutenant Colonel
- Commands: 1st Battalion, Royal Australian Regiment (1973–74)
- Battles/wars: Vietnam War
- Awards: Military Cross

Peter Nicholson Duckett White, MC (19 January 1936 – 13 February 2005) was an Australian Army officer and politician. Born in Brisbane, he was educated at the Royal Military College, Duntroon and the Australian National University in Canberra. He served in the Australian Army from 1954 to 1975, during which time he deployed to Malaya and Vietnam, was awarded the Military Cross, and rose to the rank of lieutenant colonel. In 1977, he was elected to the Legislative Assembly of Queensland as the Liberal member for Southport. He held that position until 1980, when he was defeated by National Party candidate, Doug Jennings.

White then entered federal politics, winning the by-election for the Australian House of Representatives seat of McPherson caused by the death of Liberal minister Eric Robinson. Although challenged by former senator Glen Sheil of the National Country Party, he won the seat safely. He held the seat until his retirement in 1990. White died in 2005.

Parliament of Queensland
Preceded by New seat	Member for Southport; 1977–1980	Succeeded by Doug Jennings
Parliament of Australia
Preceded by Eric Robinson	Member for McPherson; 1981–1990	Succeeded by John Bradford
