= Division of McPherson =

Australian federal electoral division

Coordinates: 28.148°S 153.399°E

McPherson Australian House of Representatives Division
- Interactive map of boundaries since the 2019 federal election
- Created: 1949
- MP: Leon Rebello
- Party: Liberal (Note: Member of the Liberal National Party of Queensland sitting with the federal parliamentary Liberal Party.)
- Namesake: McPherson Range
- Electors: 121,579 (2025)
- Area: 229 km^{2} (88.4 sq mi)
- Demographic: Provincial

The Division of McPherson is an Australian Electoral Division in Queensland. The current MP is Leon Rebello of the Liberal Party.

== Geography ==
Since 1984, federal electoral division boundaries in Australia have been determined at redistributions by a redistribution committee appointed by the Australian Electoral Commission. Redistributions occur for the boundaries of divisions in a particular state, and they occur every seven years, or sooner if a state's representation entitlement changes or when divisions of a state are malapportioned.

== History ==
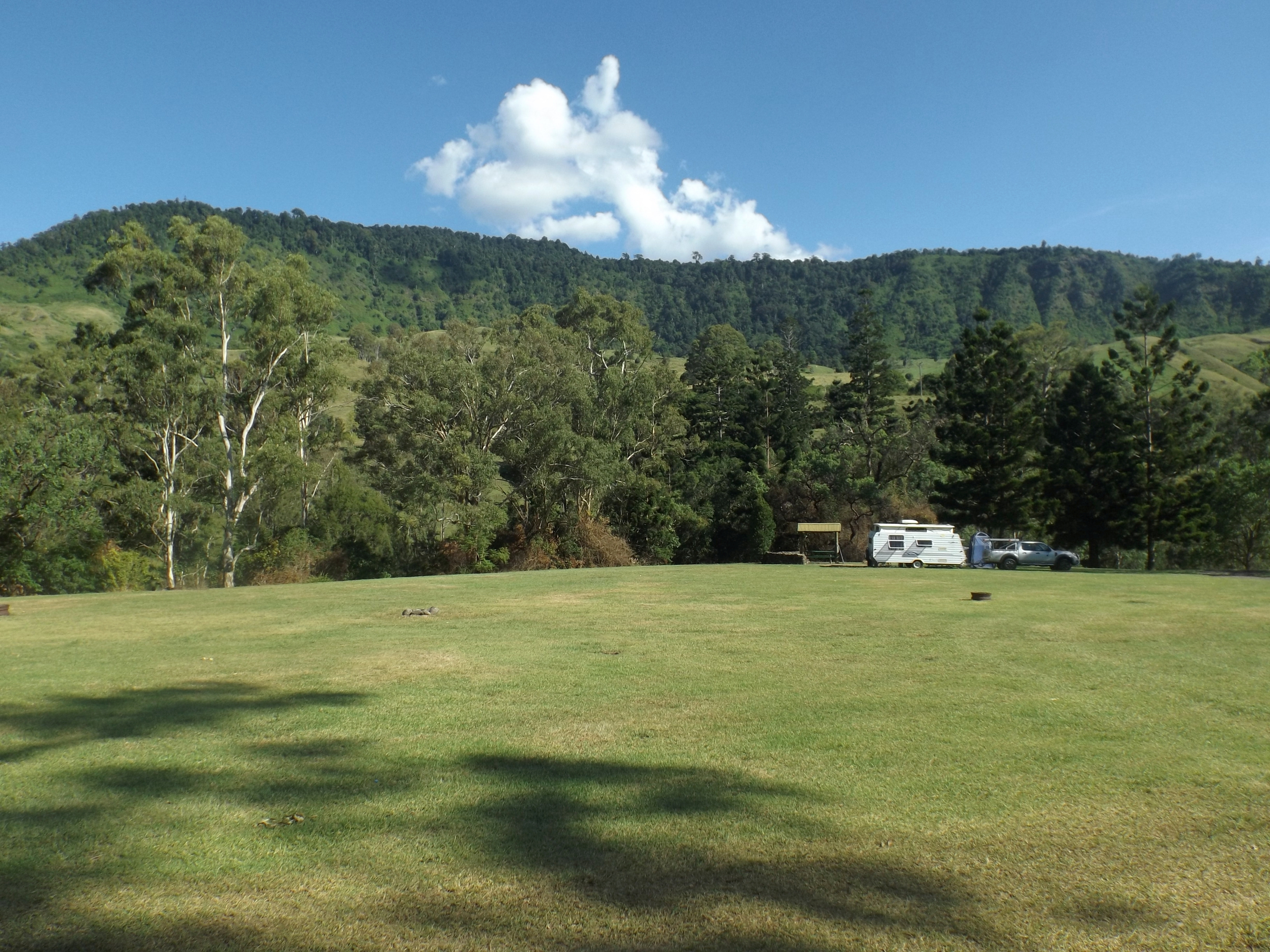
McPherson Range, a region in Queensland from which the division takes its name

The division was created in 1948 and is named after the McPherson Range, which forms one of the divisional boundaries. McPherson is located in south-east Queensland, and originally included the entire Gold Coast region, stretching as far as the Scenic Rim and Southern Downs. However, the area's dramatic population growth has seen the seat shrink with successive redistributions, culminating in 1983, when most of its northern portion became Moncrieff.

McPherson now incorporates the southern portion of the Gold Coast, including Coolangatta, Burleigh Heads, Tugun and Palm Beach.

It has always been held by a conservative party. Indeed, most of the area has been represented by centre-right MPs without interruption since 1906; before 1949, most of the Gold Coast was part of Moreton. Originally a Country Party bastion, urbanisation has turned it into a Liberal stronghold.

== Members ==
Image	Member	Party	Term	Notes
	Sir Arthur Fadden (1894–1973)	Country	10 December 1949 – 14 October 1958	Previously held the Division of Darling Downs. Served as minister under Menzies. Retired
	Charles Barnes (1901–1998)	Country	22 November 1958 – 2 November 1972	Served as minister under Menzies, Holt, McEwen, Gorton and McMahon. Retired
	Eric Robinson (1929–1981)	Liberal	2 December 1972 – 7 January 1981	Served as minister under Fraser. Died in office
	Peter White (1936–2005)	Liberal	21 February 1981 – 19 February 1990	Previously held the Legislative Assembly of Queensland seat of Southport. Retired
	John Bradford (1946–)	Liberal	24 March 1990 – 7 April 1998	Did not contest in 1998. Failed to win a Senate seat
	John Bradford (1946–)	Christian Democrats	7 April 1998 – 31 August 1998	Did not contest in 1998. Failed to win a Senate seat
	Margaret May (1950–)	Liberal	3 October 1998 – 19 July 2010	Retired
	Karen Andrews (1960–)	Liberal	21 August 2010 – 28 March 2025	Served as minister under Morrison. Retired
	Leon Rebello (1994–)	Liberal	3 May 2025 – present	Incumbent

== Election results ==
2025 Australian federal election: McPherson
Party	Candidate	Votes	%	±%
Liberal National	Leon Rebello	34,918	35.92	−7.64
Labor	Alice Price	22,778	23.43	+1.43
Independent	Erchana Murray-Bartlett	13,366	13.75	+13.75
Greens	Amanda Kennealy	8,175	8.41	−7.01
One Nation	Zyion Attiig	4,229	4.35	−2.87
People First	Harry Hatzikalimnios	3,158	3.25	+3.25
Legalise Cannabis	Jeff Knipe	2,751	2.83	+2.83
Trumpet of Patriots	Max Creswick	2,681	2.76	+2.15
Libertarian	Gary Biggs	1,432	1.47	−0.65
Family First	Neena Tester	1,366	1.41	+1.41
Independent	Michelle Faye	1,221	1.26	+1.26
Animal Justice	Jennifer Horsburgh	1,140	1.17	+1.17
Total formal votes		97,215	91.55	−3.03
Informal votes		8,968	8.45	+3.03
Turnout		106,183	87.36	−0.20
Two-party-preferred result
Liberal National	Leon Rebello	52,920	54.44	−4.90
Labor	Alice Price	44,295	45.56	+4.90
Liberal National hold		Swing	−4.90	
