= Victor Garland =

Australian politician and diplomat (1934–2022)

The Honourable Sir Victor Garland KBE
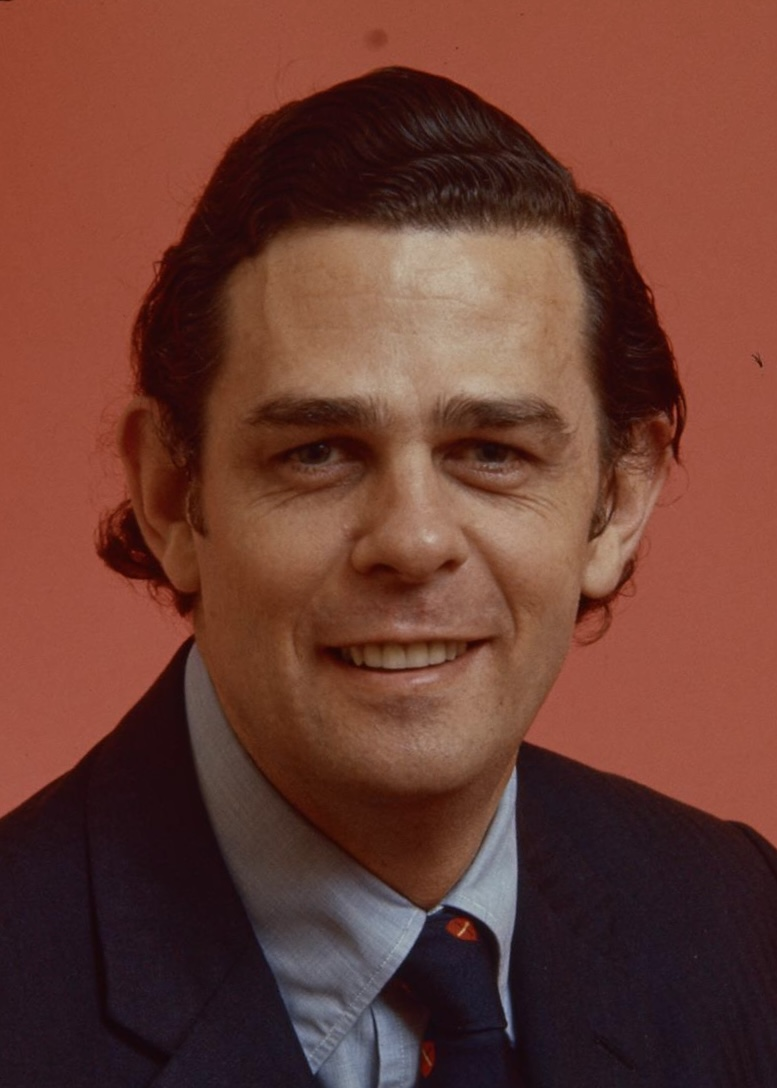
- Garland in 1974

Minister for Business and Consumer Affairs
- In office 8 December 1979 – 3 November 1980
- Prime Minister: Malcolm Fraser
- Preceded by: Wal Fife
- Succeeded by: John Moore

Minister for Special Trade Representations
- In office 20 December 1977 – 8 December 1979
- Prime Minister: Malcolm Fraser
- Preceded by: John Howard
- Succeeded by: Douglas Scott

Minister for Veterans' Affairs
- In office 6 September 1977 – 4 July 1978
- Prime Minister: Malcolm Fraser
- Preceded by: Peter Durack
- Succeeded by: Evan Adermann

Minister for Post and Telecommunications
- In office 22 December 1975 – 6 December 1976
- Prime Minister: Malcolm Fraser
- Preceded by: Peter Nixon
- Succeeded by: Eric Robinson

Minister for Supply
- In office 2 August 1971 – 5 December 1972
- Prime Minister: William McMahon
- Preceded by: Ken Anderson
- Succeeded by: Lance Barnard

High Commissioner to the United Kingdom
- In office April 1981 – 21 December 1983
- Preceded by: James Plimsoll
- Succeeded by: Alfred Parsons

Member of the Australian Parliament for Curtin
- In office 19 April 1969 – 22 January 1981
- Preceded by: Paul Hasluck
- Succeeded by: Allan Rocher

Personal details
- Born: 5 May 1934 Perth, Western Australia
- Died: 1 January 2022 (aged 87)
- Party: Liberal
- Spouse: Lynette Jamieson (m. 1960)
- Education: University of Western Australia

Sir Ransley Victor Garland KBE (5 May 1934 – 1 January 2022), usually known as Vic Garland, was an Australian politician and diplomat. He was a member of the House of Representatives from 1969 to 1981, representing the Liberal Party, and served as a minister in the McMahon and Fraser governments. He later served as High Commissioner to the United Kingdom from 1981 to 1983.

== Early life ==
Garland was born in 1934 and grew up in Perth, Western Australia. He was educated at Hale School and the University of Western Australia, obtaining a Bachelor of Arts with a major in Economics. He followed his father into the accounting profession, practising as a chartered accountant from 1958 to 1969. He served as a councillor for the South Ward of the Town of Claremont from 1963 to 1970, finishing as deputy mayor.

He joined the Liberal Party in 1957, and served in several branch and administrative roles. He was the Curtin division president in 1960–1961 and president of the Claremont branch from 1965. At the time of his preselection in 1969, he was senior vice-president of the Liberal Party's Western Australian Division.

== Politics ==
=== Early career ===
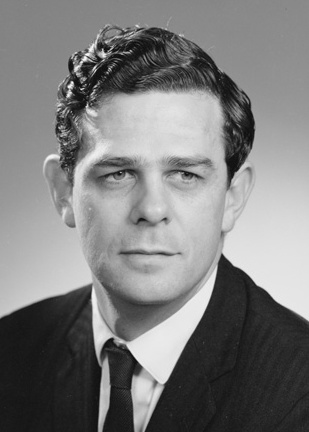
Garland in 1969

When Paul Hasluck resigned from Parliament in 1969 to become Governor-General of Australia, Garland succeeded him as the member for Curtin, a comfortably safe Liberal seat in Perth's wealthy beachside suburbs.

Following a cabinet reshuffle in August 1971, Garland was appointed Minister for Supply in the McMahon government. Aged 37, he became the second-youngest member of the ministry after Andrew Peacock. In March 1972, he was also appointed Minister assisting the Treasurer, in place of Peacock. He retained his positions until the defeat of the government at the 1972 federal election. Notably, as supply minister he authorised the purchase of ten new Westland Sea King helicopters to replace the Westland Wessex as Australia's anti-submarine warfare helicopters. He also unsuccessfully attempted to convince cabinet to purchase Dassault Mirage F1 fighter jets from France, which would have been manufactured in Australia.

Garland was named in Billy Snedden's interim opposition executive after the election, but failed to win election to the shadow ministry when a vote was held in January 1973. However, in June 1974 he succeeded Max Fox as Chief Opposition Whip.

=== Fraser government ===
After the Coalition's victory at the 1975 federal election, Garland was appointed Minister for Post and Telecommunications in the Fraser government. He was the first person to hold the title, which replaced the earlier position of Postmaster-General.

Garland resigned from the ministry on 6 February 1976, when the Commonwealth Police began an investigation into allegations that he had violated the electoral act. He and former senator George Branson were alleged to have paid $500 to cover the electoral expenses of Michael Cavanough, an independent Senate candidate in the Australian Capital Territory (ACT), on the condition that he direct his preferences to the Liberal candidate John Knight. The allegations were first publicised by The Canberra Times in the lead-up to the election. Garland and Branson denied that they had engaged in bribery, as they were of the belief that Cavanough had already agreed to give his preferences to Knight.

The charges were dismissed at a committal hearing in the Magistrates Court of the Australian Capital Territory on 8 March, with the chief magistrate stating that there was a prima facie case against the pair but that "a jury properly directed would not convict the defendants". The Canberra Times was critical of the decision to discharge the defendants without a trial, stating that it left doubt as to the legality of their conduct and also deprived them of the vindication of an acquittal.

For several months Garland remained a backbencher before being appointed the first Chairman of the House of Representatives Expenditure Committee (1976–1977), Minister for Veterans' Affairs (1977–1978), Minister for Special Trade Representations (1978–1979) and Minister for Business and Consumer Affairs (1979–1980).

== Later life ==
Following the November 1980 federal election, Garland resigned from Parliament on 22 January 1981 to accept appointment as Australian High Commissioner in the United Kingdom, a post he held from 1981 to 1983. In 1982, he became a Knight Commander of the Order of the British Empire (KBE).

Following his departure from the High Commissioner's post, he stayed on in London, serving as non-executive director or executive director of over 30 companies in the UK and the US. The most notable were the Prudential Assurance plc for nearly 10 years, the South Bank Board (Royal Festival Hall Complex) as vice-chairman for 15 years, The Throgmorton Trust plc, Classic ITC Threadneedle AMC (India), Nelson Hurst plc, Signet Group plc, The Ark Funds Inc. (US), Mitchell Cotts plc, Fidelity Asian Values plc and many finance companies, some of which he chaired.

In July 2007 he returned to Perth, Western Australia.

== Personal life and death ==
In 1960 he married Lynette Jamieson, and they had three children. Lady Garland is an active professional classical pianist who performs as Lyn Garland. Victor Garland died on 1 January 2022, at the age of 87. His death left Tom Hughes (who died on 28 November 2024) as the last surviving Liberal member of the McMahon Ministry.

Political offices
Preceded by Ken Anderson	Minister for Supply; 1971–1972	Succeeded by Lance Barnard
Preceded by Peter Nixon; Postmaster-General	Minister for Post and Telecommunications; 1975–1976	Succeeded by Eric Robinson
Preceded by Peter Durack	Minister for Veterans' Affairs; 1977–1978	Succeeded by Evan Adermann
Preceded by John Howard	Minister for Special Trade Representations; 1978–1979	Succeeded by Douglas Scott
Preceded by Wal Fife	Minister for Business and Consumer Affairs; 1979–1980	Succeeded by John Moore
Parliament of Australia
Preceded by Paul Hasluck	Member for Curtin; 1969–1981	Succeeded by Allan Rocher
Diplomatic posts
Preceded by Sir James Plimsoll	Australian High Commissioner to the United Kingdom; 1981–1983	Succeeded by Alfred Parsons
