= Eric Robinson (Australian politician) =

Australian politician

The Honourable Eric Robinson
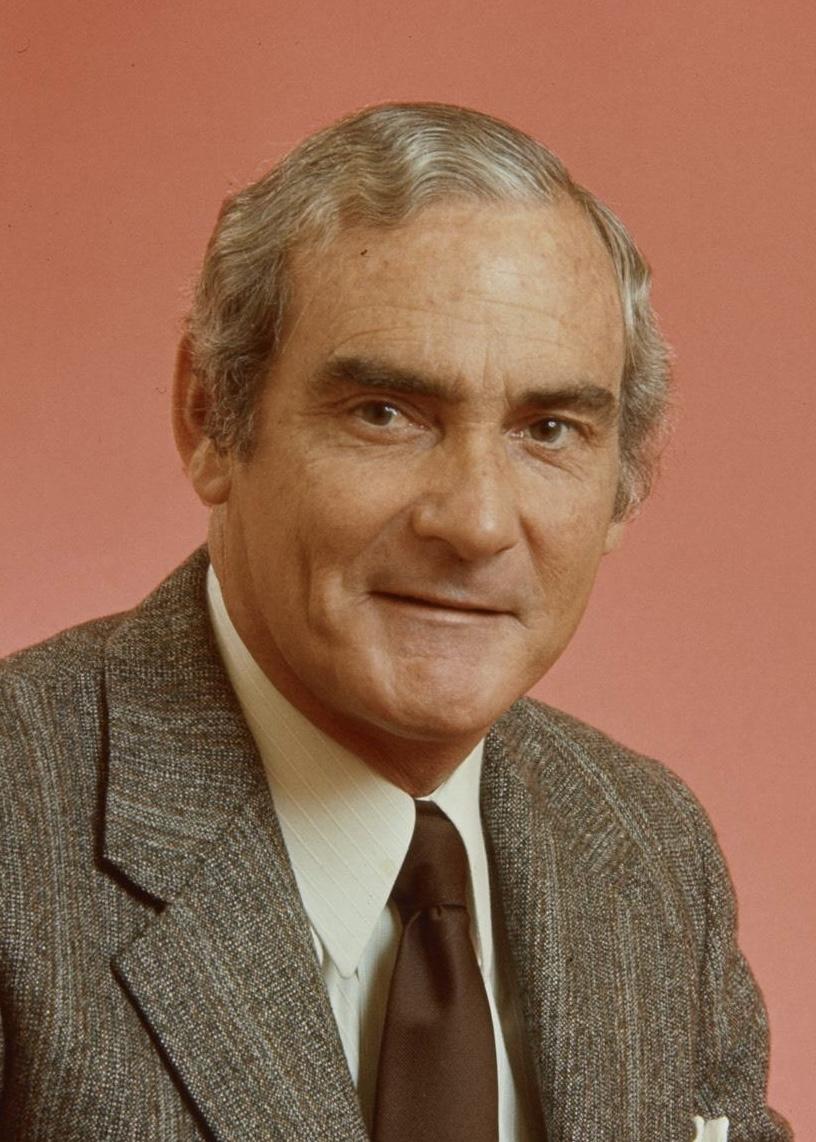
- Robinson in 1974

Minister for Finance
- In office 27 February 1979 – 3 November 1980
- Prime Minister: Malcolm Fraser
- Preceded by: John Howard (acting)
- Succeeded by: Margaret Guilfoyle
- In office 20 December 1977 – 23 February 1979
- Prime Minister: Malcolm Fraser
- Preceded by: Phillip Lynch
- Succeeded by: John Howard (acting)

Minister for Post and Telecommunications
- In office 6 February 1976 – 20 December 1977
- Prime Minister: Malcolm Fraser
- Preceded by: Vic Garland
- Succeeded by: Tony Staley

Minister for the Capital Territory
- In office 22 November 1975 – 16 February 1976
- Prime Minister: Malcolm Fraser
- Preceded by: Reg Withers
- Succeeded by: Tony Staley

Member of the Australian Parliament for McPherson
- In office 2 December 1972 – 7 January 1981
- Preceded by: Charles Barnes
- Succeeded by: Peter White

Personal details
- Born: 18 January 1929 East Brisbane, Queensland, Australia
- Died: 7 January 1981 (aged 51) Southport, Queensland, Australia
- Party: Liberal
- Occupation: Businessman; Politician

Eric Laidlaw Robinson (18 January 1929 – 7 January 1981) was an Australian politician. He was a member of the Liberal Party and held ministerial office in the Fraser government, serving as Minister for the Capital Territory (1975–1976), Post and Telecommunications (1976–1977), and Finance (1977–1979, 1979–1980). He represented the Queensland seat of McPherson in the House of Representatives from 1972 until his death in 1981.

== Early life ==
Robinson was born on 18 January 1929 in East Brisbane, Queensland, the son of Florence Evelyn (née Laidlaw) and Arthur Neville Robinson. He attended the Slade School in Warwick and then joined his father's sporting goods business. Prior to entering politics he served as managing director and chairman of Robinson Holdings Pty Ltd, overseeing "a chain of stores in coastal Queensland". In 1964 he married Narelle Beel (née Jones), who had two children from a previous marriage.

== Politics ==
Robinson joined the Queensland Liberal Party in 1957 and in 1963 was a founding member of the Surfers Paradise branch. He was state president of the Liberals from 1968 to 1973. He was elected to the Federal seat of McPherson in the House of Representatives at the 1972 federal election.

Following Malcolm Fraser's win at the 1975 election, he was appointed Minister for the Capital Territory in the Fraser ministry. In February 1976, he was moved to Minister for Post and Telecommunications. He was appointed Minister for Finance following Phillip Lynch's standing down in 1977. Allegations of malpractice by him were dealt with in the Royal Commission of Inquiry into Matters in Relation to Electoral Redistribution in Queensland 1977, which exonerated him of wrongdoing. On 22 February 1979, he resigned from the ministry, stating in a letter to Fraser that he could no longer give him his "unqualified support". On 27 February he agreed to return as Minister for Finance—Fraser said that "there were no significant differences" between them. He was not reappointed to the ministry following the 1980 election.

Robinson died suddenly in 1981 in Southport of acute myocardial infarction, while still in office. He was survived by his wife, Narelle, a son and a daughter.

Parliament of Australia
Preceded by Charles Barnes	Member of Parliament for McPherson; 1972–1981	Succeeded by Peter White
Political offices
Preceded by Reg Withers	Minister for the Capital Territory; 1975–76	Succeeded by Tony Staley
Preceded by Victor Garland	Minister for Post and Telecommunications; 1976–77	Succeeded by Tony Staley
Preceded by Phillip Lynch	Minister for Finance; 1977–79	Succeeded by John Howard
Preceded by John Howard	Minister for Finance; 1979–80	Succeeded by Margaret Guilfoyle
