= Electoral results for the Division of Wentworth =

Australian division election results

This is a list of electoral results for the Division of Wentworth in Australian federal elections from the division's creation in 1901 until the present.

== Members ==
Member	Party	Term
Sir William McMillan	Free Trade	1901–1903
Willie Kelly	Free Trade, Anti-Socialist	1903–1909
Willie Kelly	Liberal	1909–1916
Willie Kelly	Nationalist	1916–1919
Walter Marks	Nationalist	1919–1929
Walter Marks	Independent Nationalist	1929–1930
Walter Marks	Australian Party	1930–1931
Walter Marks	United Australia	1931–1931
(Sir) Eric Harrison	United Australia	1931–1944
(Sir) Eric Harrison	Liberal	1944–1956
Les Bury	Liberal	1956–1974
Bob Ellicott	Liberal	1974–1981
Peter Coleman	Liberal	1981–1987
John Hewson	Liberal	1987–1995
Andrew Thomson	Liberal	1995–2001
Peter King	Liberal	2001–2004
Peter King	Independent	2004–2004
Malcolm Turnbull	Liberal	2004–2018
Kerryn Phelps	Independent	2018–2019
Dave Sharma	Liberal	2019–2022
Allegra Spender	Independent	2022–present

== Election results ==
=== Elections in the 2020s ===
==== 2025 ====
2025 Australian federal election: Wentworth
Party	Candidate	Votes	%	±%
Independent	Allegra Spender	40,284	36.48	+7.22
Liberal	Ro Knox	40,155	36.36	−1.17
Labor	Savanna Peake	14,779	13.38	−4.35
Greens	Nick Ward	11,241	10.18	−0.53
One Nation	James Sternhell	2,625	2.38	+1.17
Independent	Michael Richmond	1,347	1.22	+1.22
Total formal votes		110,431	97.26	−0.12
Informal votes		3,106	2.74	+0.12
Turnout		113,537	89.07	+0.50
Notional two-party-preferred count
Labor	Savanna Peake	55,829	50.56	+1.72
Liberal	Ro Knox	54,602	49.44	−1.72
Two-candidate-preferred result
Independent	Allegra Spender	64,429	58.34	+8.92
Liberal	Ro Knox	46,002	41.66	−8.92
Independent notional gain from Liberal (Note: Independent Allegra Spender has held this seat since 2022, meaning the result is an Independent hold. 'Notional gain' refers to the two-party preferred result, which does not have an effect on the election and is merely informative.)		Swing	+8.92	

==== 2022 ====
2022 Australian federal election: Wentworth
Party	Candidate	Votes	%	±%
Liberal	Dave Sharma	35,995	40.48	−6.96
Independent	Allegra Spender	31,810	35.77	+35.77
Labor	Tim Murray	9,654	10.86	−0.09
Greens	Dominic Wy Kanak	7,410	8.33	+0.80
United Australia	Natalie Dumer	1,813	2.04	+1.34
Liberal Democrats	Daniel Lewkovitz	1,346	1.51	+1.51
One Nation	Dean Fisher	895	1.01	+1.01
Total formal votes		88,923	97.50	+0.49
Informal votes		2,277	2.50	−0.49
Turnout		91,200	87.93	−1.47
Notional two-party-preferred count
Liberal	Dave Sharma	49,727	55.92	−3.93
Labor	Tim Murray	39,196	44.08	+3.93
Two-candidate-preferred result
Independent	Allegra Spender	48,186	54.19	+54.19
Liberal	Dave Sharma	40,737	45.81	−5.50
Independent gain from Liberal				

Alluvial diagram for preference flows in the seat of Wentworth in the 2022 federal election. indicates at what stage the winning candidate had over 50% of the votes and was declared the winner.

=== Elections in the 2010s ===
==== 2019 ====
2019 Australian federal election: Wentworth
Party	Candidate	Votes	%	±%
Liberal	Dave Sharma	42,575	47.44	−14.82
Independent	Kerryn Phelps	29,109	32.43	+32.43
Labor	Tim Murray	9,824	10.95	−6.78
Greens	Dominic Wy Kanak	6,759	7.53	−7.33
United Australia	Michael Bloomfield	625	0.70	+0.70
Independent	Matthew Drake-Brockman	516	0.57	+0.57
Christian Democrats	Paul Treacy	346	0.39	−0.68
Total formal votes		89,754	97.01	+2.14
Informal votes		2,771	2.99	−2.14
Turnout		92,525	89.40	+3.16
Notional two-party-preferred count
Liberal	Dave Sharma	53,716	59.85	−7.90
Labor	Tim Murray	36,038	40.15	+7.90
Two-candidate-preferred result
Liberal	Dave Sharma	46,050	51.31	−16.44
Independent	Kerryn Phelps	43,704	48.69	+48.69
Liberal hold		Swing	−16.44	

Malcolm Turnbull (Liberal) had won the seat at the 2016 election, however he resigned in 2018 and Kerryn Phelps (Independent) won the seat at the resulting by-election.

==== 2018 by-election ====
2018 Wentworth by-election
Party	Candidate	Votes	%	±%
Liberal	Dave Sharma	32,795	43.08	−19.18
Independent	Kerryn Phelps	22,219	29.19	+29.19
Labor	Tim Murray	8,777	11.53	−6.20
Greens	Dominic Wy Kanak	6,543	8.59	−6.27
Independent	Licia Heath	1,721	2.26	+2.26
Small Business	Angela Vithoulkas	822	1.08	+1.08
Science	Andrea Leong	516	0.68	−0.49
Voluntary Euthanasia	Shayne Higson	493	0.65	+0.65
Animal Justice	Deb Doyle	421	0.55	+0.55
Sustainable Australia	Kay Dunne	413	0.54	+0.54
Katter's Australian	Robert Callanan (disendorsed)	381	0.50	+0.50
Liberal Democrats	Samuel Gunning	351	0.46	+0.46
Arts	Barry Keldoulis	305	0.40	−1.36
Liberty Alliance	Tony Robinson	154	0.20	+0.20
Justice	Ben Forsyth	133	0.17	+0.17
People's Party	Steven Georgantis	82	0.11	+0.11
Total formal votes		76,126	93.92	−0.95
Informal votes		4,928	6.08	+0.95
Turnout		81,054	78.13	−8.11
Notional two-party-preferred count
Liberal	Dave Sharma	46,244	60.75	–7.00
Labor	Tim Murray	29,882	39.25	+7.00
Two-candidate-preferred result
Independent	Kerryn Phelps	38,988	51.22	+51.22
Liberal	Dave Sharma	37,138	48.78	−18.96
Independent gain from Liberal		Swing	N/A	

==== 2016 ====
2016 Australian federal election: Wentworth
Party	Candidate	Votes	%	±%
Liberal	Malcolm Turnbull	52,353	62.26	−2.35
Labor	Evan Hughes	14,913	17.73	−0.98
Greens	Dejay Toborek	12,496	14.86	+0.84
Arts	Anthony Ackroyd	1,478	1.76	+1.76
Science	Peter Xing	988	1.17	+1.17
Christian Democrats	Beresford Thomas	901	1.07	+0.62
Independent	David Allen	573	0.68	+0.68
Independent	Marc Aussie-Stone	390	0.46	+0.46
Total formal votes		84,092	94.87	+0.60
Informal votes		4,549	5.13	−0.60
Turnout		88,641	86.24	−3.76
Two-party-preferred result
Liberal	Malcolm Turnbull	56,971	67.75	−1.17
Labor	Evan Hughes	27,121	32.25	+1.17
Liberal hold		Swing	−1.17	

==== 2013 ====
2013 Australian federal election: Wentworth
Party	Candidate	Votes	%	±%
Liberal	Malcolm Turnbull	58,306	63.32	+3.75
Labor	Di Smith	17,840	19.37	−1.70
Greens	Matthew Robertson	13,455	14.61	−2.83
Independent	Pat Sheil	1,054	1.14	+0.55
Palmer United	Marsha Foxman	998	1.08	+1.08
Christian Democrats	Beresford Thomas	431	0.47	+0.47
Total formal votes		92,084	94.30	−1.20
Informal votes		5,564	5.70	+1.20
Turnout		97,648	89.30	−0.17
Two-party-preferred result
Liberal	Malcolm Turnbull	62,359	67.72	+2.86
Labor	Di Smith	29,725	32.28	−2.86
Liberal hold		Swing	+2.86	

==== 2010 ====
2010 Australian federal election: Wentworth
Party	Candidate	Votes	%	±%
Liberal	Malcolm Turnbull	51,634	59.57	+9.20
Labor	Steven Lewis	18,265	21.07	−9.41
Greens	Matthew Robertson	15,114	17.44	+2.48
Independent	Pat Sheil	515	0.59	+0.29
Independent	Malcolm Duncan	484	0.56	+0.56
Carers Alliance	Stuart Neal	389	0.45	+0.45
Secular	John August	275	0.32	+0.32
Total formal votes		86,676	95.50	+0.40
Informal votes		4,085	4.50	−0.40
Turnout		90,761	89.45	−3.08
Two-party-preferred result
Liberal	Malcolm Turnbull	56,219	64.86	+11.01
Labor	Steven Lewis	30,457	35.14	−11.01
Liberal hold		Swing	+11.01	

=== Elections in the 2000s ===
==== 2007 ====
2007 Australian federal election: Wentworth
Party	Candidate	Votes	%	±%
Liberal	Malcolm Turnbull	44,463	50.37	+10.10
Labor	George Newhouse	26,903	30.48	+1.55
Greens	Susan Jarnason	13,205	14.96	+2.10
Climate Change	Dixie Coulton	1,156	1.31	+1.31
Independent	Dani Ecuyer	774	0.88	+0.88
Democrats	Pierce Field	721	0.82	−0.28
Christian Democrats	Bradley Molony	323	0.37	+0.37
Independent	Pat Sheil	265	0.30	+0.06
Family First	James Adams	255	0.29	−0.04
Liberty & Democracy	Jonatan Kelu	129	0.15	+0.15
Citizens Electoral Council	John Jamieson	78	0.09	−0.01
Total formal votes		88,272	95.10	+1.05
Informal votes		4,548	4.90	−1.05
Turnout		92,820	92.56	−0.54
Two-party-preferred result
Liberal	Malcolm Turnbull	47,538	53.85	+1.34
Labor	George Newhouse	40,734	46.15	−1.34
Liberal hold		Swing	+1.34	

==== 2004 ====
2004 Australian federal election: Wentworth
Party	Candidate	Votes	%	±%
Liberal	Malcolm Turnbull	30,771	41.79	−10.29
Labor	David Patch	19,391	26.34	−3.18
Independent	Peter King	13,236	17.98	+17.98
Greens	Mithra Cox	8,210	11.15	+1.38
Democrats	Lindy Morrison	683	0.93	−5.22
Independent	Robert Vogler	339	0.46	+0.46
Family First	Leonie Hull	301	0.41	+0.41
Fishing Party	Victor Shen	239	0.32	+0.32
Independent	Pat Sheil	218	0.30	+0.30
No GST	Brian Buckley	171	0.23	+0.23
Citizens Electoral Council	John Jamieson	65	0.09	+0.09
Total formal votes		73,624	93.82	−1.33
Informal votes		4,853	6.18	+1.33
Turnout		78,477	92.34	+0.61
Two-party-preferred result
Liberal	Malcolm Turnbull	40,847	55.48	−2.38
Labor	David Patch	32,777	44.52	+2.38
Liberal hold		Swing	−2.38	

==== 2001 ====
2001 Australian federal election: Wentworth
Party	Candidate	Votes	%	±%
Liberal	Peter King	39,298	52.08	+1.99
Labor	Carolyn Neilson	22,277	29.52	−3.49
Greens	Alison Lyssa	7,371	9.77	+4.88
Democrats	Margaret Collings	4,639	6.15	+0.11
One Nation	Aub Golden	1,233	1.63	−1.00
Unity	Alan Jacobs	642	0.85	+0.85
Total formal votes		75,460	95.15	−1.20
Informal votes		3,845	4.85	+1.20
Turnout		79,305	92.29	
Two-party-preferred result
Liberal	Peter King	43,660	57.86	+0.49
Labor	Carolyn Neilson	31,800	42.14	−0.49
Liberal hold		Swing	+0.49	

=== Elections in the 1990s ===
==== 1998 ====
1998 Australian federal election: Wentworth
Party	Candidate	Votes	%	±%
Liberal	Andrew Thomson	36,348	49.75	−2.25
Labor	Paul Pearce	24,198	33.12	+1.32
Democrats	Margaret Collings	4,470	6.12	−2.55
Greens	Tom McLoughlin	3,592	4.92	−1.04
One Nation	Waverney Ford	2,004	2.74	+2.74
Unity	Alan Jacobs	1,978	2.71	+2.71
Natural Law	Dezi Koster	467	0.64	+0.34
Total formal votes		73,057	96.35	−0.20
Informal votes		2,771	3.65	+0.20
Turnout		75,828	91.95	−3.46
Two-party-preferred result
Liberal	Andrew Thomson	41,147	56.32	−1.51
Labor	Paul Pearce	31,910	43.68	+1.51
Liberal hold		Swing	−1.51	

==== 1996 ====
1996 Australian federal election: Wentworth
Party	Candidate	Votes	%	±%
Liberal	Andrew Thomson	39,014	52.01	−0.66
Labor	Paul Pearce	23,856	31.80	−5.01
Democrats	Di Happ	6,506	8.67	+5.89
Greens	Fiona McCrossin	4,468	5.96	+5.96
Independent	Rodney Marks	468	0.62	+0.62
Independent	David Synnott	358	0.48	+0.48
Natural Law	Paddy Engelen	225	0.30	+0.30
	John Hooper	122	0.16	+0.16
Total formal votes		75,017	96.55	−0.55
Informal votes		2,684	3.45	+0.55
Turnout		77,701	95.41	+0.86
Two-party-preferred result
Liberal	Andrew Thomson	43,122	57.83	+2.37
Labor	Paul Pearce	31,445	42.17	−2.37
Liberal hold		Swing	+2.37	

==== 1995 by-election ====
1995 Wentworth by-election
Party	Candidate	Votes	%	±%
Liberal	Andrew Thomson	30,677	52.84	+0.17
Greens	Murray Matson	15,120	26.04	+26.04
Independent	Bill Wentworth	10,945	18.85	+18.85
	John Hooper	1,317	2.27	+2.27
Total formal votes		58,059	96.04	−1.06
Informal votes		2,392	3.96	+1.06
Turnout		60,451	76.64	−17.91
Two-party-preferred result
Liberal	Andrew Thomson	38,261	65.90	+10.36
Greens	Murray Matson	19,798	34.10	+34.10
Liberal hold		Swing	+10.36	

==== 1993 ====
1993 Australian federal election: Wentworth
Party	Candidate	Votes	%	±%
Liberal	John Hewson	38,850	52.67	+5.46
Labor	Paul Pearce	27,146	36.81	+4.64
Eastern Suburbs Greens	Ben Oquist	4,350	5.90	+5.90
Democrats	Armon Hicks	2,055	2.79	−6.80
Independent	Susan Durovic	598	0.81	+0.81
Natural Law	Patricia Boland	503	0.68	+0.68
	Zanny Begg	253	0.34	+0.34
Total formal votes		73,765	97.09	+0.13
Informal votes		2,209	2.91	−0.13
Turnout		75,974	94.55	
Two-party-preferred result
Liberal	John Hewson	40,891	55.46	+0.67
Labor	Paul Pearce	32,843	44.54	−0.67
Liberal hold		Swing	+0.67	

==== 1990 ====
1990 Australian federal election: Wentworth
Party	Candidate	Votes	%	±%
Liberal	John Hewson	29,653	51.0	−3.6
Labor	Dimitri Tsingris	15,792	27.1	−7.2
Democrats	Estelle Myers	6,603	11.3	+0.2
Greens	Geoff Ash	5,357	9.2	+9.2
Independent	James Reid	779	1.3	+1.3
Total formal votes		58,184	97.9	
Informal votes		1,763	2.9	
Turnout		59,947	92.2	
Two-party-preferred result
Liberal	John Hewson	33,216	57.2	−0.8
Labor	Dimitri Tsingris	24,809	42.8	+0.8
Liberal hold		Swing	−0.8	

=== Elections in the 1980s ===
==== 1987 ====
1987 Australian federal election: Wentworth
Party	Candidate	Votes	%	±%
Liberal	John Hewson	32,099	54.6	+2.7
Labor	Anne-Maree Whitaker	20,181	34.3	−2.0
Democrats	Yvonne Jayawardena	6,533	11.1	+3.4
Total formal votes		58,813	95.0	
Informal votes		3,116	5.0	
Turnout		61,929	89.9	
Two-party-preferred result
Liberal	John Hewson	34,101	58.0	+1.7
Labor	Anne-Maree Whitaker	24,695	42.0	−1.7
Liberal hold		Swing	+1.7	

==== 1984 ====
1984 Australian federal election: Wentworth
Party	Candidate	Votes	%	±%
Liberal	Peter Coleman	30,389	51.9	+3.9
Labor	Stephen Rothman	21,252	36.3	−5.3
Democrats	Yvonne Jayawardena	4,478	7.7	+3.4
Independent	George Warnecke	1,591	2.7	+2.7
Independent	George Atkinson	410	0.7	+0.7
Independent	Roy Oakes	242	0.4	+0.4
Independent	Kusala Fitzroy-Mendis	162	0.3	+0.3
Total formal votes		58,524	92.9	
Informal votes		4,441	7.1	
Turnout		62,965	89.4	
Two-party-preferred result
Liberal	Peter Coleman	32,902	56.3	+0.6
Labor	Stephen Rothman	25,587	43.7	−0.6
Liberal hold		Swing	+0.6	

==== 1983 ====
1983 Australian federal election: Wentworth
Party	Candidate	Votes	%	±%
Liberal	Peter Coleman	31,759	54.7	−5.8
Labor	Max Pearce	20,301	34.9	+1.6
Independent	Katherine Wentworth	2,787	4.8	+4.8
Democrats	Brian Hillman	2,474	4.3	−1.9
Independent	George Warnecke	401	0.7	+0.7
Independent	Robert McCarthy	251	0.4	+0.4
Independent	Neil Roberts	115	0.2	+0.2
Total formal votes		58,088	97.3	
Informal votes		1,591	2.7	
Turnout		59,679	91.3	
Two-party-preferred result
Liberal	Peter Coleman		62.4	−0.6
Labor	Max Pearce		37.6	+0.6
Liberal hold		Swing	−0.6	

==== 1981 by-election ====
1981 Wentworth by-election
Party	Candidate	Votes	%	±%
Liberal	Peter Coleman	22,736	48.1	−12.4
Labor	Robert Tickner	16,637	35.2	+1.9
Independent Liberal	Katherine Wentworth	4,923	10.4	+10.4
Democrats	Joan Kersey	2,186	4.6	−1.6
Independent	Alfred Bussell	534	1.1	+1.1
Independent	William More	176	0.4	+0.4
Independent	Walker Roach	92	0.2	+0.2
Total formal votes		47,284	97.2	
Informal votes		1,349	2.8	
Turnout		48,633	69.5	
Two-party-preferred result
Liberal	Peter Coleman		59.6	−3.4
Labor	Robert Tickner		40.4	+3.4
Liberal hold		Swing	−3.4	

==== 1980 ====
1980 Australian federal election: Wentworth
Party	Candidate	Votes	%	±%
Liberal	Bob Ellicott	36,426	60.5	+3.0
Labor	Stephen McGoldrick	20,086	33.3	+1.9
Democrats	Joan Kersey	3,746	6.2	−1.9
Total formal votes		60,258	97.5	
Informal votes		1,540	2.5	
Turnout		61,798	88.5	
Two-party-preferred result
Liberal	Bob Ellicott		63.0	−1.4
Labor	Stephen McGoldrick		37.0	+1.4
Liberal hold		Swing	−1.4	

=== Elections in the 1970s ===
==== 1977 ====
1977 Australian federal election: Wentworth
Party	Candidate	Votes	%	±%
Liberal	Bob Ellicott	35,980	57.5	−0.4
Labor	Michael Winters	19,638	31.4	−5.3
Democrats	Joan Kersey	5,069	8.1	+8.1
Progress	John Curvers	1,909	3.0	−0.9
Total formal votes		62,596	97.5	
Informal votes		1,608	2.5	
Turnout		64,204	90.1	
Two-party-preferred result
Liberal	Bob Ellicott		64.4	+2.6
Labor	Michael Winters		35.6	−2.6
Liberal hold		Swing	+2.6	

==== 1975 ====
1975 Australian federal election: Wentworth
Party	Candidate	Votes	%	±%
Liberal	Bob Ellicott	34,537	65.7	+3.9
Labor	Mairi Petersen	15,224	28.9	−4.7
Workers	John Curvers	2,058	3.9	+3.9
Australia	Joseph Zingarelli	788	1.5	−3.1
Total formal votes		52,607	98.0	
Informal votes		1,059	2.0	
Turnout		53,666	92.4	
Two-party-preferred result
Liberal	Bob Ellicott		69.6	+6.0
Labor	Mairi Petersen		30.4	−6.0
Liberal hold		Swing	+6.0	

==== 1974 ====
1974 Australian federal election: Wentworth
Party	Candidate	Votes	%	±%
Liberal	Bob Ellicott	30,677	61.8	+8.6
Labor	Paul Hawcroft	16,665	33.6	−3.1
Australia	Julia Featherstone	2,274	4.6	−2.8
Total formal votes		49,616	98.3	
Informal votes		859	1.7	
Turnout		50,475	94.2	
Two-party-preferred result
Liberal	Bob Ellicott		63.6	+5.3
Labor	Paul Hawcroft		36.4	−5.3
Liberal hold		Swing	+5.3	

==== 1972 ====
1972 Australian federal election: Wentworth
Party	Candidate	Votes	%	±%
Liberal	Les Bury	25,612	53.2	−4.4
Labor	Percy Allan	17,663	36.7	+2.5
Australia	Helen Arbib	3,550	7.4	+7.4
Democratic Labor	Dominique Droulers	1,310	2.7	−0.9
Total formal votes		48,135	97.9	
Informal votes		1,036	2.1	
Turnout		49,171	92.5	
Two-party-preferred result
Liberal	Les Bury		58.3	−5.2
Labor	Percy Allan		41.7	+5.2
Liberal hold		Swing	−5.2	

=== Elections in the 1960s ===
==== 1969 ====
1969 Australian federal election: Wentworth
Party	Candidate	Votes	%	±%
Liberal	Les Bury	28,935	57.6	−6.4
Labor	Frederick Cross	17,151	34.2	+4.8
Democratic Labor	Doris Brown	1,820	3.6	−0.6
Independent	Geoff Mullen	1,345	2.7	+2.7
Pensioner Power	Neville Yeomans	951	1.9	+1.9
Total formal votes		50,202	96.9	
Informal votes		1,598	3.1	
Turnout		51,800	90.5	
Two-party-preferred result
Liberal	Les Bury		63.5	−4.9
Labor	Frederick Cross		36.5	+4.9
Liberal hold		Swing	−4.9	

==== 1966 ====
1966 Australian federal election: Wentworth
Party	Candidate	Votes	%	±%
Liberal	Les Bury	26,601	75.1	+2.0
Labor	Kerry Sibraa	6,471	18.3	−5.6
Democratic Labor	Doris Brown	1,489	4.2	+4.2
Independent	Brian King	527	1.5	+1.5
Communist	Jack Mundey	334	0.9	+0.9
Total formal votes		35,422	95.8	
Informal votes		1,539	4.2	
Turnout		36,961	91.4	
Two-party-preferred result
Liberal	Les Bury		79.5	+4.4
Labor	Kerry Sibraa		20.5	−4.4
Liberal hold		Swing	+4.4	

==== 1963 ====
1963 Australian federal election: Wentworth
Party	Candidate	Votes	%	±%
Liberal	Les Bury	27,485	73.1	+10.6
Labor	Nell Simpson	8,991	23.9	−4.6
Independent	Arthur Bergman	1,140	3.0	+3.0
Total formal votes		37,616	98.0	
Informal votes		763	2.0	
Turnout		38,379	93.1	
Two-party-preferred result
Liberal	Les Bury		75.1	+5.2
Labor	Nell Simpson		24.9	−5.2
Liberal hold		Swing	+5.2	

==== 1961 ====
1961 Australian federal election: Wentworth
Party	Candidate	Votes	%	±%
Liberal	Les Bury	23,084	62.5	−6.7
Labor	John Hirshman	10,536	28.5	+5.3
Democratic Labor	Francis Bull	3,313	9.0	+1.4
Total formal votes		36,933	97.4	
Informal votes		999	2.6	
Turnout		37,932	93.5	
Two-party-preferred result
Liberal	Les Bury		69.9	−5.4
Labor	John Hirshman		30.1	+5.4
Liberal hold		Swing	−5.4	

=== Elections in the 1950s ===
==== 1958 ====
1958 Australian federal election: Wentworth
Party	Candidate	Votes	%	±%
Liberal	Les Bury	26,823	69.2	−2.8
Labor	Sydney Davis	8,816	23.2	+23.2
Democratic Labor	John Gillian	2,892	7.6	+7.6
Total formal votes		38,031	97.1	
Informal votes		1,156	2.9	
Turnout		39,187	93.8	
Two-party-preferred result
Liberal	Les Bury		75.3	+3.3
Labor	Sydney Davis		24.7	+24.7
Liberal hold		Swing	+3.3	

==== 1956 by-election ====
1956 Wentworth by-election
Party	Candidate	Votes	%	±%
Liberal	Les Bury	13,956	41.3	−30.7
Labor	Kevin Starr	6,455	19.1	+19.1
Independent Liberal	Reg Robson	6,414	19.0	+19.0
Independent Liberal	Reg Bartley	4,109	12.2	+12.2
Independent	Cecil Sindel	1,470	4.3	+4.3
Independent Liberal	Alan Laing	1,414	4.2	+4.2
Total formal votes		33,818	96.7	
Informal votes		1,167	3.3	
Turnout		34,985	81.5	
Two-party-preferred result
Liberal	Les Bury	17,460	51.6	−20.4
Independent	Reg Robson	16,358	48.4	+48.4
Liberal hold		Swing	−20.4	

==== 1955 ====
1955 Australian federal election: Wentworth
Party	Candidate	Votes	%	±%
Liberal	Sir Eric Harrison	28,009	72.0	−28.0
Independent	Hal Lashwood	10,896	28.0	+28.0
Total formal votes		38,905	96.8	
Informal votes		1,283	3.2	
Turnout		40,188	92.3	
Liberal hold		Swing	−28.0	

==== 1954 ====
1954 Australian federal election: Wentworth
Party	Candidate	Votes	%	±%
Liberal	Sir Eric Harrison	unopposed		
Liberal hold		Swing		

==== 1951 ====
1951 Australian federal election: Wentworth
Party	Candidate	Votes	%	±%
Liberal	Eric Harrison	28,127	75.7	+0.6
Labor	Cecil Trevelyan	9,041	24.3	−0.6
Total formal votes		37,168	98.4	
Informal votes		614	1.6	
Turnout		37,782	95.3	
Liberal hold		Swing	+0.6	

=== Elections in the 1940s ===
==== 1949 ====
1949 Australian federal election: Wentworth
Party	Candidate	Votes	%	±%
Liberal	Eric Harrison	28,821	75.1	+7.9
Labor	William McKell	9,533	24.9	−5.5
Total formal votes		38,354	98.2	
Informal votes		703	1.8	
Turnout		39,057	96.1	
Liberal hold		Swing	+6.8	

==== 1946 ====
1946 Australian federal election: Wentworth
Party	Candidate	Votes	%	±%
Liberal	Eric Harrison	40,790	54.3	+21.4
Labor	Jessie Street	31,432	41.8	−1.7
Lang Labor	Charles Walsh	2,898	3.9	+3.9
Total formal votes		75,120	98.0	
Informal votes		1,501	2.0	
Turnout		76,621	93.8	
Two-party-preferred result
Liberal	Eric Harrison		55.3	+3.7
Labor	Jessie Street		44.7	−3.7
Liberal hold		Swing	+3.7	

==== 1943 ====
1943 Australian federal election: Wentworth
Party	Candidate	Votes	%	±%
Labor	Jessie Street	31,048	43.5	+20.4
United Australia	Eric Harrison	23,519	32.9	−32.7
National Government	Bill Wentworth	14,875	20.8	+20.8
Liberal Democratic	Charles Mayo	1,654	2.3	+2.3
Independent	Thomas Whitehouse	311	0.4	+0.4
Total formal votes		71,407	97.4	
Informal votes		1,897	2.6	
Turnout		73,304	98.5	
Two-party-preferred result
United Australia	Eric Harrison	36,871	51.6	−14.2
Labor	Jessie Street	34,536	48.4	+14.2
United Australia hold		Swing	−14.2	

==== 1940 ====
1940 Australian federal election: Wentworth
Party	Candidate	Votes	%	±%
United Australia	Eric Harrison	26,969	43.0	−1.8
Labor	Norman Smith	14,500	23.1	−9.5
United Australia	Norman Cowper	13,099	20.9	+20.9
State Labor	Jim Morley	6,249	10.0	+10.0
United Australia	Richard Stranger	1,062	1.7	+1.7
Ind. Nationalist	George McDonald	771	1.2	+1.2
Total formal votes		62,650	96.7	
Informal votes		2,139	3.3	
Turnout		64,789	94.5	
Two-party-preferred result
United Australia	Eric Harrison	41,218	65.8	−1.6
Labor	Norman Smith	21,432	34.2	+1.6
United Australia hold		Swing	−1.6	

=== Elections in the 1930s ===
==== 1937 ====
1937 Australian federal election: Wentworth
Party	Candidate	Votes	%	±%
United Australia	Eric Harrison	40,398	67.4	+1.7
Labor	Thomas Conway	19,499	32.6	+32.6
Total formal votes		59,897	97.8	
Informal votes		1,343	2.2	
Turnout		61,240	96.1	
United Australia hold		Swing	−3.6	

==== 1934 ====
1934 Australian federal election: Wentworth
Party	Candidate	Votes	%	±%
United Australia	Eric Harrison	34,012	65.7	−34.3
Labor (NSW)	James Ormonde	13,287	25.7	+25.7
Social Credit	Ralph Fretwell	4,466	8.6	+8.6
Total formal votes		51,765	97.6	
Informal votes		1,296	2.4	
Turnout		53,061	95.6	
Two-party-preferred result
United Australia	Eric Harrison		71.0	+5.2
Labor (NSW)	James Ormonde		29.0	+29.0
United Australia hold		Swing	+5.2	

==== 1931 ====
1931 Australian federal election: Wentworth
Party	Candidate	Votes	%	±%
United Australia	Eric Harrison	35,460	65.8	+65.8
United Australia	Walter Marks	18,434	34.2	+34.2
Total formal votes		53,894	94.2	
Informal votes		3,293	5.8	
Turnout		57,187	92.8	
United Australia gain from Ind. Nationalist		Swing	+58.3	

=== Elections in the 1920s ===
==== 1929 ====
1929 Australian federal election: Wentworth
Party	Candidate	Votes	%	±%
Ind. Nationalist	Walter Marks	31,991	58.3	+58.3
Nationalist	Arthur Manning	22,878	41.7	−19.8
Total formal votes		54,869	96.5	
Informal votes		1,982	3.5	
Turnout		56,851	94.0	
Ind. Nationalist gain from Nationalist		Swing	+19.8	

==== 1928 ====
1928 Australian federal election: Wentworth
Party	Candidate	Votes	%	±%
Nationalist	Walter Marks	29,639	61.5	−2.9
Labor	Bob O'Halloran	18,539	38.5	+2.9
Total formal votes		48,178	95.7	
Informal votes		2,161	4.3	
Turnout		50,339	89.7	
Nationalist hold		Swing	−2.9	

==== 1925 ====
1925 Australian federal election: Wentworth
Party	Candidate	Votes	%	±%
Nationalist	Walter Marks	27,945	64.4	+14.7
Labor	William Crick	15,436	35.6	+3.0
Total formal votes		43,381	98.2	
Informal votes		790	1.8	
Turnout		44,171	87.7	
Nationalist hold		Swing	+2.5	

==== 1922 ====
1922 Australian federal election: Wentworth
Party	Candidate	Votes	%	±%
Nationalist	Walter Marks	9,843	49.7	−11.4
Labor	William Fitzgerald	6,455	32.6	−6.3
Ind. Nationalist	Henry Morton	3,502	17.7	+17.7
Total formal votes		19,800	96.2	
Informal votes		776	3.8	
Turnout		20,575	50.4	
Two-party-preferred result
Nationalist	Walter Marks	12,251	61.9	+0.8
Labor	William Fitzgerald	7,549	38.1	−0.8
Nationalist hold		Swing	+0.8	

=== Elections in the 1910s ===
==== 1919 ====
1919 Australian federal election: Wentworth
Party	Candidate	Votes	%	±%
Nationalist	Walter Marks	20,768	61.5	−7.0
Labor	James Dunn	12,998	38.5	+7.0
Total formal votes		33,766	98.3	
Informal votes		595	1.7	
Turnout		34,361	63.9	
Nationalist hold		Swing	−7.0	

==== 1917 ====
1917 Australian federal election: Wentworth
Party	Candidate	Votes	%	±%
Nationalist	Willie Kelly	22,653	68.5	+12.0
Labor	Henrietta Greville	10,437	31.5	−12.0
Total formal votes		33,090	96.1	
Informal votes		1,340	3.9	
Turnout		64,430	67.4	
Nationalist hold		Swing	+12.0	

==== 1914 ====
1914 Australian federal election: Wentworth
Party	Candidate	Votes	%	±%
Liberal	Willie Kelly	17,079	56.5	−5.2
Labor	Robert Cruickshank	13,171	43.5	+5.2
Total formal votes		30,250	97.5	
Informal votes		790	2.5	
Turnout		31,040	63.9	
Liberal hold		Swing	−5.2	

==== 1913 ====
1913 Australian federal election: Wentworth
Party	Candidate	Votes	%	±%
Liberal	Willie Kelly	18,375	61.7	+0.0
Labor	Sydney Green	11,386	38.3	-0.0
Total formal votes		29,761	97.1	
Informal votes		877	2.9	
Turnout		30,638	71.2	
Liberal hold		Swing	+0.0	

==== 1910 ====
1910 Australian federal election: Wentworth
Party	Candidate	Votes	%	±%
Liberal	Willie Kelly	11,641	61.0	−12.2
Labour	Arthur Vernon	7,451	39.0	+12.2
Total formal votes		19,092	98.7	
Informal votes		257	1.3	
Turnout		19,349	53.8	
Liberal hold		Swing	−12.2	

=== Elections in the 1900s ===
==== 1906 ====
1906 Australian federal election: Wentworth
Party	Candidate	Votes	%	±%
Anti-Socialist	Willie Kelly	10,505	73.2	+1.4
Labour	William Duncan	3,846	26.8	+26.8
Total formal votes		14,351	95.3	
Informal votes		701	4.7	
Turnout		15,052	52.8	
Anti-Socialist hold		Swing	+1.4	

==== 1903 ====
1903 Australian federal election: Wentworth
Party	Candidate	Votes	%	±%
Free Trade	Willie Kelly	13,894	71.8	+3.4
Protectionist	John Dalley	5,459	28.2	−3.4
Total formal votes		19,353	98.5	
Informal votes		286	1.5	
Turnout		19,639	62.6	
Free Trade hold		Swing	+3.4	

==== 1901 ====
1901 Australian federal election: Wentworth
Party	Candidate	Votes	%	±%
Free Trade	Sir William McMillan	6,315	68.4	+68.4
Protectionist	John Gannon	2,915	31.6	+31.6
Total formal votes		9,230	98.4	
Informal votes		153	1.6	
Turnout		9,383	70.0	
Free Trade win		(new seat)		
