= Joan Kersey =

Joan Sophia Kersey, née Walder (6 October 1926 – 2013) was an Australian writer, social worker and left-wing activist.

Her parents, Arthur Walder and Millie, née Bowen, were part of a prominent and wealthy family; her uncle Sir Samuel was Lord Mayor of Sydney in 1932 and later served as a United Australia Party member of the New South Wales Legislative Council. Sir William McMahon, Prime Minister from 1971 to 1972, was one of her cousins. She received a Bachelor of Arts in 1947 from the University of Sydney and a diploma in social studies in 1950. In 1952 she married Royal Navy officer Michael Kersey, and moved around with him to Scotland, Malta and New Zealand; on his retirement, they settled in Armidale to manage a grazing property. There Kersey became involved in organisations such as the Save the Children Fund, Family Planning, and Zero Population Growth, and joined the Australia Party, forerunner of the Australian Democrats.

Kersey stood as the Australia Party's candidate at the 1973 Armidale by-election for the New South Wales Legislative Assembly. After her separation from her husband, Kersey moved back to Sydney and became involved in the nuclear disarmament, women's rights and conservation movements. She ran three times for the House of Representatives seat of Wentworth for the Democrats, in 1977, 1980, and the 1981 by-election. Kersey was also a Democrat candidate for the New South Wales Legislative Council at the 1978 election.

After retiring from social work she studied at the University of New England and gained a Master of Letters. Kersey published four books: High Society: The Legalisation of Illicit Drugs (1994), The New Aged: An Untapped Resource (1997), 2050: A Drug Odyssey (2002), and her autobiography, My Life: While Busy Making Other Plans (2006). A member of the New South Wales Council for Civil Liberties, the Australian Drug Law Reform Foundation, Amnesty International, Justice Action, the Friends of the United Nations, and Community Action Abroad, her activism continued into her 70s and 80s, campaigning for a republic and a carbon price and against the Iraq War and the treatment of refugees. In her later years she supported the Australian Greens. Kersey died in 2013.
