= List of electoral divisions in Tasmania =

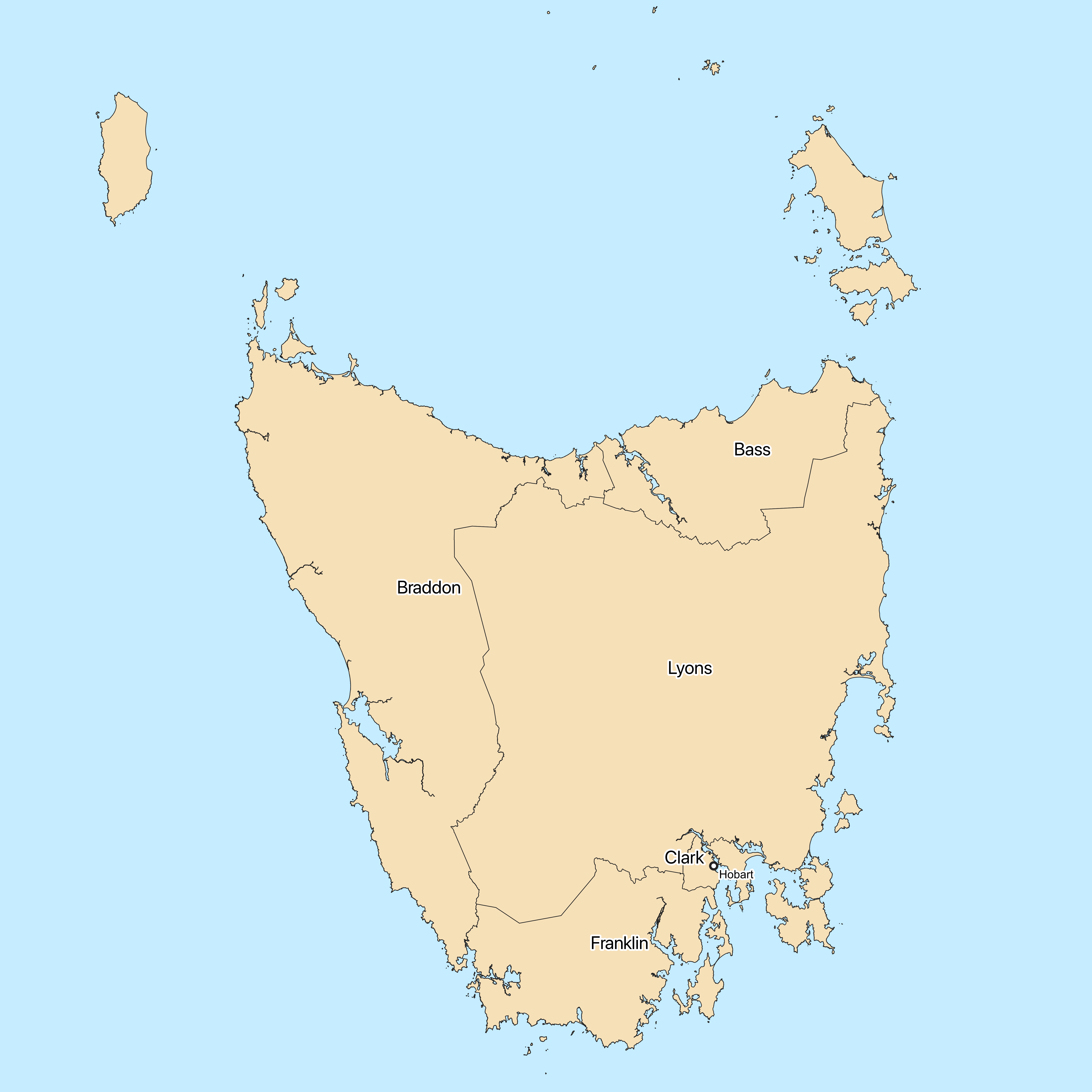
Tasmanian federal and state electoral divisions since 2017. They are next due to be redistributed in 2025.

The Australian state of Tasmania is divided into five electoral divisions for the purposes of electing the Australian House of Representatives in Canberra. Each division elects one Member of Parliament. At the 2025 federal election, Tasmania elected four Labor MPs, and one independent MP.

As an original state Tasmania is guaranteed a minimum of 5 seats. Given its relatively small population, this means it have one representative per ~70,000 voters, compared to Victoria's representation of one seat vs ~100,000 voters.

== Divisions ==
Name	Formed	Size (km^{2})	Classification	Current Member	Member's Party	Reference
Bass	1903	7,976	Provincial	Jess Teesdale	Labor	
Braddon	1955	21,369	Rural	Anne Urquhart	Labor	
Clark	2019	292	Inner-metropolitan	Andrew Wilkie	Independent	
Franklin	1903	10,009	Outer-metropolitan	Julie Collins	Labor	
Lyons	1984	35,722	Rural	Rebecca White	Labor	

== See also ==
- Parliament of Tasmania
