= 1990 Liberal Party of Australia leadership election =

Australian political party leadership election

Liberal Party of Australia leadership election, 1990
- 3 April 1990

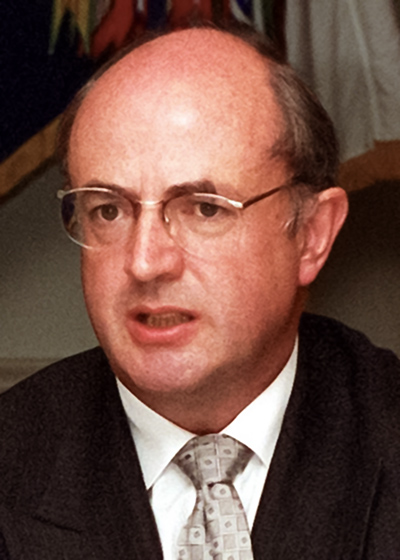
| | | | LIB |
| Candidate | John Hewson | Peter Reith | Alasdair Webster |
| Caucus vote | 62 | 13 | 5 |
| Percentage | 75.5% | 16.2% | 8.3% |
| Seat | Wentworth (NSW) | Flinders (Vic.) | Macquarie (NSW) |
Leader before election
Andrew Peacock
Elected Leader
John Hewson

A spill of the leadership of the Liberal Party of Australia took place on 3 April 1990, following the defeat of the Liberal Party at the federal election five days earlier. The spill was won by John Hewson over Peter Reith by 62 votes to 13. Reith was then elected deputy leader of the Party.

An election for the deputy leadership of the party was held, as under Liberal Party rules, all leadership positions are declared vacant after a general election, no matter what the outcome.

== Background ==
Despite winning a slim majority (50.10 percent) of the two-party vote in the 1990 election, the Coalition came seven seats short of government. Andrew Peacock stood down as leader less than a year since he replaced John Howard, and supported his Shadow Treasurer John Hewson to replace him.

== Candidates ==
- John Hewson, Shadow Treasurer, Member for Wentworth
- Peter Reith, Shadow Minister for Education, Member for Flinders
- Alasdair Webster, Member for Macquarie

== Potential candidates who declined to run ==
- John Howard, Shadow Minister for Industry, Technology and Commerce, Member for Bennelong

== Results ==
Liberal Party of Australia deputy leadership ballot, 1990
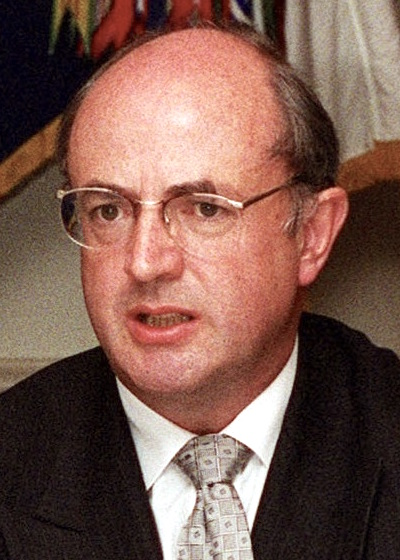

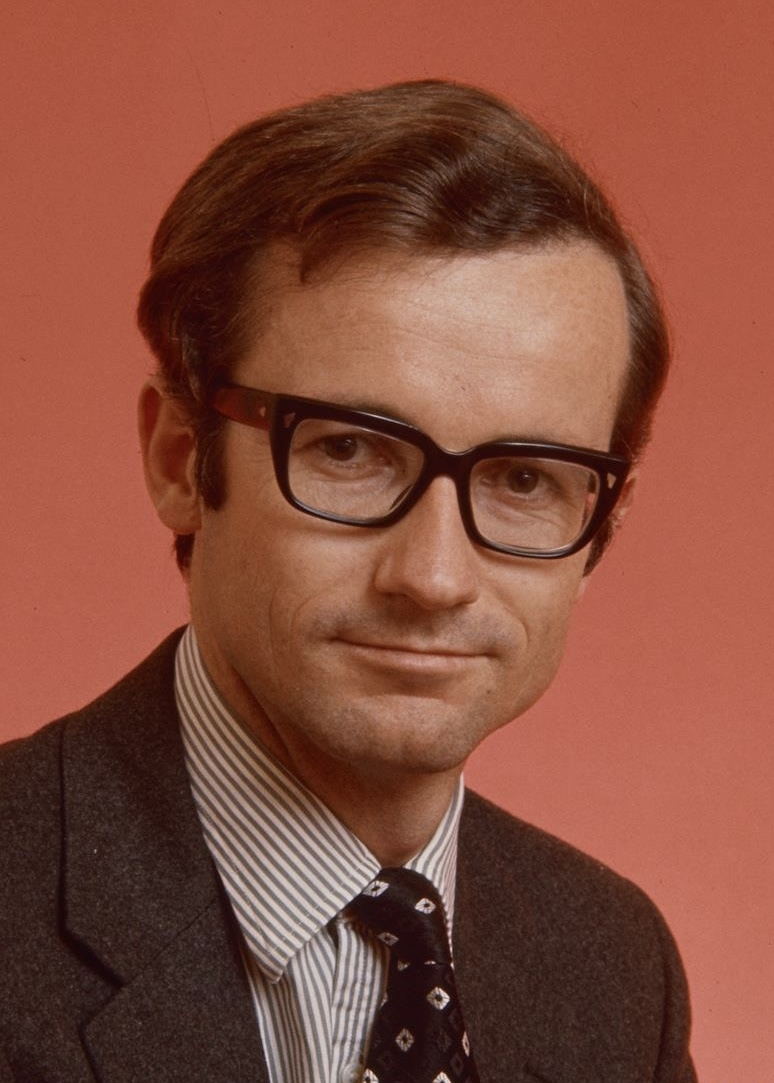
| Candidate | Peter Reith | David Jull | Fred Chaney |
| Final ballot | 44 (55.7%) | 34 (44.3%) | Eliminated |
| Seat | Flinders (Vic.) | Fadden (Qld.) | Pearce (WA) |
Deputy Leader before election
Fred Chaney
Elected Deputy Leader
Peter Reith

The following tables gives the ballot results:

=== Leadership ballot ===
| Name | Votes | Percentage |
|---|---|---|
| John Hewson | 62 | 75.5 |
| Peter Reith | 13 | 16.2 |
| Alasdair Webster | 5 | 8.3 |

=== Deputy leadership ballot ===
| Name | Final ballot | Percentage |
|---|---|---|
| Peter Reith | 44 | 55.7 |
| David Jull | 35 | 44.3 |
| Fred Chaney | Eliminated | |

Other candidates:

- Peter Shack
- Julian Beale
- Ken Aldred
- Kathy Sullivan
- Bill Taylor

== Aftermath ==
After his election as leader, Hewson endorsed former leader Peacock as his deputy, which caused a furore with Howard supporters, however, Peacock had no interest in becoming deputy leader again and withdrew happily. Peter Reith was instead elected deputy in a close contest against Peacock supporter David Jull.
