= Kathryn Welch =

Australian classical scholar

- Title: Honorary Associate Professor

Academic background
- Education: University of Sydney (BA & MA); University of Queensland (PhD)
- Thesis: Caesar and Rome : a study of Roman politics and administration, 49-44 B.C. (1990)

Academic work
- Discipline: Classics
- Sub-discipline: Roman History
- Institutions: University of Sydney

Kathryn Welch is an Australian historian. She is an honorary associate professor in the Department of Classics and Ancient History at the University of Sydney, and a specialist in Roman Republican and early Imperial History.

== Career ==
Kathryn Welch studied for her BA and MA at the University of Sydney, before moving to the University of Queensland for her PhD. Her PhD thesis, titled "Caesar and Rome: a study of Roman politics and administration, 49-44 B.C." was completed in 1990. She worked for six years as a teacher at Kogarah High School. In 1991, she joined the University of Sydney. She has been awarded various research fellowships: including between 1993 and 1996 a Leverhulme Trust postdoctoral research fellowship at the University of Exeter, and in 1999 a Research Institute of Humanities and Social Sciences Writing Fellowship. She has also held visiting research fellowships. In 2003, she was a senior visiting fellow at the Australian Centre for Numismatic Studies, Macquarie University, in 2016 a visiting scholar at Merton College, and in 2017 at the University of Heidelberg. She also held the Thompson Fellowship at the University of Sydney in 2017. Between 2013 and 2017, she served as honorary secretary of the Australasian Society for Classical Studies. She retired from her university post in 2021, and remains a co-director of the Pompeii Cast Project, a project which focuses on analysis of plaster casts from Pompeii.

== Research ==
Welch's research focuses on the politics and historiography of the late Roman Republic and early empire. Her 2012 book on Sextus Pompeius has been described as an "important contribution" and a "welcome reassessment" of the late Republican period, and her chapter in the volume The alternative Augustan age was described as a "prosopographical gem". Her work on Appian has similarly been described as "important" for adjusting modern assessments of the ancient historian.

== Selected publications ==
- Welch, K., Powel, A. (2002). Sextus Pompeius. United Kingdom: Gerald Duckworth & Co and The Classical Press of Wales.
- Welch, K., Hillard, T. (2005). Roman Crossings: Theory and Practice in the Roman Republic. Swansea: The Classical Press of Wales.
- Welch, K. (2012). Magnus Pius: Sextus Pompeius and the Transformation of the Roman Republic. Swansea, UK: The Classical Press of Wales.
- Welch, K. (2015). Appian's Roman History: Empire and Civil War. Swansea: The Classical Press of Wales.
- Welch, K. (2019). Shields of Virtue(s). In K. Morrell, J. Osgood, K. Welch (Eds.), The Alternative Augustan Age, (pp. 282–304). New York: Oxford University Press.
