= Kogarah High School =

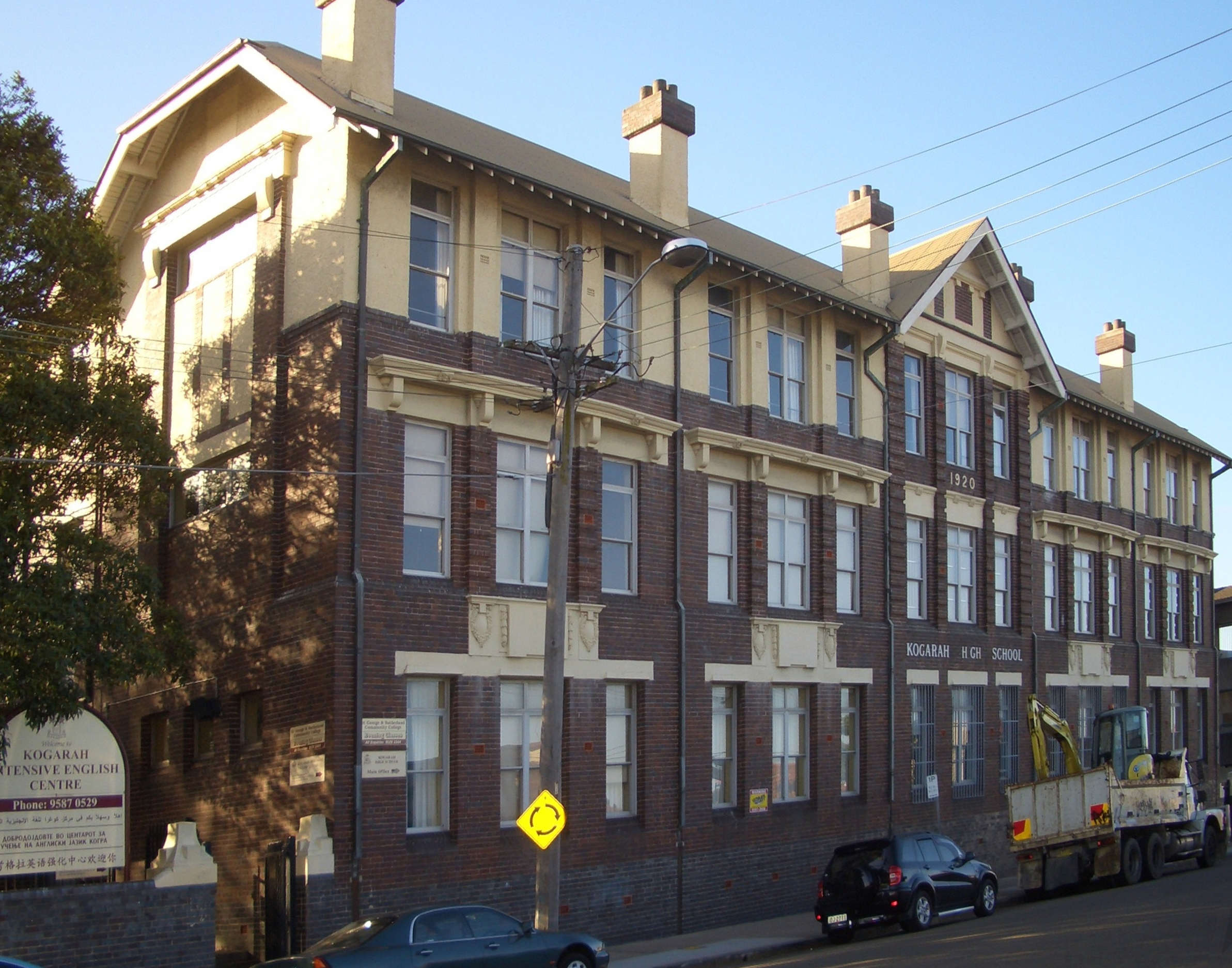
- Kogarah High School, Regent Street

Location
- 22A Gladstone Street; Kogarah, New South Wales, 2217; Australia; 33°57′39.87″S 151°8′3.96″E

Information
- Type: Public comprehensive
- Motto: Latin: Honor Super Omnia (Honour Above All)
- Established: 1891
- Principal: Darrel Hamilton
- Teaching staff: 77
- Employees: 102
- Grades: 7–12
- Gender: Co-educational-boys and girls
- Enrolment: ~809 (2024)
- Website: kogarah-h.schools.nsw.gov.au

Kogarah High School is a comprehensive co-educational school located in Kogarah, New South Wales, Australia.

== Sport houses ==
Kogarah High School has a long history of student achievement both academically, and on the sporting field. The school's sport houses are named after four sporting greats who are former students; Rosewall, Crampton, O'Neill and Chapman.

== History ==
1891: A New Building

In 1876 a new public school was built as well as a teachers’ residence on a site behind the present high school in Regent Street. The expansion of the railway line to Kogarah and beyond, early in the 1880s was a great influence on Kogarah High School as it enabled easy travel for students from neighbouring suburbs and enrolments subsequently increased.

1891 saw the construction of the older half of the present senior school. Here is an architect's description of the building contained in Department of Education records:

"The building is of Jacobean type, built of buff bricks, with dark brick and stone dressings and roofed with red Marseilles tiles."

During this era, the school functioned as an infants and primary school, but by 1892, it has been redesigned as a "Superior School", meaning that some of its students were doing secondary work. The school continued to expand in the first decade of the 20th century, reaching an enrolment of 1,500 in 1909. Around this time, the school functioned as 3 separate departments. There was an infants and primary section, a Girls Intermediate High School section from 1913 and a Boys Intermediate High School section formed in 1920. Part of the girls' section broke away to form St George Girls High School in 1916 but girls continued to be taught by a section that became known as the Kogarah Central Domestic Science School.

The infants' section moved away to the site of the present Kogarah Public School in 1954, and the primary section soon joined them. In 1959 the Home Science School became a full High School and the Boys' school received this status in 1959. This meant that they both were teaching students up to the level of the Leaving Certificate. In 1963, both schools combined to form Kogarah High School as the co-educational school it is today.

== Notable alumni ==
- Gary Chapman – Olympic and Commonwealth Games swimming medallist
- Bill Crabtree – MLA for Kogarah for 31 years
- Bruce Crampton – golfer
- John Hewson – former leader of the federal opposition (Liberal Party)
- Norman O'Neill – Australian and Sheffield Shield cricketer
- Ken Rosewall – Tennis player who won seven grand slams
- June Salter – actress
- Barrie Unsworth – Australian politician, 36th Premier of New South Wales

== Notable staff ==
- Kathryn Welch

== See also ==
- List of Government schools in New South Wales
