= 1995 Wentworth by-election =

- 8 April 1995

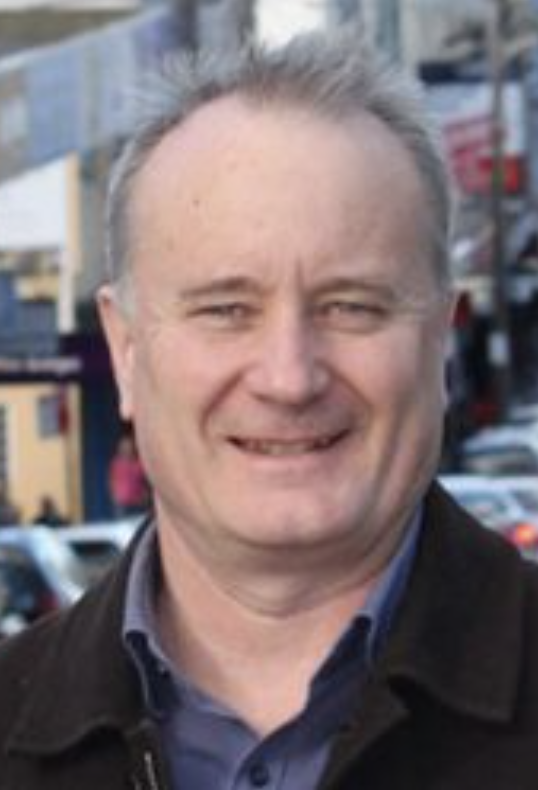

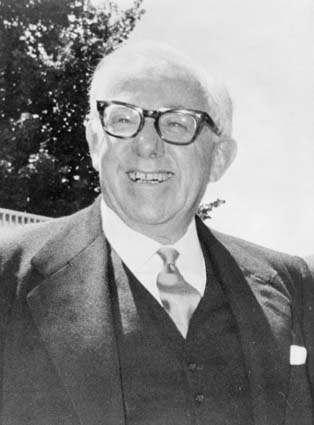
	First party	Second party	Third party
Candidate	Andrew Thomson	Murray Matson	Bill Wentworth
Party	Liberal	Greens	Independent
Popular vote	30,677	15,120	10,945
Percentage	52.84%	26.04%	18.85%
Swing	▲0.17	▲26.04	▲18.85
TPP	65.90%	34.10%
TPP swing	▲10.36	▲34.10
MP before election
John Hewson
Liberal
Elected MP
Andrew Thomson
Liberal

The 1995 Wentworth by-election was held in the Australian electorate of Wentworth in New South Wales on 8 April 1995. The by-election was triggered by the resignation of the sitting member, former Liberal Party of Australia leader Dr John Hewson on 28 February 1995. The writ for the by-election was issued on 3 March 1995.

== Background ==
John Hewson was elected as the member for Wentworth in 1987, in 1988 Opposition leader John Howard appointed him Shadow Finance Minister, in May 1989 Hewson became Shadow Treasurer after Andrew Peacock replaced Howard, after Peacock lost in the 1990 election, Hewson became the Leader of the Opposition defeating Peter Reith , the Coalition lost the 1993 federal election. Hewson had pledged to resign if the Coalition lost the 1993 election, but did not do so, and despite retaining the leadership over John Howard and Bruce Reid his leadership was undermined over the next year by Alexander Downer, Peter Costello and Bronwyn Bishop.

Eventually, Hewson called a leadership ballot in May 1994 which was won by Downer with Costello as his deputy. For three months, Hewson was part of the Downer shadow ministry until he was sacked by Downer in August 1994. Downer's leadership lasted until January 1995, when he resigned and John Howard won the leadership, prior to his resignation Downer asked for Hewsons support against a Howard leadership challenge but Hewson declared he wanted the Shadow Treasurer portfolio held by Peter Costello the deputy leader of the Opposition. In February 1995, Hewson resigned from Parliament after prior speculation he was to be subject to pre selection challenge.

== Results ==
Wentworth by-election, 1995
Party	Candidate	Votes	%	±%
Liberal	Andrew Thomson	30,677	52.84	+0.17
Greens	Murray Matson	15,120	26.04	+26.04
Independent	Bill Wentworth	10,945	18.85	+18.85
	John Hooper	1,317	2.27	+2.27
Total formal votes		58,059	96.04	−1.06
Informal votes		2,392	3.96	+1.06
Turnout		60,451	76.64	−17.91
Two-candidate-preferred result
Liberal	Andrew Thomson	38,261	65.90	+10.36
Greens	Murray Matson	19,798	34.10	+34.10
Liberal hold		Swing	N/A	

== Aftermath ==
The Australian Labor Party did not run a candidate in the by-election, and the two-candidate preferred votes went to the Australian Greens candidate who polled 34.1 per cent. The former Liberal minister Bill Wentworth (great grandson of the seat's namesake, William Wentworth) stood as an independent, and gained a primary vote of 18.9 per cent. The Liberal Party retained the seat, however, with Andrew Thomson elected to parliament.

== See also ==
- List of Australian federal by-elections
