= John Hewson =

Former Australian politician

John Hewson AM
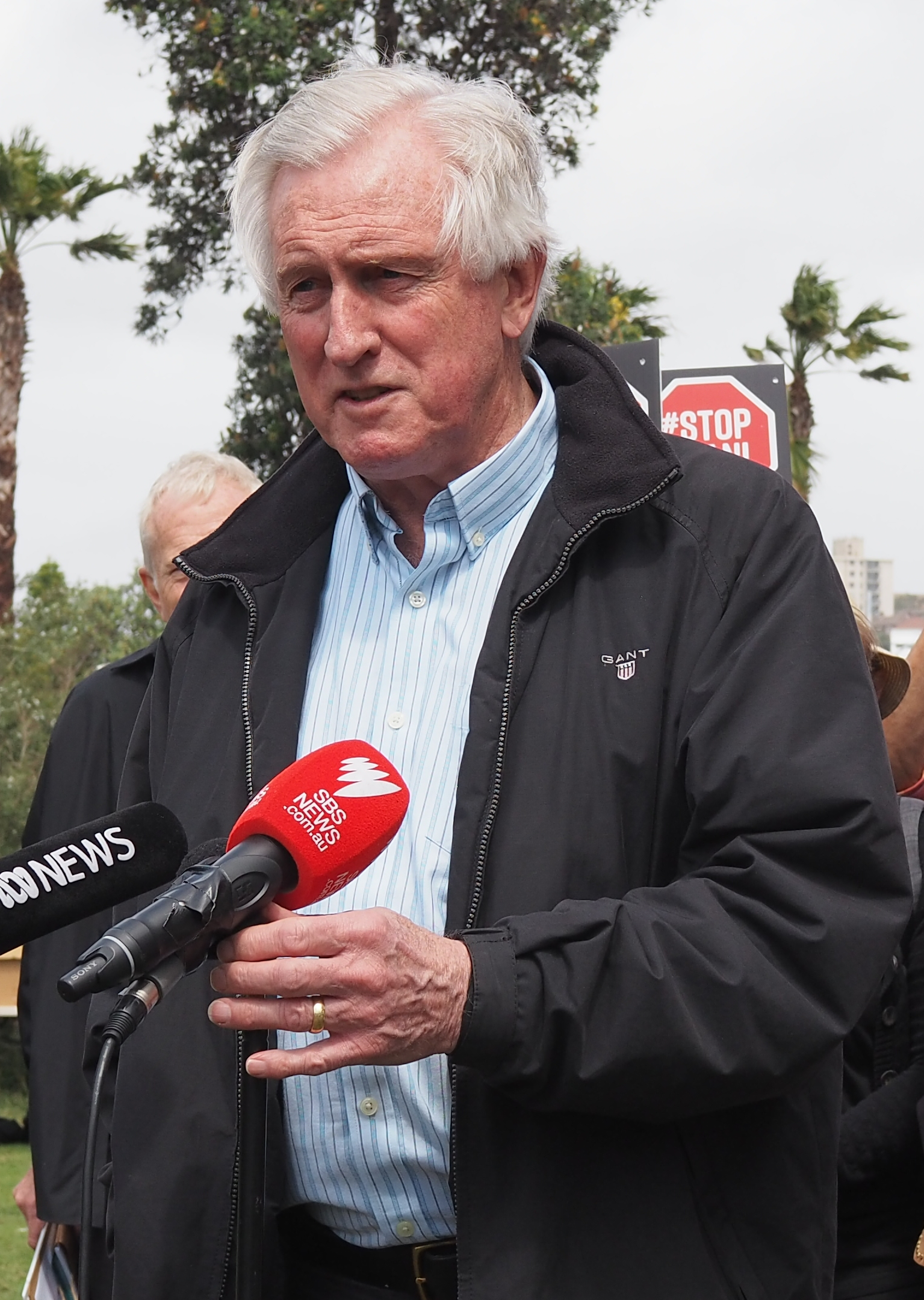
- Hewson in 2018

Leader of the Opposition
- In office 3 April 1990 – 23 May 1994
- Prime Minister: Bob Hawke; Paul Keating
- Deputy: Peter Reith; Michael Wooldridge
- Preceded by: Andrew Peacock
- Succeeded by: Alexander Downer

Leader of the Liberal Party
- In office 3 April 1990 – 23 May 1994
- Deputy: Peter Reith; Michael Wooldridge
- Preceded by: Andrew Peacock
- Succeeded by: Alexander Downer

Member of the Australian Parliament for Wentworth
- In office 11 July 1987 – 28 February 1995
- Preceded by: Peter Coleman
- Succeeded by: Andrew Thomson

Personal details
- Born: John Robert Hewson; 28 October 1946 (age 80) Carlton, New South Wales, Australia
- Party: Liberal (until 2019)
- Spouses: Margaret Deaves (m. 1967; div. 1985) Carolyn Somerville (m. 1988; div. 2004) Jessica Wilson (m. 2007)
- Children: 5
- Education: Kogarah High School; University of Sydney; University of Regina; Johns Hopkins University
- Occupation: Economist (Reserve Bank of Australia); Bank director (Macquarie Bank)
- Profession: Financier businessman politician

John Robert Hewson (born 28 October 1946) is an Australian former politician who served as leader of the Liberal Party from 1990 to 1994. He led the Liberal-National Coalition to defeat at the 1993 Australian federal election.

Hewson was born in Sydney, New South Wales, and earned a PhD in Economics from Johns Hopkins University. He has also attained degrees from the University of Sydney and the University of Regina. Before entering politics, Hewson worked as an economist for the Reserve Bank of Australia, an economic advisor to the Fraser government, a business journalist, and a director of Macquarie Bank.

In 1987, Hewson was elected to the House of Representatives. He was appointed to the shadow cabinet in 1988, serving under John Howard and Andrew Peacock. After Peacock lost the 1990 election, Hewson was elected leader of the Liberal Party in his place, thus becoming Leader of the Opposition. In 1991, he launched the Fightback! policy manifesto, which proposed a series of major economic reforms with a goods and services tax (GST) as its centrepiece.

Political platforms in the 1993 federal election focused mainly on economic policy, especially on how Australia should respond to the early 1990s recession. The Labor Party – led by Paul Keating – had been in power for 10 years at that point. Many polls suggested a Coalition victory, however Labor was able to mount a successful campaign, with the party's net increase in seats allowing Keating to remain Prime Minister. Hewson continued on as Liberal leader for another year, losing a leadership spill to Alexander Downer in 1994. He left parliament the following year. Since then, Hewson has continued to be a public expert in business and political commentary. He resigned his Liberal Party membership in 2019, having been a critic of its policy direction for a number of years, particularly on climate change.

== Early life ==
Hewson was born at Baroda Private Hospital in Carlton, Sydney, New South Wales. He was the first of four children born to Eileen Isabella (née Tippett) and Donald Hewson. His mother was born in England and arrived in Australia at the age of six. His father worked as a fitter and turner. Hewson spent his early years in Carlton, where his parents lived with his paternal grandmother and his father's three sisters. His father eventually saved enough money to buy a house in Beverly Hills. Hewson attended Carlton Primary School and Beverly Hills North Primary School before attending Kogarah High School, graduating in 1963. He subsequently completed a Bachelor of Economics degree at the University of Sydney in 1967. He then completed a master's degree at the Regina, Canada campus of the University of Saskatchewan (which since 1974 has been the University of Regina) and a second master's and a doctorate in economics at Johns Hopkins University in Baltimore. In 1967, he married Margaret Deaves.

Upon returning to Australia, Hewson worked as an economist for the Reserve Bank of Australia. From 1976 to 1983 he was employed as an economic advisor to two successive Liberal treasurers, Phillip Lynch and John Howard. During this period he developed an interest in politics and became determined to enter politics himself. While he espoused strong liberal views, he was critical of what he saw as unconvincing and inconsistent Liberal Party economic policies. He was a supporter of some of the economic policies of Margaret Thatcher.

After the defeat of the Fraser government in the 1983 election, Hewson went into business journalism and became a director of a private bank, the Macquarie Bank. After divorcing Margaret Deaves in 1985, Hewson would go on to marry Carolyn Somerville in 1988. Deaves claims that Hewson left her because he was under the impression she would not be able to cope with the responsibilities of public life as the wife of a prominent public servant despite her working to support him while he was studying overseas.

== Politics ==
Hewson was elected to the House of Representatives for the affluent Sydney electorate of Wentworth in the 1987 federal election. Before the election he was told he would have to give up his Ferrari to be pre-selected. However, Hewson kept his car despite it attracting controversy. He entered Parliament at a time when there was a leadership vacuum among the conservatives. The Coalition, led by John Howard, lost the 1987 election, but a majority of Liberal MPs voted to keep him as leader over his predecessor Andrew Peacock.

Hewson was Howard's advisor when Howard was Treasurer and the two formed a friendship. However their friendship hit a low point when Hewson won Liberal preselection for Wentworth. After Hewson's preselection, Howard was seen talking to Dr. Jane Munro, who like Hewson was also an academic and was Hewson's main rival for the preselection. Hewson then angrily accused Howard of supporting Munro for the preselection instead of Hewson. Government and Opposition MPs who are new to Parliament usually take their place on the backbench but Hewson believed he was an exception to this due to his personal history with Howard. Hewson was therefore disappointed not to be offered a shadow portfolio by Howard.

Hewson instead sat on the backbench until September 1988 when Howard appointed Hewson as shadow finance minister. In May 1989, when Andrew Peacock replaced Howard as Leader after a challenge in which Hewson voted for Howard, Hewson became shadow treasurer. Even prior to Howard's removal, when Peacock was the shadow treasurer, Hewson had been seen as the real shadow treasurer. In the lead-up to the 1990 election, Hewson, the trained economist, was seen to have performed well against the then-treasurer Paul Keating. In December 1989, Hewson claimed that Keating was reluctant to debate with him on the economy.

=== Election to Leadership of the Opposition ===
When the Coalition were defeated at the 1990 federal elections, Peacock quit and supported Hewson, who was elected to the Liberal leadership despite having been in Parliament for only three years, as Hewson had been one of the top Liberal players in the 1990 election campaign. In the contest for leadership, Hewson defeated Peter Reith 62 votes to 13. Reith was then elected deputy leader over David Jull, with Hewson making Reith Shadow Treasurer. One of the reasons for Hewson's election to the leadership was that Peacock wanted to prevent Howard from regaining leadership. Another reason for Hewson's election was a desire by the Liberal party to have generational change, according to John Howard, who believed Hewson was not ready to be leader. Previously, Hewson had endorsed Peacock as his deputy, which created much resentment for him among Howard's supporters. Peacock, however, had no interest in becoming deputy leader again and withdrew his candidacy. In 1991, Hewson's ex-wife Margaret declared on 60 minutes that she would vote for him at the next election, as did his son Tim, who claimed Hewson had placed politics before his family and that was why his father had divorced Margaret. Margaret claimed the first six months of her divorce was the hardest and she had not realised someone else was on the scene. Hewson's shadow ministry included newly elected Member for Higgins Peter Costello; Hewson had told Costello he would not be a Minister in a Hewson government, a joke Costello would relay years later. In 1991, Hewson spoke at the Australian Council of Social Services, where he stated that the organisation was reinforcing the biblical reminder that "the Poor are with us forever" by making welfare provisions larger and otherwise want to acquire more money for welfare and making bureaucracies larger. This caused controversy for Hewson, who came to be seen as harsh and untrustworthy in the mind of Australian reporter Laurie Oakes.

=== Fightback! and the 1993 federal election ===
George H. W. Bush and Hewson in Parliament House in 1991

Shortly after gaining the leadership, Hewson made up ground on the Hawke government in the opinion polls as the Australian economy struggled with the early 1990s recession. Hewson was determined to make a break with what he saw as the "weak pragmatism of past Liberal leaders." In November 1991, the opposition launched the 650-page Fightback! policy document − a radical collection of economic liberal measures including the introduction of a Goods and Services Tax (GST), various changes to Medicare including the abolition of bulk billing for non-concession holders, the introduction of a nine-month limit on unemployment benefits, various changes to industrial relations laws including the abolition of awards, a $13 billion personal income tax cut directed at middle and upper income earners, $10 billion in government spending cuts, the abolition of state payroll taxes, and the privatisation of a large number of government owned enterprises − representing the start of a very different direction from the keynesian economic conservatism practiced by previous Liberal/National Coalition governments. The 15 percent GST was the centrepiece of the policy document.

In December 1991, Keating successfully defeated Hawke and became prime minister. In 1992, Keating mounted a campaign against the Fightback package and particularly against the GST, which he described as an attack on the working class, as it shifted the tax burden from direct taxation of the wealthy to indirect taxation as a broad-based consumption tax. Keating memorably described the impact of Hewson's GST as "15% on this, 15% on that", and Hewson as a "feral abacus."

In 1992, Hewson attacked New South Wales Labor leader Bob Carr for his lack of a family life when compared to Liberal Premier John Fahey, stating, "You've got to be suspicious of a guy that doesn't drive, doesn't like kids and things like that. When he's up against a full-blooded Australian like John Fahey, he hasn't got a hope". Keating responded by saying "I don't think Ben Chifley had any trouble being a full-blooded Australian and he didn't have any children", and Hewson was later forced to withdraw the remark. Carr and his wife Helena did not respond to Hewson's attack.

Keating won the 1993 election, marking a record fifth consecutive Labor term, with the Coalition losing what many had described as "the unlosable election" for them. The issue of the GST was dropped from the Liberal Party's agenda until the 1998 election campaign. Apart from the GST, other factors were believed to have contributed to the 1993 election defeat, including the fear of changes to Medicare and the zero Tariff policy. Peter Costello stated that he believes Hewson's Fightback! campaign caused unnecessary confrontations and that Hewson lacked the experience to know which policies to fight for and which ones to leave alone. Notable confrontations including the GST proposal receiving opposition from Churches and Welfare as well as opposition to abolishing bulk billing and changing superannuation. An additional reason for the defeat was the partial backdown Hewson made in Fightback! policy in 1992 by agreeing not to levy the GST on food. This concession caused Hewson to be exposed to assertions of weakness and inconsistency, and also complicated the financial arithmetic of the whole package, as the weakening of the GST reduced the scope for tax cuts, the most attractive element of the package for middle-class voters. The complications of the revised Fightback! package were demonstrated in the "birthday cake interview", in which Hewson was unable to answer a question posed by journalist Mike Willesee about whether or not a birthday cake would cost more or less under a Coalition government. Hewson was instead forced into a series of circumlocutions about whether the cake would be decorated, have ice cream in it and so on, considered by some as a turning point in the election campaign. In reference to the birthday cake interview in an August 2006 interview, Hewson said: "Well I answered the question honestly. The answer's actually right. That doesn't count...I should have told him (Mike Willesee) to get stuffed!". According to Channel 9's 20 to 1 episode Unscripted and Unplanned, the Birthday Cake Interview incident was the moment Hewson lost the election with the interview held 10 days before polling day, even though polls supported a Coalition victory right up to election day.

=== Loss of leadership & retirement ===
Hewson announced that if the Coalition lost the 1993 election, he would resign as Liberal Leader. However, he changed his mind after the election and decided to not resign as Leader due to his objection to John Howard as his replacement, and the uncertainty this would create for issues like the Native Act and the Republic issue. Hewson felt he had to remain Leader, believing that Howard failed his Liberal leadership tenure from 1985 to 1989 and would not be a good leader of the party. Hewson also rejected suggestions like the one made by Senator Michael Baume that he was being used by Andrew Peacock and his supporters to block Howard from returning. Hewson defeated Howard in a post-election party leadership challenge in March 1993, which included the nomination of Bruce Reid, Member for Bendigo.

However, Hewson was not guaranteed to still be Coalition Leader by the time of the next Federal election in early 1996. Liberal MP's such as Peter Costello and Bronwyn Bishop consistently undermined his leadership over the subsequent year; the media coverage of Bishop's transfer from the Senate to the House of Representatives in 1994 damaged Hewson in a similar fashion to how the Joh for Canberra campaign damaged John Howard in the 1980s. Through persistent questions over his leadership, Hewson's consistent response was that "leadership is not an issue". Highly regarded Australian psephologist Antony Green believes that had the former deputy Liberal leader Fred Chaney not retired in 1993 he could have succeeded Hewson as Liberal leader in 1993. Chaney was described by Hewson as "the little ***** from the West".

As well as staying as Leader after the 1993 election defeat, Hewson also appointed himself Shadow Minister for Arts and Heritage, a position he held until the end of his leadership in May 1994. During this time he shadowed Arts Ministers Bob McMullan and Michael Lee.

In 1993, during Parliamentary question time, Hewson declared to Paul Keating that the passing of the Mabo act would be "a day of shame" for Australia, stating that an alternative solution should be sought for the Aborigines. Hewson claimed his inflammatory remarks were directed at Keating's policy and not extinguishing pastoral leases, but he never explained what better solution he was seeking and never withdrew his offensive remarks. In 1994, Hewson declared Fightback! to be dead. Around the same time, he declared his support for the Mardi Gras. Although the Labor Treasurer John Dawkins had presented a badly received 1993/1994 budget, Hewson seemed to not be making any momentum against the Federal Labor government as he had done in his previous parliamentary term. Hewson gave a speech arguing that hardline Monarchists were an anachronism, which resulted in John Howard storming into his office and shouting that Australia would be a republic over his dead body.

In early 1994, Labor Minister Ros Kelly became involved in a scandal known as the 'sports rorts' affair, which eventually led to her resignation. Kelly had previously stated that Hewson would be the only one resigning. In May 1994, Hewson asserted that he was leader of the Liberal party, and was surprised by negative internal party polling on an episode of Lateline, which led to his falling out with Liberal Federal Director Andrew Robb. Hewson attempted to silence leadership speculation in general by calling a leadership ballot on 23 May 1994. However, he lost the vote and the leadership to Alexander Downer, who had undermined Hewson while acting as Shadow Treasurer. Hewson had also lost the support of Federal Liberal Party President Tony Staley and Andrew Peacock, who had supported Hewson four years earlier and against Howard's 1993 leadership challenge. Staley broke it off with Hewson after being informed by fellow Liberal party member Ron Walker of difficulties in fundraising following the 1993 election defeat. Staley believed Hewson to be unelectable. Journalist Laurie Oakes claimed that Hewson viewed Peter Costello as his would-be challenger, unaware of the threat posed by Downer. Several days later after blaming Andrew Robb for his losing the leadership to Downer, Hewson was appointed as Shadow Minister for Industry, Commerce, Infrastructure, and Customs in Downer's shadow cabinet, becoming the third former Liberal leader in the group alongside Peacock (who quit politics later that year) and Howard.

Notwithstanding not foreseeing Downer as his replacement when he appointed him Shadow Treasurer, Hewson's strategy of saving his leadership was to promote rivals such as promoting Peter Costello to the Finance portfolio and bringing Bronwyn Bishop straight to Shadow Cabinet from the backbench with the new portfolio of Urban and Regional Strategy.

Despite his advocacy of right-wing economics, Hewson supported abortion, gay rights, and increasing working mothers' benefits. In August 1994, Hewson was dismissed by Downer from the shadow ministry after declaring his view on homosexual rights and for promoting himself as the conscience of the liberal party in Downer view. During January 1995, following a controversial joke about domestic violence policy several months prior, Downer, at the risk of a leadership challenge from John Howard, asked Hewson for his support against Howard. Hewson released a statement indicating that he would support either Downer or Howard for leadership, on the condition that he became Shadow Treasurer. This led to Peter Costello (The Shadow Treasurer) stating that Hewson's days had passed and describing him as a suicide bomber. Several days later, Downer resigned and Howard was elected Liberal leader for his second period. Hewson was not returned to the front bench as part of the Howard shadow cabinet and speculation spread that he intended to leave politics, a claim he denied while at the same time endorsing John Howard as Liberal party leader and prime minister. Former New South Wales Premier Nick Greiner confirmed he had advised Hewson to retire.

On 27 February 1995, Hewson announced in the House of Representatives that he would resign as Member for Wentworth, citing his second wife's pregnancy and the fact he was seen as interfering when he spoke up and as holding a seat he should vacate if he remained silent; his resignation from Parliament took effect the following day. He said in his resignation speech that, while the Coalition might have won in 1993 had he not released the Fightback! document, he would have had difficulty in passing legislation with the Senate, and he had therefore released it in an effort to secure support and gain a mandate for its goals. He also predicted that under Howard, the Coalition would win the next election as the electorate took its revenge on those who had pursued the politics of "fear and misrepresentation" in 1993. He is the only Liberal leader to leave politics without serving as a minister. Hewson was replaced by Andrew Thomson in the 1995 Wentworth by-election. Analysts had speculated that had Hewson remained in Parliament, he would have been at risk of losing Liberal party endorsement in a party pre-selection challenge to his seat potentially from Peter King. In other words, Hewson would have been forced to retire at subsequent federal election unless he stood as an independent if he quit the parliamentary liberal party. Hewson's former chief of staff, Tony Abbott, who had just entered Parliament in the Warringah by-election, was among those who voted against Hewson in the May 1994 spill. In the immediate aftermath, Abbott told The 7.30 Report that Hewson should be remembered for his first three years as leader, when he united the party following divisions caused by the Peacock-Howard rivalry, and not for his last twelve months. Abbott also remarked that as Fightback! was central to a Hewson Prime Ministership, when the initiative was abandoned, Hewson had nothing to stand on as a leader. In fact unlike Peacock and Howard or Malcolm Turnbull who departed from the Liberal Party leadership before returning to it there was no chance of Hewson regaining the position of leader. Hewson is alleged to have not taken advice from experts as leader and also closing the door on the backbench liberal mps.

Hewson's career stands as one of the shortest of any political party leader in Australia. Former Liberal Federal director Andrew Robb believes Hewson and the Liberals were spooked into releasing the policies of Fightback! too early by the Hawke government and parts of the media. Despite the 1993 election being regarded as a rejection of Fightback!, several parts of it were later adopted into law during the final term of the Keating Labor government, and to a larger extent during the Howard Liberal government (including the GST), while unemployment benefits and bulk billing were re-targeted for a time by the Abbott Liberal government.

== Career after politics ==
Since his departure from politics, Hewson has written extensively for the business and general press and spent time on the lecture circuit. In his writings, he demonstrated an increasing focus on corporate social and environmental responsibility. In 2003 and 2004, he chaired a community advisory committee for RepuTex, a company that provides analysis and forecasting for the energy sector and issued an annual public listing of Australia's top 100 socially and environmentally conscious companies.

=== Business and academic activity ===
In 1995, in one of his few private enterprise successes, Hewson was invited to join IT&T Services as a non-executive director. IT&T was a specialist IT and telecommunications design and project management group that delivered major technology projects for both corporate and government clients such as Citigroup, the Department of Defence, News Limited, and Ernst & Young across the Asia Pacific region. IT&T Services was acquired by the public company Powerlan Ltd in 2000. Hewson then became a professor of management at Macquarie University, Sydney, and Dean of the Macquarie Graduate School of Management in 2002, but resigned within two years. While at Macquarie University, he also served as a consultant to ABN AMRO.

In 2005, Hewson was elected to the Touring Car Entrants Group of Australia (TEGA) board as an independent member. He left in June 2006 after a dispute with V8 Supercars Australia chairman Tony Cochrane. Hewson held the position of chairman of the board of directors for the Elderslie Group, a company whose primary interests were corporate finance and property investments. Hewson touted the company to investors at a time when Elderslie was in financial difficulties, eventually leaving the company facing liquidation and large losses. When he resigned, he said that he was unsatisfied with the direction in which the Group was heading. On 2 July 2008, global accounting firm PwC was appointed as receiver and administrator of the failed Elderslie Group. Since around 2005, Hewson has been a member of the Trilateral Commission, an alliance of top political and economic leaders from North America, Asia-Pacific, and Europe.

In December 2012, Hewson was appointed as a non-executive director of Larus Energy, an oil and gas company developing operations in Papua New Guinea.

=== Political commentary ===
After 1996 Hewson became increasingly critical of Prime Minister John Howard. In 2003 he opposed Howard's decision to take part in the Iraq War although in 2004 argued it would be electoral "suicide" for the Liberal Party to replace Howard with an alternative leader. In July 2006, Hewson gave an interview to ABC's Four Corners program in which he voiced concern at the growing influence of what he characterised as a "hardline right religious element" in the New South Wales branch of the Liberal Party. This was in breach of a Liberal Party rule about speaking to the media and reports at the time claimed he could face expulsion from the party.

Hewson has repeatedly appeared in television interviews and on political panels and has been a regular columnist for the Australian Financial Review since 2004.

In 2011 Hewson was among 140 Australian community leaders who pledged support for an Emissions trading scheme, despite the fact the Coalition and its leader Tony Abbott (Hewson's former Press Secretary) opposed the carbon tax. In July 2015, Hewson was critical of Prime Minister Tony Abbott's continuing support for Speaker Bronwyn Bishop during the travel expenses scandal, stating that the cost of that support would be "enormous".

=== Departure from the Liberal Party ===
In a 2019 interview on Sky News in which he was speaking alongside Greens MP Adam Bandt, Hewson said that he had let his membership of the Liberal Party lapse. He has criticised various Liberal Party members, including former Prime Ministers Tony Abbott and Scott Morrison for their poor record on climate action. Hewson publicly campaigned for a price on carbon, a policy introduced by the Gillard Labor government and opposed by the Liberal Party's then leader Tony Abbott, who went on to scrap it as prime minister.

=== Awards ===
On 26 January 2001, Hewson was honored as a Member of the Order of Australia.

== Personal life ==
Hewson married Margaret Deaves in 1967 and they divorced in 1985. In 1988 he married Carolyn Somerville who was described by the media as "a formidable figure in investment banking". They divorced in 2004.

In 2007, Hewson married publicist Jessica Wilson. As of 2010, they reside in the Southern Highlands of New South Wales.

Since leaving politics, Hewson has been involved in a range of non-profit organisations, including the Arthritis Foundation of Australia and KidsXpress, a charity providing expressive therapy for children.

Parliament of Australia
Preceded by Peter Coleman	Member for Wentworth; 1987–1995	Succeeded by Andrew Thomson
Political offices
Preceded by John Stone	Shadow Minister for Finance; 1988–1989	Succeeded by John Stone
Preceded by Andrew Peacock	Shadow Treasurer of Australia; 1989–1990	Succeeded by Peter Reith
Preceded by Wilson Tuckey	Deputy Manager of Opposition Business in the House; 1989–1990; With: Tim Fischer	Succeeded by John Sharp
Preceded by Andrew Peacock	Leader of the Opposition of Australia; 1990–1994	Succeeded by Alexander Downer
Preceded by Michael Baume	Shadow Minister for the Arts and Heritage; 1993–1994	Succeeded by Richard Alston as Shadow Minister for Communications and the Arts
Preceded by Ian McLachlan as Shadow Minister for Industry and Commerce	Shadow Minister for Industry, Commerce, Infrastructure and Customs; 1993–1994	Succeeded by John Moore as Shadow Minister for Industry, Commerce and Privatisation
Preceded by Ian McLachlan as Shadow Minister for Infrastructure and National Development	Shadow Minister for Industry, Commerce, Infrastructure and Customs; 1993–1994	Succeeded by Ian MacDonald as Shadow Minister for Infrastructure
Preceded by Geoff Prosser as Shadow Minister for Small Business, Housing and Customs	Shadow Minister for Industry, Commerce, Infrastructure and Customs; 1993–1994	Succeeded by Warwick Parer as Shadow Minister for Customs
Party political offices
Preceded by Andrew Peacock	Leader of the Liberal Party of Australia; 1990–1994	Succeeded by Alexander Downer
