= Carolyn Hewson =

Australian business executive

Carolyn Hewson AO
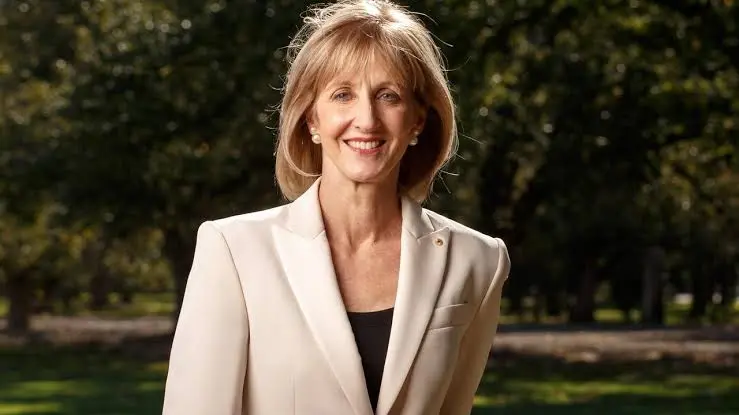
- Born: Carolyn Judith Somerville; 1955 (age 70–71)
- Education: University of Adelaide, Cambridge
- Occupation: Business leader
- Board member of: CSL Limited; Reserve Bank of Australia; Infrastructure SA
- Spouse: John Hewson (m. 1988; div. 2004)
- Children: 1 daughter

Carolyn Judith Hewson AO (née Somerville; born July 1955) is an Australian company director.

== Career ==
She studied at the University of Adelaide and at the University of Cambridge.

She is a former investment banker who has four decades of experience in the financial sector. Carolyn served as Executive Director for Schroders Australia Limited and possesses significant experience and expertise in financial markets, risk management, and investment management.

Carolyn was appointed by the Australian Government as a member of the 2014 Financial System Inquiry chaired by David Murray. In 2015 she was appointed to the Australian Government Industry Growth Centre advisory committee. In January 2019, Hewson was appointed as one of the members of the new board of Infrastructure SA, an organisation tasked by the Government of South Australia to develop a 20 year infrastructure strategy and five year plans.

Carolyn is a director and member of the Audit and Risk Committee of CSL, a globally successful biotech and one of Australia's largest companies. She held the position of Director of BHP, for 9 years before retiring in late 2019 and has also previously held board positions with Westpac, AMP, CSR, AGL Energy, Stockland Group and BT Investment Management.

In December 2020, Hewson was appointed as a member of the board of the Reserve Bank of Australia.

Carolyn has been deeply involved in the not-for-profit sector and is a passionate Adelaide Crows supporter. She was made an Officer of the Order of Australia (AO) in the 2009 Queen's Birthday Honours "for service to the community through support for charitable organisations, and to business," has been recognised as "one of Australia’s most influential company directors," and ranked as "Australia’s most influential female board directors" by The Australian Financial Review. In 2024 Carloyn was named as one of the 10 most influential people in South Australia.

Carolyn has one daughter and lives in South Australia.
