= Andrew Thomson (Australian politician) =

Australian politician

The Honourable Andrew Thomson

Minister for Sport and Tourism
- In office 6 October 1997 – 21 October 1998
- Preceded by: Warwick Smith (Sport); Michael Lee (Tourism)
- Succeeded by: Jackie Kelly

Member of the Australian Parliament for Wentworth
- In office 8 April 1995 – 8 October 2001
- Preceded by: John Hewson
- Succeeded by: Peter King

Personal details
- Born: 7 January 1961 (age 65) Melbourne, Victoria, Australia
- Party: Liberal
- Relations: Peter Thomson (father)
- Education: University of Melbourne; Keio University; Georgetown University Law Center
- Profession: Solicitor

Andrew Peter Thomson (born 7 January 1961) is an Australian former politician who served as Minister for Sport and Tourism in the Howard government. He was the member for Wentworth in the House of Representatives from 1995 until 2001.

== Biography ==
Thomson is the son of the Australian golfer Peter Thomson and worked as a solicitor, investment banker and golf course designer before entering politics. He was educated at the University of Melbourne (arts/law), Keio University in Tokyo and later at Georgetown University Law Center in Washington DC. He entered parliament in April 1995 in a Wentworth by-election after Dr John Hewson vacated the seat when he retired from politics after being dumped from the Downer Shadow Cabinet and not reinstated into Howard's.

When the Coalition took government at the 1996 election, Thomson was made Parliamentary Secretary to the Minister for Foreign Affairs. On 6 October 1997, he became Minister for Sport and Tourism, and Minister Assisting the Prime Minister for the Sydney 2000 Games. Thomson was the first Member of the House of Representatives to speak fluent Japanese and Chinese.

Thomson retired from the seat of Wentworth in 2001 after losing preselection to Peter King. Thereafter, he worked in the United States after passing the New York Bar Exam, then later joined Minter Ellison in Australia as a special counsel. He worked in Singapore, Abu Dhabi, Saudi Arabia and Beijing before returning to live in Tokyo in early 2011 where he had worked in his twenties. Currently, he is registered as a foreign lawyer in Japan and has his own practice in the city of Fukuoka.

Political offices
Preceded by Warwick Smith as Minister for Sport	Minister for Sport and Tourism; 1997–1998	Succeeded by Jackie Kelly
Preceded by Michael Lee as Minister for Tourism	Minister for Sport and Tourism; 1997–1998	Succeeded by Jackie Kelly
Preceded by Warwick Smith	Minister Assisting the Prime Minister for the Sydney 2000 Olympic Games; 1997–1998	Succeeded by Jackie Kelly
Parliament of Australia
Preceded by John Hewson	Member for Wentworth; 1995–2001	Succeeded by Peter King
