= 1981 Wentworth by-election =

A by-election was held for the Australian House of Representatives seat of Wentworth on 11 April 1981. This was triggered by the resignation of Liberal MP Robert Ellicott.

Future Prime Minister of Australia Malcolm Turnbull was unsuccessful for Liberal preselection, with the by-election won by the preselected Liberal candidate Peter Coleman.

== Results ==
Wentworth by-election, 1981
Party	Candidate	Votes	%	±%
Liberal	Peter Coleman	22,736	48.1	−12.4
Labor	Robert Tickner	16,637	35.2	+1.9
Independent Liberal	Katherine Wentworth	4,923	10.4	+10.4
Democrats	Joan Kersey	2,186	4.6	−1.6
Independent	Alfred Bussell	534	1.1	+1.1
Independent	William More	176	0.4	+0.4
Independent	Walker Roach	92	0.2	+0.2
Total formal votes		47,284	97.2	−0.3
Informal votes		1,349	2.8	+0.3
Turnout		48,633	69.5	−19.0
Liberal hold		Swing	−3.4	

=== Distribution of preferences ===
Peter Coleman attained a quota (an absolute majority of formal votes) when two other candidates were left in the count, meaning that no two-party-preferred figure was attained.

Result after distribution of preferences
Party	Candidate	Votes	%	±%
Liberal	Peter Coleman	23,928	50.6	
Labor	Robert Tickner	18,009	38.1	
Independent Liberal	Katherine Wentworth	5,347	11.3	

== See also ==
- List of Australian federal by-elections
