= Electorates in Australia =

Electorates in Australia are geographically defined areas represented by a single elected Member of Parliament. Known officially as divisions at the federal level and electoral districts at the state and territory level, "electorates" are also commonly referred to as seats or constituencies. Electorates are designed so that there is approximately the same number of voters in each electorate.

== See also ==
- Divisions of the Australian House of Representatives
- Electoral divisions of the Northern Territory
- Electoral districts of Western Australia
- Australian electoral system
- Parliaments of the Australian states and territories
- Electorates of the Australian states and territories
