= Division of Wentworth =

Australian federal electoral division

Coordinates: 33.883°S 151.253°E

Wentworth Australian House of Representatives Division
- Interactive map of electorate boundaries from the 2025 federal election
- Created: 1901
- MP: Allegra Spender
- Party: Community Strong
- Namesake: William Charles Wentworth
- Electors: 127,511 (2025)
- Area: 31 km^{2} (12.0 sq mi)
- Demographic: Inner metropolitan
Electorates around Wentworth:
Warringah	Warringah	Tasman Sea
Sydney	Wentworth	Tasman Sea
Kingsford Smith	Kingsford Smith	Tasman Sea

The Division of Wentworth is an Australian electoral division in the state of New South Wales. The division encompasses the suburbs which lie east of Sydney CBD, primarily consisting of the Woollahra and Waverley councils in Sydney's Eastern Suburbs.

Since 2022 its MP has been Allegra Spender, representing Community Strong. From 2004 to 2018, the seat was held by Malcolm Turnbull, who served as Prime Minister of Australia from 2015 to 2018.

== History ==
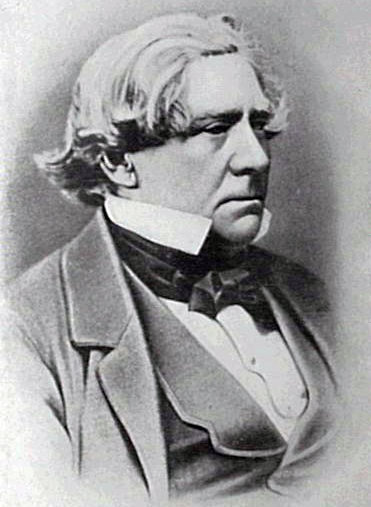
William Charles Wentworth, the division's namesake

The division was proclaimed in 1900 and was one of the original 65 divisions contested at the first federal election. The division is named after William Charles Wentworth (1790–1872), an Australian explorer and statesman. In 1813 he accompanied Blaxland and Lawson on their crossing of the Blue Mountains. Wentworth was also an advocate of free and representative government in Australia.

Historically considered a safe seat for the Liberal Party of Australia and its predecessors, Wentworth is the only original federation division in New South Wales which has never been held by the Australian Labor Party, though Labor candidate Jessie Street came within 1.6 percent of winning Wentworth at the 1943 election landslide. The electorate is the nation's wealthiest, contains the nation's largest Jewish population and contains the nation's fifth-largest number of same-sex couples.

Its most prominent member was Malcolm Turnbull, who served as Leader of the Opposition from 2008 to 2009 and as Prime Minister of Australia from September 2015 until August 2018. Other prominent members have included Sir Eric Harrison, who was the first Deputy of the Liberal Party; Les Bury and Bob Ellicott, who both served as prolific ministers in successive Liberal governments of the 1960s and 1970s; Peter Coleman, who had served as New South Wales Opposition Leader from 1977 until he lost his seat in the 1978 state election; and John Hewson, who served as Opposition Leader from 1990 to 1994. Like Turnbull after him, Hewson served as federal Liberal leader whilst in his second term as the MP for Wentworth.

In August 2018, a challenge by Peter Dutton led to two Liberal leadership spills. Following the second spill on 24 August 2018, Treasurer Scott Morrison defeated Dutton in a leadership ballot. Turnbull did not nominate as a candidate, and immediately resigned as Prime Minister. On 31 August 2018 Turnbull resigned from Parliament, triggering the 2018 Wentworth by-election on 20 October 2018, which was won by independent candidate Kerryn Phelps. Phelps narrowly lost her seat to Liberal Dave Sharma in the 2019 Australian federal election.

Sharma lost the seat in the May 2022 Australian federal election to "teal independent" Allegra Spender.

In 2025, a large swing against the Liberals, alongside major redistribution making the seat more notionally competitive, lead to Labor winning the notional two-party preferred in the electorate for the first time since the electorate's formation in 1901.

== Geography ==
Wentworth is the smallest geographical electoral division in Australia with an area of just 31 square kilometres (12 sq mi), spanning from Woolloomooloo along the southern shore of Sydney Harbour to Watsons Bay, and then down the coast to Clovelly. The division spans an area largely coextensive with Sydney's Eastern Suburbs. The western boundary runs along College Street, Oxford Street, Flinders Street and South Dowling Street, then eastward along Alison Road to Randwick Racecourse and Clovelly Beach. It includes the suburbs of Bellevue Hill, Ben Buckler, Bondi, Bondi Beach, Bondi Junction, Bronte, Centennial Park, Clovelly, Darling Point, Double Bay, Dover Heights, East Sydney, Edgecliff, Elizabeth Bay, Kings Cross, Moore Park, North Bondi, Paddington, Point Piper, Potts Point, Queens Park, Rose Bay, Rushcutters Bay, Tamarama, Vaucluse, Watsons Bay, Waverley and Woollahra; as well as parts of Coogee, Darlinghurst and Randwick.

Since 1984, federal electoral division boundaries in Australia have been determined at redistributions by a redistribution committee appointed by the Australian Electoral Commission. Redistributions occur for the boundaries of divisions in a particular state, and they occur every seven years, or sooner if a state's representation entitlement changes or when divisions of a state are malapportioned.

== Members ==
Image	Member	Party	Term	Notes
	Sir William McMillan (1850–1926)	Free Trade	29 March 1901 – 23 November 1903	Previously held the New South Wales Legislative Assembly seat of Burwood. Retired
	Willie Kelly (1877–1960)	Free Trade	16 December 1903 – 1906	Served as minister under Cook. Retired
	Willie Kelly (1877–1960)	Anti-Socialist	1906 – 26 May 1909	Served as minister under Cook. Retired
	Willie Kelly (1877–1960)	Liberal	26 May 1909 – 17 February 1917	Served as minister under Cook. Retired
	Willie Kelly (1877–1960)	Nationalist	17 February 1917 – 3 November 1919	Served as minister under Cook. Retired
	Walter Marks (1875–1951)	Nationalist	13 December 1919 – September 1929	Lost seat
	Walter Marks (1875–1951)	Ind. Nationalist	September 1929 – 2 December 1929	Lost seat
	Walter Marks (1875–1951)	Australian	2 December 1929 – September 1930	Lost seat
	Walter Marks (1875–1951)	Independent	September 1930 – 7 May 1931	Lost seat
	Walter Marks (1875–1951)	United Australia	7 May 1931 – 19 December 1931	Lost seat
	(Sir) Eric Harrison (1892–1974)	United Australia	19 December 1931 – 21 February 1945	Served as minister under Lyons, Page, Menzies and Fadden. Resigned to become the High Commissioner to the United Kingdom
	(Sir) Eric Harrison (1892–1974)	Liberal	21 February 1945 – 17 October 1956	Served as minister under Lyons, Page, Menzies and Fadden. Resigned to become the High Commissioner to the United Kingdom
	Les Bury (1913–1986)	Liberal	8 December 1956 – 11 April 1974	Served as minister under Menzies, Holt, McEwen, Gorton and McMahon. Lost preselection and retired
	Bob Ellicott (1927–2022)	Liberal	18 May 1974 – 17 February 1981	Served as minister under Fraser. Resigned to become a judge on the Federal Court
	Peter Coleman (1928–2019)	Liberal	11 April 1981 – 5 June 1987	Previously held the New South Wales Legislative Assembly seat of Fuller. Retired
	John Hewson (1946–)	Liberal	11 July 1987 – 28 February 1995	Served as Opposition Leader from 1990 to 1994. Resigned to retire from politics
	Andrew Thomson (1961–)	Liberal	8 April 1995 – 8 October 2001	Served as minister under Howard. Lost preselection and retired
	Peter King (1952–)	Liberal	10 November 2001 – 3 September 2004	Lost preselection and then lost seat
	Peter King (1952–)	Independent	3 September 2004 – 9 October 2004	Lost preselection and then lost seat
	Malcolm Turnbull (1954–)	Liberal	9 October 2004 – 31 August 2018	Served as minister under Howard and Abbott. Served as Opposition Leader from 2008 to 2009. Served as Prime Minister from 2015 to 2018. Resigned to retire from politics
	Kerryn Phelps (1957–)	Independent	20 October 2018 – 18 May 2019	Lost seat
	Dave Sharma (1975–)	Liberal	18 May 2019 – 21 May 2022	Lost seat. Later appointed to the Senate in 2023.
	Allegra Spender (1978–)	Independent	21 May 2022 – 25 June 2026	Incumbent
	Allegra Spender (1978–)	Community Strong Australia	25 June 2026 – present	Incumbent

== Election results ==
2025 Australian federal election: Wentworth
Party	Candidate	Votes	%	±%
Independent	Allegra Spender	40,284	36.48	+7.22
Liberal	Ro Knox	40,155	36.36	−1.17
Labor	Savanna Peake	14,779	13.38	−4.35
Greens	Nick Ward	11,241	10.18	−0.53
One Nation	James Sternhell	2,625	2.38	+1.17
Independent	Michael Richmond	1,347	1.22	+1.22
Total formal votes		110,431	97.26	−0.12
Informal votes		3,106	2.74	+0.12
Turnout		113,537	89.07	+0.50
Notional two-party-preferred count
Labor	Savanna Peake	55,829	50.56	+1.72
Liberal	Ro Knox	54,602	49.44	−1.72
Two-candidate-preferred result
Independent	Allegra Spender	64,429	58.34	+8.92
Liberal	Ro Knox	46,002	41.66	−8.92
Independent hold		Swing	+8.92	
