= Department of Health and Human Services (disambiguation) =

The United States Department of Health and Human Services is a department of the United States federal government.

Department of Health and Human Services may also refer to:

== Australia ==
- Department of Health and Human Services in Victoria
- Department of Human Services and Health, the federal government department that existed between 1993–1996

== United States ==
- Michigan Department of Health and Human Services
- Nebraska Department of Health and Human Services
- Nevada Department of Health and Human Services
- New Hampshire Department of Health and Human Services
- North Carolina Department of Health and Human Services

== See also ==
- Department of Health and Human Services, et al. v. Florida, et al.
- Department of Human Services and Health
- DHHS (disambiguation)
- List of health departments and ministries
