= Department of Health and Family Services =

Australian government department, 1996–1998

Department overview
- Formed: 11 March 1996
- Preceding Department: Department of Human Services and Health
- Dissolved: 21 October 1998
- Superseding Department: Department of Family and Community Services – family and community services matters; Department of Health and Aged Care (I) – for most matters relating to health
- Jurisdiction: Commonwealth of Australia
- Headquarters: Phillip, Canberra
- Minister responsible: Michael Wooldridge, Minister for Health and Family Services
- Department executive: Andrew Podger, Secretary
- Website: health.gov.au

The Department of Health and Family Services was an Australian government department that existed between March 1996 and October 1998.

The department was created after the 1996 federal election in which a new Government was elected, gaining responsibility for the Supported Accommodation Assistance Program from the former Department of Housing and Regional Development.

== Scope ==
Information about the department's functions and government funding allocation could be found in the Administrative Arrangements Orders, the annual Portfolio Budget Statements, in the department's annual reports and on the department's website.

According to the Administrative Arrangements Order made on 11 March 1996, the Department dealt with:

- Services for the aged, people with disabilities and families with children
- Community support services
- Public health and medical research
- Health promotion and disease prevention
- Primary health care of Aboriginal and Torres Strait Islander people
- Pharmaceutical benefits
- Health benefits schemes
- Specific health services, including human quarantine
- National drug abuse strategy
- Regulation of quality of therapeutic goods

== Structure ==
The department was an Australian Public Service department, staffed by officials who were responsible to the Minister.

The Secretary of the Department was Andrew Podger.
