= Chris Higgins (Australian public servant) =

Australian public servant and economist

Secretary of the Department of the Treasury
- In office 19 September 1989 – 6 December 1990

Personal details
- Born: Christopher Ian Higgins; 3 April 1943 Murwillumbah, New South Wales
- Died: 6 December 1990 (aged 47) Bruce, Canberra, Australian Capital Territory
- Spouse(s): Paula Abigail Gomberg (m. 1966–1990; his death)
- Children: 2
- Education: Australian National University; University of Pennsylvania
- Occupation: Public servant

Christopher Ian Higgins (3 April 1943 – 6 December 1990) was a senior Australian public servant and economist. He was Secretary of the Department of the Treasury from September 1989 until his death.

== Life and career ==
Chris Higgins was born in Murwillumbah, New South Wales on 3 April 1943. He attended Ballina High School.

In 1960, Higgins came to Canberra as a Commonwealth Bureau of Statistics Cadet. He graduated in 1964 from the Canberra University College (now known as the Australian National University) with a Bachelor of Economics with first class honours in economics and statistics. He then won a postgraduate scholarship to study for his doctorate at the University of Pennsylvania under supervisor Lawrence Klein.

Between 1975 and 1989, Higgins was a senior executive officer in the Department of the Treasury, including as a deputy secretary from 1984. He was appointed Secretary of the department in September 1989.

=== Death ===
Higgins died in Bruce, Australian Capital Territory from heart failure on 6 December 1990, aged 47, having just won a 3 kilometres (1.9 mi) footrace. On the evening of 6 December he attended a veterans athletics meeting at the AIS. He first ran a 400m then a 3000m race in 12min 8sec coming in 12th place, immediately succumbing to heart attack afterward.

Chris was survived by his wife, Paula Gomberg and his two sons.

The Chris Higgins Prize given for outstanding graduate study in Economics at the Australian National University is named for him.

Government offices
| Preceded by Bernie Fraser | Secretary of the Department of the Treasury; 1989 – 1990 | Succeeded by Tony Cole |
