= John Mellors =

Australian public servant (1947–2021)

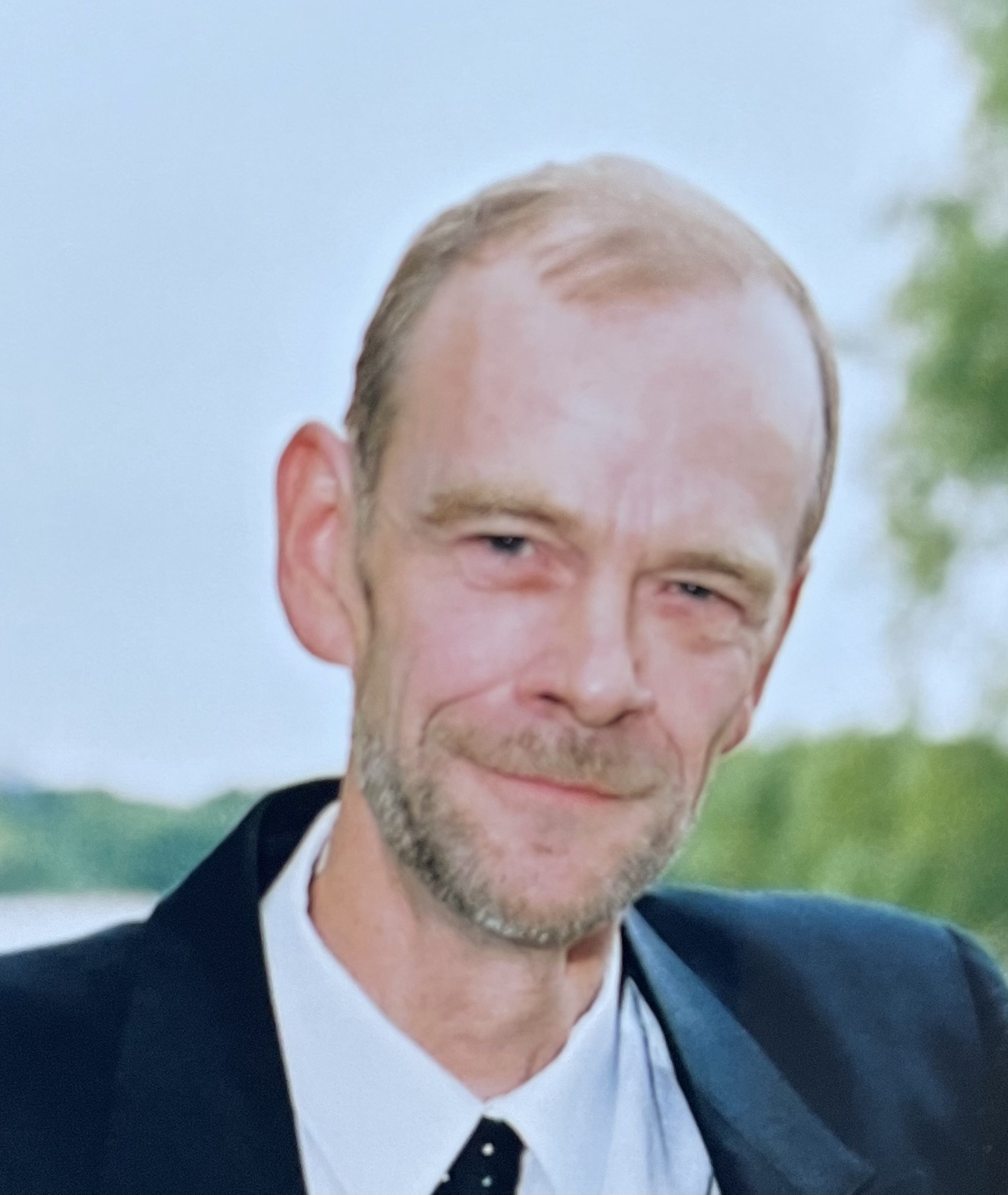
- John Mellors at his son's wedding in Canberra, 2002

Secretary of the Department of Administrative Services
- In office 20 April 1994 – 9 October 1997

Personal details
- Born: 15 April 1947
- Died: 1 May 2021 (aged 74)
- Spouse(s): Christiane Mellors (m.1974; div.2001); Christine Mellors
- Children: Catherine Anne Mellors; Frederick John Mellors
- Occupation: Public servant

John Mellors (15 April 1947 - 1 May 2021) was a former senior Australian public servant. Between 1994 and 1997 he was Secretary of the Department of Administrative Services.

== Life and career ==
Mellors was born in London, gained a degree in economics and accounting from the University of Bristol in 1968 and held academic positions at UK universities from 1969 to 1973. In 1973 he joined the staff of the European Commission in Brussels before being recruited to the Australian Public Service. He became an Australian citizen in 1978.

Mellors was Director-General of the Victorian Department of Planning and Urban Growth between 1988 and 1990, before taking up a position as Executive General Manager in the Corporate Branch of the Department of Administrative Services.

Between 1994 and 1997, Mellors was Secretary of the Department of Administrative Services.

Mellors served in the Australian Public Service for 22 years, but in 1997, when his department was abolished, he was given just five days' notice to leave. According to political journalist Laurie Oakes, Mellors felt angry over the Government's decision for his department, and that he and his executive staff had been wronged by the Government of the day.

Mellors subsequently worked as an international development consultant on both short- and longer -term assignments, primarily in South East Asia and the South Pacific, before retiring in 2013.

== Awards ==
Mellors received a Centenary Medal in 2001 for service to Australian society through public service leadership.

Government offices
Preceded by Andrew Podger	Secretary of the Department of Administrative Services; 1994 – 1997	Succeeded by Peter Boxall as Secretary of the Department of Finance and Administration
