= Stephen Duckett =

Stephen Duckett AM FASSA FAHMS FAICD
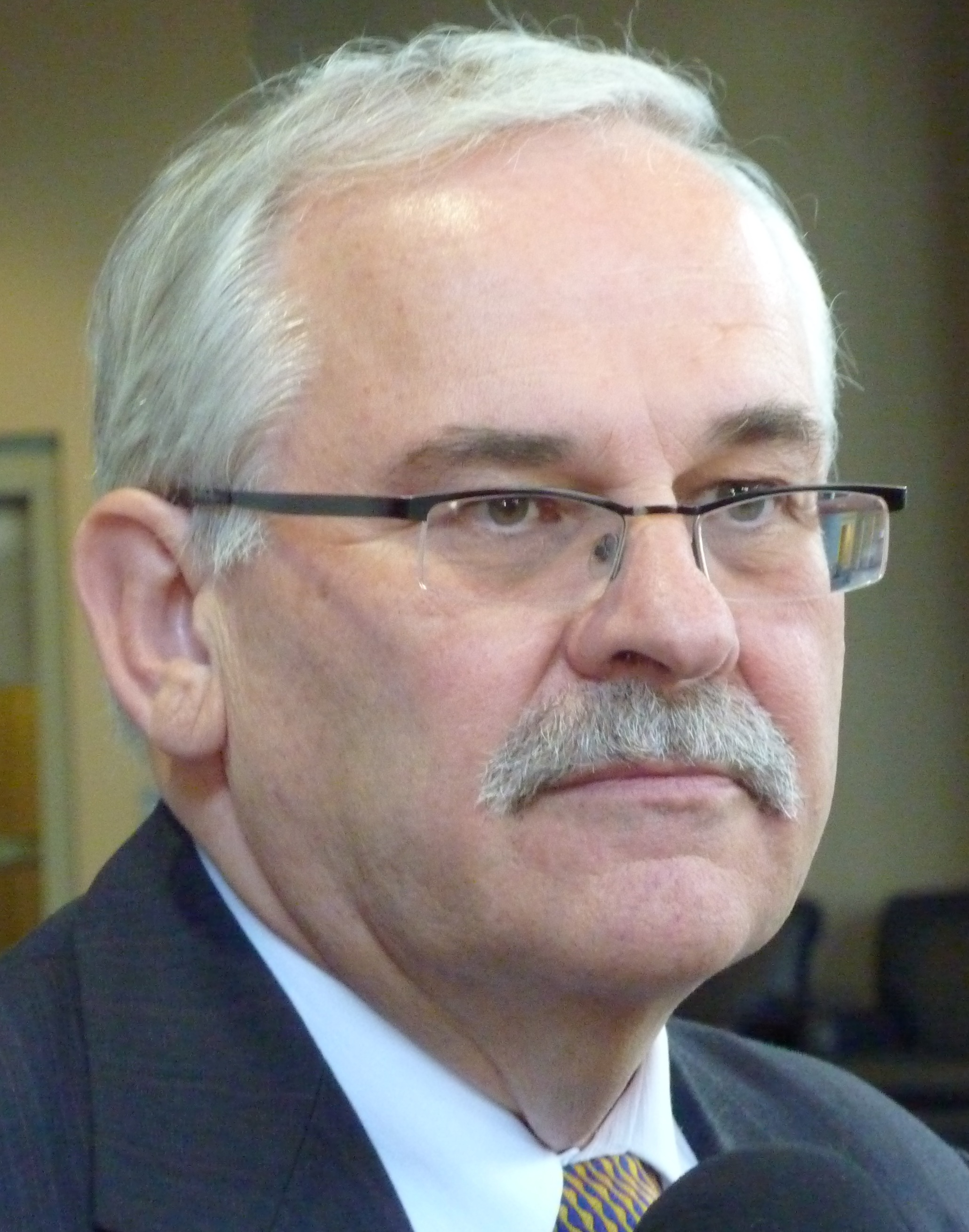

Secretary of the Department of Human Services and Health
- In office 1 July 1994 – 11 March 1996
- Preceded by: Tony Cole
- Succeeded by: Andrew Podger

Personal details
- Born: Stephen John Duckett; 18 February 1950 (age 76) Sydney, Australia
- Spouse: Terri Jackson
- Education: Australian National University; University of New South Wales
- Occupation: Public servant, health service manager, academic, economist

Stephen John Duckett (born 18 February 1950) is a health economist, policy maker and manager who has occupied many leadership roles in health services and universities in both Australia and Canada, including as Secretary of the Commonwealth Department of Health and Ageing and Deputy Chancellor of RMIT University. He is currently a part-time Commissioner with the Australian Tertiary Education Commission.

He was health program director at the Grattan Institute, an Australian public policy think tank, from 2012 to 2022. He is an Honorary Enterprise Professor in the Melbourne School of Public Health, the Department of General Practice and Primary Care and the Melbourne Institute at the University of Melbourne, and is an Emeritus Professor of Health Policy at La Trobe University,. He is currently Chairperson of South Australia's Health Performance Council.

== Educational background ==
Stephen Duckett was born in Sydney and educated at Woollahra Public School (Opportunity classes) and Fort Street High School. He subsequently studied economics at the Australian National University (BEc) and health administration at the University of New South Wales, receiving his MHA in 1972 and his PhD in 1981.

== Career 1970s to 2009 ==
Duckett worked as an academic (Lecturer/Senior Lecturer) in the School of Health Administration at the University of New South Wales from 1974 to 1983. He was an active public commentator supporting Australia's Medicare scheme, and worked with a number of non-government organizations such as the Australian Council of Social Service and the New South Wales Council on the Ageing. His research also examined aspects of hospital administration

He worked in the Victorian health system for a number of years from 1983 including as Regional Director and subsequently Director of Acute Health for the Victorian Department of Health and Community Services, in the latter role he was responsible for introducing case mix funding to Australia. This was the first major application of this approach to hospital funding in a publicly funded health system

Duckett was appointed Departmental Secretary to the Australian Government Department of Human Services and Health on the recommendation of Prime Minister Paul Keating in 1994 and served in that role until the change of government following the 1996 federal election.

From 1996 to 2005 he worked at La Trobe University in Melbourne, Australia as Professor of Health Policy, Dean of the Faculty of Health Sciences and, for part of that period, Pro-Vice-Chancellor, Learning and Teaching. During this period he continued research on aspects of hospital economics and published a book on the Australian health care system.

Duckett served as chair of the board of directors of the Brotherhood of St Laurence (2000–2005) and of Bayside Health (2000–2006).

He was recruited to Queensland Health in 2006 in the wake of the Dr Death scandal, to lead improvements in quality and safety as chief executive officer of the Centre for Healthcare Improvement.

== Alberta Health Services (2009–2010) ==
Duckett was hired by the provincial government of Alberta in the spring of 2009 as president and chief executive officer of its newly created health "superboard", Alberta Health Services with a significant reform agenda. (Alberta Health Services is a quasi-independent agency of the Alberta government created in May 2008 to operate hospitals and other public health services throughout the province of Alberta). Duckett moved to Edmonton Alberta and took up his duties on 23 March of that year.

Shortly after his appointment, the provincial government imposed a significant ($1billion) budget cut on Alberta Health Services. Implementation of these cuts by Alberta Health Services was unpopular and controversial.

=== Cookie controversy ===
On 20 November 2010, Duckett came under scrutiny for televised remarks to the media following a high-level meeting about the situation in the province's emergency rooms. During the aired segment, Duckett refused to answer questions by reporters waiting outside the meeting room, using the excuse he was eating his cookie and that another person had been designated to make comments. He later issued an apology noting that he had not felt comfortable as a non-elected official being asked to respond to the comments of other, elected, officials. He has subsequently stated that he had been instructed by the office of Alberta Premier Stelmach not to make any comments. On 24 November 2010, following political intervention, the chairman of the Alberta Health Services Board announced that, by mutual agreement, Duckett would vacate his role. Both parties felt that his ability to continue in his duties had been "compromised". Three members of the Board of Directors of Alberta Health services also resigned. On 29 July 2011, based on the terms of his contract, Duckett was paid one year's salary as severance pay.

== Career 2011–present ==
After leaving Alberta Health Services, Duckett worked as a professor in the School of Public Health at the University of Alberta, and published a book about the future of the health care system in Canada. He returned to Australia in 2012 and helped to design Australia's new activity based funding arrangements.

=== Grattan Institute ===
In late 2012 Duckett joined Grattan Institute, a domestic public policy think tank based in Melbourne, as head of its Health program. He has since published reports identifying improvements to be made in pricing for Australia's Pharmaceutical Benefits Scheme and ways to improve paying for hospital care. He has also published on improving access to primary care in rural and remote Australia. He left Grattan in 2022, pursuing a 'portfolio career', serving on boards and committees.

=== Post Grattan ===
Since leaving Grattan Institute, Dr Duckett has continued with a 'portfolio' career. He was a member of the South Australian Health Performance Council from 2012 to 2020. In 2021 he was re-appointed as the Council's Chairperson for the next four years, with this appointment extended in 2025 until 2029.

He was appointed a Commissioner of the Australian Tertiary Education Commission effective 1 July 2026 and is leading the Commission's work on costing and pricing of universities.

He joined the Board of Eastern Melbourne Primary Health Network as chair in 2018, and the Board of Healthdirect Australia in 2023. He served on the Council of Royal Melbourne Institute of Technology University from 2014 to 2025, the last two years as Deputy Chancellor.

== Books ==
- Duckett S (2000, 2004, 2007, 2022). The Australian Health Care System. Melbourne, Oxford University Press.
- Duckett S and Willcox, S (2011, 2015) The Australian Health Care System. Melbourne, Oxford University Press.
- Duckett S (2012) Where to from here? Keeping Medicare Sustainable Montreal, McGill-Queen's University Press.
- Duckett S, Peetoom A (2013). Canadian medicare: We need it and we can keep it. Montreal, McGill Queen's University Press.
- Duckett S (2023). Healthcare funding and Christian ethics. Cambridge, Cambridge University Press.

== Awards and recognition ==
Duckett's academic contributions have been recognized by the University of New South Wales by the award of a higher doctorate, Doctor of Science, (DSc), and by election as a Fellow of the Academy of the Social Sciences in Australia (FASSA) in 2004 and of the Australian Academy of Health and Medical Sciences (FAHMS) in 2015. In the 2023 Australia Day Honours he was appointed a Member of the Order of Australia for "significant service to public health policy and management, and to tertiary education".

Government offices
Preceded by Tony Cole as Secretary of the Department of Health, Housing, Local Government and Community Services	Secretary of the Department of Human Services and Health; 1994–1996	Succeeded by Andrew Podger as Secretary of the Department of Health and Family Services
