= DHHS =

DHHS may refer to:

- United States Department of Health and Human Services (also known as HHS)
- Dixie Hollins High School, a high school in Pinellas County, Florida, U.S.
- Druid Hills High School, a high school in DeKalb County, Georgia, U.S.

== See also ==
- Department of Health and Human Services (disambiguation)
