= Australian cricket team in South Africa in 2008–09 =

	South Africa	Australia
- Dates: 20 February 2009 – 17 April 2009
Captains	Graeme Smith	Ricky Ponting

Test series
- Result: Australia won the 3-match series 2–1
Most runs	AB de Villiers (357)	Phillip Hughes (415)
Most wickets	Dale Steyn (16)	Mitchell Johnson (16)
- Player of the series: Mitchell Johnson (Aus)

One Day International series
- Results: South Africa won the 5-match series 3–2
Most runs	Herschelle Gibbs (253)	Brad Haddin (209)
Most wickets	Dale Steyn (10)	Mitchell Johnson (13)
- Player of the series: AB de Villiers (SA)

Twenty20 International series
- Results: South Africa won the 2-match series 2–0
Most runs	Albie Morkel (51)	David Hussey (115)
Most wickets	Robin Peterson (3)	David Hussey (2)
- Player of the series: David Hussey (Aus)

The Australia national cricket team toured South Africa from 20 February to 17 April 2009, playing three Test matches, two Twenty20 Internationals and five One Day Internationals against South Africa.

== Squads ==
Test squads
Australia	South Africa
Ricky Ponting (c)	Graeme Smith (c)
Michael Clarke	Hashim Amla
Doug Bollinger	Mark Boucher (wk)
Brad Haddin (wk)	AB de Villiers
Nathan Hauritz	Jean-Paul Duminy
Ben Hilfenhaus	Paul Harris
Phillip Hughes	Jacques Kallis
Michael Hussey	Neil McKenzie
Mitchell Johnson	Morné Morkel
Simon Katich	Makhaya Ntini
Andrew McDonald	Dale Steyn
Bryce McGain	Lonwabo Tsotsobe
Marcus North	Albie Morkel
Peter Siddle	Imraan Khan
Brett Geeves	Ashwell Prince
Steve Magoffin

Tasmanian Brett Geeves was called up to the Australian squad during the First Test after Doug Bollinger suffered an abdominal-muscle strain while training in the nets. After the First Test of the series, Western Australian fast bowler Steve Magoffin, was flown to join the touring squad as cover for Hilfenhaus and Siddle who were in doubt for the Second Test.
South Africa called up Albie Morkel to replace Lonwabo Tsotsobe who injured his right knee in training during the First Test. With Smith injured, South Africa called up Ashwell Prince and Imraan Khan, and dropped Neil McKenzie and Morné Morkel.

== Test series ==
=== 1st Test ===
26 February – 2 March
Scorecard

Australia	v	South Africa
466 (125.4 overs); Marcus North 117 (233); Dale Steyn 4/113 (30 overs)		220 (81.1 overs); AB de Villiers 104* (185); Mitchell Johnson 4/28 (18.1 overs)
207 (53.4 overs); Phillip Hughes 75 (121); Jacques Kallis 3/22 (5 overs)		291 (119.2 overs); Graeme Smith 69 (110); Mitchell Johnson 4/112 (34.2 overs)

Australia won by 162 runs
New Wanderers Stadium, Johannesburg, South Africa
Umpires: Billy Bowden (NZ) & Steve Bucknor (WI)
Player of the match: Mitchell Johnson

Selections: Australia picked three debutants for this Test (Phillip Hughes, Marcus North and Ben Hilfenhaus) making it the first such time since December 1985 when Geoff Marsh, Merv Hughes and Bruce Reid started their Test careers against India in Adelaide. Doug Bollinger was relegated to twelfth man.

- Australia won the toss and elected to bat.
- Note: this is the first Test match Australia has played under the new "referral" system.

Day One: The conditions provided seam and swing for the bowlers and South Africa took full advantage early to have Australia struggling at 38/3. Ponting (83) and Clarke (68) put on 113 for the fourth wicket before Ponting was bowled by a massive in-swinger from Ntini. After Clarke fell with the score on 182, North (47*) and Haddin (37*) took the score to 254/5 from 68 overs, when bad light, and then rain, stopped play for the day.
Dale Steyn was the pick of the bowlers with 3/82 from 19 overs, being both dangerous and economical early.
Day Two: Haddin and North added 113 for the 5th wicket before the wicket-keeper was caught on 63. Marcus North (117) then continued on to make a century on debut (becoming the 18th Australian to do so, and the first against South Africa.) North and Mitchell Johnson (96*) put on 117 for the 7th wicket (a new record partnership for that wicket against South Africa). Mitchell Johnson later hit 26 from one over from Harris (an Australian Test record) before being stranded on 96 not out when Siddle and Hilfenhaus were dismissed off consecutive deliveries. Australia finished all out for 466.
Steyn 4/113 and Morkel 3/117 were the pick of the bowlers.
South Africa's response did not start well when Smith (0) and Alma (1) were dismissed with only 2 on the board. They finished the day at 85/3, with McKenzie 35* and de Villiers 13*.
Day Three: AB de Villiers (104*) and McKenzie (36) were the only batsmen to pass 30 as South Africa were dismissed for 220.
All the Australian bowlers used took a wicket with Mitchell 4/25 and Siddle 3/76 the best.
The day ended early due to bad light with Australia 51/1 at the close; Hughes 36* and Ponting 1*.
Morné Morkel took the only wicket.
Day Four: From 99/1 Australia lost 4 wickets for 5 runs and were dismissed for 207. Hughes with 75 was the only batsman to pass 50. This gave Australia a lead of 453 with a day and almost 2 sessions to play.
For South Africa, Kallis and Ntini both took 3 wickets.
South Africa in reply started solidly reaching 178/2 from 55 overs at the close. Smith top-scored with 69.
Johnson and Hilfenhaus took a wicket each.
Day Five: South Africa progressed steadily to 206/2 when Amla was dismissed for 57. Wickets then fell steadily with the home team losing 8/85 to be all out for 291 just after tea. Johnson took 4/112, Siddle 3/46, Hilfenhaus 2/68 and McDonald 1/31.

=== 2nd Test ===
6–10 March
Scorecard

Australia	v	South Africa
352 (107.4 overs); Phillip Hughes 115 (151); Dale Steyn 3/83 (25.4 overs)		138 (57.3 overs); JP Duminy 73* (152); Andrew McDonald 3/25 (12 overs)
331/5 dec. (94.4 overs); Phillip Hughes 160 (323); Jacques Kallis 1/21 (8 overs)		370 (132.2 overs); Jacques Kallis 93 (175); Simon Katich 3/45 (11.2 overs)

Australia won by 175 runs
Kingsmead, Durban, South Africa
Umpires: Billy Bowden (NZ) & Asad Rauf (PAK)
Player of the match: Phillip Hughes

Selections: Australia and South Africa both went into the game with unchanged sides.

- Australia won the toss and elected to bat.
- Note: the "referral" system was amended for this Test to allow the third umpire to use "hot-spot" technology.

Day One: Australia's openers put on 184 for the first wicket as Phillip Hughes (115) became the fourth youngest Australian to score a Test century. South Africa's bowlers appeared lethargic before striking back later in the day, but not before Katich (108) had scored his 6th Test century. Australia finished the day at 303/4 with Hussey (37*) and North (17*) at the crease. Bad light stopped play an over short.
Day Two: South Africa's bowlers started the second day in better style and, after a wicketless first hour, found form on a lively pitch to take Australia from 4/329 to be all out for 352. Australia lost 5–4 in 18 deliveries, after Hussey and Steyn has a verbal slanging match mid-pitch. Hussey (50) and North (38) were the only batsmen to score anything over 5 runs for the day. All the bowlers, bar Duminy, took a wicket with Steyn the best with 3/83 from 25.4 overs.
Mitchell Johnson opened the bowling for the visitors and produced one of the best spells of fast, swing bowling seen in some time. He dismissed McKenzie (0) and Alma (0) in his first over, and then struck Graeme Smith on the hand in his second. Smith retired hurt with a broken finger and will take no further part in the match. Johnson later hit Kallis on the chin with a fast bouncer and the South African also retired hurt, though he was to return later in the innings. McDonald took three quick wickets after Tea and South Africa ended an eventful day at 138/7, with Duminy 73* and Steyn 8*.
Day Three: Peter Siddle opened the bowling on day three and wrapped up the South African first innings in three deliveries. JP Duminy did not face a ball. South Africa were dismissed (with Smith not returning to the crease) for 138, giving Australia a first innings lead of 214. Ponting did not enforce the follow-on, and, in reply, Australia produced another 50-run opening stand before Katich (30) was dismissed with the score on 55. Hughes and Ponting (81) then put on a partnership of 164 before Hughes became the youngest player in history to score centuries in each innings of a Test match. Australia finished the day at 292/3.
Day Four: Australia pushed for quick runs on the fourth morning and declared at 331/5 with a lead of 545. Hughes was the pick of the batsmen with 160. With that innings Hughes became the youngest cricketer in the history of the game to achieve the milestone of scoring a century in both innings The South African bowlers spread the wickets around with none taking more than one.
South Africa's second innings began well with Alma (43) opening with McKenzie (31) in the absence of Smith. Both were out by the time the score was 82, both dismissed by Siddle. After that, the experienced pair of Kallis (84*) and De Villiers (68*) appeared to be playing a different game as they took the score to 244/2 at the close: an unbroken partnership of 164.
Going into the fifth day, Australia require 7 wickets for a 2–0 lead in the series, and South Africa 302 runs for a record-breaking win.
Day Five: Kallis (93) and De Villiers (84) extended their partnership to 187 before Kallis fell to Johnson. Wickets then fell steadily throughout the day with South Africa losing 8/103 to be all out for 370 (Smith did not bat in the second innings). This gave Australia the win by 175 runs and a series-winning lead of 2–0.
Katich and Siddle each took three wickets for the visitors.

=== 3rd Test ===
19–23 March
Scorecard

Australia	v	South Africa
209 (72 overs); Simon Katich 55 (160); Dale Steyn 4/56 (16 overs)		651 (154.3 overs); AB de Villiers 163 (196); Mitchell Johnson 4/148 (37.3 overs)
422 (121.5 overs); Mitchell Johnson 123* (103); Paul Harris 6/127 (42.5 overs)

South Africa win by an innings and 20 runs
Newlands, Cape Town, South Africa
Umpires: Steve Bucknor (WI) & Asad Rauf (PAK)
Player of the match: Paul Harris

- This was Steve Bucknor's last Test as umpire.

Selections: In the absence of the injured Smith Jacques Kallis was appointed captain for South Africa. Prince replaced Smith, and Khan replaced McKenzie who had been dropped. Bryce McGain made his Test debut in place of Marcus North who came down with illness.

- Australia won the toss and elected to bat.

Day One: After Ricky Ponting won his sixth toss in a row Australia's openers started slowly, but looked set before Hughes (33) and Ponting (0) were out just before lunch. Hussey (20) and Clarke (0) went soon after and Australia were 4/81. With Katich (55) maintaining one end Haddin (42) and Johnson (35) provided support. Australia were all out for 209.
Of the South African bowlers Ntini was the best—and most unlucky—early before Harris and Steyn broke through. Ntini finished with two wickets, which could easily have been five if catches had been held and inside edges had hit the stumps.
In reply South Africa seemed relatively untroubled with the new opening pair of Prince (37*) and Khan (15*) reaching 57/0 at the close.
Day Two: South Africa lost Khan (20) early on day two but were hardly pressed after that. Prince (150) continued his good domestic form but Alma (46) fell again when seemingly set. Kallis scored his 31st Test century to be 102*, with de Villiers 39*, and South Africa 404/3 at stumps.
The Australian bowlers looked tired and listless in the face of sustained batting with McGain taking a lot of punishment.
Day Three: Kallis went for his overnight score, and Duminy and Boucher also went cheaply and South Africa were 467/6. De Villers and Morkel (58) added 124 for the 7th wicket, before South Africa were all out for 651, a lead of 442 on the first innings. De Villiers scored freely throughout the day to reach 163 before being caught on the fence. He was particularly harsh on McGain and McDonald taking 25 from one over from the second of these.
Johnson finished with 4/138 and Katich 2/9 from 3 overs.
Batting a second time Australia ended the day at 102/2, with a very hard fight ahead of them to save the match.
Day Four: Wickets fell steady during the day until Australia reached 6/218. Johnson (123*) and McDonald (68) then put on 163 for the 7th wicket to get Australia to within sight of making South Africa bat again. Paul Harris cleaned up the tail and Australia had lost by an innings for only the second time against South Africa, and for the first time in any Test match in over a decade. Harris finished with 6/127, and with his 3/34 in the first innings, was named Man of the Match. Johnson scored his maiden Test century off only 86 deliveries.

== Twenty20 Series ==
=== 1st Twenty20 ===
27 March
Scorecard

Australia; 166/7 (20 overs)	v	South Africa; 168/6 (19.2 overs)
David Hussey 88* (44); Robin Peterson 3/30 (4 overs)		Albie Morkel 37 (19); David Hussey 2/21 (4 overs)

South Africa won by 4 wickets
New Wanderers Stadium, Johannesburg, South Africa
Umpires: Marais Erasmus and Rudi Koertzen
Player of the match: David Hussey

- South Africa won the toss and elected to field

=== 2nd Twenty20 ===
29 March
Scorecard

South Africa; 156/5 (20 overs)	v	Australia; 139/8 (20 overs)
Roelof van der Merwe 48 (30); Shane Harwood 2/21 (4 overs)		David Hussey 27 (18); Johan Botha 2/16 (4 overs)

South Africa won by 17 runs
SuperSport Park, Centurion, South Africa
Umpires: Marais Erasmus & Brian Jerling (both RSA)
Player of the match: Roelof van der Merwe

- Australia won the toss and elected to field

== ODI series ==
=== 1st ODI ===
3 April
Scorecard

Australia; 286/7 (50 overs)	v	South Africa; 145 (33.1 overs)
Michael Hussey 83* (79); Dale Steyn 2/45 (9 overs)		Graeme Smith 52 (56); Nathan Hauritz 4/29 (8.1 overs)

Australia won by 141 runs
Kingsmead, Durban, South Africa
Umpires: Asoka De Silva (SRL) & Rudi Koertzen (RSA)
Player of the match: Michael Hussey

- Australia won the toss and elected to bat.

=== 2nd ODI ===
5 April
Scorecard

Australia; 131 (40.2 overs)	v	South Africa; 132/3 (26.2 overs)
Callum Ferguson 50 (83); Wayne Parnell 4/25 (8 overs)		Graeme Smith 40 (48); Mitchell Johnson 2/47 (10 overs)

South Africa won by 7 wickets
SuperSport Park, Centurion, South Africa
Umpires: Asoka De Silva (SRL) & Brian Jerling (RSA)
Player of the match: Wayne Parnell

- Australia won the toss and elected to bat.

=== 3rd ODI ===
9 April
Scorecard

South Africa; 289/6 (50 overs)	v	Australia; 264/7 (50 overs)
AB de Villiers 80 (87); Mitchell Johnson 4/34 (10 overs)		James Hopes 63* (60); Roelof van der Merwe 3/37 (10 overs)

South Africa won by 25 runs
Newlands, Cape Town, South Africa
Umpires: Asoka de Silva (SRL) & Rudi Koertzen (RSA)
Player of the match: Jacques Kallis

- South Africa won the toss and elected to bat.

=== 4th ODI ===
13 April
Scorecard

South Africa; 317/6 (50 overs)	v	Australia; 256 (45.5 overs)
Herschelle Gibbs 110 (116); Shane Harwood 2/57 (10 overs)		Brad Haddin 78 (61); Dale Steyn 4/44 (7.5 overs)

South Africa won by 61 runs
St George's Park, Port Elizabeth, South Africa
Umpires: Asoka de Silva (SRL) & Brian Jerling (RSA)
Player of the match: Herschelle Gibbs

- Australia won the toss and elected to field.

=== 5th ODI ===
17 April
Scorecard

Australia; 303/7 (50 overs)	v	South Africa; 256 (45.5 overs)
Michael Clarke 66 (60); JP Duminy 3/48 (10 overs)		Herschelle Gibbs 82 (110); Mitchell Johnson 3/58 (8.5 overs)

Australia won by 47 runs
New Wanderers Stadium, Johannesburg, South Africa
Umpires: Asoka de Silva (SRL) & Rudi Koertzen (RSA)

- Australia won the toss and elected to bat.

== Only Tour Match-First Class:South African A vs Australians ==
20–22 February
Scorecard

South Africa A	v	(Australia) Australians
403/7 dec (93.3 overs); Imraan Khan 100; Ben Hilfenhaus 2/64 (21 overs)		360/5 dec (86 overs); Simon Katich 124* (ret.); Imran Tahir 2/92 (18 overs)
182 (41.1 overs); Heino Kuhn 47; Marcus North 6/69 (11 overs)		171/4 (40.4 overs); Phillip Hughes 53* (ret.); Imran Tahir 2/25 (7.4 overs)

Match drawn
Senwes Park, Potchefstroom, South Africa
Umpires: Marais Erasmus and Ian Howell

== See also ==
- List of Australia Test cricket records
