= Macksville High School =

Location
- Boundary Street, Macksville, Mid North Coast, New South Wales; Australia; 30°42′47″S 152°55′00″E

Information
- Type: Government-funded co-educational comprehensive secondary day school
- Motto: Growth of the mind Developing the person
- Established: 1950; 76 years ago
- Sister school: Jambi Sumatera, Indonesia
- School district: Mid Coast Valleys; Regional North
- Educational authority: NSW Department of Education
- Principal: Sheree Burnham
- Teaching staff: 48 FTE (2024)
- Employees: 61.7 FTE (2024)
- Enrolment: 448 (2024)
- Colours: Maroon, green, yellow and blue

Macksville High School is a government-funded co-educational comprehensive secondary day school, located in Macksville, in the Mid North Coast region of New South Wales, Australia.

Established in 1950, the school enrolled 448 students in 2024, from Year 7 to Year 12, of whom 17 percent identified as Indigenous Australians and five percent were from a language background other than English. The school is operated by the NSW Department of Education; the principal is Sheree Burnham.

== Overview ==
The school was established in 1950 and 50 year celebrations were held in 2000.

In March 1971, the high school was the site of a siege in which a 19-year-old held police at bay with a .22 calibre rifle for almost three hours.

The school has a sister school relationship with Jambi Sumatera, Indonesia.

== Notable alumni ==
- Rear Admiral Mark Bonser – Australian senior naval officer
- Tony Cole – public servant who served as the secretary of the Australian Treasury between 1991 and 1993
- Phillip Hughes – cricketer; his funeral was held at the high school
- Greg Inglis – rugby league football player
- Billie McKay – chef who won series 7 of MasterChef Australia in 2015

== See also ==
- List of government schools in New South Wales: G–P
- List of schools in the Northern Rivers and Mid North Coast
- Education in Australia
