= Department of Health and Aged Care (1998–2001) =

Australian government department, 1998–2001

Department overview
- Formed: 21 October 1998
- Preceding Department: Department of Health and Family Services
- Dissolved: 26 November 2001
- Superseding Department: Department of Health and Ageing
- Jurisdiction: Commonwealth of Australia
- Headquarters: Phillip, Canberra
- Minister responsible: Michael Wooldridge, Minister for Health and Aged Care
- Department executive: Andrew Podger, Secretary
- Website: health.gov.au (archived)

The Department of Health and Aged Care was an Australian government department that existed between October 1998 and November 2001.

The Department was created after the 1998 federal election, named to reflect new departmental responsibilities and functions.

== Scope ==
Information about the department's functions and government funding allocation could be found in the Administrative Arrangements Orders, the annual Portfolio Budget Statements, in the Department's annual reports and on the Department's website.

According to the Administrative Arrangements Order made on 21 October 1998, the Department dealt with:

- Services for the aged, including carers
- Public health and medical research
- Health promotion and disease prevention
- Primary health care of Aboriginal and Torres Strait Islander people
- Pharmaceutical benefits
- Health benefits schemes
- Specific health services, including human quarantine
- National drug abuse strategy
- Regulation of quality of therapeutic goods

== Structure ==
The Department was an Australian Public Service department, staffed by officials who were responsible to the Minister for Health and Aged Care, Michael Wooldridge.

The Secretary of the Department was Andrew Podger.
