= Andrew Podger =

Andrew Podger AO

Secretary of the Department of the Arts and Administrative Services
- In office 1993–1994

Secretary of the Department of Administrative Services
- In office 1994–1994

Secretary of the Department of Housing and Regional Development
- In office 1994–1996

Secretary of the Department of Health and Family Services
- In office 1996–1998

Secretary of the Department of Health and Aged Care
- In office 1998–2001

Commissioner of the Australian Public Service
- In office 2002–2004

Personal details
- Born: Andrew Stuart Podger; 6 November 1948 (age 78)
- Occupation: Public servant, author and academic

Andrew Stuart Podger, AO (born 6 November 1948) is a retired Australian senior public servant. He is currently Professor of Public Policy at the Australian National University.

== Early life ==
Podger was born 6 November 1948.

== Public service career ==
Podger began his Commonwealth Public Service career in 1968 as a cadet at the Australian Bureau of Statistics. After his time as a statistician he moved to the Social Welfare Commission in 1974 and then to the Department of Prime Minister and Cabinet in 1975. He was promoted to the Senior Executive Service in the Department of Social Security in 1978, where he stayed until 1982.

In 1982 he joined the Department of Finance. In 1990 Podger went on to hold the position of Deputy Secretary in charge of Acquisition and Logistics in the Department of Defence, where he stayed until 1993.

He was appointed Secretary of the Department of the Arts and Administrative Services in 1993, shortly thereafter renamed the Department of Administrative Services. He was appointed Secretary of the Department of Housing and Regional Development in April 1994. He then became Secretary of the Department of Health and Family Services in 1996 (later Health and Aged Care).

He then was appointed the Public Service Commissioner in 2002, a role he continued until 2004 when he agreed to head a Task Force in the Department of the Prime Minister and Cabinet to examine how to improve the delivery of health services.

== Awards ==
Podger was appointed an Officer of the Order of Australia (AO) in 2004.

== References and further reading ==
- Podger, Andrew (June 2009), The Role of Departmental Secretaries: Personal reflections on the breadth of responsibilities today, ISBN 9781921536809

Government offices
Preceded by Helen Williams	Commissioner of the Australian Public Service; 2002–2004	Succeeded by Lynelle Briggs
Preceded by Himself as Secretary of the Department of Health and Family Services	Secretary of the Department of Health and Aged Care; 1998–2001	Succeeded by Jane Halton as Secretary of the Department of Health and Ageing
Preceded by Stephen Duckett as Secretary of the Department of Human Services and Health	Secretary of the Department of Health and Family Services; 1996–1998	Succeeded by Himself as Secretary of the Department of Health and Aged Care
Preceded by Stephen Duckett as Secretary of the Department of Human Services and Health	Secretary of the Department of Health and Family Services; 1996–1998	Succeeded by David Rosalky as Secretary of the Department of Family and Community Services
Preceded by Stephen Duckett as Secretary of the Department of Human Services and Health	Secretary of the Department of Housing and Regional Development; 1994–1996	Succeeded by Allan Hawke as Secretary of the Department of Transport and Regional Development
Preceded by Himself as Secretary of the Department of the Arts and Administrative Services	Secretary of the Department of Administrative Services; 1994	Succeeded by John Mellors
Preceded by Noel Tanzer	Secretary of the Department of the Arts and Administrative Services; 1993–1994	Succeeded by Himself as Secretary of the Department of Administrative Services
Preceded by Noel Tanzer	Secretary of the Department of the Arts and Administrative Services; 1993–1994	Succeeded by Tony Blunn as Secretary of the Department of the Arts, Sport, the Environment and Territories
