= Ballina Coast High School =

Location
- Cherry Street, Ballina, Northern Rivers region, New South Wales; Australia; 28°52′03″S 153°33′53″E

Information
- Type: Government-funded co-educational comprehensive secondary day school
- Established: 1956; 70 years ago (as Ballina High School)
- School district: Lennox Coast; Regional North
- Educational authority: NSW Department of Education
- Principal: Peter Howes
- Teaching staff: 67.9 FTE (2025)
- Years: 7–12
- Enrolment: 722 (2025)
- Campus type: Regional
- Website: ballina-h.schools.nsw.gov.au

Ballina Coast High School is a government-funded co-educational comprehensive secondary day school, located on Cherry Street, in Ballina, in the Northern Rivers region of New South Wales, Australia.

Established in 1956 as Ballina High School, the school enrolled 722 students in 2025, from Year 7 to Year 12, of whom 19 percent identified as Indigenous Australians and eight percent were from a language background other than English. The school is operated by the NSW Department of Education; the current principal is Peter Howes.

== History ==
Ballina High School was established in 1956 in Burnett Street, Ballina; as the first high school in Ballina to be opened. In 2013, approximately 470 students were enrolled. In February 2015 it was announced that students in Year 7 to Year 12 at both Ballina High School and Southern Cross K–12 would combine to form the $40 million super school "Ballina Coast High School". New school and community facilities were built on the existing Ballina High School site and completed prior to the 2019 school year. Southern Cross will continue to cater for students in Year K to Year 6 and support units and will be the site for all distance education in Ballina. In 2017 demolition of Ballina High School began and the remaining students in Year 8 to Year 12 were moved to the Southern Cross campus along with the first year to begin the formation of Ballina Coast High School.

== Notable alumni ==
- Simon Baker – actor
- Chris Higgins – economist
- Francine McRae – softball player
- Kerry Saxby-Junna – race walker

== See also ==
- List of government schools in New South Wales
- List of schools in the Northern Rivers and Mid North Coast
- Education in Australia
