= Michael Wooldridge (politician) =

Australian doctor and politician

The Honourable Dr Michael Wooldridge

Minister for Health and Aged Care
- In office 21 October 1998 – 26 November 2001
- Prime Minister: John Howard
- Preceded by: Himself
- Succeeded by: Kay Patterson

Minister for Health and Family Services
- In office 11 March 1996 – 21 October 1998
- Prime Minister: John Howard
- Preceded by: Carmen Lawrence
- Succeeded by: Himself

Deputy Leader of the Liberal Party
- In office 23 March 1993 – 23 May 1994
- Leader: John Hewson
- Preceded by: Peter Reith
- Succeeded by: Peter Costello

Member of the Australian Parliament for Casey
- In office 3 October 1998 – 8 October 2001
- Preceded by: Bob Halverson
- Succeeded by: Tony Smith

Member of the Australian Parliament for Chisholm
- In office 11 July 1987 – 3 October 1998
- Preceded by: Helen Mayer
- Succeeded by: Anna Burke

Personal details
- Born: Michael Richard Lewis Wooldridge; 7 November 1956 (age 70) Melbourne, Victoria, Australia
- Party: Liberal
- Relations: Mary Wooldridge (sister)
- Education: Monash University

Michael Richard Lewis Wooldridge (born 7 November 1956) is an Australian doctor, company director, and former politician. He served as deputy leader of the Liberal Party from 1993 to 1994, under John Hewson. In the Howard government, he held ministerial office as Minister for Health and Family Services (1996–1998) and Health and Aged Care (1998–2001). He represented the Liberals in the House of Representatives as the member for Chisholm (1987–1998) and Casey (1998–2001).

== Early years ==
Wooldridge was born in Melbourne on 7 November 1956. The son of a real estate agent, he grew up in the suburb of Surrey Hills and attended Scotch College, Melbourne. He went on to Monash University, initially studying economics and politics before transferring to a science degree and then studying medicine. He graduated in 1981 and completed his residency at The Alfred Hospital.

== Federal political career ==
Wooldridge was elected to the House of Representatives at the 1987 federal election, winning the seat of Chisholm from the incumbent Australian Labor Party (ALP) MP Helen Mayer.

During his time in Opposition he was Deputy Leader of the Liberal Party and therefore the Deputy Leader of the Opposition from March 1993 to May 1994. He was 36 years old when he became deputy opposition leader, becoming the youngest person to hold the position. In May 1994, Liberal Leader John Hewson called a spill for both the leader's and deputy's positions. Hewson lost to Alexander Downer while Wooldridge withdrew at the last minute as it became clear he did not have the numbers to beat Downer's running mate Peter Costello.

Wooldridge's demise as deputy leader came as a result of an opinion poll that showed only 4% of voters preferred him as Liberal leader despite Wooldridge himself stating he had no desire to become leader. In response to this poll, Wooldridge argued on The 7.30 Report that 4% was a good result for a deputy leader as the deputy leader was not meant to be an alternative leader. Ironically the man who replaced him as deputy leader, Costello, did not succeed in his ambitions to become leader and eventually became the party's longest serving deputy leader.

As well as expressing no desire to become leader, Wooldridge as deputy leader did not request to become Shadow Treasurer, making him one of a few deputy leaders who never held the Treasury portfolio either in government or in opposition.

Wooldridge's reason for not taking up Treasury was his belief that his strength was in social policy area and that Treasury would take him "a year to get up to speed".

In 1996, the Liberal and National Parties were elected to Government and Wooldridge served as Minister for Health and Family Services from 1996 to 1998 and Minister for Health and Aged Care from 1998 up to his retirement in 2001. During his last term, he transferred from his marginal seat of Chisholm to the somewhat friendlier seat of Casey.

During this time he instituted significant and widespread changes to general practice. By setting up and responding to the report: "General Practice, Responding to the Future With Partnerships", he commenced a reform process that cemented the divisions of general practice as change agents, took responsibility for training GPs away from the RACGP and into the hands of an independent body (General Practice Education and Training), and instituted the Practice Incentives Program. He was forced to make a public apology to the President of the Australian Medical Association at the time, Kerryn Phelps in 2001 for publicly claiming she had no medical qualifications. During Woolridge's term as Health Minister, he was criticised for having close links with multinational drug company, Pfizer that impacted the independence of the Pharmaceutical Benefits Advisory Committee (PBAC). Wooldridge was also criticised for appointing Pat Clear, a former executive of Glaxo-Wellcome Australia who had recently retired as head of Medicines Australia (then known as the Australian Pharmaceutical Manufacturers' Association) to the committee of the PBAC, prompting the immediate resignation of the Chair of the committee, Emeritus Professor Don Birkett, and leading to the refusal of five of the other committee members to be reappointed.

== Career after politics ==
In 2002, Wooldridge's contract with the Royal Australian College of General Practitioners was terminated due to allegations from the Australian Medical Association and the Federal Opposition that his involvement in the allocation of the $5,000,000 as well with his recent retirement as Health Minister represented a conflict of interest; in 2003 the parties settled and Wooldridge received a $382,500 payout. In 2006, Wooldridge was appointed 'Lead Independent Director' of the ASX listed Australian Pharmaceuticals Industry Limited. In September 2009, Wooldridge was invited to join a panel hosted by CSL Limited "a major manufacturer [of flu vaccine] in a US$2 billion influenza industry" hosted by the company to dispel myths about swine flu vaccination.

Wooldridge has served on the Boards of Resonance Health Ltd, Dia-b Tech Limited (resigned in 2009, company since de-listed) and a Director of CogState Ltd. He is currently Chairman of Neurosciences Australia, Healthsource Australia (Ministerial Advisory Committee on AIDS, Sexual Health and Hepatitis), the CRC for Mental Health and the Oral Health Cooperative Research Centre. He is also Associate Professor at the University of Melbourne.

In December 2013, Wooldridge and four other directors of Australian Property Custodian Holdings Ltd (APCHL) were found liable by the Federal Court for breaching their duties as officers of APCHL. APCHL was the responsible entity of the Prime Retirement and Aged Care Property Trust (Prime Trust), a managed investment scheme which owned retirement villages in Queensland, NSW and Victoria. APCHL collapsed in 2010 when administrators were appointed owing investors approximately $550 million. On 2 December 2014 he was banned as a company director for more than two years over his role in Prime Trust. Other directors, including founder Bill Lewski, received bans up to 15 years.

Wooldridge has also served on the board of the anti-wind energy activism organisation, the Waubra Foundation, along with other prominent anti-wind energy activists, including Sarah Laurie, Peter Mitchell, and Kathy Russell. The Waubra Foundation promotes the view that wind turbines cause ill health. Wooldridge and family are objectors to the Bald Hills wind farm in Gippsland Victoria.

Michael Wooldridge is the brother of Mary Wooldridge, Mental Health Minister in the Victorian State Government 2010–14.

Parliament of Australia
Preceded by Helen Mayer	Member for Chisholm; 1987–1998	Succeeded by Anna Burke
Preceded by Bob Halverson	Member for Casey; 1998–2001	Succeeded by Tony Smith
Political offices
Preceded by Carmen Lawrence	Minister for Health and Family Services; 1996–1998	Succeeded by Jocelyn Newman
Preceded by Carmen Lawrence	Minister for Health and Aged Care; 1998–2001	Succeeded by Kay Patterson
Party political offices
Preceded by Peter Reith	Deputy Leader of the Liberal Party of Australia; 1993–1994	Succeeded by Peter Costello
