= Phillip Hughes =

Australian cricketer (1988–2014)

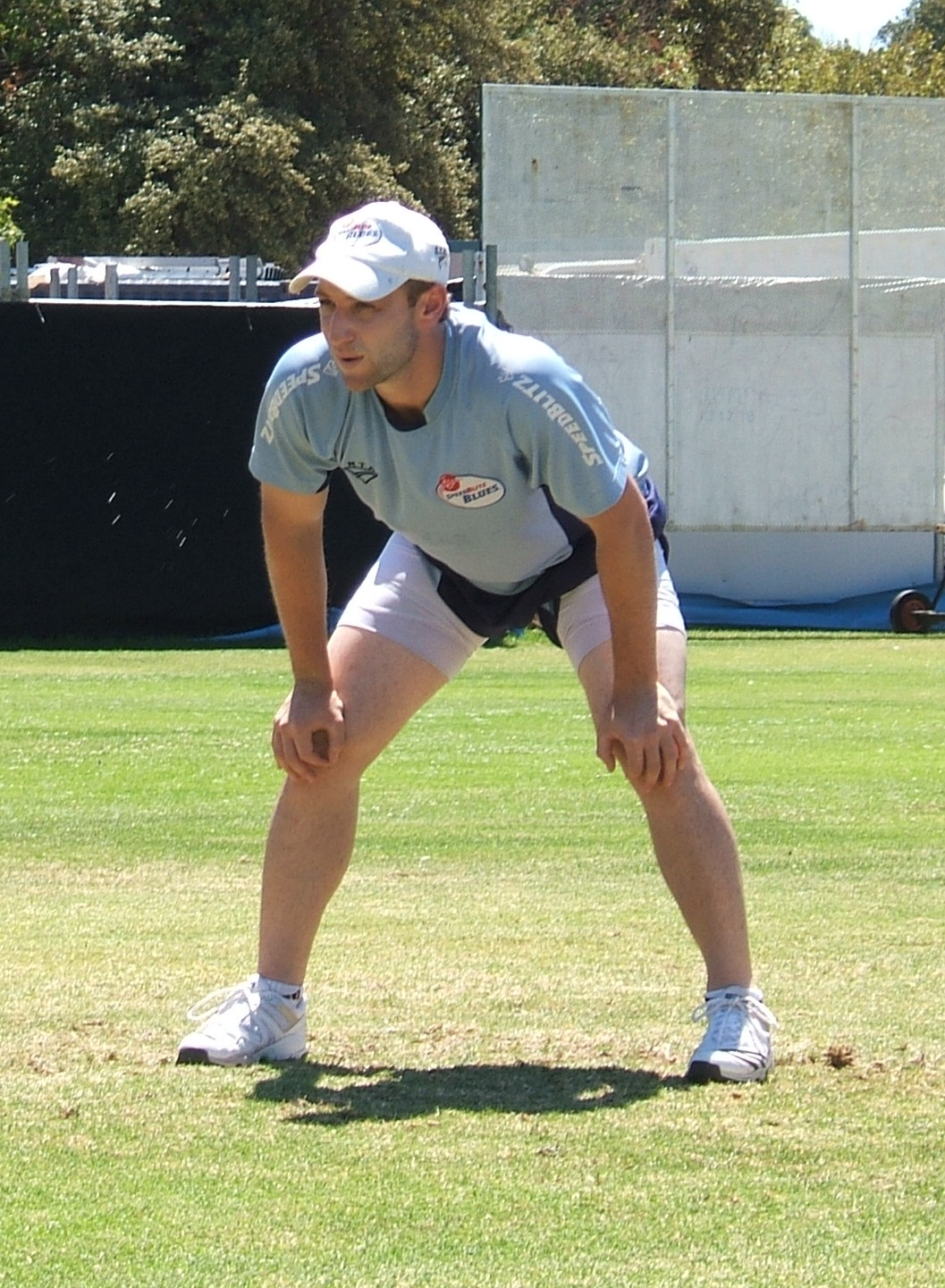
- Hughes in 2010

Personal information
- Full name: Phillip Joel Hughes
- Born: 30 November 1988; Macksville, New South Wales, Australia
- Died: 27 November 2014 (aged 25); Sydney, New South Wales, Australia
- Nickname: Hughesy, Don, Hugh Dog
- Height: 170 cm (5 ft 7 in)
- Batting: Left-handed
- Bowling: Right-arm off break
- Role: Opening batsman

International information
- National side: Australia (2009–2014)
- Test debut (cap 408): 26 February 2009 v South Africa
- Last Test: 18 July 2013 v England
- ODI debut (cap 198): 11 January 2013 v Sri Lanka
- Last ODI: 12 October 2014 v Pakistan
- ODI shirt no.: 64

Domestic team information
- Years: Team
- 2007/08–2011/12: New South Wales
- 2009: Middlesex
- 2010: Hampshire
- 2012: Worcestershire
- 2012/13–2014/15: South Australia
- 2012/13–2013/14: Adelaide Strikers

Career statistics
Competition	Test	ODI	FC	LA
Matches	26	25	114	91
Runs scored	1,535	826	9,023	3,639
Batting average	32.66	35.91	46.51	47.25
100s/50s	3/7	2/4	26/46	8/23
Top score	160	138*	243*	202*
Catches/stumpings	15/–	5/–	72/–	30/–
- Source: CricketArchive, 25 November 2014

Phillip Joel Hughes (30 November 1988 – 27 November 2014) was an Australian Test and One Day International (ODI) cricketer who played domestic cricket for South Australia and Worcestershire. He was a left-handed opening batsman who played for two seasons with New South Wales before making his Test debut in 2009 at the age of 20. He made his ODI debut in 2013.

Hughes scored his first Test century in March 2009, aged 20, in his second Test match for Australia, opening the batting and hitting 115 in the first innings against South Africa in Durban. This made Hughes Australia's youngest Test centurion since Doug Walters in 1965. In the second innings of the same match, Hughes scored 160, becoming the youngest cricketer to score centuries in both innings of a Test match (Australia won the match by 175 runs). On 11 January 2013, he became the first Australian batsman to score a century on debut in an ODI, a feat which he achieved against Sri Lanka in Melbourne.

On 25 November 2014, Hughes was hit in the neck by a bouncer from Sean Abbott, during a Sheffield Shield match at the Sydney Cricket Ground, causing a vertebral artery dissection that led to a subarachnoid hemorrhage. The Australian team doctor, Peter Brukner, noted that only 100 such dissections had ever been reported, with "only one [prior] case reported as a result of a cricket ball". Hughes was taken to St Vincent's Hospital in Sydney, where he underwent surgery, was placed into an induced coma, and was in intensive care in a critical condition. He never regained consciousness, and died on 27 November 2014.

== Early life and junior career ==
Hughes was born in Macksville, New South Wales, to father Greg, a banana farmer, and Italian mother, Virginia. Hughes was also a talented rugby league footballer who once played alongside former Australia international Greg Inglis. He played his junior cricket for Macksville RSL Cricket Club, where he excelled so quickly that he was playing A-Grade at the age of 12 and in Representative Cricket he scored a century. At the age of 17, Hughes moved from Macksville to Sydney to play for Western Suburbs District Cricket Club in Sydney Grade Cricket while he attended Homebush Boys High. He scored 141* on his grade debut and enjoyed a solid 2006–07 season, scoring 752 runs at an average of 35.81, with a highest score of 142*. He represented Australia at the 2008 ICC Under-19 Cricket World Cup. He was coached at Triforce Sports Cricket Centre in Mortlake.

== First-class career ==
After scoring runs prolifically for New South Wales youth teams and Western Suburbs in Grade Cricket, Hughes was handed a rookie contract by New South Wales for the 2007–08 season. After scores of 51 and 137 for the New South Wales Second XI against Victoria's Second XI, he was rewarded with a call-up by Blues selectors to make his first-class debut. He played his first senior game against Tasmania on 20 November 2007 at the Sydney Cricket Ground. At 18 years and 355 days, Hughes was the youngest New South Wales debutant since Michael Clarke in 1999. In a comfortable victory for New South Wales, Hughes opened the batting and got his career off to a solid start, scoring a fluent 51 and taking 2 catches.

Hughes had an outstanding debut season for New South Wales, playing seven matches and scoring 559 runs at an average of 62.11 with one century and six 50s. The highlight of Hughes's excellent season came in New South Wales' Pura Cup final victory over Victoria. He scored 116 off 175 balls in the Blues' second innings to help put his team in a commanding position. At 19 years of age, this innings made him the youngest-ever player to score a century in a Sheffield Shield final. Hughes was rewarded for his achievements by winning the New South Wales Rising Star Award and earning an upgrade to a full state contract for the 2008–09 season.

Hughes was signed by Middlesex on a short-term contract, as cover for Murali Kartik, for the beginning of the 2009 English cricket season. He was available for the first six weeks of the season and played in three County Championship matches, all eight of Middlesex's Friends Provident Trophy group matches and the first few matches in the Panthers' defence of the Twenty20 Cup. In most other years, a contract for the opening six weeks of the season would involve playing four to six championship matches, some but not all FPT matches, and no Twenty20, but the scheduling for 2009 had to accommodate ICC World Twenty20 and the eventually-cancelled Stanford Super Series. Despite Hughes holding an Italian passport by virtue of his Italian mother, Middlesex resisted signing him up as a Kolpak player and instead signed him as a foreign player. He enjoyed strong success in England, scoring 574 runs in his three first-class matches, including three hundreds, at an average of 143.50. Of his time at Middlesex, Hughes commented:

I thoroughly enjoyed it and the preparation has been great. The big thing that came out of it was that I played at three Test grounds I'm going to be playing on and got to experience them before this big series coming up. Lord's was my home ground there for Middlesex and I played at The Oval as well and Edgbaston. It couldn't have really worked out any better. The big thing was just going over there to experience the whole different culture really, the weather, the wickets and the bowlers as well."

Hughes hit consecutive hundreds at the end of the 2010/11 season to earn the praise of Australian chairman of selectors Andrew Hilditch. In his last two first-class matches for New South Wales in the 2010/11 season he scored 54, 115, 138 and 93. Australia's chairman of selectors, Andrew Hilditch, said "I was thrilled for Phil, I think he turned the corner the last game. I spent a bit of time with him before the last Shield game and he seemed to be in a really good place. Having had a tough season, to emerge like he has is a credit to him."

== List A career ==
Less than a week after his debut in first-class cricket, on 28 November 2007, Hughes made his List A debut in against Victoria at the Melbourne Cricket Ground. While he was not originally scheduled to play the match, sickness to Australian opening batsman Phil Jaques handed him the spot. Just as he did in his first-class debut, Hughes passed 50 but was eventually dismissed for 68, top scoring for New South Wales in a "controlled" display.

After New South Wales' wicket-keeper Brad Haddin was struck in the head by a top edge, Hughes took on the keeping duties for nine overs. On 17 May 2009, Hughes made his first limited overs century, scoring 119 for Middlesex against Warwickshire. On 29 July 2014, he made a double century (202 not out from 151 balls) in a match with South Africa A in Darwin.

== Australian international career ==
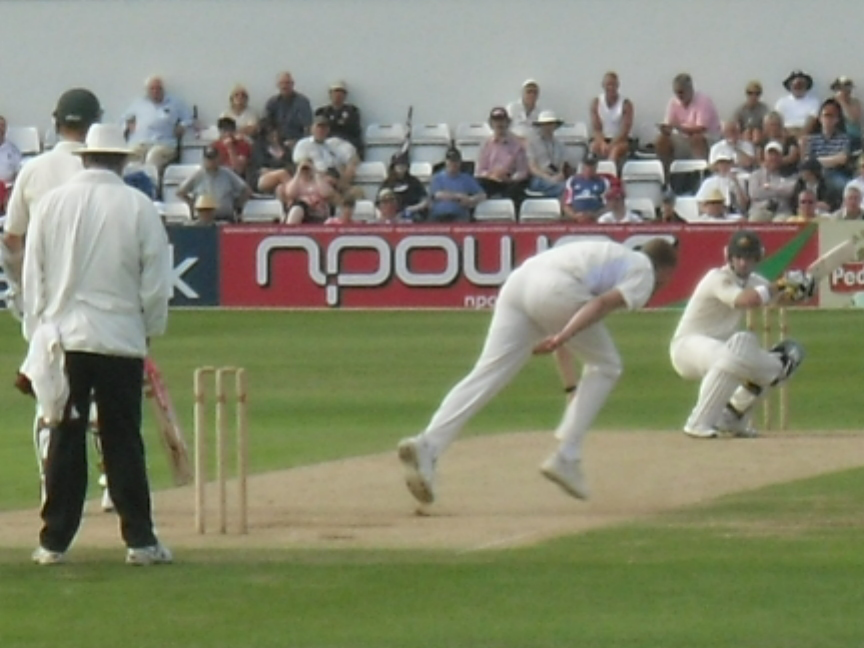
Ducking to a short ball that, according to critics, caused him problems in England.

After consistently making runs at domestic level, Hughes was called up to replace Matthew Hayden on Australia's tour of South Africa in February and March 2009. He was selected to make his debut in the first Test match starting on 26 February 2009 at the New Wanderers Stadium in Johannesburg after making 53, then retiring, in Australia's tour match against the South African Board President's XI. He was dismissed for a duck in his first Test innings by Dale Steyn off just the fourth ball of the match, however he went on to top-score with 75 in the second innings, including 11 fours and a six.

Hughes hit his maiden Test century in the first innings of the second Test at the Sahara Stadium, Kingsmead, Durban, on 6 March 2009, before adding another hundred in the second Innings. In doing so, at the age of 20 years and 96 days, he became both the youngest Australian since Doug Walters to score a Test century and the youngest player from any country to score a century in both innings of a Test match.

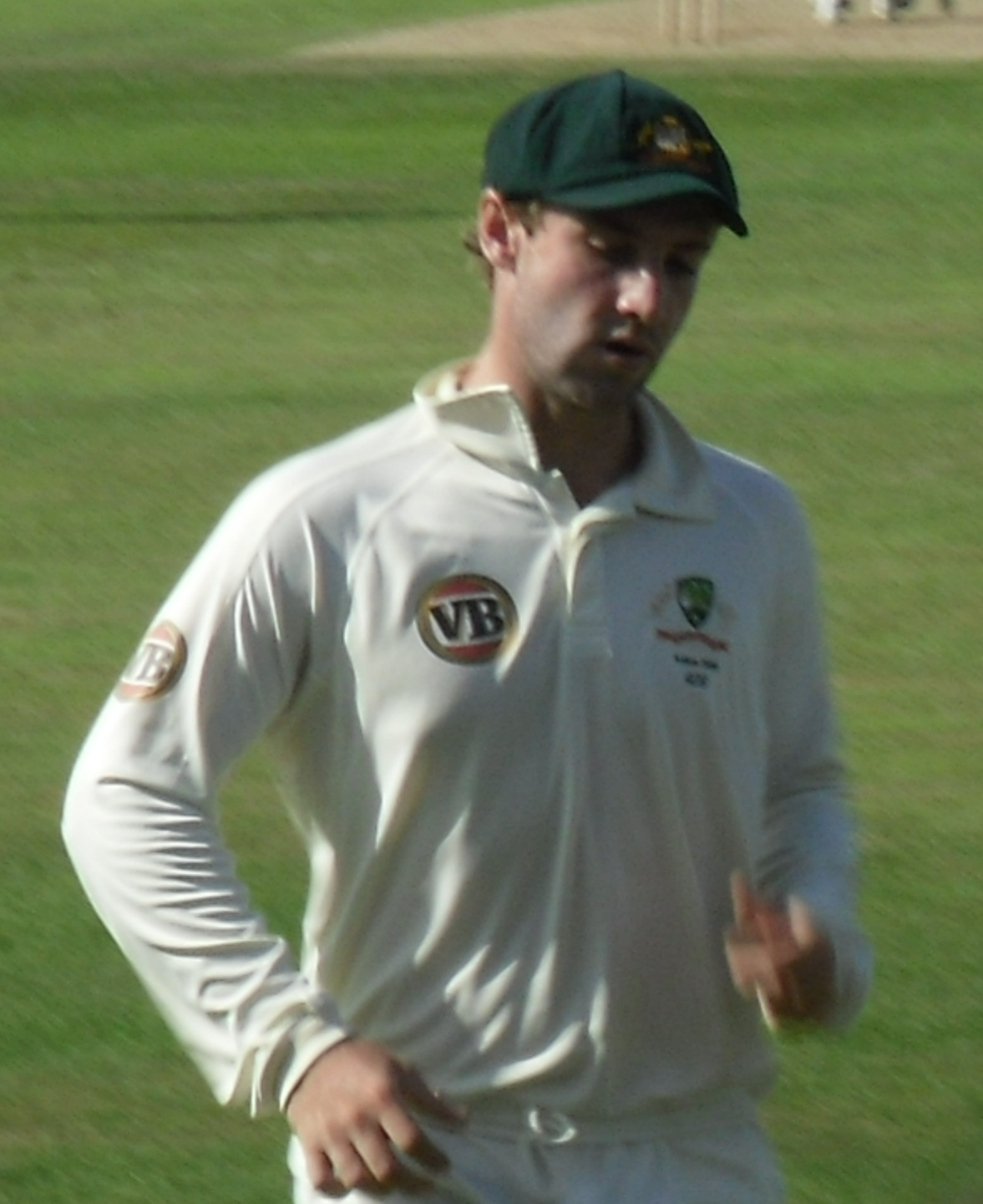
Hughes at Northampton in July 2009

During the 2009 Ashes campaign, Hughes's unorthodox technique was exploited by fast bowlers, who targeted his upper body and avoided bowling wide outside off stump, restricting his opportunities to play shots through the offside, most notably the cut shot. He was dropped from the team for the third Edgbaston Test in favour of Shane Watson, who opened the batting in his place and provided the Australians with an extra bowling option. Upon his return from South Africa, the Phillip Hughes Award, to be given annually to a promising young cricketer from the local district, was announced in his home town of Macksville. He was awarded the Bradman Young Cricketer of the Year at the Allan Border Medal ceremony by the CA in 2009.

Hughes was a fringe player for the next year or so, playing some Tests to cover for other injured batsmen. He played two home Tests against Pakistan in this capacity, covering for the injured Ricky Ponting in the Boxing Day Test, then Simon Katich in the New Year's Test. He was then called up to the Test squad for the tour of New Zealand in March 2010 to replace Shane Watson in the first Test; he scored a rapid 86 from 75 balls in a small fourth-innings run chase in this Test.

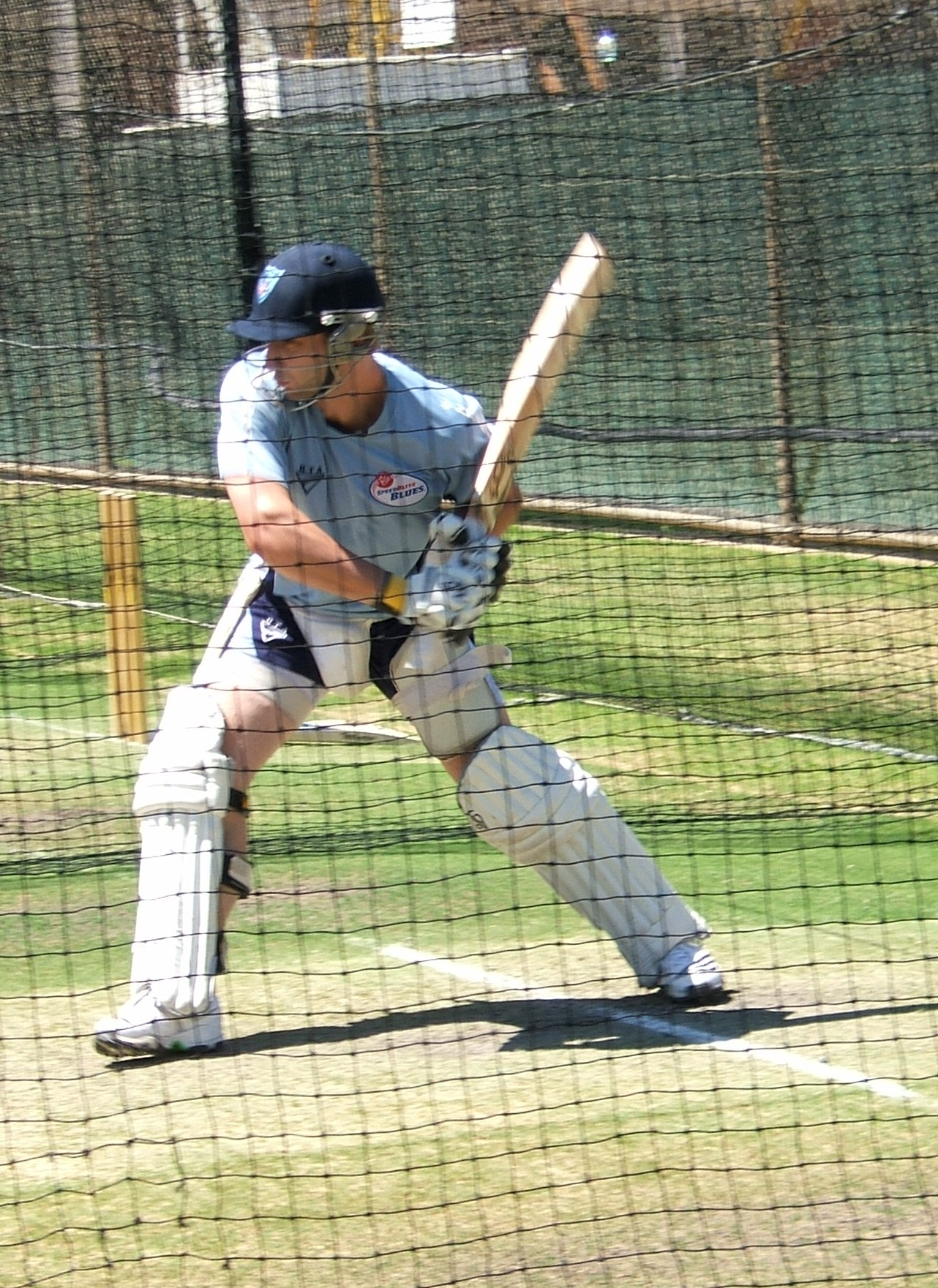
Hughes in the nets

Hughes was dropped from the 2010–11 Ashes squad, but was called up for the Third Test as a replacement for the injured Simon Katich. He was a regular in the Australian team for the following year, playing in the last three Ashes tests, tours of Sri Lanka and South Africa and then a home series against New Zealand, but his spot came under pressure due to his inconsistency during that time. He achieved two big scores (126 in Colombo and 88 in Johannesburg), but his next-highest score was only 36, and he consistently fell to catches at slip and gully. He was heavily criticised for his performance in the two-Test series against New Zealand, in which he managed only 41 runs at 10.25, and was dismissed exactly the same way in all four innings: caught at slip by Martin Guptill from the bowling of Chris Martin. He was dropped from the Australian team following the series.

In a stint for Worcestershire in the English County Cricket competition, Hughes made adjustments to his much maligned technique resulting in a more expansive range of strokes with more emphasis on legside play. Upon return to Australia, Hughes left his home state of New South Wales, moving to South Australia. This resulted in a strong return of runs in first-class cricket in the Sheffield Shield and one day cricket in the Ryobi Cup. These returns earned Hughes a recall to the Australian Test team to face Sri Lanka in Hobart following the retirement of Ricky Ponting in December 2012. He made an impressive first inning 86 batting at number 3.

After almost a year away from the Test arena, Hughes found himself back in the Test team for the series against Sri Lanka in lieu of the retiring Ricky Ponting, occupying the number 3 position over Watson. Immediately he made an impact, scoring a solid 86 in the first Test match at Hobart, with a new-found confidence and tighter technique that had eluded him 12 months prior. He made two half centuries during his comeback scoring 233 runs at 46.60 in what was the most successful stint at the number 3 spot that the Australians had seen for some time. Hughes was set to receive a $1 million contract with Cricket Australia and be selected in Australia's ODI and T20 international squads in the wake of Michael Hussey's international retirement at the end of the 2012/13 Australia summer. Hughes's selection in the Australian ODI squad was confirmed on 6 January 2013. National selection boss John Inverarity noted that players such as Hughes were included with an eye to the 2015 World Cup, suggesting that he was viewed as a long-term player for Australia in all three forms of the game.

Hughes made his mark with a solid 112 (from 129 balls) in his ODI debut, becoming the first Australian to reach a century on debut. He opened the innings with Aaron Finch at Melbourne, and he added a 140-run third-wicket partnership with captain George Bailey before being dismissed by Lasith Malinga. Hughes scored his second match-winning ODI century with 138 (n.o.) off 154 balls in the fifth ODI of the same series.

Following his successful summer season in Australia in 2012/2013, Hughes was selected to play in the Test series in India, but he struggled, scoring 147 runs in eight innings and averaging only 18.37. He played the first two Tests of the 2013 Ashes, and shared a world record tenth wicket partnership of 163 runs with debutant Ashton Agar in the first innings at Trent Bridge, but was dropped for the third test. Hughes did not play another Test for Australia, but he played in an ODI series in India in October 2013, in Zimbabwe (against both Zimbabwe and South Africa) in September 2014, and against Pakistan in the United Arab Emirates in October 2014. Hughes made his first and only Twenty20 International appearance for Australia against Pakistan in the United Arab Emirates on 5 October 2014.

== Awards ==
- New South Wales Rising Star Award: 2008
- Bradman Young Cricketer of the Year: 2009
- Sheffield Shield Player of the Year: 2008/09
- Domestic Player of the Year: 2012/13

== Personal life ==
A year before his death, Hughes bought a 90-hectare (220-acre) property in Macksville, with 70 Angus cattle.

He was a close friend of teammates Michael Clarke and David Warner, as well as boxer Anthony Mundine. He grew up with fellow Macksville local and former rugby league footballer Greg Inglis.

== Death ==
During a session of the Sheffield Shield match between South Australia and New South Wales at the Sydney Cricket Ground on 25 November 2014, Hughes, batting on 63 runs, was struck in the neck by the ball after missing an attempted hook shot to a bouncer from New South Wales bowler Sean Abbott. Hughes was wearing a helmet, but the ball struck an unprotected area just below his left ear. He collapsed before receiving mouth-to-mouth resuscitation and was subsequently taken to St Vincent's Hospital, Sydney, where he underwent surgery and was placed into an induced coma. Hughes's injury was a rare but described type of sport-related blunt-force cerebrovascular injury called a vertebral artery dissection, which led to subarachnoid haemorrhage.

The match was immediately abandoned. The other two Shield games that were being played elsewhere in Australia—Brisbane and Melbourne—were abandoned at the end of the day, with Cricket Australia stating that "Given how players across the country are feeling right now, it's just not the day to be playing cricket."

In the early morning hours of 27 November 2014, Hughes died from the injuries that he had sustained two days prior. Australian cricket captain Michael Clarke read a statement on behalf of Hughes's family.

In May 2015, Cricket Australia announced that an independent review would be undertaken into Hughes's death.

As a result of Hughes's death, calls were made for improvements to the cricket helmet, which resulted in new designs with additional guards fitted to the rear of the helmet. However, an independent review released by Cricket Australia stated that, "The now mandated British Standard helmet would have offered no protection where he was struck. There is limited scientific evidence that current neck guards will prevent a similar tragedy and they must be properly evaluated before they are mandated." After the review was completed in 2016, it was concluded that the incident was purely accidental, and any changes made to improve safety during the review period, such as mandatory helmets for wicketkeepers, close-in fielders, and batsmen facing fast or medium pace bowling (even during net sessions), would not have prevented the accident. Defibrillators also became mandatory at all grounds for all Cricket Australia-sanctioned matches.

=== Inquest ===
A coronial inquest into Hughes's death began on 10 October 2016. The final result of the investigation was that the death of Hughes was a tragic accident arising from a minuscule misjudgement from the batsman and that no players or umpires were at fault.

=== Tributes ===
Many tributes were paid to Hughes within and outside the world of cricket, particularly over the rest of the 2014–15 summer season. Play on the second day of the third Test between Pakistan and New Zealand in the United Arab Emirates was suspended due to its scheduled start occurring not long after Hughes's death. The match was extended by an extra day. The second ODI between Sri Lanka and England, played on 29 November, went ahead with the teams paying tribute to Hughes. People from around the world posted photos of their bats on social media to pay tribute to Hughes.

Closing section of Michael Clarke's tribute

Phillip’s spirit, which is now part of our game forever, will act as a custodian of the sport we all love.

We must listen to it. We must cherish it. We must learn from it. We must dig in and get through to tea. And we must play on.

So rest in peace my little brother. I'll see you out in the middle.

— Michael Clarke, transcribed in The Guardian

Hughes's funeral was held on 3 December 2014 at Macksville High School, in a Catholic ceremony. The eulogy was given by Hughes's cousin Nino Ramunno, with speeches also given by Hughes's siblings Jason and Megan; Australia's cricket captain at the time, Michael Clarke; and the Cricket Australia chief executive at the time, James Sutherland. Clarke, Aaron Finch and Tom Cooper were among the pallbearers. The service was attended by around one thousand people, including many national and sporting dignitaries as well as the then Australian Prime Minister Tony Abbott. Thousands of people followed the service at venues in Macksville and around the country. Representatives from the Indian team touring the country also attended.

The first two Border–Gavaskar Trophy Tests between Australia and India, to have been held in early December, were rescheduled to provide an additional five days of mourning. Hughes was named and listed as "the 13th man" for the first Test, and his Test cap number 408 was sewn under the badge of all Australian players and painted on the field, and there were 63 seconds of applause before the start of the match. During the first Test, David Warner and Steve Smith both raised their bats in commemoration of Phillip Hughes when they passed 63 not out, and when Australia reached 408 runs, the match temporarily stopped as the crowd recognised the occasion. When Warner passed 63 in the fourth Test at the SCG, he kissed the ground near to the place where Hughes was fatally injured. Clarke continued to wear a black armband with Hughes's initials on it through to the final of the 2015 Cricket World Cup and dedicated their victory at the MCG over co-host New Zealand to Hughes after Australia reclaimed the World Cup.

Hughes's One-Day International shirt number, 64, was retired in his memory. The scorecard of Hughes's final innings was formally amended to show him being 63 not out, instead of retired hurt. A 63-over tribute match (31 1/2 overs per side) featuring some Australians was played in Nepal on 11 April 2015. During the men's trials for the 2015 Boat Race contested by Oxford and Cambridge, the senior men's trial boats for the Cambridge team were called 63 and Not Out in honour of Hughes.

Sydney rapper Urthboy released "Nambucca Boy" as a tribute to Hughes. Matthew Wade also has a likeness of Hughes tattooed on his right forearm.

In the first home Ashes series since Hughes's passing, Australia decided to extend play to the fifth day on the first Ashes Test in 2017, which coincided with the third anniversary of his passing, with David Warner looking skyward as he scored past 63*; the Barmy Army sang a light-hearted parody as a tribute to Hughes to the tune of "Winter Wonderland". Australia won the first Test at The Gabba, Brisbane, by 10 wickets.

A road bridge on the Pacific Highway over the Nambucca River near his rural NSW hometown of Macksville has been named after Hughes.

== See also ==
- List of unusual deaths in the 21st century
- Ray Chapman, an American baseball player killed after being struck by a ball during a game; he was the only player in Major League Baseball history to die of an in-game injury
- List of fatalities while playing cricket
