= Department of Health, Housing, Local Government and Community Services =

Australian government department, 1993

Department overview
- Formed: 24 March 1993
- Preceding Department: Department of Immigration, Local Government and Ethnic Affairs – for local government functions; Department of Health, Housing and Community Services
- Dissolved: 23 December 1993
- Superseding Department: Department of Human Services and Health
- Jurisdiction: Commonwealth of Australia
- Headquarters: Phillip, Canberra
- Ministers responsible: Graham Richardson; Brian Howe
- Department executive: Tony Cole, Secretary

The Department of Health, Housing, Local Government and Community Services was an Australian government department that existed between March and December 1993.

The Department was created when the local government functions of the Department of Immigration, Local Government and Ethnic Affairs joined with the Department of Health, Housing and Community Services.

== Scope ==
Information about the department's functions and government funding allocation could be found in the Administrative Arrangements Orders, the annual Portfolio Budget Statements and in the Department's annual reports.

According to the Administrative Arrangements Order made on 24 March 1993, the Department dealt with:

- Services for the aged, people with disabilities and families with children
- Community support services
- Housing
- Public health and medical research
- Health promotion and disease prevention
- Pharmaceutical benefits
- Health benefits schemes
- Specific health services, including human quarantine
- National drug abuse strategy
- Matters relating to local government

== Structure ==
The Department was an Australian Public Service department, staffed by officials who were responsible to the Minister. The Ministers were Graham Richardson and Brian Howe.

The Secretary of the Department was Anthony Stuart Cole.
