= Tony Cole =

Australian public servant (1947–2025)

Tony Cole AO

Secretary of the Department of Human Services and Health
- In office 23 December 1993 – 1 July 1994

Secretary of the Department of Health, Housing, Local Government and Community Services
- In office 24 March 1993 – 23 December 1993

Secretary of the Department of the Treasury
- In office 14 February 1991 – 24 March 1993

Personal details
- Born: Anthony Stuart Cole; 17 March 1947 Macksville, New South Wales, Australia
- Died: 8 November 2025 (aged 78)
- Education: University of Sydney
- Occupation: Public servant

Anthony Stuart Cole AO (17 March 1947 – 8 November 2025) was an Australian public servant. He served the Commonwealth in various capacities for over 25 years.

== Background ==
Cole was born in Macksville, New South Wales on 17 March 1947. He attended Macksville High School. He died on 8 November 2025, at the age of 78.

== Career ==
In 1968, Cole graduated with a Bachelor of Economics degree from the University of Sydney and joined the Department of the Treasury.

From 1979, Cole spent two years as a senior World Bank official, saying these years were crucial in developing his views on economic policy. Shortly after in 1983 Cole was appointed principal private secretary to Treasurer Paul Keating, working in the role until October 1985.

He was appointed the thirteenth Secretary of the Department of the Treasury in 1991, remaining in the role until 1993 when he transferred to another role as Secretary of the Department of Health, Housing, Local Government and Community Services (later Department of Human Services and Health). There was speculation at the time that Cole was removed as Treasury Secretary due to evidence he gave to a Senate inquiry into Victoria's debt blowout, the Treasurer, John Dawkins, denied the suggestion, stating that his move was just a normal part of the re-establishment of administration following an election.

Cole left the public service in 1994, aged 47. When he left, John Taylor, the Commonwealth Auditor-General at the time, told media "it's a tragedy that somebody of the standing and even future potential of Tony Cole should be lost to public service".

After leaving the public sector, Cole was a Senior Investment Consultant and Executive in Mercer's investment consulting business for 17 years, including heading the business in the Asia Pacific region for more than five years. He served as Non-Executive Director for Commonwealth Superannuation Corporation and Australian Ethical Investments, and was a member of the Expert Panel for the Fair Work Commission's Annual wage review.

In 2013 and 2014, he was a member of the Abbott government's National Commission of Audit, which was established to improve the Australian government's budget.

== Awards ==
In 1995, Cole was honoured as an Officer of the Order of Australia, in recognition of service to the development of public sector policy.

Government offices
Preceded by Himself as Secretary of the Department of Health, Housing, Local Government and Community Services	Secretary of the Department of Human Services and Health; 1993–1994	Succeeded by Stephen Duckett
Preceded by Chris Conybeare as Secretary of the Department of Immigration, Local Government and Ethnic Affairs	Secretary of the Department of Health, Housing, Local Government and Community Services; 1993	Succeeded by Himself as Secretary of the Department of Human Services and Health
Preceded by Stuart Hamilton as Secretary of the Department of Health, Housing and Community Services	Secretary of the Department of Health, Housing, Local Government and Community Services; 1993	Succeeded by Himself as Secretary of the Department of Human Services and Health
Preceded by Chris Higgins	Secretary of the Department of the Treasury; 1991–1993	Succeeded by Ted Evans
