= Department of Administrative Services (1994–1997) =

Australian government department, 1994–1997

Department overview
- Formed: 30 January 1994
- Preceding Department: Department of the Arts and Administrative Services
- Dissolved: 9 October 1997
- Superseding Department: Department of Finance and Administration
- Jurisdiction: Commonwealth of Australia
- Headquarters: Belconnen, Canberra
- Ministers responsible: Bob McMullan, Minister (1994); Frank Walker, Minister (1994–1996); David Jull, Minister (1996–1997); Philip Ruddock, Minister (1997)
- Department executives: Andrew Podger, Secretary (1994); John Mellors, Secretary (1994–1997)
- Website: das.gov.au

The Department of Administrative Services was an Australian government department that existed between January 1994 and October 1997. It was the fourth so-named Commonwealth department.

== Scope ==
Information about the department's functions and government funding allocation could be found in the Administrative Arrangements Orders, the annual Portfolio Budget Statements and in the Department's annual reports.

At the department's creation, it dealt with:

- Acquisition, leasing, management and disposal of land and property in Australia and overseas
- Transport and storage services
- Co-ordination of purchasing policy and civil purchasing
- Disposal of goods
- Analytical laboratory services
- Ionospheric prediction
- Valuation services
- Geodesy, mapping and surveying services
- Planning, execution and maintenance of Commonwealth Government works
- Design and maintenance of Government furniture, furnishings and fittings Government printing and publishing services
- Electoral matters
- Australian honours and symbols policy
- Provision of facilities for members of Parliament other than in Parliament House
- Administrative support for Royal Commissions and certain other inquiries
- Information co-ordination and services within Australia, including advertising

== Structure ==
The Department was an Australian Public Service department, staffed by officials who were responsible to the Minister for Administrative Services.
