= Mark Bonser =

Senior Royal Australian Navy officer

- Born: 7 August 1952 (age 74); Sydney, New South Wales
- Military career
- Allegiance: Australia
- Branch: Royal Australian Navy
- Service years: 1971–2008
- Rank: Rear Admiral
- Commands: Australian Defence College (2004–06); Commander Australian Theatre (2002–04); Northern Command (1999–01); HMAS Anzac (1997–99); HMAS Sydney (1992–93); HMAS Aware (1979–82)
- Conflicts: Vietnam War; Gulf War; Iraq War
- Awards: Officer of the Order of Australia; Conspicuous Service Cross; Commendation for Distinguished Service

Rear Admiral Marcus Frederick Bonser, AO, CSC (born 7 August 1952) is a retired flag rank officer of the Royal Australian Navy. His final posting was as Head of the Military Justice Implementation Team for the Australian Defence Force.

== Early life ==
Mark Bonser was born in Sydney on 7 August 1952. He attended high school at Manly Boys High School and Macksville High School.

== Naval career ==
In 1971, Bonser joined the Royal Australian Navy (RAN) and commenced training at the Royal Australian Naval College. He graduated from the college in 1973, then undertook six weeks training with the Royal Navy, before joining the ship's company of the aircraft carrier HMAS Melbourne. Bonser completed his bridge watchkeeping certification aboard the carrier. Over the following years, he served aboard HMA Ships Advance, Duchess, Jervis Bay, and Diamantina. From 1980 until 1982, Bonser served as the commanding officer of the patrol boat HMAS Aware.

In 1982, after a short period aboard Tobruk, Bonser was sent to the United Kingdom for Principal Warfare Officer training. After qualifying as an Anti-Submarine Warfare Officer in 1983, Bonser served on exchange to the Royal Navy until 1985 as an officer aboard the destroyers HMS Antrim, then HMS Glamorgan. On his return to Australia, Bosner was first posted to the destroyer HMAS Perth, then to HMAS Torrens as the destroyer escort's executive officer. While aboard Torrens, he was promoted to the rank of commander. In 1988, Bonser was assigned to Maritime Headquarters Sydney in the positions of Fleet Programming Officer and Commander Operations.

In 1990, Bonser was attached to the ship's company of HMAS Brisbane as the Chief Staff Officer to the RAN Task Group Commander during the ship's deployment to the Gulf War. He was awarded the Commendation for Distinguished Service for his actions during the deployment. After returning from the Persian Gulf in 1991, Bonser attended the Joint Services Staff College.

From April 1992 until 1993, Bonser was the commanding officer of the frigate HMAS Sydney. During this period, Sydney was deployed to the Red Sea in support of United Nations sanctions against Iraq. During 1994, Bonser was awarded the Conspicuous Service Cross for this deployment, and in December, he was promoted to captain. After promotion, Bonser was posted to Maritime Headquarters again; initially as Chief Staff Officer Operations, then serving as the Chief Staff Officer C3I. In January 1996, he transferred to the Australian Defence Force Headquarters as the Director Combat Force Development (Sea).

From October 1997 to mid-1999, Bonser was the commanding officer of the frigate HMAS Anzac. In July 1999, Bonser was promoted to commodore and assigned as Commander Northern Command. At the start of 2001, Bonser became the Director General Command and Support Systems in the Defence Materiel Organisation. Bonser was promoted to rear admiral in July 2001, and assigned as Director General of Coastwatch. In June 2002, he was appointed Commander Australian Theatre. In 2003, Bonser was made an Officer of the Order of Australia for his leadership during the invasion of Iraq.

From May 2004 to January 2006, Bonser was the Commander Australian Defence College. During this period, he was appointed on 7 October 2005 as head of the Military Justice Response Coordination Team, then later that year as head of the Military Justice Implementation Team.

Military offices
Preceded by Major General Jim Molan	Commander Australian Defence College; 2004–2006	Succeeded by Major General David Morrison
Preceded by Rear Admiral Chris Ritchie	Commander Australian Theatre; 2002–2004	Succeeded by Vice Admiral Russ Shalders as Chief of Joint Operations
