= Department of Human Services and Health =

Australian government department, 1993–1996

Department overview
- Formed: 23 December 1993
- Preceding Department: Department of Health, Housing, Local Government and Community Services
- Dissolved: 11 March 1996
- Superseding Department: Department of Housing and Regional Development – for housing and local government in 1994; Department of Health and Family Services – for remaining functions in 1996
- Jurisdiction: Commonwealth of Australia
- Headquarters: Phillip, Canberra
- Ministers responsible: Carmen Lawrence; Minister
- Department executives: Tony Cole, Secretary (1993–1994); Stephen Duckett, Secretary (1994–1996)

The Department of Human Services and Health was an Australian government department that had existed between December 1993 and March 1996.

The Department was created when the Department of Health, Housing, Local Government and Community Services changed its name.

== Scope ==
Information about the department's functions and government funding allocation could be found in the Administrative Arrangements Orders, the annual Portfolio Budget Statements and in the Department's annual reports.

According to the Administrative Arrangements Order made on 15 December 1993, the Department dealt with:

- Services for the aged, people with disabilities and families with children
- Community support services
- Housing
- Public health and medical research
- Health promotion and disease prevention
- Pharmaceutical benefits
- Health benefits schemes
- Specific health services, including human quarantine
- National drug abuse strategy
- Matters relating to local government

== Structure ==
The Department was an Australian Public Service department, staffed by officials who were responsible to the Minister.

The Secretary of the Department was Anthony Stuart Cole (until July 1994) and then Stephen Duckett.
