= Department of Housing and Regional Development =

Former Australian government department (1994–1996)

Department overview
- Formed: 25 March 1994
- Preceding Department: Department of Industry, Technology and Regional Development – for the regional development function Department of Human Services and Health – for the housing and local government functions
- Dissolved: 11 March 1996
- Superseding Department: Department of Transport and Regional Development – for the regional development function Department of Industry, Science and Tourism – for industry aspects of the housing function Department of Social Security – for the Housing and Special Payments Division
- Jurisdiction: Commonwealth of Australia
- Headquarters: Canberra
- Minister responsible: Brian Howe
- Department executive: Andrew Podger, Secretary

The Department of Housing and Regional Development was an Australian government department that existed between March 1994 and March 1996.

== History ==
The department was created by the Keating government on 25 March 1994, dividing the Department of Human Services and Health. At the time, media noted that the department was similar to the Whitlam-era Department of Urban and Regional Development, with the key difference being that all funds were to be paid through states and local governments rather than through Australian Government programs.

After the Howard government was elected at the 1996 federal election, Prime Minister John Howard dismantled the department, assigning its welfare housing functions to the Department of Social Security and its industry functions to the newly created Department of Industry, Science and Tourism.

== Scope ==
Information about the department's functions and government funding allocation could be found in the Administrative Arrangements Orders, the annual Portfolio Budget Statements and in the Department's annual reports.

According to the Administrative Arrangements Order made on 25 March 1994, the Department dealt with:

- Housing
- Matters relating to local government
- Planning and land management in the Australian Capital Territory
- Regional development

== Structure ==
The Department was administered by Australian public servants who were responsible to the Minister for Housing and Regional Development, Brian Howe.

The Secretary of the Department was Andrew Podger.
