= Electoral results for the Division of Calare =

Australian division election results

This is a list of electoral results for the Division of Calare in Australian federal elections from the division's creation in 1906 until the present.

== Members ==
Member	Party	Term
Thomas Brown	Labour	1906–1913
Henry Pigott	Liberal	1913–1916
Henry Pigott	Nationalist	1916–1919
Thomas Lavelle	Labor	1919–1922
Sir Neville Howse	Nationalist	1922–1929
George Gibbons	Labor	1929–1931
Harold Thorby	Country	1931–1940
John Breen	Labor	1940–1946
John Howse	Liberal	1946–1960
John England	Country	1960–1975
Sandy Mackenzie	National	1975–1983
David Simmons	Labor	1983–1996
Peter Andren	Independent	1996–2007
John Cobb	National	2007–2016
Andrew Gee	National	2016–2022
Andrew Gee	Independent	2022–present

== Election results ==
=== Elections in the 2020s ===
==== 2025 ====
2025 Australian federal election: Calare
Party	Candidate	Votes	%	±%
National	Sam Farraway	31,577	29.71	−17.96
Independent	Andrew Gee	25,172	23.69	+23.69
Independent	Kate Hook	16,756	15.77	−4.63
Labor	Julie Cunningham	11,086	10.43	−4.71
One Nation	Jennifer Hughes	8,200	7.72	−0.72
Legalise Cannabis	Sue Raye	4,162	3.92	+3.92
Greens	Ben Parker	3,753	3.53	−1.03
Shooters, Fishers, Farmers	Jase Lesage	2,245	2.11	+2.11
Family First	Ross Hazelton	1,733	1.63	+1.63
Trumpet of Patriots	Vicki O'Leary	1,583	1.49	+1.49
Total formal votes		106,267	91.98	−4.03
Informal votes		9,271	8.02	+4.03
Turnout		115,538	92.68	+2.65
Notional two-party-preferred count
National	Sam Farraway	66,158	62.26	−3.19
Labor	Julie Cunningham	40,109	37.74	+3.19
Two-candidate-preferred result
Independent	Andrew Gee	60,338	56.78	+56.78
National	Sam Farraway	45,929	43.22	−16.46
Member changed to Independent from National				

==== 2022 ====
2022 Australian federal election: Calare
Party	Candidate	Votes	%	±%
National	Andrew Gee	51,161	47.67	+2.96
Independent	Kate Hook	21,891	20.40	+20.40
Labor	Sarah Elliott	16,252	15.14	−6.99
One Nation	Stacey Whittaker	9,057	8.44	+8.44
Greens	Kay Nankervis	4,891	4.56	−1.50
United Australia	Adam Jannis	4,067	3.79	+0.56
Total formal votes		107,319	96.01	+1.67
Informal votes		4,455	3.99	−1.67
Turnout		111,774	92.06	−1.54
Notional two-party-preferred count
National	Andrew Gee	70,245	65.45	+2.16
Labor	Sarah Elliott	37,074	34.55	−2.16
Two-candidate-preferred result
National	Andrew Gee	64,047	59.68	−3.61
Independent	Kate Hook	43,272	40.32	+40.32
National hold				

Alluvial diagram for preference flows in the seat of Calare in the 2022 federal election. indicates at what stage the winning candidate had over 50% of the votes and was declared the winner.

=== Elections in the 2010s ===
==== 2019 ====
2019 Australian federal election: Calare
Party	Candidate	Votes	%	±%
National	Andrew Gee	46,632	44.71	−2.87
Labor	Jess Jennings	23,074	22.13	−4.93
Shooters, Fishers, Farmers	Sam Romano	18,129	17.38	+17.38
Greens	Stephanie Luke	6,315	6.06	−1.16
Liberal Democrats	Stephen Bisgrove	4,775	4.58	−1.96
United Australia	Beverley Cameron	3,371	3.23	+3.23
Christian Democrats	Shuyi Chen	1,992	1.91	−0.47
Total formal votes		104,288	94.35	−0.47
Informal votes		6,251	5.66	+0.47
Turnout		110,539	93.60	−0.04
Two-party-preferred result
National	Andrew Gee	66,006	63.29	+1.48
Labor	Jess Jennings	38,282	36.71	−1.48
National hold		Swing	+1.48	

==== 2016 ====
2016 Australian federal election: Calare
Party	Candidate	Votes	%	±%
National	Andrew Gee	47,717	47.58	−9.03
Labor	Jess Jennings	27,132	27.06	+0.76
Greens	Delanie Sky	7,238	7.22	+2.16
Liberal Democrats	Glen Davis	6,557	6.54	+6.54
Xenophon	Rod Bloomfield	5,412	5.40	+5.40
Independent	Anthony Craig	3,836	3.83	+3.83
Christian Democrats	Bernie Gesling	2,386	2.38	+0.52
Total formal votes		100,278	94.81	+0.94
Informal votes		5,490	5.19	−0.94
Turnout		105,768	93.64	−1.76
Two-party-preferred result
National	Andrew Gee	61,978	61.81	−3.16
Labor	Jess Jennings	38,300	38.19	+3.16
National hold		Swing	−3.16	

==== 2013 ====
2013 Australian federal election: Calare
Party	Candidate	Votes	%	±%
National	John Cobb	52,650	57.65	+5.24
Labor	Jess Jennings	23,185	25.39	−3.66
Palmer United	Brian Cain	4,356	4.77	+4.77
Greens	David Mallard	4,054	4.44	−1.56
Independent	Macgregor Ross	2,388	2.61	+0.57
Christian Democrats	Ian Lyons	1,628	1.78	−0.41
Katter's Australian	Billie Kirkland	1,293	1.42	+1.42
Australia First	Peter Schultze	1,010	1.11	+1.11
Democratic Labour	Anthony Craig	759	0.83	+0.83
Total formal votes		91,323	93.89	−1.18
Informal votes		5,942	6.11	+1.18
Turnout		97,265	95.32	−0.02
Two-party-preferred result
National	John Cobb	60,248	65.97	+5.23
Labor	Jess Jennings	31,075	34.03	−5.23
National hold		Swing	+5.23	

==== 2010 ====
2010 Australian federal election: Calare
Party	Candidate	Votes	%	±%
National	John Cobb	46,775	52.41	+25.91
Labor	Kevin Duffy	25,926	29.05	−4.42
Greens	Jeremy Buckingham	5,354	6.00	+1.82
Independent	Paul Blanch	4,137	4.64	+4.64
Independent	Karen Romano	3,276	3.67	+3.67
Christian Democrats	Jessyka Norsworthy	1,957	2.19	+1.65
Independent	Macgregor Ross	1,817	2.04	+2.04
Total formal votes		89,242	95.07	−1.31
Informal votes		4,631	4.93	+1.31
Turnout		93,873	95.30	−1.12
Two-party-preferred result
National	John Cobb	54,209	60.74	+7.28
Labor	Kevin Duffy	35,033	39.26	−7.28
National hold		Swing	+7.28	

=== Elections in the 2000s ===
==== 2007 ====
2007 Australian federal election: Calare
Party	Candidate	Votes	%	±%
National	John Cobb	39,941	48.48	+10.06
Labor	Michael Allen	20,266	24.60	+4.76
Independent	Gavin Priestley	19,035	23.10	+23.10
Greens	Jeremy Buckingham	2,351	2.85	+0.17
Citizens Electoral Council	David John Simpson	794	0.96	+0.13
Total formal votes		82,387	96.56	+0.19
Informal votes		2,933	3.44	−0.19
Turnout		85,320	95.78	−0.80
Two-party-preferred result
National	John Cobb	51,124	62.05	+0.64
Labor	Michael Allen	31,263	37.95	−0.64
National notional hold		Swing	+0.64	

The sitting member was Peter Andren (Independent) however a redistribution effectively cut Calare in half and Andren did not contest the election.

==== 2004 ====
2004 Australian federal election: Calare
Party	Candidate	Votes	%	±%
Independent	Peter Andren	40,851	50.23	−1.17
Labor	Robyn Adams	13,439	16.52	−4.04
Liberal	Paul Blanch	13,087	16.09	+16.09
National	Robert Griffith	10,482	12.89	−7.64
Greens	Stephen Nugent	1,868	2.30	+0.77
Family First	Melanie Woods	959	1.18	+1.18
Citizens Electoral Council	Heidi van Schaik	648	0.80	+0.41
Total formal votes		81,334	96.47	−0.25
Informal votes		2,980	3.53	+0.25
Turnout		84,314	95.67	−0.51
Notional two-party-preferred count
Liberal	Paul Blanch	41,562	51.1	−0.63
Labor	Robyn Adams	39,772	48.9	+0.63
Two-candidate-preferred result
Independent	Peter Andren	57,939	71.24	−3.80
Liberal	Paul Blanch	23,395	28.76	+28.76
Independent hold		Swing	−3.80	

==== 2001 ====
2001 Australian federal election: Calare
Party	Candidate	Votes	%	±%
Independent	Peter Andren	40,786	51.40	+15.12
Labor	Kath Knowles	16,314	20.56	−4.00
National	Dave Shearing	16,289	20.53	+8.58
One Nation	Terry Nixon	3,249	4.09	−6.95
Greens	Ian Watts	1,217	1.53	+0.43
Democrats	Don Marshall	1,191	1.50	+0.51
Citizens Electoral Council	David Simpson	311	0.39	+0.17
Total formal votes		79,357	96.72	+0.24
Informal votes		2,690	3.28	−0.24
Turnout		82,047	96.99	
Notional two-party-preferred count
National	Dave Shearing	41,055	51.73	−2.74
Labor	Kath Knowles	38,302	48.27	+2.74
Two-candidate-preferred result
Independent	Peter Andren	59,548	75.04	+2.73
National	Dave Shearing	19,809	24.96	+24.96
Independent hold		Swing	+2.73	

=== Elections in the 1990s ===
==== 1998 ====
1998 Australian federal election: Calare
Party	Candidate	Votes	%	±%
Independent	Peter Andren	29,522	40.55	+11.18
Labor	Terence Corkin	17,425	23.93	−5.03
National	Rod Blume	8,554	11.75	−9.04
One Nation	Martin Gleeson	7,954	10.92	+10.92
Liberal	Garry Sloan	7,640	10.49	−5.24
Greens	Joan Lambert	676	0.93	−0.85
Democrats	Ben Saul	581	0.80	−0.36
Unity	Nelle Edwards	290	0.40	+0.40
Citizens Electoral Council	David Simpson	168	0.23	+0.23
Total formal votes		72,812	96.62	−1.15
Informal votes		2,548	3.38	+1.15
Turnout		75,360	96.20	−0.62
Notional two-party-preferred count
National	Rod Blume	38,744	53.21	+0.31
Labor	Terence Corkin	34,068	46.79	−0.31
Two-candidate-preferred result
Independent	Peter Andren	52,653	72.31	+8.99
Labor	Terence Corkin	20,159	27.69	
Independent hold		Swing	+8.99	

==== 1996 ====
1996 Australian federal election: Calare
Party	Candidate	Votes	%	±%
Independent	Peter Andren	21,708	29.37	+29.37
Labor	Rob Allen	21,407	28.96	−22.04
National	Trevor Toole	15,371	20.79	−5.22
Liberal	Ray Fardell	11,631	15.73	−2.79
Call to Australia	Bruce McLean	1,459	1.97	+1.97
Greens	Sharon Mullin	1,312	1.77	+1.77
Democrats	Peter Baker	859	1.16	+1.16
Natural Law	Richard Nolan	172	0.23	+0.23
Total formal votes		73,919	97.77	−0.40
Informal votes		1,687	2.23	+0.40
Turnout		75,606	96.82	−0.11
Notional two-party-preferred count
National	Trevor Toole	38,800	52.91	+6.97
Labor	Rob Allen	34,538	47.09	−6.97
Two-candidate-preferred result
Independent	Peter Andren	46,666	63.32	+63.32
National	Trevor Toole	27,037	36.68	−9.22
Independent gain from Labor		Swing	N/A	

==== 1993 ====
1993 Australian federal election: Calare
Party	Candidate	Votes	%	±%
Labor	David Simmons	36,830	51.00	+6.54
National	Ron Penny	18,787	26.01	−0.53
Liberal	John Staal	13,376	18.52	+0.21
Independent	Brian Davis	2,097	2.90	+2.90
Independent	Robert Cianfranco	1,130	1.56	+1.56
Total formal votes		72,220	98.17	+0.38
Informal votes		1,350	1.83	−0.38
Turnout		73,570	96.93	
Two-party-preferred result
Labor	David Simmons	39,005	54.06	+2.58
National	Ron Penny	33,142	45.94	−2.58
Labor hold		Swing	+2.58	

==== 1990 ====
1990 Australian federal election: Calare
Party	Candidate	Votes	%	±%
Labor	David Simmons	31,645	46.2	−2.7
National	Joanne Lewis	16,229	23.7	+2.8
Liberal	John Loneregan	13,387	19.5	−5.5
Democrats	Steve Adams	3,759	5.5	+1.3
Independent	Mike Phillips	1,814	2.6	+2.6
Independent EFF	Brian Davis	1,706	2.5	+2.5
Total formal votes		68,540	97.9	
Informal votes		1,487	2.1	
Turnout		70,027	96.3	
Two-party-preferred result
Labor	David Simmons	36,578	53.5	+0.2
National	Joanne Lewis	31,824	46.5	−0.2
Labor hold		Swing	+0.2	

=== Elections in the 1980s ===
==== 1987 ====
1987 Australian federal election: Calare
Party	Candidate	Votes	%	±%
Labor	David Simmons	31,988	48.9	+0.9
Liberal	Mick English	16,319	25.0	+7.6
National	Stewart Hespe	13,653	20.9	−1.1
Democrats	Bob Dolton	2,767	4.2	+0.8
Independent	Eve Buscombe	656	1.0	+1.0
Total formal votes		65,383	96.9	
Informal votes		2,074	3.1	
Turnout		67,457	96.4	
Two-party-preferred result
Labor	David Simmons	34,834	53.3	−2.3
Liberal	Mick English	30,537	46.7	+2.3
Labor hold		Swing	−2.3	

==== 1984 ====
1984 Australian federal election: Calare
Party	Candidate	Votes	%	±%
Labor	David Simmons	30,956	49.8	−1.9
National	Russ Turner	13,664	22.0	−21.8
Liberal	Ian Byrne	10,794	17.4	+17.4
Independent	Margaret Stevenson	4,596	7.4	+7.4
Democrats	Gregory Hamilton	2,101	3.4	−0.3
Total formal votes		62,111	95.4	
Informal votes		2,983	4.6	
Turnout		65,094	95.9	
Two-party-preferred result
Labor	David Simmons	34,509	55.6	+1.6
National	Russ Turner	27,588	44.4	−1.6
Labor hold		Swing	+1.6	

==== 1983 ====
1983 Australian federal election: Calare
Party	Candidate	Votes	%	±%
Labor	David Simmons	35,089	50.6	+4.3
National	Sandy Mackenzie	31,087	44.9	−5.1
Democrats	Ann Ritter	2,562	3.7	+0.0
Progress	George Simpson	566	0.8	+0.8
Total formal votes		69,304	98.8	
Informal votes		870	1.2	
Turnout		70.174	96.4	
Two-party-preferred result
Labor	David Simmons	36,761	53.0	+4.5
National	Sandy Mackenzie	32,543	47.0	−4.5
Labor gain from National		Swing	+4.5	

==== 1980 ====
1980 Australian federal election: Calare
Party	Candidate	Votes	%	±%
National Country	Sandy Mackenzie	34,234	50.0	+18.4
Labor	David Simmons	31,645	46.3	+5.8
Democrats	Ann Ritter	2,539	3.7	−3.8
Total formal votes		68,418	98.6	
Informal votes		996	1.4	
Turnout		69,414	95.7	
Two-party-preferred result
National Country	Sandy Mackenzie		51.5	−3.7
Labor	David Simmons		48.5	+3.7
National Country hold		Swing	−3.7	

=== Elections in the 1970s ===
==== 1977 ====
1977 Australian federal election: Calare
Party	Candidate	Votes	%	±%
Labor	David Simmons	26,799	40.5	−0.9
National Country	Sandy Mackenzie	20,893	31.6	−1.4
Liberal	James Ashton	13,509	20.4	−5.2
Democrats	Darvell Baird	4,986	7.5	+7.5
Total formal votes		66,187	98.4	
Informal votes		1,081	1.6	
Turnout		67,268	96.4	
Two-party-preferred result
National Country	Sandy Mackenzie	36,529	55.2	+0.5
Labor	David Simmons	29,658	44.8	−0.5
National Country hold		Swing	+0.5	

==== 1975 ====
1975 Australian federal election: Calare
Party	Candidate	Votes	%	±%
Labor	Francis Hall	18,845	36.8	−6.3
National Country	Sandy Mackenzie	18,106	35.3	−20.2
Liberal	James Ashton	14,309	27.9	+27.9
Total formal votes		51,260	98.4	
Informal votes		813	1.6	
Turnout		52,073	95.9	
Two-party-preferred result
National Country	Sandy Mackenzie	30,413	59.3	+1.5
Labor	Francis Hall	20,847	40.7	−1.5
National Country hold		Swing	+1.5	

==== 1974 ====
1974 Australian federal election: Calare
Party	Candidate	Votes	%	±%
Country	John England	27,817	55.5	+4.0
Labor	Neville Bowers	13,082	26.1	+26.1
Labor	Francis Hall	8,517	17.0	−26.2
Australia	Douglas Bray	682	1.4	+1.4
Total formal votes		50,098	98.5	
Informal votes		775	1.5	
Turnout		50,873	96.6	
Two-party-preferred result
Country	John England		57.8	+2.1
Labor	Neville Bowers		42.2	−2.1
Country hold		Swing	+2.1	

==== 1972 ====
1972 Australian federal election: Calare
Party	Candidate	Votes	%	±%
Country	John England	23,517	51.5	−1.0
Labor	Francis Hall	19,748	43.2	+1.9
Democratic Labor	John Grant	2,443	5.3	−0.9
Total formal votes		45,708	99.2	
Informal votes		388	0.8	
Turnout		46,096	96.5	
Two-party-preferred result
Country	John England		55.7	−1.8
Labor	Francis Hall		44.3	+1.8
Country hold		Swing	−1.8	

=== Elections in the 1960s ===
==== 1969 ====
1969 Australian federal election: Calare
Party	Candidate	Votes	%	±%
Country	John England	23,384	52.5	−7.6
Labor	Kerry Scott	18,381	41.3	+9.0
Democratic Labor	John Grant	2,764	6.2	−1.4
Total formal votes		44,529	98.9	
Informal votes		477	1.1	
Turnout		45,006	96.1	
Two-party-preferred result
Country	John England		57.5	−8.7
Labor	Kerry Scott		42.5	+8.7
Country hold		Swing	−8.7	

==== 1966 ====
1966 Australian federal election: Calare
Party	Candidate	Votes	%	±%
Country	John England	25,200	62.6	+8.3
Labor	William Stavert	11,985	29.8	−7.6
Democratic Labor	John Grant	3,053	7.6	−0.6
Total formal votes		40,238	97.8	
Informal votes		886	2.2	
Turnout		41,124	95.6	
Two-party-preferred result
Country	John England		68.7	+7.6
Labor	William Stavert		31.3	−7.6
Country hold		Swing	+7.6	

==== 1963 ====
1963 Australian federal election: Calare
Party	Candidate	Votes	%	±%
Country	John England	21,690	54.3	+4.3
Labor	Leroy Serisier	14,933	37.4	−4.2
Democratic Labor	George Boland	3,289	8.2	−0.1
Total formal votes		39,912	99.2	
Informal votes		311	0.8	
Turnout		40,223	95.8	
Two-party-preferred result
Country	John England		61.1	+4.2
Labor	Leroy Serisier		38.9	−4.2
Country hold		Swing	+4.2	

==== 1961 ====
1961 Australian federal election: Calare
Party	Candidate	Votes	%	±%
Country	John England	19,547	50.1	+50.1
Labor	Leroy Serisier	16,210	41.6	−0.3
Democratic Labor	George Boland	3,240	8.3	+8.3
Total formal votes		38,997	98.6	
Informal votes		551	1.4	
Turnout		39,548	96.0	
Two-party-preferred result
Country	John England		56.9	−1.2
Labor	Leroy Serisier		43.1	+1.2
Country hold		Swing	−1.2	

==== 1960 by-election ====
1960 Calare by-election
Party	Candidate	Votes	%	±%
Labor	Leroy Serisier	14,175	38.4	−3.5
Country	John England	12,039	32.6	+32.6
Liberal	Wallace Meares	8,039	21.8	−36.3
Democratic Labor	Raymond Proust	2,540	6.9	+6.9
Republican	John Phillips	113	0.3	+0.3
Total formal votes		36,906	98.8	
Informal votes		445	1.2	
Turnout		37,351	90.1	
Two-party-preferred result
Country	John England		59.1	+59.1
Labor	Leroy Serisier		40.9	−1.0
Country gain from Liberal		Swing	+59.1	

=== Elections in the 1950s ===
==== 1958 ====
1958 Australian federal election: Calare
Party	Candidate	Votes	%	±%
Liberal	John Howse	22,557	58.1	−3.1
Labor	Robert Rygate	16,296	41.9	+3.1
Total formal votes		38,853	98.2	
Informal votes		722	1.8	
Turnout		39,575	95.6	
Liberal hold		Swing	−3.1	

==== 1955 ====
1955 Australian federal election: Calare
Party	Candidate	Votes	%	±%
Liberal	John Howse	23,956	61.2	+5.9
Labor	Lionel Wood	15,189	38.8	−4.7
Total formal votes		39,145	98.0	
Informal votes		797	2.0	
Turnout		39,942	95.8	
Liberal hold		Swing	+5.3	

==== 1954 ====
1954 Australian federal election: Calare
Party	Candidate	Votes	%	±%
Liberal	John Howse	21,733	55.7	+1.3
Labor	John Breen	16,872	43.2	+3.2
Independent	Madge Roberts	447	1.1	+1.1
Total formal votes		39,052	99.3	
Informal votes		287	0.7	
Turnout		39,339	96.9	
Two-party-preferred result
Liberal	John Howse		56.3	+0.1
Labor	John Breen		43.7	−0.1
Liberal hold		Swing	+0.1	

==== 1951 ====
1951 Australian federal election: Calare
Party	Candidate	Votes	%	±%
Liberal	John Howse	20,517	54.4	−2.9
Labor	John Howell	15,141	40.1	−2.9
Independent	Archibald Gardiner	2,067	5.5	+5.5
Total formal votes		37,725	98.7	
Informal votes		497	1.3	
Turnout		38,204	96.5	
Two-party-preferred result
Liberal	John Howse		56.2	−0.8
Labor	John Howell		43.8	+0.8
Liberal hold		Swing	−0.8	

=== Elections in the 1940s ===
==== 1949 ====
1949 Australian federal election: Calare
Party	Candidate	Votes	%	±%
Liberal	John Howse	21,399	57.0	+25.1
Labor	George Gibbons	16,139	43.0	−5.3
Total formal votes		37,538	98.8	
Informal votes		472	1.2	
Turnout		38,010	97.3	
Liberal hold		Swing	+6.4	

==== 1946 ====
1946 Australian federal election: Calare
Party	Candidate	Votes	%	±%
Labor	John Breen	22,988	47.2	−7.2
Liberal	John Howse	14,270	29.3	+29.3
Country	Harold Thorby	11,189	23.0	−7.9
Independent	Madge Roberts	296	0.6	+0.6
Total formal votes		48,743	98.3	
Informal votes		840	1.7	
Turnout		49,583	94.5	
Two-party-preferred result
Liberal	John Howse	25,247	51.8	+11.7
Labor	John Breen	23,496	48.2	−11.7
Liberal gain from Labor		Swing	+11.7	

==== 1943 ====
1943 Australian federal election: Calare
Party	Candidate	Votes	%	±%
Labor	John Breen	27,071	54.4	+27.8
Country	Albert Reid	10,275	20.6	−14.0
Independent	Harold Thorby	6,270	12.6	+12.6
Country	Reg Edols	5,142	10.3	+10.3
One Parliament	Percy Phelan	1,029	2.1	+2.1
Total formal votes		49,787	97.9	
Informal votes		1,061	2.1	
Turnout		50,848	97.3	
Two-party-preferred result
Labor	John Breen		59.9	+6.5
Country	Albert Reid		40.1	−6.5
Labor hold		Swing	+6.5	

==== 1940 ====
1940 Australian federal election: Calare
Party	Candidate	Votes	%	±%
Country	Harold Thorby	17,227	36.4	−11.4
Labor	John Breen	12,589	26.6	−21.2
Labor (N-C)	John Heiss	6,592	13.9	+13.9
State Labor	Greg McGirr	5,502	11.6	+11.6
Country	Herbert Hodby	4,027	8.5	+8.5
Independent	Richard Brazier	1,435	3.0	+3.0
Total formal votes		47,372	95.9	
Informal votes		2,017	4.1	
Turnout		49,389	94.0	
Two-party-preferred result
Labor	John Breen	25,272	53.4	+5.6
Country	Harold Thorby	22,090	46.6	−5.6
Labor gain from Country		Swing	+5.6	

=== Elections in the 1930s ===
==== 1937 ====
1937 Australian federal election: Calare
Party	Candidate	Votes	%	±%
Country	Harold Thorby	26,378	52.2	+17.0
Labor	William Folster	24,114	47.8	+41.5
Total formal votes		50,492	98.2	
Informal votes		921	1.8	
Turnout		51.413	96.5	
Country hold		Swing	−1.8	

==== 1934 ====
1934 Australian federal election: Calare
Party	Candidate	Votes	%	±%
Labor (NSW)	William Keast	18,399	37.4	+12.2
Country	Harold Thorby	17,324	35.2	−20.0
United Australia	Lewis Nott	8,672	17.6	+17.6
Labor	Reginald Phillips	3,094	6.3	−13.3
Social Credit	Ethel Arthur-Smith	1,664	3.4	+3.4
Total formal votes		49,153	96.3	
Informal votes		1,891	3.7	
Turnout		51,044	95.9	
Two-party-preferred result
Country	Harold Thorby	26,521	54.0	−6.1
Labor (NSW)	William Keast	22,632	46.0	+6.1
Country hold		Swing	−6.1	

==== 1931 ====
1931 Australian federal election: Calare
Party	Candidate	Votes	%	±%
Country	Harold Thorby	22,842	55.3	+55.3
Labor (NSW)	Tom Watson	10,604	25.7	+25.7
Labor	George Gibbons	7,863	19.0	−32.6
Total formal votes		41,309	97.7	
Informal votes		963	2.3	
Turnout		42,272	95.1	
Two-party-preferred result
Country	Harold Thorby		60.1	+11.7
Labor (NSW)	Tom Watson		39.9	+39.9
Country gain from Labor		Swing	+11.7	

=== Elections in the 1920s ===
==== 1929 ====
1929 Australian federal election: Calare
Party	Candidate	Votes	%	±%
Labor	George Gibbons	20,492	51.6	+12.3
Nationalist	Sir Neville Howse	19,252	48.4	−12.3
Total formal votes		39,744	96.7	
Informal votes		1,376	3.3	
Turnout		41,120	95.8	
Labor gain from Nationalist		Swing	+12.3	

==== 1928 ====
1928 Australian federal election: Calare
Party	Candidate	Votes	%	±%
Nationalist	Sir Neville Howse	22,673	60.7	+1.6
Labor	James O'Donnell	14,664	39.3	−0.3
Total formal votes		37,337	95.9	
Informal votes		1,581	4.1	
Turnout		38,918	93.7	
Nationalist hold		Swing	+0.9	

==== 1925 ====
1925 Australian federal election: Calare
Party	Candidate	Votes	%	±%
Nationalist	Sir Neville Howse	21,645	59.1	+24.5
Labor	William Webster	14,499	39.6	−2.4
Independent	William Southwick	461	1.3	+1.3
Total formal votes		36,605	97.8	
Informal votes		830	2.2	
Turnout		37,435	91.9	
Two-party-preferred result
Nationalist	Sir Neville Howse		59.8	+4.5
Labor	William Webster		40.2	−4.5
Nationalist hold		Swing	+4.5	

==== 1922 ====
1922 Australian federal election: Calare
Party	Candidate	Votes	%	±%
Labor	Thomas Lavelle	10,263	42.0	−10.2
Nationalist	Sir Neville Howse	8,449	34.6	−11.2
Country	Henry Pigott	5,278	21.6	+21.6
Country	Selina Siggins	421	1.7	+1.7
Total formal votes		24,411	94.0	
Informal votes		1,560	6.0	
Turnout		45,971	65.1	
Two-party-preferred result
Nationalist	Sir Neville Howse	13,507	55.3	+8.5
Labor	Thomas Lavelle	10,904	44.7	−8.5
Nationalist gain from Labor		Swing	+8.5	

=== Elections in the 1910s ===
==== 1919 ====
1919 Australian federal election: Calare
Party	Candidate	Votes	%	±%
Labor	Thomas Lavelle	12,628	52.3	+4.1
Nationalist	Henry Pigott	11,526	47.7	−4.1
Total formal votes		24,154	98.6	
Informal votes		340	1.4	
Turnout		24,494	75.0	
Labor gain from Nationalist		Swing	+4.1	

==== 1917 ====
1917 Australian federal election: Calare
Party	Candidate	Votes	%	±%
Nationalist	Henry Pigott	13,222	51.8	+0.6
Labor	Thomas Lavelle	12,320	48.2	−0.6
Total formal votes		25,542	97.3	
Informal votes		717	2.7	
Turnout		26,259	80.3	
Nationalist hold		Swing	+0.6	

==== 1914 ====
1914 Australian federal election: Calare
Party	Candidate	Votes	%	±%
Liberal	Henry Pigott	12,770	51.2	−0.9
Labor	William Johnson	12,169	48.8	+0.9
Total formal votes		24,939	97.5	
Informal votes		635	2.5	
Turnout		25,574	77.9	
Liberal hold		Swing	−0.9	

==== 1913 ====
1913 Australian federal election: Calare
Party	Candidate	Votes	%	±%
Liberal	Henry Pigott	11,848	52.1	+5.9
Labor	Thomas Brown	10,911	47.9	−5.9
Total formal votes		22,759	97.1	
Informal votes		691	2.9	
Turnout		23,450	69.0	
Liberal gain from Labor		Swing	+5.9	

==== 1910 ====
1910 Australian federal election: Calare
Party	Candidate	Votes	%	±%
Labour	Thomas Brown	10,561	53.6	+2.9
Liberal	Henry Pigott	9,147	46.4	−2.9
Total formal votes		19,708	98.0	
Informal votes		394	2.0	
Turnout		20,102	67.2	
Labour hold		Swing	+2.9	

=== Elections in the 1900s ===
==== 1906 ====
1906 Australian federal election: Calare
Party	Candidate	Votes	%	±%
Labour	Thomas Brown	6,759	50.7	?
Anti-Socialist	John Fitzpatrick	6,565	49.3	?
Total formal votes		13,324	97.1	
Informal votes		393	2.9	
Turnout		13,717	51.7	
Labour hold		Swing	?	

== Sources ==
- Australian Electoral Commission. Federal Election results
- Carr, Adam. Psephos
