= 1960 Calare by-election =

A by-election was held for the Australian House of Representatives seat of Calare on 5 November 1960. This was triggered by the resignation of Liberal MP John Howse.

The by-election was won by Country Party candidate John England.

== Results ==
Calare by-election, 1960
Party	Candidate	Votes	%	±%
Labor	Leroy Serisier	14,175	38.4	−3.5
Country	John England	12,039	32.6	+32.6
Liberal	Wallace Meares	8,039	21.8	−36.3
Democratic Labor	Raymond Proust	2,540	6.9	+6.9
Republican	John Phillips	113	0.3	+0.3
Total formal votes		36,906	98.8	
Informal votes		445	1.2	
Turnout		37,351	90.1	−5.5
Two-party-preferred result
Country	John England	21,824	59.1	+59.1
Labor	Leroy Serisier	15,082	40.9	−1.0
Country gain from Liberal		Swing	+59.1	
