= Leroy Serisier =

Australian politician

Leroy Dudley Serisier (9 December 1927 – 12 May 2014) was an Australian politician. He was a Labor member of the New South Wales Legislative Council from 1970 to 1978, and served as the Leader of the Opposition in the council from 1973 to 1976.

Serisier was born in Gilgandra, New South Wales to solicitor Leroy Dudley Serisier and Isabel Franklin MacManus. He was educated in the Gilgandra district and later went to the University of Sydney, where he studied law; he was admitted as a solicitor in 1951. He was partner in several legal practices, and was called to the bar in 1976. He served in the Citizen Military Forces with the 6th New South Wales Mounted Rifles from 1950 to 1952. On 5 November 1955 he married Rosemary Dalton, with whom he had four children. He also had a further two children, Andrew Lee Hamilton Clark and Michael Dudley John Clark

Serisier joined the Labor Party in 1953, holding positions in the office branch, state and federal electorate councils, and the central executive. He was the Labor candidate for the federal seat of Calare at the 1960 by-election, the 1961 federal election and the 1963 federal election, but never came close to victory. In 1970 he was elected to the New South Wales Legislative Council, becoming Labor's leader in that chamber in 1973 and holding the position until 1976. He retired from politics at the 1978 state election, when the size of the council was reduced.
