= Sam Farraway =

Australian politician (born 1986)

The Honourable Sam Farraway

Minister for Regional Transport and Roads
- In office 21 December 2021 – 28 March 2023
- Premier: Dominic Perrottet
- Preceded by: Paul Toole
- Succeeded by: Jenny Aitchison

Member of the New South Wales Legislative Council
- In office 17 October 2019 – 9 December 2024
- Preceded by: Niall Blair
- Succeeded by: Nichole Overall

Personal details
- Party: The Nationals

Samuel Jacob Farraway (born 1986) is an Australian former politician who served in the New South Wales Legislative Council from October 2019 to December 2024 and as the Minister for Regional Transport and Roads in the second Perrottet ministry between December 2021 and March 2023. He is a member of the NSW Nationals.

Farraway resigned from the Legislative Council after he was preselected as The Nationals candidate for Calare in July 2024 for the 2025 federal election, but was unsuccessful. He had also previously contested for federal parliament as a Senate candidate in the 2019 federal election, and unsuccessfully ran for party pre-selection for Calare for the 2016 federal election.

== Background ==
Farraway was born in Bathurst Base Hospital in 1986 to Warren and Leanne Farraway, and is the eldest of five children. Warren Farraway was involved in the automotive trade. In 1988, Warren and Leanne Farraway purchased a Hertz car rental franchise in Bathurst. Sam started to manage the family-run Hertz business in 2004. After operating for 30 years, the Farraway family sold the business in 2018.

For over 10 years prior to his appointment as a member of the Legislative Council, Farraway was the president of Bathurst Agricultural, Horticultural and Pastoral Association, which runs the annual Royal Bathurst Show.

In 2015 he won the young entrepreneur of the year at the Carillon Business Awards.

== Political career ==
In 2007, Farraway met Kerry Bartlett, the then-federal Liberal MP for Macquarie, prior to the 2007 federal election. Farraway helped out in Bartlett's election campaign, by being the booth captain, packing booth kits, staffing pre-poll centres, and had a picture of Barlett's face on his car for five weeks. Bartlett ultimately lost his seat at the election.

Three years later, in 2010, Farraway met John Cobb, the then-federal Nationals MP for Calare, prior to the 2010 federal election. Again, Farraway helped out with the election campaign and became the booth captain, performing the same tasks as he did for Bartlett's campaign. Cobb comfortably retained his seat in the election. In 2012, 18 months after the election, Farraway joined the Nationals after Cobb's recommendation.

After joining the Nationals, Farraway was the chair of the party's Bathurst branch, Bathurst State Electoral Council, Calare Federal Electorate Council, and a central executive member of the party. He was also the campaign manager for Cobb's election campaign in the 2013 federal election and for Paul Toole's election campaign in the 2019 New South Wales state election. As of November 2019, he is also the senior vice chair of the NSW Nationals.

Following Cobb's retirement in February 2016, Farraway unsuccessfully contested the Nationals' preselection for the federal seat of Calare for the 2016 federal election, which was contested by Andrew Gee instead. During the 2019 half-Senate election in May, Farraway contested unsuccessfully as a candidate for New South Wales in an unwinnable 5th position of the Coalition ticket.

In March 2019, Niall Blair announced his intention to resign from New South Wales Legislative Council and would do so when a replacement was found. Farraway won the party's preselection in September 2019 to fill Blair's upcoming vacancy. Blair resigned from the Council on 16 October 2019, and Farraway was appointed as a member of the Legislative Council the following day on 17 October 2019. In December 2021, Farraway was sworn in as the Minister for Regional Transport and Roads in the Perrottet ministry. He held the position until the Liberal-National Coalition lost the 2023 state election in March that year.

On 20 July 2024, Farraway was preselected as the Nationals candidate for Calare for the 2025 federal election, after Gee had resigned from the party two years earlier. On 9 December 2024, Farraway resigned from the Legislative Council and was succeeded in the Legislative Council by former member for Monaro Nichole Overall. At the federal election in May 2025, Farraway came first on first preference votes. However, after preference distributions, he ultimately lost to Gee, who was contesting as an independent candidate.

Political offices
| Preceded by Paul Toole | Minister for Regional Transport and Roads; 2021–2023 | Succeeded by Jenny Aitchison |
