= Peter Andren =

Australian politician (1946–2007)

Peter Andren AM

Member of the Australian Parliament for Calare
- In office 2 March 1996 – 17 October 2007
- Preceded by: David Simmons
- Succeeded by: John Cobb

Personal details
- Born: Peter James Andren; 28 August 1946 Gulargambone, New South Wales, Australia
- Died: 3 November 2007 (aged 61)
- Party: Independent
- Spouse: Jenny Price (divorced)
- Children: Greg, Josh
- Education: Macquarie University
- Occupation: Teacher, journalist

Peter James Andren AM (28 August 1946 – 3 November 2007) was an Australian politician. He was an independent member of the Australian House of Representatives from March 1996 until October 2007, representing the electorate of Calare, New South Wales.

== Biography ==
Peter Andren was born in Gulargambone, New South Wales, and attended Normanhurst Boys High School and Macquarie University, Sydney. He was a teacher, television reporter, presenter and producer and radio and television news editor with Prime Television and 2GZ before entering politics.

The Andren Report, by Peter Andren

In the 1996 election, he stood for election in Calare. He was not only displeased with the quality of candidates in the field to succeed longtime Labor incumbent David Simmons, but felt that rural Australia was losing its voice in Canberra. It was initially thought that Simmons' retirement gave the Nationals a chance to take the seat. However, owing partly to his name recognition (Prime's service area covered most of the electorate), Andren finished just ahead of Labor on the primary vote. After Liberal preferences allowed the Nationals to overtake Labor for second, Andren won the seat after Labor's preferences flowed overwhelmingly to him, taking 63 percent of the two-candidate vote. He held the seat without serious difficulty in the next three elections; his two candidate-preferred vote of over 75 per cent in 2001 made Calare the second-safest seat in Australia.

He attempted to implement changes to politicians' superannuation, involving giving members the opportunity to opt out of the parliamentary scheme. He introduced a Private Member's Bill to this extent, which failed to pass through either house. He had been an active opponent of genetically modified crops, and was involved with the Standing Committee on Primary Industries and Regional Services. Andren was known to join with the other two rural independent members, Bob Katter and Tony Windsor, in raising regional issues with the Parliament and media. He was also a vocal critic of Australia's policy on asylum seekers, and the Iraq War.

A redistribution of electoral boundaries in 2006 effectively cut Calare in half and reduced Andren's notional majority, leading to speculation that he might have stood for the neighbouring seat of Macquarie, which now included former Calare cities Bathurst and Lithgow, at the next election. On 29 March 2007, he instead made an announcement that he would stand down from Calare to contest a New South Wales seat in the Senate—a race that it was widely believed he would win.

However he subsequently announced on 10 August 2007 that he had been diagnosed with pancreatic cancer and that "the diagnosis and available interventions to treat this cancer are not very encouraging." Due to his illness, he had to abandon his candidacy for a seat in the Senate and he saw out his term as member for Calare until the parliament was dissolved on 17 October, before the 2007 election. He died less than three weeks later, on 3 November, survived by his partner Valerie Faber, his two sons Greg and Josh and his ex-wife Jenny Price. His funeral at Holy Trinity Anglican Church in Orange was attended by an estimated 600–1000 people.

Andren's seat of Calare was won by John Cobb for the National Party at the 2007 election.

On 9 June 2008 Andren's appointment as a Member of the Order of Australia was posthumously announced. The award cited his services in Parliament and to rural and regional Australia.

After his death, the Orange Aboriginal Medical Service set up a $5,000 medical scholarship named in Andren's honour.

Parliament of Australia
Preceded by David Simmons	Member for Calare; 1996–2007	Succeeded by John Cobb
