= John Breen (Australian politician) =

Australian politician (1898–1966)

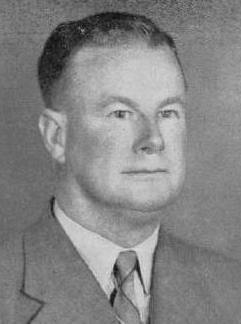

Member of the Australian Parliament for Calare
- In office 21 September 1940 – 28 September 1946
- Preceded by: Harold Thorby
- Succeeded by: John Howse

Personal details
- Born: 1898 Kalgoorlie, Western Australia
- Died: 5 February 1966 (aged 67–68)
- Party: Australian Labor Party
- Occupation: Publican, unionist

John Patrick Breen (1898 – 5 February 1966) was an Australian politician. Born in Kalgoorlie, Western Australia, he attended Catholic schools and then the University of Sydney. He became a publican and organiser of the Australian Workers' Union before being elected to the Australian House of Representatives in 1940 representing the seat of Calare for the Labor Party. He defeated sitting Country Party MP Harold Thorby. He held the seat until his defeat by Liberal John Howse in 1946, after which he became Trade Commissioner to the Middle East from 1946 to 1948. He died in 1966.

Parliament of Australia
Preceded by Harold Thorby	Member for Calare; 1940 – 1946	Succeeded by John Howse
