= Sandy Mackenzie =

Australian politician

Sandy Mackenzie AM

Member of the Australian Parliament for Calare
- In office 13 December 1975 – 5 March 1983
- Preceded by: John England
- Succeeded by: David Simmons

Personal details
- Born: 29 August 1941 (age 85) Melbourne, Victoria, Australia
- Party: National
- Education: University of New England
- Occupation: Educator

Alexander John Mackenzie AM (born 29 August 1941) is a former Australian politician. He was a member of the House of Representatives from 1975 to 1983, representing the New South Wales seat of Calare for the National Party. He was principal of an agricultural college before entering parliament and later became involved with conservationist organisations.

== Early life ==
Mackenzie was born in Melbourne on 29 August 1941. His father was killed in World War II while fighting on the New Guinea campaign and he was raised on his grandfather's farm near Seymour, Victoria.

Mackenzie attended Geelong Grammar School. He subsequently completed the degree of Master of Rural Science at the University of New England. After lecturing at Marcus Oldham College in Geelong for a period, he returned to New South Wales in 1970 and was appointed principal of Orange Agricultural College (later incorporated into the University of New England).

== Politics ==
Mackenzie was elected to the House of Representatives at the 1975 federal election, retaining the seat of Calare for the National Country Party following the retirement of incumbent MP John England.

In parliament, Mackenzie serving on the Standing Committee on Environment and Conservation from 1980 to 1983 and was made a deputy whip for the National Party in 1981. His seat became increasingly marginal following a redistribution before the 1977 election and was regarded as a key seat at the election, with several national figures campaigning in the electorate. He narrowly retained Calare at the 1980 election, but lost his seat to the Australian Labor Party candidate David Simmons at the 1983 election.

== Later activities ==
After leaving parliament, Mackenzie was executive director of the Geelong Grammar Foundation from 1984 to 1995. He was later active in conservation circles as an advocate for "restoration of the lower Darling River, sustainable farming and community empowerment in public environmental and agricultural policy". He served on the Victorian advisory council for Landcare Australia and represented the organisation at the National Drought Summit in 2018. He also served on the Goulburn Broken Catchment Management Authority from 2010 to 2017.

Mackenzie was appointed a Member of the Order of Australia in the 2023 King's Birthday Honours for "significant service to the people and Parliament of Australia, to education, and to conservation".

Parliament of Australia
Preceded by John England	Member for Calare; 1975–1983	Succeeded by David Simmons
