= Thomas Lavelle =

Australian politician (1887–1944)

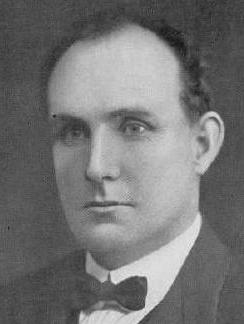

Member of the Australian Parliament for Calare
- In office 13 December 1919 – 16 December 1922
- Preceded by: Henry Pigott
- Succeeded by: Neville Howse

Personal details
- Born: 2 December 1887 Liverpool, New South Wales
- Died: 24 May 1944 (aged 56)
- Party: Australian Labor Party
- Occupation: Unionist

Thomas James Lavelle (2 December 1887 – 24 May 1944) was an Australian politician. He was an Australian Labor Party member of the Australian House of Representatives from 1919 to 1922, representing the electorate of Calare.

Lavelle was born into a farming family in the Cowra district. His father died when he was aged 18, leaving him to support his mother and six younger siblings. He worked the family farm successfully while also taking on work as a shearer and bush worker to supplement the income from the farm. He also worked as an organiser for the Australian Workers' Union for several years. He campaigned against conscription during the 1916 and 1917 referendums and was the unsuccessful Labor candidate for Calare at the 1917 election. He sold the farm and moved to Sydney when he was 32, around the time of his election to parliament.

In 1919, he was elected to the Australian House of Representatives as the Labor member for Calare, defeating Nationalist MP Henry Pigott. He only served one term when before his defeat by Nationalist Neville Howse at the 1922 election. During the 1922 campaign, he was slated for his parliamentary attendance during the previous term, with reports that he had only attended 9 out of 63 sittings, the equal lowest for an MP in the House. Following his parliamentary defeat, he worked as a land and estate agent in Sydney.

During the 1930s, he was the proprietor of Scott's Hotel at Wagga Wagga, then the Club House Hotel at Gundagai and then later of McQuillans Hotel at Bankstown. He also served as president of the Federated Railway Leagues Council. He was the Labor candidate at the 1930 state election, but then served as a member of the state executive of the Federal Labor Party in the wake of the 1931 Labor split, which saw most of the state branch break away as Lang Labor. He was an unsuccessful Federal Labor candidate at the 1932 and 1935 state elections and 1934 federal election. In 1940, during the second Lang Labor split, he was campaign director for the official Labor campaign against prominent Lang Labor MP Jack Beasley.

He died in Sydney in 1944. He married Margaret Ann HILDEBRAND in 1920; she predeceased him 10 December 1936. They had five children.

Parliament of Australia
Preceded by Henry Pigott	Member for Calare; 1919–1922	Succeeded by Neville Howse
