= David Simmons (Australian politician) =

Australian politician (born 1947)

The Honourable David Simmons OAM

Member of the Australian Parliament for Calare
- In office 5 March 1983 – 29 January 1996
- Preceded by: Sandy Mackenzie
- Succeeded by: Peter Andren

Personal details
- Born: 7 January 1947 (age 79) Broken Hill, New South Wales
- Party: Australian Labor Party
- Spouse: Kaye Scoble
- Education: University of New England
- Occupation: Teacher, government consultant

David William Simmons, OAM (born 7 November 1947) is an Australian former politician who served as a member of the Australian House of Representatives from 1983 to 1996, representing the seat of Calare for the Australian Labor Party. Simmons held several junior Ministerial positions in the governments of Labor prime ministers Bob Hawke and Paul Keating.

== Early career ==
Simmons was born in Broken Hill, New South Wales and arrived in Bathurst, New South Wales in 1965 and commenced study for teacher training at Bathurst Teacher's College.

After graduation, Simmons taught at Tullibigeal Central, Bletchington and Broken Hill North before changing to secondary teaching and transferring to Bathurst High School where he became Head Teacher of Social Science. He had also completed a Bachelor of Arts and a Masters of Education with honours from the University of New England.

Simmons was an elected Alderman on Bathurst City Council from 1978 to 1983.

== Federal political career ==
Simmons was elected to the Australian House of Representatives seat of Calare at the 1983 federal election, after two unsuccessful attempts, representing the Australian Labor Party. Simmons was re-elected as Member for Calare at the 1984, 1987, 1990, and 1993 Australian federal elections.

He was appointed Minister for Defence Science and Personnel in April 1989 in the third Hawke ministry. In April 1990, in the fourth Hawke ministry, Simmons became Minister for the Arts, Tourism and Territories. In December 1991, Simmons became Minister for Family Support from and Minister for Local Government in the first Keating ministry. Following the March 1993 Australian federal election, Simmons was not re-appointed to the second Keating ministry.

During the National Tax Summit in 1985, Simmons initially raised the concept of a national identity card, later entitled as the Australia Card, as a measure to address community and government concern about tax evasion and tax avoidance; concerns over the extent of welfare fraud; fears over the extent of illegal immigration. Additionally, there was a belief expressed in some quarters that an identity card or national registration procedure might assist the government's administration processes. Legislation was introduced into Parliament and finally rejected by the Australian Senate in 1987 after significant community concerns, including privacy. Following his retirement from Parliament, Simmons conceded that he didn't think the concept would ever be accepted by the public.

During his Parliamentary career, Simmons was the Australian representative at the UN in New York for three months and delivered an address on the apartheid policy in South Africa.

Simmons retired from Parliament ahead of the 1996 federal election and moved to Newcastle.

== Post political career ==
Since his retirement from politics, Simmons has served on a number of government and non-profit Boards, including:

- Chief executive Officer of Newcastle and Hunter Business Chamber (1997–2001)
- General manager of Newcastle Regional Chamber of Commerce (1997 -1998?)
- Director of Tourism NSW (1997–2003)
- Chairman of the Hunter Medical Research Institute Foundation (2002–2003)
- Director of the Regional Land Management Corporation (a subsidiary of the Hunter Water Corporation) (2003–2005)
- President of the New South Wales division of the National Heart Foundation of Australia (2006–2009).

He served as the independent chair, Western NSW Medicare Local, 2012–15 and served as a director of Western Health Alliance t/a Western NSW PHN from 2015 to 2019. In October 2017 he was appointed as the independent chair, Asthma Australia Ltd.

During 2006, Simmons was appointed by the NSW Minister for Local Government to undertake a formal public inquiry into Broken Hill City Council.

Simmons' wife, Kaye, has also held positions in the New South Wales division of the Labor Party. In 2006, it was reported that she was on the ALP administrative committee and served as campaign manager for Jodi McKay, Labor candidate and subsequent Member for Newcastle.

== Honours ==
In 2001, Simmons was awarded the Medal of the Order of Australia (OAM) for services to the Australian Parliament and the community of the Hunter Region.

Political offices
Preceded by Ros Kelly	Minister for Defence Science and Personnel; 1989–1990	Succeeded by Gordon Bilney
Preceded by Clyde Holding	Minister for the Arts, Tourism and Territories; 1990–91	Succeeded by Wendy Fatin
New title	Minister for Family Support; 1991–93	Succeeded by Rosemary Crowley
Preceded by Wendy Fatin	Minister for Local Government; 1991–93	Succeeded by Brian Howe
Parliament of Australia
Preceded by Sandy Mackenzie	Member for Calare; 1983–96	Succeeded by Peter Andren
