= George Gibbons =

Australian politician

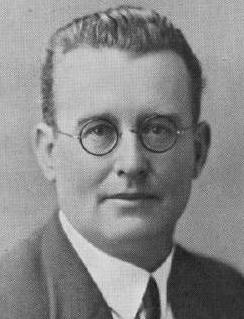

Member of the Australian Parliament for Calare
- In office 12 October 1929 – 19 December 1931
- Preceded by: Neville Howse
- Succeeded by: Harold Thorby

Personal details
- Born: 1887 Tichborne, New South Wales
- Died: 11 August 1956 (aged 68–69)
- Party: Australian Labor Party
- Occupation: Unionist

George Albert Reginald Gibbons (1887 – 11 August 1956) was an Australian politician. He was an Australian Labor Party member of the Australian House of Representatives from 1929 to 1931, representing the regional New South Wales electorate of Calare.

== Early life and career ==
Gibbons was born in the small town of Tichborne, New South Wales, just south of Parkes. He received a primary education before becoming a farm labourer and then a farmer. He was an inaugural organiser (1910–1911) and then NSW state secretary (1911–1912) of the short-lived Rural Workers Union of Australia, which amalgamated with the Australian Workers Union in 1913; Gibbons remained a member of the AWU thereafter. He was secretary of the Tichborne branch of the Political Labour League and the party's Calare federal electorate council. He later became a farmer and stock and station agent and justice of the peace at Parkes, operating a 1700-acre property, "The Plains", in conjunction with his brother.

== Election to parliament ==
Gibbons was elected to the House of Representatives at the 1929 federal election, securing a 12.3% swing to defeat Nationalist Minister for Health Sir Neville Howse in a significant victory. Gibbons' farming experience, his advocacy of policies for wheat and wool price stabilisation to provide financial security to primary producers, and a frenetic 16-day tour of the large electorate were reported as being key to his success. The Scullin Labor government proved repeatedly unwilling to stabilise prices on the profitable terms Gibbons had advocated, which led to repeated criticism in regional media for making promises he could not deliver. He supported the proposed Burrendong Dam, though it would not be built for many years, and was unable to gain support for a Commonwealth Bank branch in Parkes.

== The "Gibbons Plan" ==
Gibbons was critical of the Scullin government's early response to the Great Depression in Australia, preferring using the Commonwealth Bank to extend loans and extending the terms of existing loans rather than the Cabinet's mix of austerity measures and increased debt. In October 1930, Gibbons put to caucus an alternative policy proposal that came to be known as the "Gibbons Plan": that the Commonwealth Bank be instructed to "create sufficient credit as and when required" to finance the operations of government in respect of all parliamentary appropriations, meet government loan debt requirements not otherwise provided for, and finance state and Commonwealth works programs up to a limit of £20,000,000. Gibbons' proposal was supported by a majority of the Labor caucus in November, triggering a crisis that would lead to the resignation of Treasurer Joseph Lyons and laid the seeds for the 1931 Labor split. Gibbons also continued to press his demands for fixing higher wheat prices, which saw the Labor caucus agree to instruct Cabinet to prepare a bill guaranteeing wheat prices at a fixed level and to call a double dissolution election if it were blocked either by the Senate or by the Commonwealth Bank board. In January 1931, the Labor caucus resolved that the continued leadership of Prime Minister Scullin was conditional on his full acceptance of Gibbons' resolution.

However, after Ted Theodore assumed the role of Treasurer later that month, Scullin and the Cabinet slowly backed away from full acceptance of the terms of Gibbons' proposal, with attention increasingly drawn instead to the rapidly deepening split in the party and the issue of the renegade New South Wales Premier Jack Lang, who was pursuing his own radical ideas about how to deal with the Depression. Gibbons would claim during his re-election campaign that "a great deal of [the Gibbons Plan] had been carried into effect" and that "in fact, it was the Gibbons Plan which had carried the country out of the economic darkness and started it on the way to prosperity." He argued that the Commonwealth Bank's decision to "take up budgetary deficits", the reduction in interest rates in the Premiers' Plan and a bonus for the wheat industry constituted effective adoption.

== Support for the Premiers' Plan, rejection of Lang and electoral defeat ==
Although he had opposed much of Scullin's fiscal policy in the early stages of the Great Depression and had pushed the government to the brink of crisis in pursuit of his own alternative policy proposals, Gibbons loudly and repeatedly rejected the radical alternative proposals for dealing with the Depression being put forward by New South Wales Premier Jack Lang. This saw him side with Scullin's federal Labor Party against Lang's state Labor Party in the resulting party split. In March 1931, he voted against a censure motion that posed a serious threat to the continuation of the Scullin government.

In May 1931, he threatened to resign from the Labor Party over its inability to deal with the Depression, attacking the "egotism and insane policy of Lang", and then voted against a government tariff bill, labelling it "fiscal insanity" for its impact on primary producers. In June 1931, he announced his general support for the austerity measures of the Premiers' Plan, declaring "no other course is practicable", that "in no other country in the world did the individual receive the benefit of such extensive social legislation" and that "no country in the world could afford to carry on such a system when the national income has been so greatly reduced". In August 1931, he accused Lang of "practically stealing...money from wheatgrowers" for directing funds from an impost on flour into consolidated revenue instead of to farmers as they had expected. In the same month, he declared that the Premiers' Plan was "insufficient to provide for Australia's rehabilitation", suggesting that a "general writing down" may be needed so that landholders could continue to meet their liabilities.

Gibbons was defeated by Country Party candidate Harold Thorby in a three-cornered race with a Lang candidate at the 1931 election, a widely speculated outcome due to his unexpected win in 1929 and the fallout of that year's split in the Labor Party. Gibbons finished last of the three candidates behind Thorby and the Lang candidate, with Thorby winning an absolute majority of votes.

== Post-politics and later life ==
After his political defeat, Gibbons resumed his business and farming interests. He had a stormy relationship with the Labor Party in the period immediately following; in January 1932, he was expelled from the Lang-controlled state Labor Party, responding that he had never been a member of the "Lang Labor Party", and in April 1932 resigned from the Labor Party entirely, lashing Lang for his rejection of the Premiers' Plan. He spoke at a number of United Australia Party rallies in 1932 and it was widely rumoured that Gibbons would follow some of his former Labor colleagues into the conservative UAP; however, this never eventuated.

In 1933, he campaigned against the UAP state government's successful referendum to reform the New South Wales Legislative Council, declaring that the government was "controlled by the financial institutions". Despite his very public resignation from the Labor Party in 1932, he rejoined the party at some point in the early-to-mid-1930s; he was reported to have unsuccessfully sought federal Labor preselection for his old seat in 1934, and by 1936 was a delegate to the party's national conference.

Gibbons became highly active in the Wheatgrowers' Union of New South Wales in the 1930s, becoming its vice-president in the mid-1930s and then its president from 1936 to 1939, a position which made him a prominent public commentator and advocate on wheat industry issues. He was appointed to a series of industry boards by Labor governments in the 1940s: the federal Fodder Conservation Commission (1942) and Australian Meat Board (1946), as well as both the NSW Wheat Advisory Board and Australian Wheat Board later that decade. Gibbons made one final attempt to enter politics as the Labor candidate for his old seat of Calare at the 1949 federal election, but was soundly defeated. He died in 1956.

Parliament of Australia
| Preceded by Neville Howse | Member for Calare; 1929 – 1931 | Succeeded by Harold Thorby |
