= Old Bathurst Hospital =

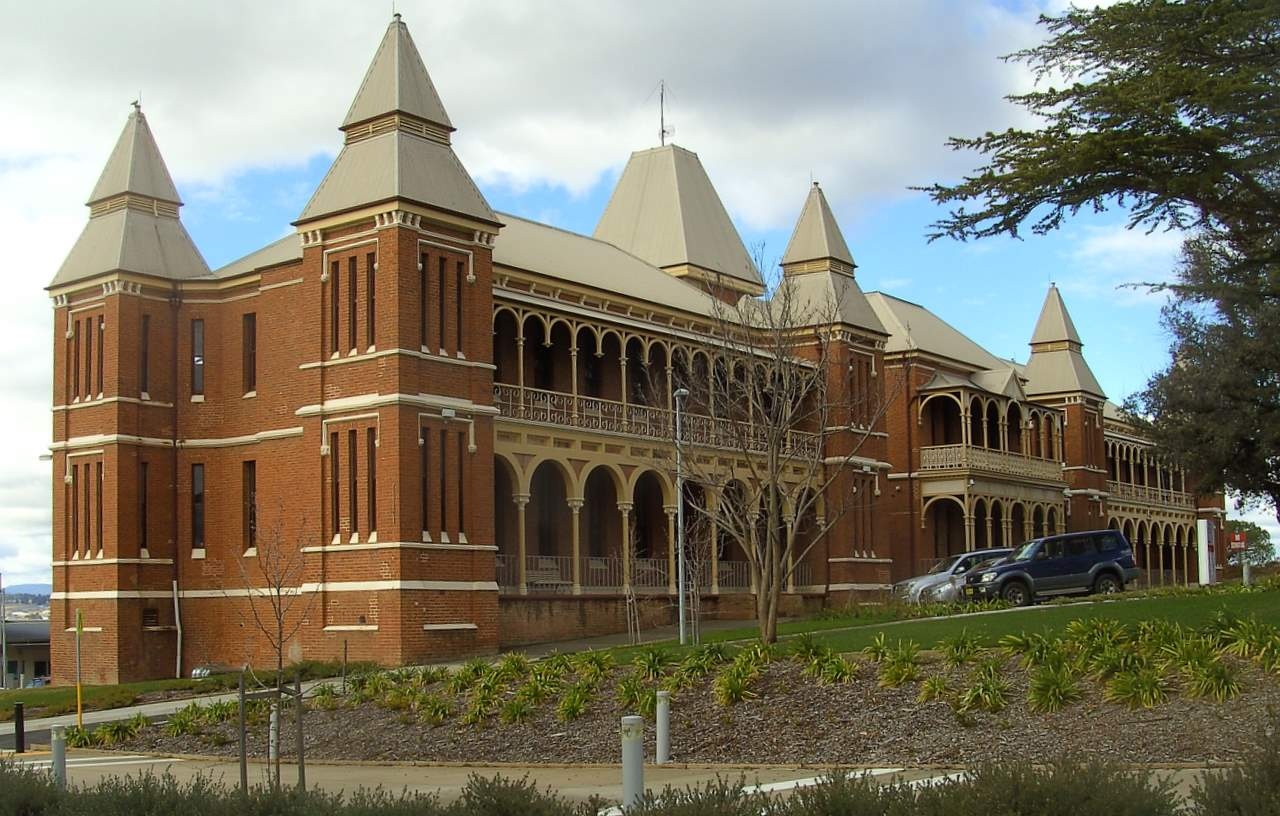

- Location within New South Wales Location within Australia
- 33.4062°S 149.5723°E
- Location: Howick Street, Bathurst, Bathurst Region, New South Wales, Australia

History
- Built: 1880–1886

Site notes
- Architect: William Boles
- Owner: NSW Department of Health

New South Wales Heritage Register
- Official name: Bathurst District Hospital; Bathurst Base Hospital (excl later additions to northeast & cancer care cottage)
- Type: state heritage (built)
- Designated: 2 April 1999
- Reference no.: 815
- Type: Hospital
- Category: Health Services
- Builders: J. Willet

The Old Bathurst Hospital is a heritage-listed hospital building at Howick Street, Bathurst, Bathurst Region, New South Wales, Australia. Formerly the main building of the Bathurst Hospital, it was conserved and restored when a new hospital was built on the same site in 2006–2008, and is now used as consulting suites and an education centre for the new hospital. The building was designed by William Boles and built from 1880 to 1886 by J Willet. It was also known as Bathurst District Hospital or Bathurst Base Hospital before the redevelopment. The property is owned by the NSW Department of Health. It was added to the New South Wales State Heritage Register on 2 April 1999.

== History ==
=== Bathurst ===
Governor Macquarie chose the site of the future town of Bathurst on 7 May 1815 during his tour over the Blue Mountains, on the road already completed by convict labour supervised by William Cox. Macquarie marked out the boundaries near the depot established by surveyor George Evans and reserved a site for a government house and domain. Reluctant to open the rich Bathurst Plains to a large settlement, Macquarie authorised few grants there initially, one of the first being 1000 acres to William Lawson, one of the three European explorers who crossed the mountains in 1813. The road-maker William Cox was another early grantee but later had to move his establishment to Kelso on the non-government side of the Macquarie River.

A modest release of land in February 1818 occurred when ten men were chosen to take up 50-acre farms and 2-acre town allotments across the river from the government buildings. When corruption by government supervisor Richard Lewis and acting Commandant William Cox caused their dismissal, they were replaced by Lieutenant William Lawson who became Commandant of the settlement in 1818.

According to local historian Bernard Greaves, medical services began in Bathurst on 1 April 1817 when acting assistant surgeon Harry Seymour was appointed to tend the district's few settlers and convicts at the government station. Himself a convict imprisoned there, Seymour was recorded as one of 23 convicts that acting commandant Cox recommended for emancipation. But Seymour submitted a petition for mitigation of his sentence from Richmond in December 1819 and again in 1822 so it appears he had not been freed at Bathurst and that he worked there for only a limited time.

Macquarie continued to restrict the Bathurst settlement and reserved all land on the south side of the Macquarie River for government buildings and stock, a situation that prevailed until 1826. In December 1819 Bathurst had a population of only 120 people in 30 houses, two-thirds being in the township of Kelso on the eastern side of the river and the remainder scattered on rural landholdings nearby. The official report in 1820 numbered Bathurst settlers at 114, including only 14 women and 15 children. The government buildings consisted of a brick house for the commandant, brick barracks for the military detachment and houses for the stock keeper, and log houses for the 50 convicts who worked the government farm. Never successful, the government farm was closed by Governor Darling in 1828. However Bathurst did not have any assistant surgeon in residence in 1820, as this position was one that principal surgeon James Bowman was eager to fill.

Tradition has it that the first hospital, a government establishment for convicts, was opened in a four-room weatherboard building at the corner of Howick and Bentinck Streets in 1824. Local historian Theo Barker believes that this date refers to the building rather than the establishment. He suggests that the hospital opened earlier and provides evidence that assistant surgeon James Paterson - who had been convicted of forgery - was in charge of the Bathurst Hospital in 1823 and Dr William Richardson succeeding him that year after his death in 1826. However, the Returns for the colony in 1825 de not mention the medical establishment at Bathurst even though they provide details of the hospitals at other New South Wales outposts.

Governor Darling, arriving in Sydney in 1825, promptly commenced a review of colonial administration and subsequently introduced vigorous reforms. These changes impacted the medical establishment from 1828. On advice from Viscount Goderich, Darling divided colonial expenditure into two parts: one to cover civil administration, funded by New South Wales; the other for the convict system, funded by Britain. When Darling applied the departmental hierarchical structure to the medical establishment in 1829, Bathurst was still relatively unimportant and was served by the lowest medical rating. Assistant surgeon George Busby had taken charge of the convict hospital in 1828.

By this time, J. McBrien and Robert Hoddle had surveyed the existing grants in the vicinity. Surveyor James Bym Richards began work on the south side of the river in 1826. But the town was apparently designed by Thomas Mitchell in 1830 and did not open until late 1833 after Richards had completed the layout of the streets with their two-road allotments. The first sales were held in 1831 before the survey was complete, surgeon George Busby being one of the early buyers.

In 1832 the new Governor, Major General Sir Richard Bourke, visited Bathurst in October. He instructed the Surveyor General Major Thomas L. Mitchell to make arrangements for "opening the town of Bathurst without delay" and he, in turn, instructed the Assistant Surveyor at Bathurst J.B. Richards to lay out the blocks and streets. This was done in September 1833. It is believed that Major Mitchell named the streets, with George Street being named after King George III.

A further administrative change in 1836 arose from the British order that colonial revenue must defray any part of the cost of police and gaols not "immediately connected with the custody and supervision of (transported) convicts". The latter care would continue to be financed from the British military chest. As all colonial hospitals served non-convicts as well as the transportees for whom they were established, the Lords of the Treasury now demanded tighter controls of stores and finances to ensure their contribution was directed only to convicts. To further reduce expenditure, they specified that medical officers be appointed from the ranks of army surgeons on half-pay. Colonial funds paid these doctors the difference between half and full pay, together with allowances for lodging, forage, travelling expenses or other entitlements.

The newly appointed deputy inspector-general of convict and military hospitals in NSW, John Vaughan Thompson, was instructed to visit all facilities and, together with the Governor, revise the administration to comply with the military regulations. At this time Bathurst Hospital had a staff of two. In addition, a district surgeon Fergus Hawthorne was appointed to serve the Mandurama district outside Bathurst, visiting the convict iron gangs working in the roads and their military overseers.

The change to military control of the medical establishment signalled the end of the convict system in NSW. It was a reflection of the British movement to end slavery and similar abuses of privilege, together with colonial demands for the full entitlement due to British subjects. The move to end transportation was also hastened by official support of free immigration schemes. Recommended by the Molesworth House of Commons Committee of 1837–8, the decision was confirmed by Normanby's despatch to Governor Gipps on 11 May 1839 which instructed him to cease assigning convicts to private masters and prepare Norfolk Island to receive subsequent transportees from Britain.

The Treasury informed Governor Bourke that the British government would only pay hospital costs for convicts "suffering under the sentence of law". The colony was liable to pay for any other persons admitted into the hospitals. They also refused to accept the colonial interpretation of this regulation, which limited colonial costs to persons arriving free, pointing out that ex-convicts who had become free settlers had contributed their labour to the colony since their release and the colony should bear their costs too.

Transportation of convicts to NSW officially ended in 1840 and the gradual conversion of convict hospitals to community-operated charities commenced the following year. The process was actively encouraged by Governor Gipps who presided over the genesis of representative government as laid out in the Constitution Act of 1842, providing for local (district) councils. Gipps supported these to defray costs of central government, wanting local rates to support local infrastructure and services. However, the councils Gipps intended to raise revenue were not successful.

Bathurst was one of three convict hospitals that Gipps promptly transferred to local administrations in 1842, making them responsible for the "gratuitous treatment of sick and indigent persons". In so doing, Gipps referred again to what he believed was a "long established principle" that when a charge was transferred from Britain to the colony, the buildings would be transferred with it, as in the case of police stations and gaols. For its part, Britain was anxious to reduce all convict establishments in NSW as soon as possible and requested that the process be accelerated.

Gipps went further. He encouraged the granting of pound-for-pound subsidies to hospitals in Windsor, Bathurst and Goulburn after their transfer to local control in 1842 and the NSW Legislative Council extended the policy by granting subsidies on the same basis for the operating costs in 1843 and 1844. The other five convict hospitals were handed over to local district committees in 1848.

Only too aware that the convict building was inadequate, the Bathurst Hospital Committee commenced preparing for a new hospital in 1873 when they sought a new site. Applying to the NSW Parliament for 10 acres of town land through Francis Bathurst Suttor MLA, they were granted 6 acres of Crown land on 5 May 1876. The site, which was increased by a further 4 acres and 30 perches on 30 September 1882, ultimately covered the whole of Section 60, half of a reserved area on elevated ground at the northern end of the town, about 3/4 of a mile from the civic buildings. On opposite sides of Howick Street, both the old and new hospital sites are shown in the 1882 Town Plan.

The new hospital design was a result of a competition following the 1878 destruction by fire of the original 1824 convict hospital in Bentinck Street.

Meanwhile, a building committee formed in June 1876 had called for a hospital plan that could be constructed for a total cost of 6000 pounds. Sydney architect William Boles won the tender from 13 applications. His design was approved by Florence Nightingale and the Minister for Public WOrks authorised his plans on 11 November 1887 after the Colonial Architect had made some modifications. The cost had risen to 9000 pounds, rival applicant Thomas Rowe disputed the appropriateness of the winning design and had to be placated by a payment of 25 pounds as second prize. Boles died in March 1880, 8 months before completion of the project.

An architect named William Boles designed a number of churches in the 1870s including St. Joseph's Catholic (Edgecliff, 1874), the Wesleyan church, Windsor (1876) and extensions to the Edmund Blacket-designed St. Matthew's Anglican Church, Albury (1876) and was apparently a former convict arriving in Sydney in the 1820s. It is unclear if this is the same person as the designer of Bathurst Hospital in 1876, though it is likely.

The new hospital's builder was J. Willet. By the time Willet's tender for construction was accepted in early January 1878, building costs had risen to 10,000 pounds including furniture and fittings. With the help of some very generous contributions from such people as Thomas Walker of (Yaralla) Concord and William Kite of Dockairne, who each donated 500 pounds, the district quickly raised the 4500 pounds needed as its contribution to construction. This was matched by the government, which also paid for furnishing the building.

When construction of the new hospital had barely commenced, on 12 December 1878, the old convict hospital building serving as Bathurst District Hospital was burnt down. The fire was so intense that the bucket brigade trying to extinguish it had to abandon the task and concentrate on evacuating the 24 male and female patients.

The Governor of NSW, Lord Augustus Loftus, opened the new building on 9 November 1880. The official party included Lady Loftus, Colonial Secretary Sir John Robertson and his wife, the Governor's aide-de-camp, and his secretary, Mr R. Bloxsome. The opening ceremony featured a grand march from the Ordnance Ground, comprising mounted troopers, the Bathurst band, the Volunteers Corps under Captain Paul, All Saints College Cadets, the Independent Order of Oddfellows, the Sons of Temperance led by Stone's String Band, the Holy Catholic Guild, the Hibernian Benefit Society and the Grand United Order of Oddfellows led by the Orange town band. Other festivities included a banquet and a Vice-Regal levee. Patients moved into the new building on 4 December.

Lavish praise in the "Bathurst Times" applauded the excellent, elevated site and described the complex, a detached central block and wings surmounted by a central tower and six corner turrets. Each wing had two wards 40 x 26' with ten beds each. Beneath the outside turrets are baths, lavatories, etc. and inside are scullery and nurses' rooms for each ward. On the ground floor are the boardroom, operating rooms and dispensary with public waiting rooms, doctors' consulting and sitting rooms. On the second floor are four bedrooms with a room for paying patients. Large underground tanks replenish the tanks in the turrets by pumping apparatus.

V. Tomkins of Pitt Street, Sydney installed hot water and other gas appliances, possibly including gaslight. The new building was, as Theo Barker points out, "merely the nucleus of a complete hospital". Almost immediately workers proceeded to enclose the balconies to stop the rain beating in.

A laundry, windmill and "swag room" were added in 1882 and that laundry replaced in 1886. In this period the committee had to replace the hardwood floors recommended by the Government Architect because the boards shrank from constant washing and created an unhealthy drainage problem. After the practice of burning old mattresses and blankets in a paddock had set off fires, a furnace was added in 1895.

The operating room received a new roof in 1893 – indicating it was on the first floor – and a completely new operating room was provided in 1904 to the plan of local architect John Job Copeman, at the top of the main tower on the south-east side. Upper storeys were used for operating rooms because of the possibility of increasing the light with skylights as well as windows. Copeman also designed the War Memorial in Kings Parade, Bathurst, completed in 1903. Telephone connections were added in 1896.

Drainage was inefficient and unhealthy and, until a well was sunk, water supply remained haphazard. Apart from a boundary fence erected during the construction period, for their first 16 years of existence, the hospital grounds were almost bare. A local resident Mr Taylor and his son voluntarily planted several trees, including a Southern (American) live oak (Quercus virginiana), on Arbor Day 1890.

Landscaping commenced in 1896 after an inspection of the grounds by the gardener employed by Bathurst Council. From that time additional trees were planted around the building, at the front and rear and garden beds were established near the entrance.

In 1906 a hand-powered lift designed by R.G.Edgell was installed.

The earliest surviving plan of the hospital is a 1911 Department of Public Works "Site Plan showing Drainage". It shows the central tower as the administration block with the women's ward on the left and men's ward on the right as one entered from Howick Street. It shows an additional operating room at ground level at the rear of the tower. The morgue was at the front on the corner of Howick and Mitre Streets and the laundry was on Mitre Street also. The property was dotted with various wells.

In 1921 and 1922 the hospital gained an isolation building for patients with infectious diseases and an emergency midwifery ward. Situated about 50' behind the rear operating theatre, the isolation block had four wards, a day room and two verandahs, enclosed with gauze in 1933. Bathrooms and toilets were at the back.

Electrical power was installed throughout the site in 1926. The hospital introduced a children's ward in 1929, by remodelling the male ward in the main block. It also built a new kitchen behind the tower block above the nurses' bedrooms.

Additions to the 1921 "Record Plan" by the Government Architect's Office record the arrangement of buildings c. 1933. Where the ground sloped away to the east, a wing was added to the central block at basement and ground floor level. This basement contained seven staff bedrooms and a women's bathroom as well as the boiler room, heating equipment and a shed for the gas engine. Above on the ground floor was a kitchen on the northern side. Although this plan shows a staff dining room addition to the north, the 1928 version shows staff using the Board Room as a dining room. On the eastern side at ground level were two operating rooms linked by a passageway; one below the new theatre built in 1904, and another of similar shape behind it as shown in the 1911 plan. The roof designed by Copeman was still in use and the second ground floor operating room had an extensive lantern. This plan shows the lift on the north-eastern corner of the male ward.

Another late-1920s change was conversion of the first floor male ward to a Children's ward. Authorised by Government Architect Wells on 31 August 1928, the plan entailed removing the posts, wooden arches and existing balustrades that gave the hospital its distinctive appearance. In their place, at both front and rear, the architects installed fibro panels to rail height and fly-proof gauze from there to the ceiling. A new electrically-powered bed lift was installed at this time.

Passage of the Hospitals Act 1929 necessitated changing the regulations. It created a Hospitals Commission with "power to appoint any or all of the directors" up to 30 June 1930 to supervise the changes. It directed all hospitals to collect fees that were raised from six shillings to ten and six per day, and these could be recovered by Court action. Funding for hospitals also changed when the pound-for-pound subsidy system made way for a Hospital Fund distributed by Parliament according to the merits and needs of services rendered. Many hospitals - Bathurst included - were alarmed by this change. The most important contribution of the Commission was its recognition that hospitals were no longer institutions for the poor alone.

The infectious block and Children's ward verandahs were enclosed c. 1930–31. In 1932 the first floor was remodelled for paying patients. A new nurses' home, Poole House, opened in 1933. Private and intermediate wards on the first floor of the main ward block opened in 1934, as did a new mortuary.

In 1942, the Public Works Dept. began building a new 3-storey ward block for obstetric and children's wards with laundry and boiler room in the basement, but wartime restrictions delayed the opening until 15 April 1944. An additional Nurses' Home, Paul House, opened on the same day in 1944. The former children's ward was refurbished as intermediate ward; the operating theatre was modernised and named the John Brock Moore Operating Theatre after a former, long-serving consultant.

In 1945-8 a much needed Aged Care facility was established on land near St. Vincent's Hospital, formerly occupied by the Greenlawn Dairy. The Macquarie Homes for the Aged's first housing, named Mary Kearney Cottages, opened in 1946. These were administered by the hospital and received hospital services.

Long-delayed additions to the hospital were planned in 1959 after discussions on site with the Commission chairman Dr. H. Selle and Government Architect E. (Ted.) Farmer. Stage 1 was a theatre operating block with central sterilising unit; new x-ray department in the former operating theatre, and replacement of the lift and boiler house. Stage 2 planned modern service rooms for all public wards and Stage 3 a private and intermediate block to release the existing intermediate ward to obstetric patients then housed on verandahs, and a new laundry. Sketches were produced in 1962 but plans not finalised until 1964.

A nurses' training school opened on campus in 1965 and work on the major extensions commenced that year. Additions and renovations were officially opened by Minister for Health, Harry Jago MLA on 15 June 1967.

During the 1960s refurbishment, the hospital enclosed the verandah at the front of the tower block with brick and glass, giving it a modern but unsympathetic facade. A new children's ward was added on the south-eastern side of the operating block and a very large boiler house on the east at the extreme edge of the elevated land.

Sometime after the establishment of the children's ward, Pixie O'Harris painted a small mural of kookaburras there. Compared to some examples of her work, it is a simple, small work. O'Harris MBE (1903–91) was an artist and author, particularly of children's books. Over forty years she decorated hospitals, schools and community institutions with murals, panels and pictures. This started because she found hospital surroundings so bleak, after the birth of her third child. Her autobiography notes that she worked at Bathurst District Hospital twice, although only one (art)work appears to remain. In 1993, her brother Olaf painted a mural in her memory in the current children's ward.

As a result of the Starr Report on Hospitals in 1969, a rationalisation process began. It recommended a unified administration be created to incorporate public health, mental health, hospital and ambulance services. This was to be organised regionally with emphasis on community health. In the new system, hospitals were to defer to the central administration, the Health Commission, which would have "power of direction" over boards of trustees. Legally, for the purpose of industrial arbitration, the Commission would be the "employer" of public hospital staff. The Health Commission began operating on 2 April 1973.

In the new system, Bathurst continued to be classified as a district hospital and became headquarters of the Central West Region. From that time, the board lobbied the Commission for elevation to the status of Base Hospital because only such hospitals would be able to offer specialised treatment.

In 1976 a regional rehabilitation centre was built next to the Macquarie Homes for the Aged. Comprising a 40-bed ward and therapy unit, it was the first rural centre of its type. Named the Bill Dow Therapy Centre in memory of a long-term supporter of the hospital, it was opened by Health Minister Kevin Stewart on 10 December 1976. A Vocational Rehabilitation Facility was incorporated in 1979.

The new ward block that Bathurst Hospital Board had requested for over 20 years was finally granted in 1976. McKell & Rigby's tender for a 2-storey block to accommodate 62 beds was accepted by the Commission. This was built on the north-east side of the hospital and intended for male and female surgical patients. Completed in 1978, it was designed by Thomson, Glendenning and Paul P/L, architects. Health Minister Kevin Stewart opened the new building, which would replace the Nightingale wards built almost 100 years earlier, in November 1878.

The centenary of the hospital's 1880 buildings was marked by a restoration that adhered to their original design but also fitted them to serve late-20th century needs. Project architect D.C. (Daryl) Jackson for the Government Architect's Office concluded it would be less costly to restore the buildings and refit them for needy departments than to build a new building. Refurbishment took place in three stages. The new Casualty Department in the original female surgical ward opened on 28 April 1983 by Johno Johnson president of the Legislative Council. Redevelopment of the original male ward into a new Pathology Laboratory and Parent Accommodation was opened on 21 November 1984 by Health Minister Ron Mulock. The boardroom executive staff offices, nursing administration, pay office, computer facilities and accounting staff were fitted in and around the central tower block. Verandahs along the fronts were restored to their open state but the passage linking the three buildings was glazed to protect the interior from the extremes of the Bathurst climate.

In 1985 Bathurst District Hospital and St. Vincents Hospital, Bathurst signed an agreement to rationalise and share services and avoid duplication. BDH would provide general medical, surgical, obstetric, paediatric, accident, emergency and radiology services and a high-dependency ward for high-risk patients. St. Vincents would provide geriatric, psychiatric, development disability, dormiciarly nursing, drug and alcohol and renal dialysis as well as episodic care beds.

Also in 1985, nurse education was moved out of hospitals and into colleges of advanced education. Subsequently, BDH provided the clinical education component for trainees studying for the Diploma in Advanced Science (Nursing) at the Mitchell College of Advanced Education, Bathurst. Trainee nurses continued to live in the nurses' accommodation provided at the hospital as there was insufficient at the College.

BDH was upgraded to Base Hospital status in 1988.

On 1 November 1987 work began on another major building incorporating a paediatric ward at basement level and day surgery centre at ground level. A vacant third floor was included for future development.

Community fund-raising began in 1994 for provision of a children's cancer facility. Daffodil Cottage opened in late 1996, designed by Sue and David McGregor Projects, architects and builders, on a former tennis court on the corner of Howick and Commonwealth Streets.

In 1999 BDH got state government grant funds for additions to the Accident and Emergency Department. The design team comprised the NSW Department of Public Works and Services, architect John Blackwood from Orange and a design committee from the hospital. The addition was on the south-eastern side of the hospital, facing the park, making it more prominent than the wards added on the northern and eastern sides. The extension was set back from the original hospital so as not to impinge on the (its) towers. The outside wall was designed with lancet windows and a continuation of the drip mould between ground and first floors, as featured in the original hospital building.

In the early 2000s, the Mid-Western Area Health Service (MWAHS) reviewed the Bathurst and Orange Health Services with a view to consolidation, reorganisation and provision of the best services in the best facilities in the best locations. As part of this review, MWAHS conducted community surveys on views regarding alternative site options for locating health facilities in both locations. The Bathurst hospital facilities survey put forward three options, being the current Base Hospital, St.Vincents' Hospital site and the Macquarie Care Centre site. Responses strongly favoured the existing hospital site.

In December 2005, the state government invited firms to tender for a new hospital on the existing site, adjacent to what was then the emergency department. The $95 million redevelopment, consisting of a new two to three-storey building with 149 beds, a mental health unit and a state-of-the-art accident and emergency ward was formally approved in May 2006, with work beginning in August 2006. The new hospital commenced operations on 21 January 2008.

The new hospital was initially plagued with reports of serious design problems, including blocked pipes that flooded the hospital with raw sewage, intensive care cubicles that were too small, a car park too low to accommodate vehicles transporting disabled people and complaints that the hospital shook every time a landing took place on the new helipad, and a sheer drop accessible from the proposed mental health unit. In mid-February, the hospital's Medical Staff Committee voted to suspend all non-essential surgery due to safety concerns relating to the operating theatre communication system. The problems were so severe that the demolition of parts of the old hospital was halted in case the buildings needed to be reactivated, and doctors called for the entire new hospital to be torn down and rebuilt. A senior planning official was stood down and the state health minister, Reba Meagher, instructed the department to withhold progress payments to builder John Holland Group until the situation was resolved. A staged resumption of elective surgery began in mid-March after some efforts to address the problems. By early April, many of the defects had been remedied, while planning was underway as to how to remedy the structural defects in the intensive care unit. The intensive care alternations finally began in September 2008.

Much of the old hospital was demolished following the completion of the new hospital, with only the heritage former main hospital building, Poole House and Daffodil Cottage surviving. The demolition of the remainder of the hospital was completed by August 2008. Stage two of the redevelopment consisted of the complete internal refurbishment and fit-out of the historic hospital building. The stage two redevelopment won a Master Builders Association excellence in construction award in 2012. The heritage building now serves as consulting suites and an education centre.

== Description ==
=== Grounds ===
The Bathurst Hospital complex is best described as a collection of buildings set within a simple landscape of grass and trees. The front entrance, at the high point of the site, is formal in layout, designed to reinforce and complement the street facade of the original 1880s hospital building. The location of the entrance on Howick Street, with its views over the park to the north-east and panorama of the surrounding countryside, together with the formality of the landscape lends a quality of grandeur and importance to the main entrance. The front boundary is defined by a low brick wall, with entrance and exit gate posts which open on to the semi-circular driveway and simple garden planting containing a stone-edged plot of lawn, rockery and pergola and two very large (1890) southern live oaks (Quercus virginiana) from America.

The remainder of the grounds is dominated by various, well-established exotic trees (mostly cypresses (Cupressus spp./cv.), wide expanses of grass and small garden beds planted with dwarf heavenly bamboo (Nandina domestica 'Nana') and golden cypress.

The earliest known plantings on the site were several trees including the southern live oaks, by a local man Mr Thomson and his son, on Arbor Day 1890.

Further landscaping commenced in 1896 after an inspection of the grounds by the gardener employed by Bathurst Council. From that time additional trees were planted around the building, at the front and rear and garden beds were established near the entrance.

A 1920s photograph shows that part of the picket fence had been replaced. A low brick wall with entry gate posts, surmounted by lights, had been built in front of the main hospital entrance.

In addition to the formal entry, there are two obvious stages of landscape development on site. These are the landscape to the north of the site, most likely post construction of the Maternity and Children's wards in the early 1940s which included a number of Himalayan cedars (Cedrus deodara) and construction and planting of various garden beds with rock or Koppers log edging. These are planted with dwarf heavenly bamboo (Nandina domestica 'Nana') and golden cypress (Cupressus sp./cv.) and other assorted shrubs, particularly in the south-west section of the site, which is likely to have occurred post-1980.

=== Old hospital building complex ===
This is a large late Victorian hospital complex in the second empire style. The two-storey hospital consists of a central administrative area with a tower, and operating theatre block flanked by long wings, with the men's wards on one side and women's on the other. Arcaded covered ways link the blocks and corner pavilions which are used for specific functions with octagonal operating theatres. Two storey arcaded verandahs run full length of the main facade. Construction is of brick with hipped iron roof and moulded string courses.

Constructed in Bathurst bricks; verandahs are decorated with timber posts, arched brackets and cast iron balustrades. The roofs are clad in iron sheeting. The architectural style is Federation Filigree.

== Heritage listing ==
Bathurst Hospital is an important late 19th-century public building well maintained and retaining original function. It embodies the principles of hospital design laid down by Florence Nightingale. It is a substantial building, located prominently on a corner, which makes a significant contribution to the townscape of Bathurst, expressing the wealth and optimism of late nineteenth century Bathurst.

"The history of the development of Bathurst Hospital demonstrates the overall development of health facilities in New South Wales, namely the end of the convict era, the changing commitments of the British Government and its declining support of the colony, the efforts of the citizens of Bathurst to build a new hospital to serve the growing population, medical developments through the period and social attitudes to the sick through the period. The hospital has associations with a range of noted individuals including Florence Nightingale, Lord Loftus, Governor of New South Wales who opened the building, the Hon, Ben Chifley, later Prime Minister of Australia who was Chairman of the hospital board for a number of years, children's illustrator Pixie O'Hare's and the local community who actively pursued its inception and facilitated further development on the site until the present day.

"Bathurst Hospital is a rare example of a designed hospital of outstanding architectural accomplishment, which in its overall concept and fine detailing makes a significant contribution to the series of outstanding public buildings in the town of Bathurst, reflecting late 19the century wealth and optimism. The hospital was designed by Sydney architect William Boles with the design approved by Florence Nightingale, a mid-19the century reformer of hospital sanitation methods and nursing pioneer. Later extensions were designed by various Government Architects, their staff and local architects. It is a landmark building in the town, with a distinctive roofscape, built on high land, which affords views to and from the building."

Bathurst District Hospital was listed on the New South Wales State Heritage Register on 2 April 1999.
