= John England (politician) =

Australian politician

John England CMG
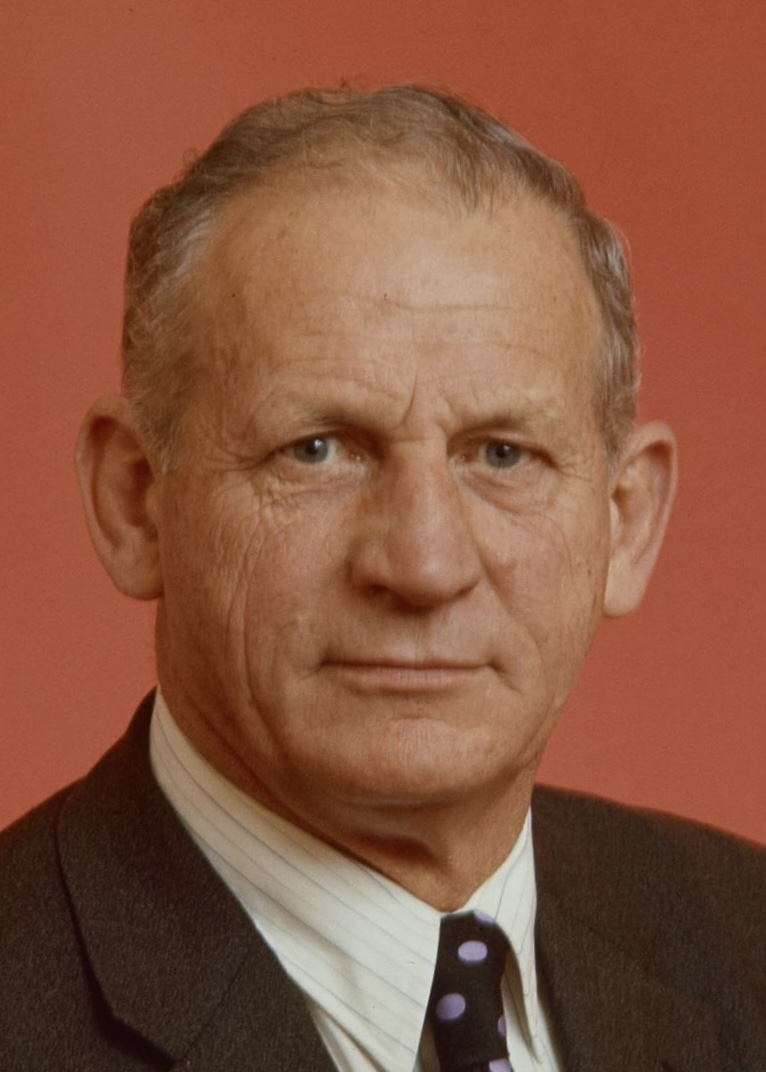

Administrator of the Northern Territory
- In office 1 June 1978 – 1 January 1981
- Preceded by: Jock Nelson
- Succeeded by: Eric Johnston

Member of the Australian Parliament for Calare
- In office 5 November 1960 – 11 November 1975
- Preceded by: John Howse
- Succeeded by: Sandy Mackenzie

Personal details
- Born: 12 October 1911 Clayfield, Queensland, Australia
- Died: 18 June 1985 (aged 73) Grenfell, New South Wales, Australia
- Party: Australian Country Party
- Spouse: Polly Wheatley (m. 1939)
- Occupation: Bank officer Farmer; Soldier

Military service
- Allegiance: Australia
- Branch/service: Citizen Military Forces; Second Australian Imperial Force
- Years of service: 1929–1946
- Rank: Lieutenant Colonel
- Commands: North East Borneo Force; 110th Light Anti-Aircraft Regiment; 52nd Composite Anti-Aircraft Regiment; 2/3rd Light Anti-Aircraft Regiment
- Battles/wars: Second World War
- Awards: Mentioned in Despatches

John Armstrong England, CMG (12 October 1911 – 18 June 1985) was an Australian politician, army officer and public servant. He was a member of the House of Representatives from 1960 to 1975, representing the seat of Calare for the National Country Party. He subsequently served as Administrator of the Northern Territory from 1976 to 1980.

== Early life ==
England was born on 12 October 1911 in Clayfield, Queensland. He was the third of five children born to Jane McLelland (née Fisher) and Sidney Willis England.

England was raised in Murwillumbah, New South Wales, attending the local public school and later boarding at Brisbane Boys' College. In 1928 he joined the Commercial Banking Company, initially working in Sydney and later in Forbes. He left banking in 1935 and the following year was appointed manager of Wilga, a sheep and wheat farm near Grenfell. He eventually acquired the property in 1947 upon his return from the Second World War.

== Military service ==
England joined the Militia in 1929 and was commissioned as an officer in 1931, serving with artillery and cavalry units. He was called up to full-time service in June 1941 and transferred to the Second Australian Imperial Force in August 1942. He was promoted to lieutenant-colonel in the same year and commanded several anti-aircraft regiments, including the 110th Light Anti-Aircraft Regiment, the 52nd Composite Anti-Aircraft Regiment and the 2/3rd Light Anti-Aircraft Regiment. England saw overseas service at Merauke in Netherlands New Guinea and in North Borneo. As commander of North East Borneo Force in October 1945 he received the surrender of Japanese troops. He transferred into the reserve of officers in February 1946 and was mentioned in despatches for his work in Borneo.

== Politics ==
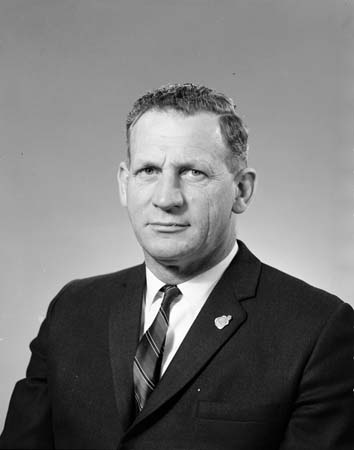
England in 1964

England was elected to the House of Representatives at the 1960 Calare by-election, winning the seat of Calare for the Country Party following the resignation of Liberal MP John Howse. His sizeable victory was reportedly a "shock" for the Liberal Party and followed the decision of the Democratic Labor Party to preference the Country Party ahead of the Liberals. He was re-elected on six occasions and retired prior to the 1975 federal election.

In parliament, England served on the Joint Standing Committee on Foreign Affairs (1962–1969), the Joint Standing Committee on the Australian Capital Territory (1962–1966) and the Joint Statutory Committee on Broadcasting of Parliamentary Proceedings (1973–1975). He was the Country Party's House whip from 1972 to 1975.

== Administrator of the Northern Territory ==
England was appointed Administrator of the Northern Territory on 1 June 1978 by the Fraser government. He dealt with a number of issues including Darwin's continued recovery from Cyclone Tracy and the transition to self-government under the Northern Territory (Self-Government) Act 1978. As administrator he was said to have "alleviated Darwin-Canberra tensions from behind the scenes" using his contacts in the federal government.

England retired as administrator in December 1980, having been appointed Companion of the Order of St Michael and St George in 1979.

== Personal life ==
In 1939, England married Polly Wheatley, with whom he had four children. After leaving the Northern Territory he retired to Grenfell, where he died on 18 June 1985, aged 73.

Parliament of Australia
Preceded by John Howse	Member for Calare; 1960–1975	Succeeded by Sandy Mackenzie
Government offices
Preceded by Jock Nelson	Administrator of the Northern Territory; 1978–1981	Succeeded by Eric Johnston
