= Neville Howse =

Australian Army officer, medical doctor and politician (1863–1930)

Major General The Honourable Sir Neville Howse VC, KCB, KCMG, FRCS
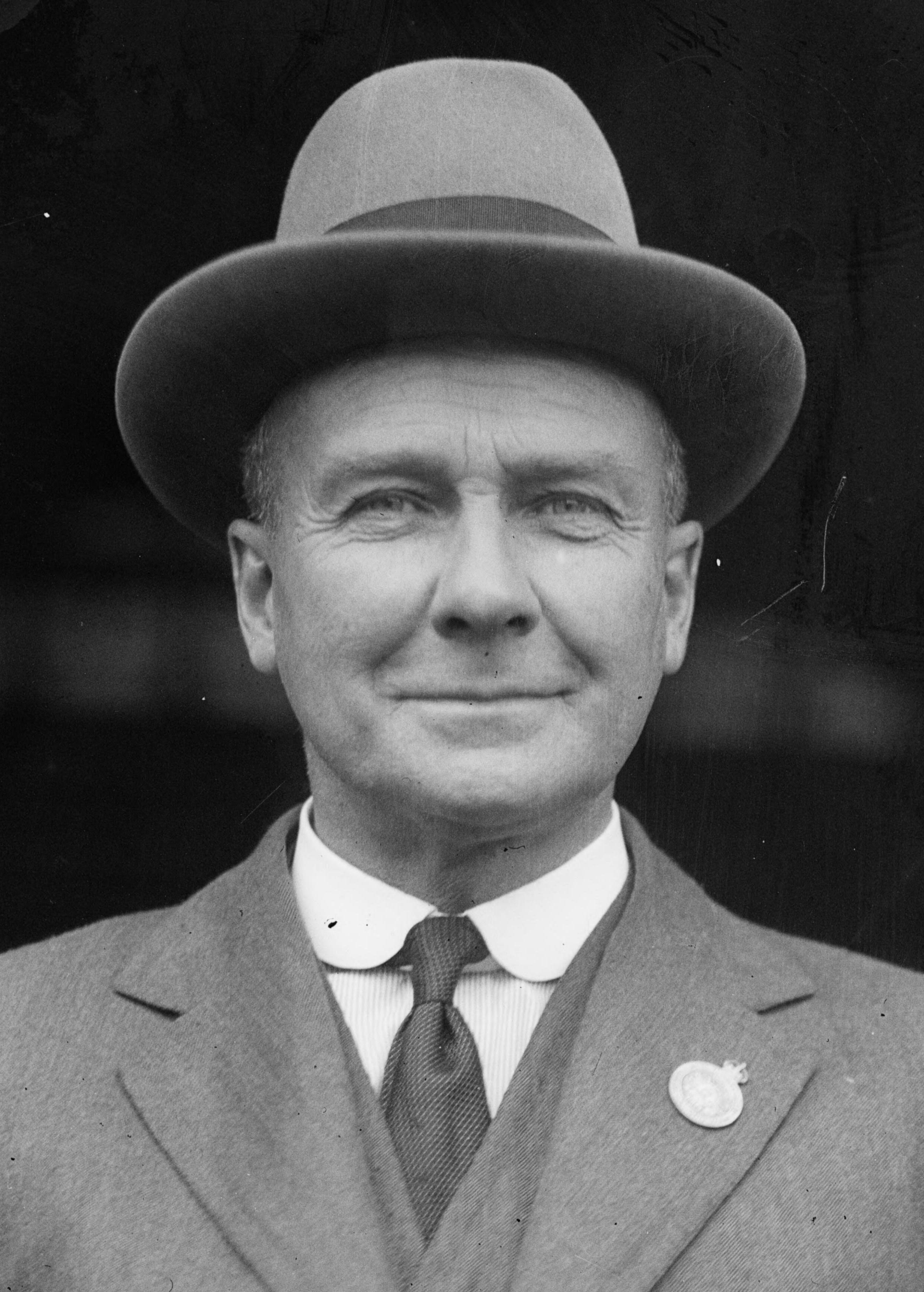

Minister for Defence
- In office 16 January 1925 – 2 April 1927
- Prime Minister: Stanley Bruce
- Preceded by: Eric Bowden
- Succeeded by: William Glasgow

Minister for Health
- In office 24 February 1928 – 22 October 1929
- Prime Minister: Stanley Bruce
- Preceded by: Stanley Bruce
- Succeeded by: Frank Anstey
- In office 16 January 1925 – 2 April 1927
- Prime Minister: Stanley Bruce
- Preceded by: Herbert Pratten
- Succeeded by: Stanley Bruce

Member of the Australian Parliament for Calare
- In office 16 December 1922 – 12 October 1929
- Preceded by: Thomas Lavelle
- Succeeded by: George Gibbons

Personal details
- Born: 26 October 1863 Stogursey, Somerset, England
- Died: 19 September 1930 (aged 66) London, England
- Resting place: Kensal Green Cemetery, London
- Party: Nationalist
- Spouse: Evelyn Pilcher (m. 1905)
- Children: Everil, Neville, Evelyn, John, Alison
- Occupation: Doctor, soldier, politician

Military service
- Allegiance: Australia
- Branch/service: Australian Army
- Years of service: 1900–22
- Rank: Major General
- Commands: Director General of Medical Services; Australian Army Medical Corps
- Battles/wars: Second Boer War; First World War; Asian and Pacific theatre; Gallipoli campaign; Western Front
- Awards: Victoria Cross; Knight Commander of the Order of the Bath; Knight Commander of the Order of St Michael and St George; Knight of the Order of Saint John; Mentioned in Despatches

Major General Sir Neville Reginald Howse, VC, KCB, KCMG, FRCS (26 October 1863 – 19 September 1930) was an Australian Army officer, medical doctor, and politician. He was the first Australian recipient of the Victoria Cross (VC), the highest decoration for gallantry "in the face of the enemy" that can be awarded to members of the British and Commonwealth armed forces.

Howse was born in Somerset, England, and followed his father into the medical profession. He emigrated to Australia in 1889 and eventually settled in Orange, New South Wales. During the Boer War, Howse served with the Australian medical corps. He was awarded the VC for his rescue of a wounded man at Vredefort in July 1900, while under heavy rifle fire. During the First World War, Howse served in New Guinea, Gallipoli, and on the Western Front. He oversaw the medical services of the Australian Imperial Force (AIF) and finished the war with the rank of major-general. He was elected to parliament in 1922, and was subsequently appointed to cabinet by Stanley Bruce. He served as Minister for Defence (1925–1927), Health (1925–1927; 1928–1929), and Home and Territories (1928).

== Early life ==
Howse was born in Stogursey, Somerset, England, the son of Lucy Elizabeth (née Conroy) and Alfred Howse. He was educated at Fullard's House School in Taunton. He chose to follow his father (a surgeon) into the medical profession, studying medicine at London Hospital. He attained the qualifications MRCS and LRCP in 1886, and subsequently became a demonstrator in anatomy at the University of Durham.

In 1889, Howse immigrated to Australia for health reasons. He initially settled in Newcastle, New South Wales, but later moved to Taree. He returned to England in 1895 for further studies, obtaining the rank of FRCS in 1897. He moved back to Australia in 1899 and bought a medical practice in Orange, which would remain his primary residence for the next 30 years except during his overseas military service.

== Military service ==
=== Boer War ===
Howse served in the Second Boer War with the Second Contingent of the New South Wales Army Medical Corps, Australian Forces, arriving at East London, Eastern Cape, in February 1900 as a lieutenant.

On 24 July 1900, during the action at Vredefort, South Africa, Howse saw a trumpeter fall, and went through very heavy cross-fire to rescue the man. His horse was soon shot from under him, but he continued on foot, reached the casualty, dressed his wound, and then carried him to safety. For this action, Howse was awarded the Victoria Cross. The award was gazetted on 4 June 1901 and the original citation reads:

The King has been graciously pleased to signify His intention to confer the decoration of the Victoria Cross on the undermentioned Officers, Non-Commissioned Officer, and Soldier, for their conspicuous bravery in South Africa, as stated against their names :—

New South Wales Medical Staff Corps, Captain N. R. House [sic]

During the action at Vredefort on 24 July 1900, Captain House went out under a heavy cross fire and picked up a wounded man, and carried him to a place of shelter.

He thus became the first recipient of the Victoria Cross serving in the Australian armed forces; his medal is on display at the Australian War Memorial in Canberra. Howse was subsequently promoted to captain on 15 October 1900.

The Second Contingent left South Africa via Cape Town on 13 December 1900 on the S.S. Orient, however Howse had been invalided to Britain on 28 November 1900. Howse subsequently returned to Australia at the end of February 1901. Following the gazetting of his VC, Howse was presented with the medal in a ceremony at Victoria Barracks, Sydney on 4 December 1901. Also at the ceremony were Captain A. Heathcote and Sergeant J. Paton, prior recipients of the VC for actions during the Indian Rebellion of 1857, who had subsequently migrated to New South Wales.

Howse returned to South Africa as a major with the Australian Army Medical Corps (AAMC) in command of the Bearer Company, arriving at Durban in Natal on 17 March 1902. Following service in Natal, Orange River Colony and Western Transvaal (attached to Colonel A.W. Thornycroft's Mounted Infantry Column), at the conclusion of the war he became seriously ill. He was again invalided to Britain on 6 July 1902, with the remainder of the AAMC contingent departing for Australia on 8 July 1902. Howse eventually returned to Australia in November 1902.

In 1905 Howse married Evelyn Pilcher in Bathurst, and was twice elected to serve as mayor of the City of Orange.

=== First World War ===
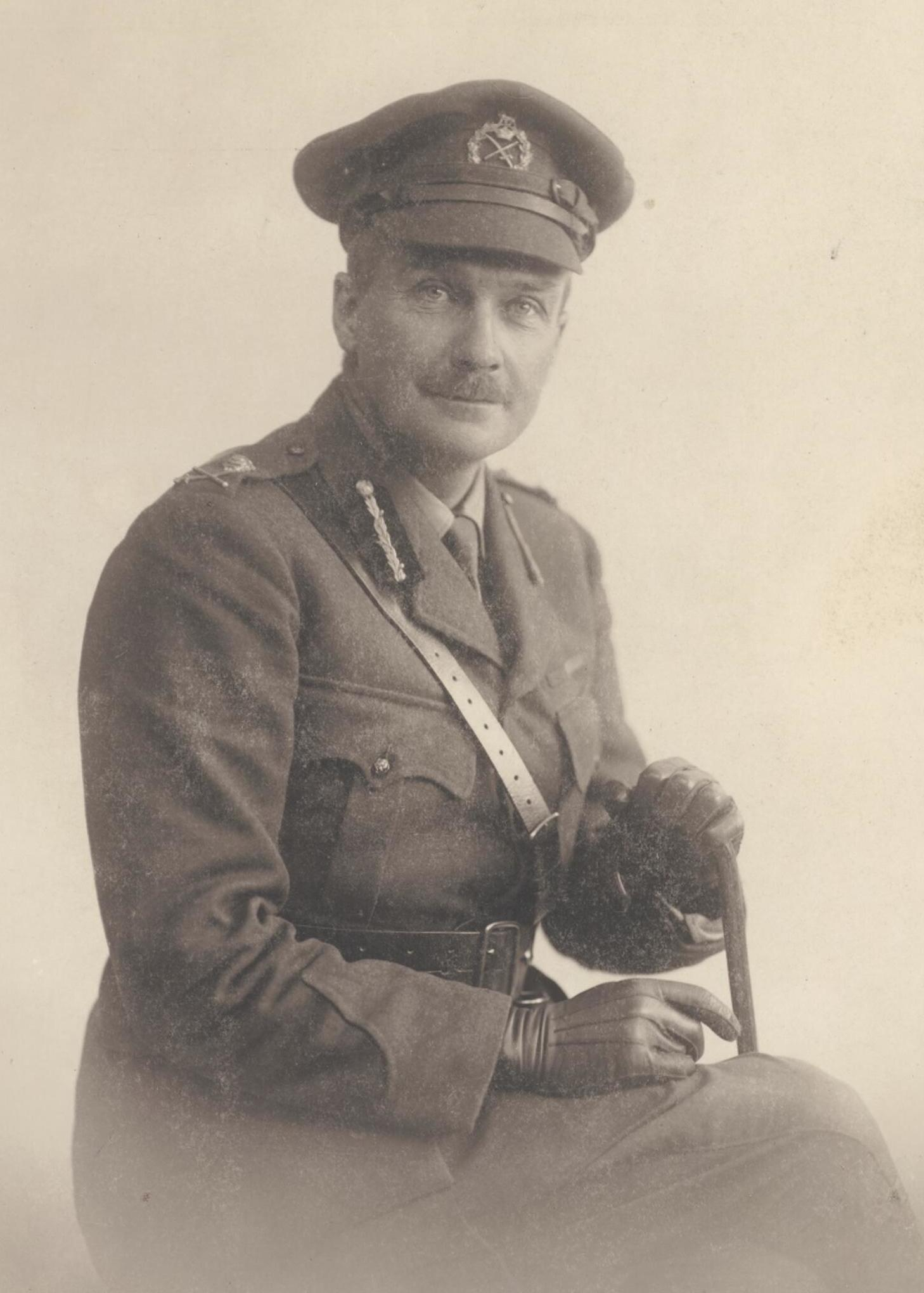
Portrait of Howse in uniform taken by a studio in Cairo

When the First World War began, Howse was appointed principal medical officer to the Australian Naval and Military Expeditionary Force to German New Guinea, with the rank of lieutenant colonel.

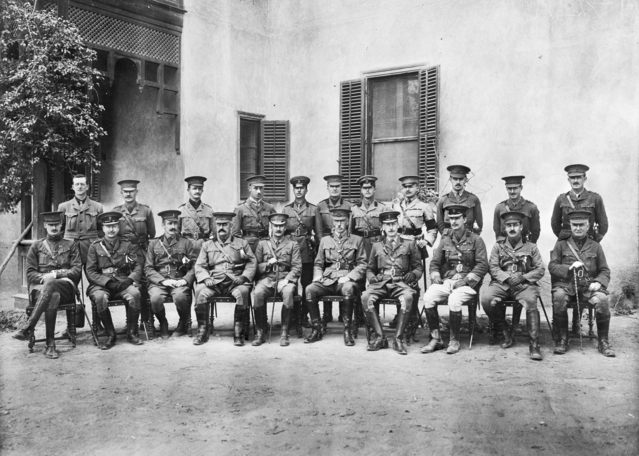
Group portrait of 1st Division staff officers at Mena Camp, December 1914. Howse, then a lieutenant colonel, is in the front row, fifth from the left.

Following his time in New Guinea, he was appointed Assistant Director of Medical Services 1st Australian Division. During the Gallipoli campaign he took charge of evacuating wounded men from the beach in the campaign’s opening days. In 1917 at the Dardanelles commission, he described the arrangements for dealing with wounded men at Gallipoli as inadequate to the point of 'criminal negligence'. He was Mentioned in Despatches for his service in this campaign.

In September 1915 he was given command of ANZAC medical services and in November became director of the AIF’s medical services, with the rank of surgeon-general. When the Australian Imperial Force moved to France, Howse took up a position in London, overseeing medical services in France, Egypt and Palestine. At the beginning of 1917 he was promoted to major general.

Howse was appointed a Companion of the Order of the Bath (CB) in the 1915 King's Birthday Honours, was promoted to Knight Commander of the Order of the Bath (KCB) on 22 January 1917, and appointed Knight of Grace of the Order of the Hospital of St John of Jerusalem and Knight Commander of the Order of St Michael and St George (KCMG) in 1919. From 1921 to 1925 he was Director-General of Medical Services.

== Politics ==
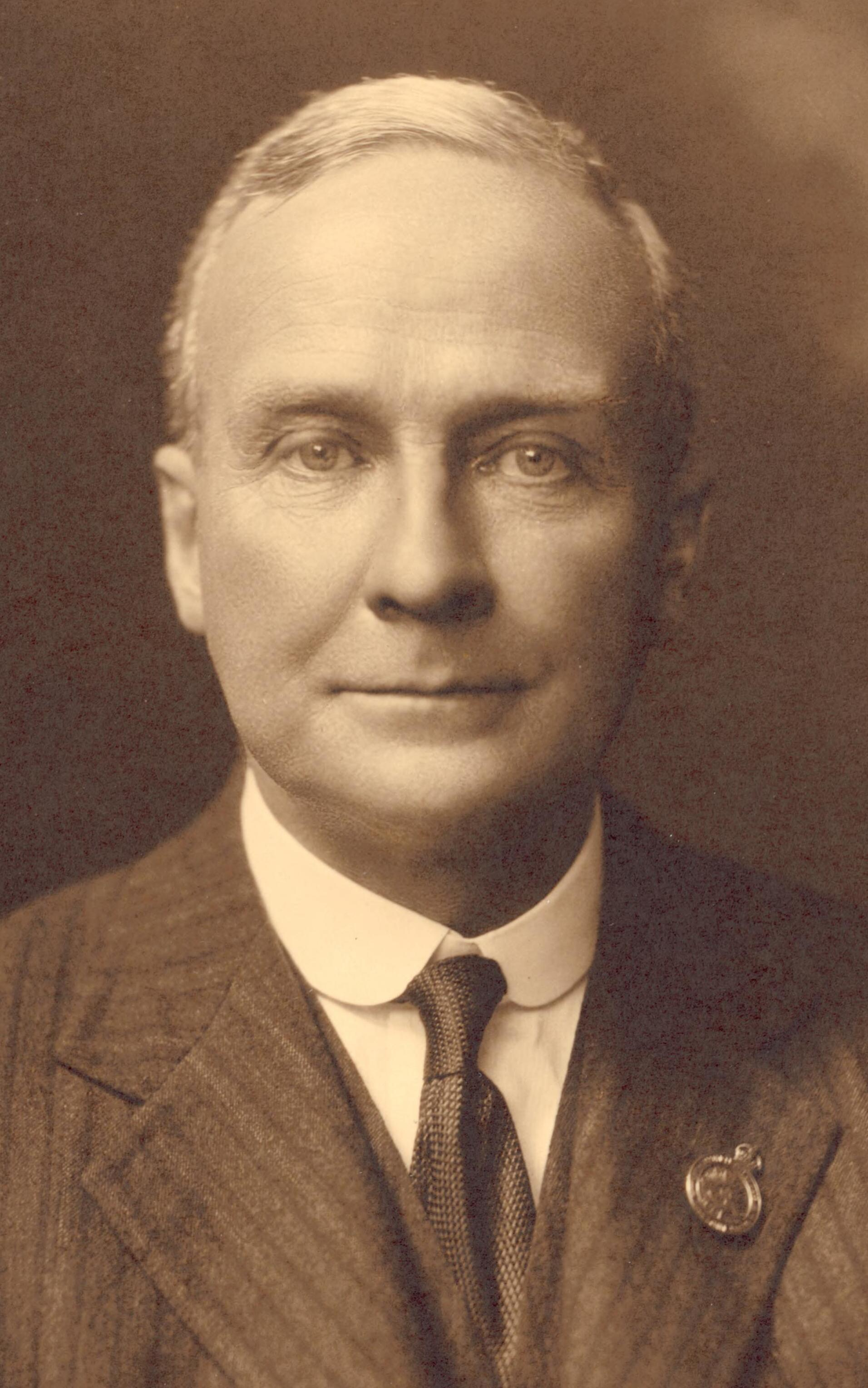
Undated photo, c. 1920s

In 1922, Howse resigned his army commission to enter politics, as regulations at the time forbade political campaigning by members of the regular army. He was elected to the House of Representatives, standing for the Nationalist Party in the Division of Calare. He subsequently represented Australia at the League of Nations Assembly in 1923. In January 1925, Howse was elevated to cabinet by Prime Minister Stanley Bruce as Minister for Defence and Minister for Health. In the defence portfolio his primary responsibility was for repatriation. He was a member of the Australian delegation to the 1926 Imperial Conference in London, but was taken ill and had to resign his portfolios in April 1927. He was kept on in the ministry as an honorary minister without portfolio.

In February 1928, Howse was reappointed Minister for Health and also made Minister for Home and Territories. He relinquished the latter portfolio in November 1928 after that year's election. Howse made a significant impact during his two periods as health minister. He helped establish the Federal Health Council of Australia, supported the formation of the Australian College of Surgeons and the first conference of Australian cancer organisations, and was instrumental in the decision to site the Australian Institute of Anatomy in Canberra. In 1928, he convinced cabinet to spend the considerable sum of £100,000 to establish one of the world's first radium banks, allowing Australia to become a centre of radiological research. He was also credited with inspiring public confidence in Commonwealth Serum Laboratories and the government's immunisation programs, at a time when a series of fatalities – including the Bundaberg tragedy of 1928 – had led to a distrust of immunisation among the general population.

Howse lost his seat in parliament in the Labor landslide at the 1929 election.

== Death and legacy ==
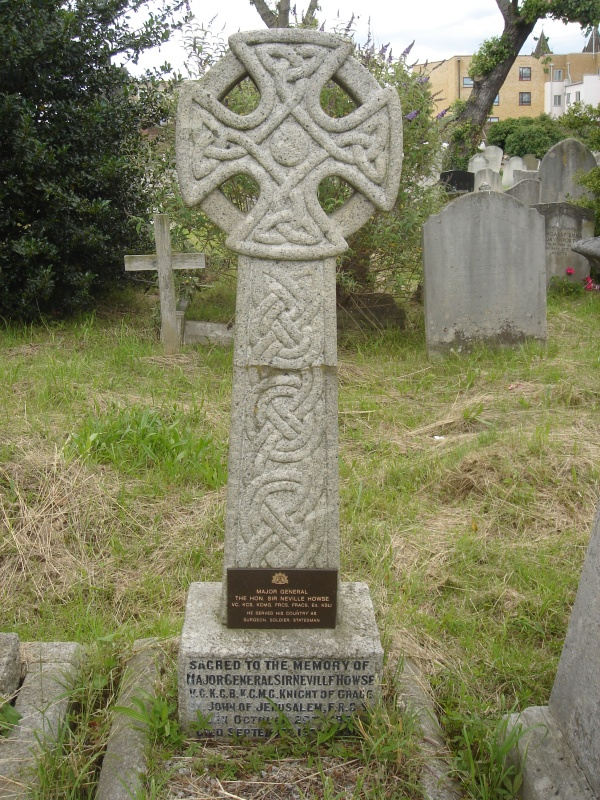
Howse's resting place in Kensal Green Cemetery

In February 1930, Howse travelled to England for medical treatment for cancer, but died on 19 September 1930, and is buried at Kensal Green Cemetery, London. His son, John Howse, was member for Calare from 1946 to 1960.

A statue by Peter Dornan depicting Howse's act of bravery is on display at the Royal Australasian College of Surgeons, Melbourne.

A postage stamp commemorating Howse was issued by Australia Post in 2000.

A one dollar coin designed by Wojciech Pietranik commemorating the centenary of Howse's feat of arms was issued by the Royal Australian Mint in 2000.

He was a freemason.

== Honours and awards ==

Ribbon	Description	Notes
	Victoria Cross (VC)	gazetted 1901
	Knight Commander of the Order of the Bath (KCB)	gazetted 1917
	Companion of the Order of the Bath (CB)	gazetted 1915
	Knight Commander of the Order of St Michael and St George (KCMG)	gazetted 1919
	Knight of Grace of the Order of St John	gazetted 1919
	Queen's South Africa Medal	with 6 clasps: CAPE COLONY, JOHANNESBURG, DIAMOND HILL, WINTERBERGEN, SOUTH AFRICA 1901 and SOUTH AFRICA 1902
	1914–15 Star	
	British War Medal	
	Victory Medal	with Oak Leaf for Mentioned in Despatches

== Notes ==
Political offices
Preceded by Eric Bowden	Minister for Defence; 1925–1927	Succeeded by William Glasgow
Preceded by Herbert Pratten	Minister for Health; 1925–1927	Succeeded by Stanley Bruce
Preceded by Stanley Bruce	Minister for Health; 1928–1929	Succeeded by Frank Anstey
Preceded by Charles Marr	Minister for Home and Territories; 1928	Succeeded by Aubrey Abbott
Parliament of Australia
Preceded by Thomas Lavelle	Member for Calare; 1922–1929	Succeeded by George Gibbons
