= Harold Thorby =

Australian politician

The Honourable Harold Thorby
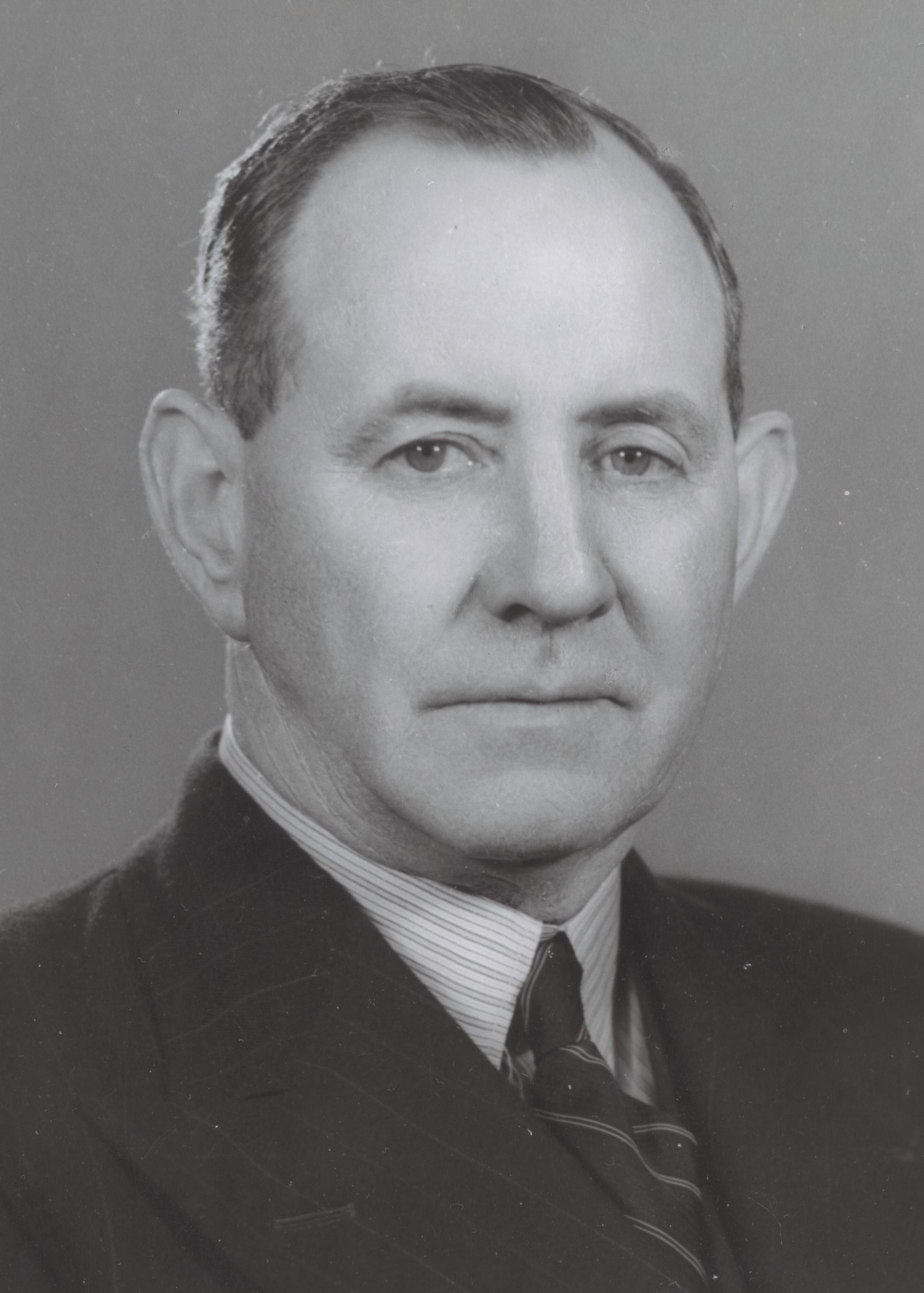

Deputy Leader of the Country Party
- In office 27 November 1937 – 15 October 1940
- Leader: Earle Page; Archie Cameron
- Preceded by: Thomas Paterson
- Succeeded by: Arthur Fadden

Member of the Australian Parliament for Calare
- In office 19 December 1931 – 21 September 1940
- Preceded by: George Gibbons
- Succeeded by: John Breen

Personal details
- Born: 2 October 1888 Annandale, New South Wales, Australia
- Died: 1 January 1973 (aged 84) Wahroonga, New South Wales, Australia
- Party: Country
- Spouses: Vera Morley (m. 1916–1958) Alfred Smith (m. 1960)
- Children: Two daughters
- Occupation: Grazier

Harold Victor Campbell Thorby (2 October 1888 – 1 January 1973) was an Australian politician. He was a member of the Country Party and served as the party's deputy leader from 1937 to 1940. He represented the Division of Calare (1931–1940) and held ministerial office as Minister for War Service Homes (1934–1936), Defence (1937–1938), Civil Aviation (1938–1939), Health (1940), and Postmaster-General (1940). He lost his seat at the 1940 federal election.

== Early life ==
Thorby was born on 2 October 1888 in Annandale, Sydney, New South Wales. He was the son of Elizabeth (née Campbell) and Frederick James Thorby; his mother was Irish and his father English. Thorby grew up with his maternal grandparents in Geurie and attended the local public school before going on to Sydney Grammar School. He later acquired his own property in Geurie and studied woolclassing, veterinary science and architecture through Sydney Technical College. He also worked as a construction foreman for his father, whose firm had projects in Sydney and Newcastle. In 1916, he married Vera Lynda Morley and they had two daughters.

== State politics ==
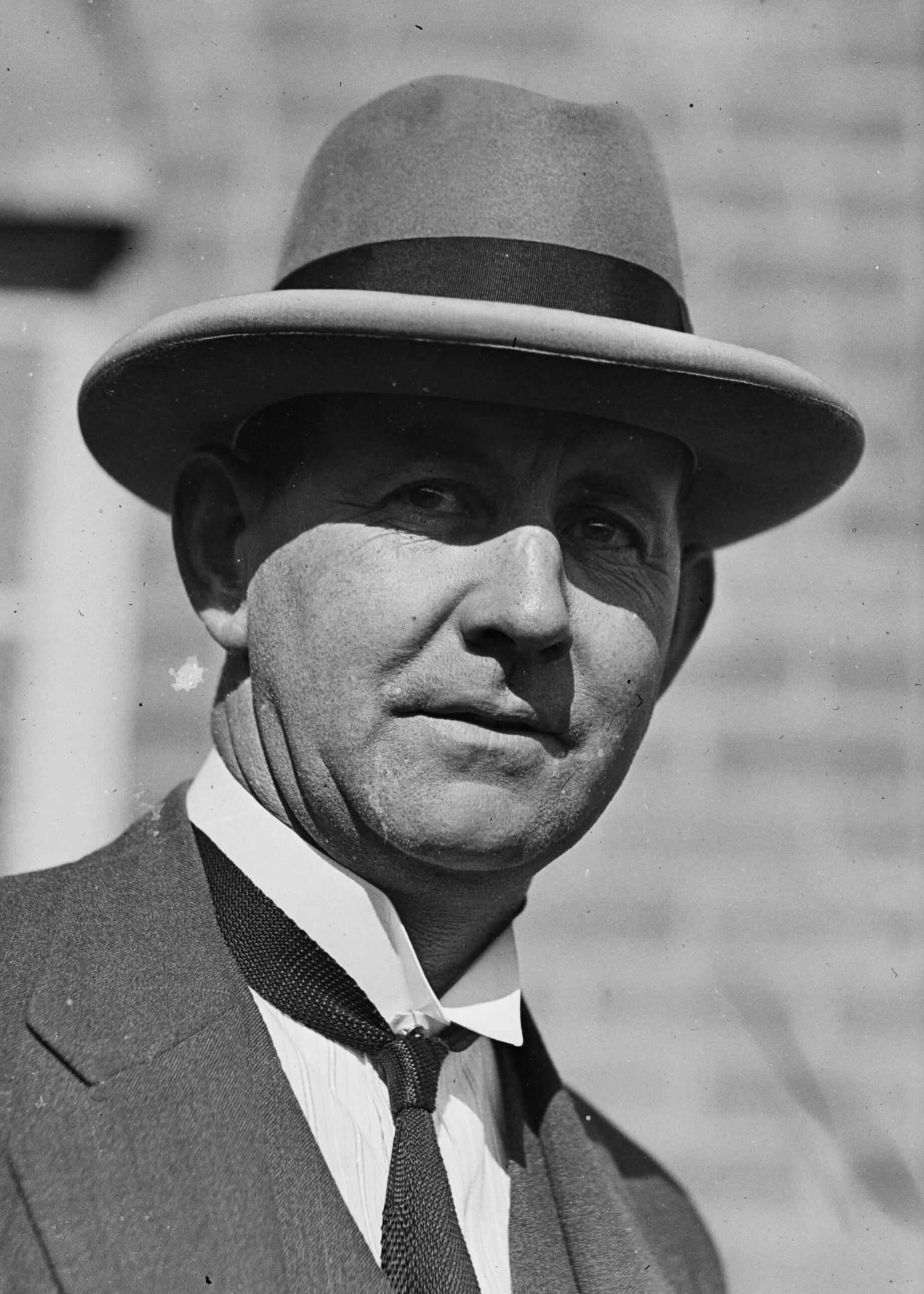
Thorby in 1930

Thorby was a member of the three-member electoral district of Wammerawa in the NSW Legislative Assembly from 1922 to 1927 for the Country Party. After its division into single-member electorates in 1927 he represented Castlereagh for one term to 1930 until his defeat by Joseph Alfred Clark of the Labor Party. He was the Minister for Agriculture and chairman of the Water Conservation and Irrigation Commission in the government of Thomas Bavin from 1927 to 1930, during which construction of the Wyangala Dam commenced, the Burrinjuck Dam was finished and the Hawkesbury Agricultural College was enlarged.

== Federal politics ==
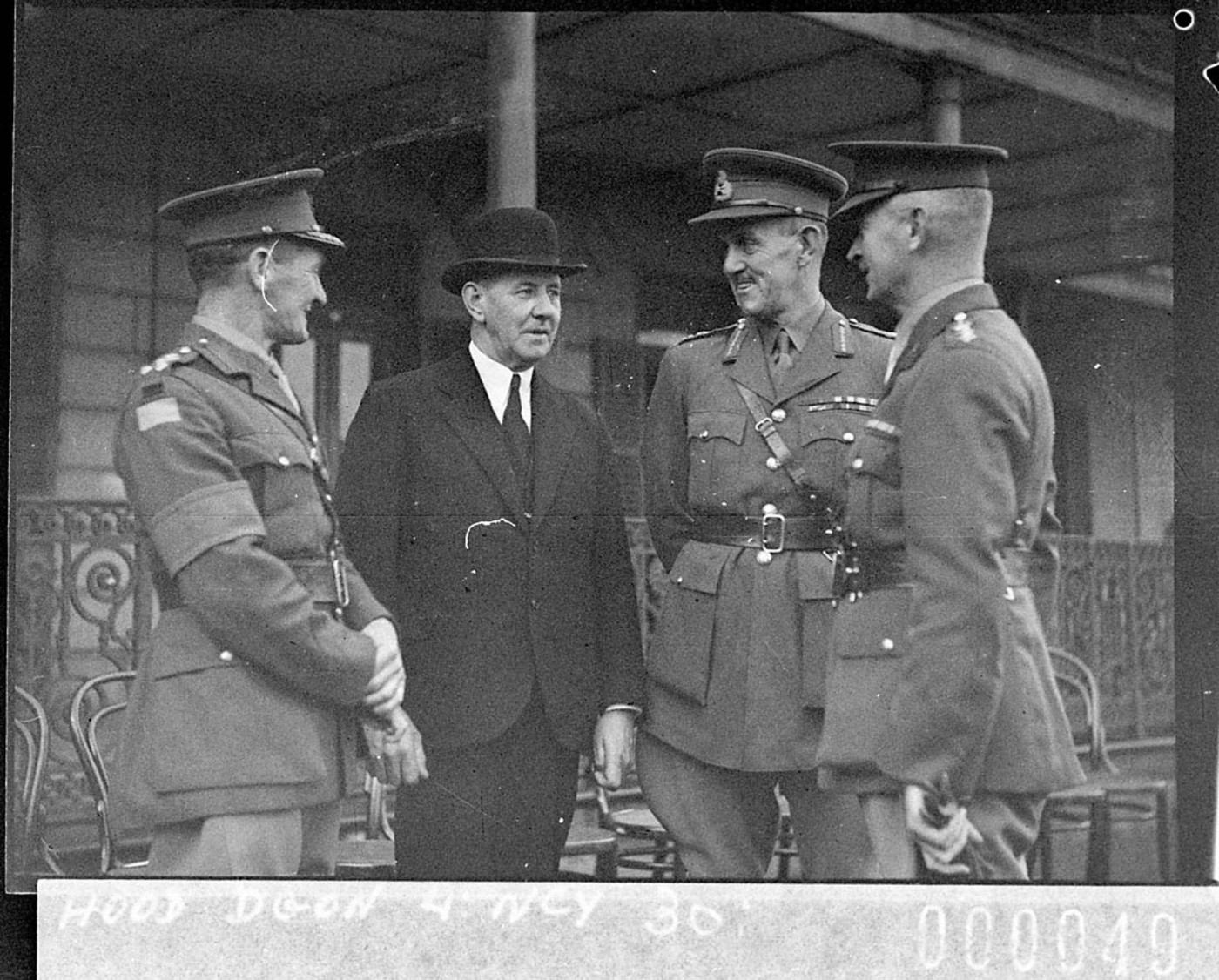
Thorby as defence minister speaking with senior army officers

At the 1931 general election, Thorby won the federal seat of Calare, which he held until 1940. He was a Minister without Portfolio from November 1934 to November 1937 in the Lyons government, entitled Assistant Minister for Repatriation (1934–35), Minister for War Service Homes (1935–36) and Assistant Minister for Commerce (1935–37). In November 1937, Thorby was elected deputy leader of the Country Party, defeating John McEwen by a single vote on the second ballot. He subsequently served as Minister for Defence from November 1937 to November 1938 and Minister for Works and Minister for Civil Aviation from November 1938. During this period he initiated a program of adding annexes to existing factories to accelerate armaments production, but this program failed to spend even budgeted funds. In April 1939, he left the ministry when the Country Party refused to take part in the Menzies government. With the formation of a coalition government in March 1940, Thorby became Minister for Health and Postmaster-General.

== Later years ==
After his defeat at the 1940 election by Labor's John Breen, Thorby ran unsuccessfully for the state seat of Dubbo at the 1941 by-election and the federal seat of Calare at the 1943 and 1946 elections. He returned to farming on his wife's parents property at Wongarbon and remained active in the Graziers' Association and the Country Party. Thorby's first wife died in 1958 and he married Alfreda Rogers Smith in 1960. He died at his home in the Sydney suburb of Wahroonga, survived by two daughters from his first marriage.

Political offices
Preceded by Josiah Francis	Minister for War Service Homes; 1934–1936	Succeeded by James Hunter
Preceded by Joseph Lyons	Minister for Defence; 1937–1938	Succeeded by Geoffrey Street
New title	Minister for Civil Aviation; 1938–1939	Succeeded by James Fairbairn
Preceded by Frederick Stewart	Minister for Health; 1940	Succeeded by Frederick Stewart
Preceded by Eric Harrison	Postmaster-General; 1940	Succeeded by Thomas Collins
New South Wales Legislative Assembly
Preceded by Joseph Clark	Member for Wammerawa; 1922–1927; Served alongside: Ashford/Clark, Bill Dunn	Abolished
New title	Member for Castlereagh; 1927–1930	Succeeded by Joseph Clark
Parliament of Australia
Preceded by George Gibbons	Member for Calare; 1931–1940	Succeeded by John Breen
Party political offices
Preceded by Thomas Paterson	Deputy Leader of the Country Party of Australia; 1937–1940	Succeeded by Arthur Fadden
