= Henry Pigott =

Australian politician

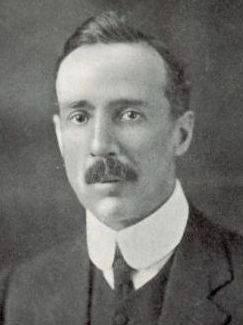

Member of the Australian Parliament for Calare
- In office 31 May 1913 – 13 December 1919
- Preceded by: Thomas Brown
- Succeeded by: Thomas Lavelle

Personal details
- Born: 2 October 1866 Ceylon
- Died: 8 July 1949 (aged 82) Manly, New South Wales, Australia
- Party: Liberal (1913–17); Nationalist (1917–1919)
- Occupation: Bank officer, agent

Henry Robert Maguire Pigott (2 October 1866 – 8 July 1949) was an Australian politician. He was a member of the Australian House of Representatives from 1913 to 1919, representing the electorate of Calare for the Commonwealth Liberal Party and its successor the Nationalist Party.

He was born in Ceylon of Irish Baptist missionary parents and attended the London School for the Sons of Missionaries. He worked for the Bank of Australasia in England before migrating to New South Wales in 1885. He worked as an official for the Australian Joint Stock Bank in a succession of branches: as an accountant at Summer Hill and then Cooma and then bank manager at Milton and finally Blayney. In 1899, he left the banking industry and became a stock and station agent in Blayney, in which capacity he continued up until his election to parliament. He also purchased a 13,000 acre pastoral property, "Cadara", near Tottenham, in 1910. He was an elected member of the council of the Liberal Association of New South Wales

In 1913, he was elected to the Australian House of Representatives for the Commonwealth Liberal Party, defeating Labour member for Calare Thomas Brown. He held the seat until 1919 (during which time the Liberal Party had become the Nationalist Party), when he was defeated by Labor's Thomas Lavelle. An attempt to regain the seat as a member of the newly formed Country Party in 1922 was unsuccessful.

After his parliamentary defeat, Pigott resided in Blayney while retaining the successful "Cadara" property. He remained active in farming circles, serving as a representative of the Carcoar and Mandurama branch of the Graziers' Association for over twenty years and remaining involved in the Farmers and Settlers Association. He sold "Cadara" in 1945 and purchased a bungalow in the Sydney suburb of Manly, which he lived in thereafter. He died at his Manly home in 1949.

Parliament of Australia
Preceded by Thomas Brown	Member for Calare; 1913–1919	Succeeded by Thomas Lavelle
