= Division of Calare =

Australian federal electoral division

Coordinates: 33.306°S 148.922°E

Calare Australian House of Representatives Division
- Interactive map of electorate boundaries from the 2025 federal election
- Created: 1906
- MP: Andrew Gee
- Party: Independent
- Namesake: Wiradjuri name for the Lachlan River
- Electors: 124,743 (2025)
- Area: 32,648 km^{2} (12,605.5 sq mi)
- Demographic: Rural
Electorates around Calare:
Parkes	Parkes	New England
Parkes	Calare	Hunter; Macquarie
Riverina	Riverina	Hume

The Division of Calare (/kəˈlɛər/ kə-LAIR or /kəˈlɑːri/ kə-LAR-ee) is an Australian electoral division in the state of New South Wales.

The division covers the state's Central West (west of the Blue Mountains), and has always included the regional city of Orange within its boundaries since 1913.

== Geography ==
Since 1984, federal electoral division boundaries in Australia have been determined at redistributions by a redistribution committee appointed by the Australian Electoral Commission. Redistributions occur for the boundaries of divisions in a particular state, and they occur every seven years, or sooner if a state's representation entitlement changes or when divisions of a state are malapportioned.

The division has always been located in the state's Central West since the division was created in 1906. At the time, it replaced the abolished divisions of Canobolas and Bland. Canobolas formed the northern three-quarters of the new division, while the southern one-quarter was formed from parts of Bland. At the time, the new division covered Forbes and Parkes, and stopped short of Wellington, Dubbo and Orange.

In 1913, it lost the former Bland areas in the south to the divisions of Riverina and Werriwa. However, it also gained Wellington and Orange from the divisions of Robertson and Macquarie respectively. From then until 1977, the division has roughly covered a similar area that included Parkes, Forbes and Orange, with some gains and losses during redistributions. It briefly included Mudgee between 1968 and 1977.

The division's first significant change to its boundaries was in 1977, when it was massively expanded eastwards to include Bathurst and Lithgow. It also lost Forbes which it had covered since the creation of the division. The division had another significant change to its boundaries in 1984, when the division lost its western half west of Orange, including Parkes which it had also covered since the creation of the division. It also lost areas south of Bathurst. Instead, the division gained areas to the north, including Mudgee which it lost seven years prior. In 1992, the division lost these northern gains, and regained areas west of Orange and south of Bathurst.

In 2006, the division had another significant change to its boundaries. It was massively expanded to the west and north up to the Queensland boundary, onto areas previously covered by the divisions of Parkes and Gwydir (abolished). The expansion made Calare New South Wales's largest electorate. It had regained Parkes and Forbes, but also lost Bathurst and Lithgow at the same time. This expansion was short-lived and was mostly reversed in 2009, with most of these areas ceded back to the Division of Parkes. Calare managed to retain Parkes and Forbes, and also regained Bathurst and Lithgow. In 2016, the division regained areas to the north such as Wellington and Mudgee, and lost areas to the west again such as Parkes and Forbes. It did not undergo a boundary change in the 2024 redistribution.

Since 2016, the division covers the entirety of the local government areas of Bathurst Regional Council, Blayney Shire, Cabonne Council, City of Lithgow, Mid-Western Regional Council, Oberon Council and City of Orange, as well as the southern part of Dubbo Regional Council. It stretches from Mudgee, Gulgong, Wellington in the north-west, to Orange, Bathurst, Lithgow and Oberon in the south-east and Canowindra in the south-west.

The division has always included Orange within its boundaries since 1913. Despite coming close to Dubbo, especially between 1934 and 1948 when the division was at the edge of Dubbo, it had never included Dubbo in its boundaries throughout the division's history.

== History ==
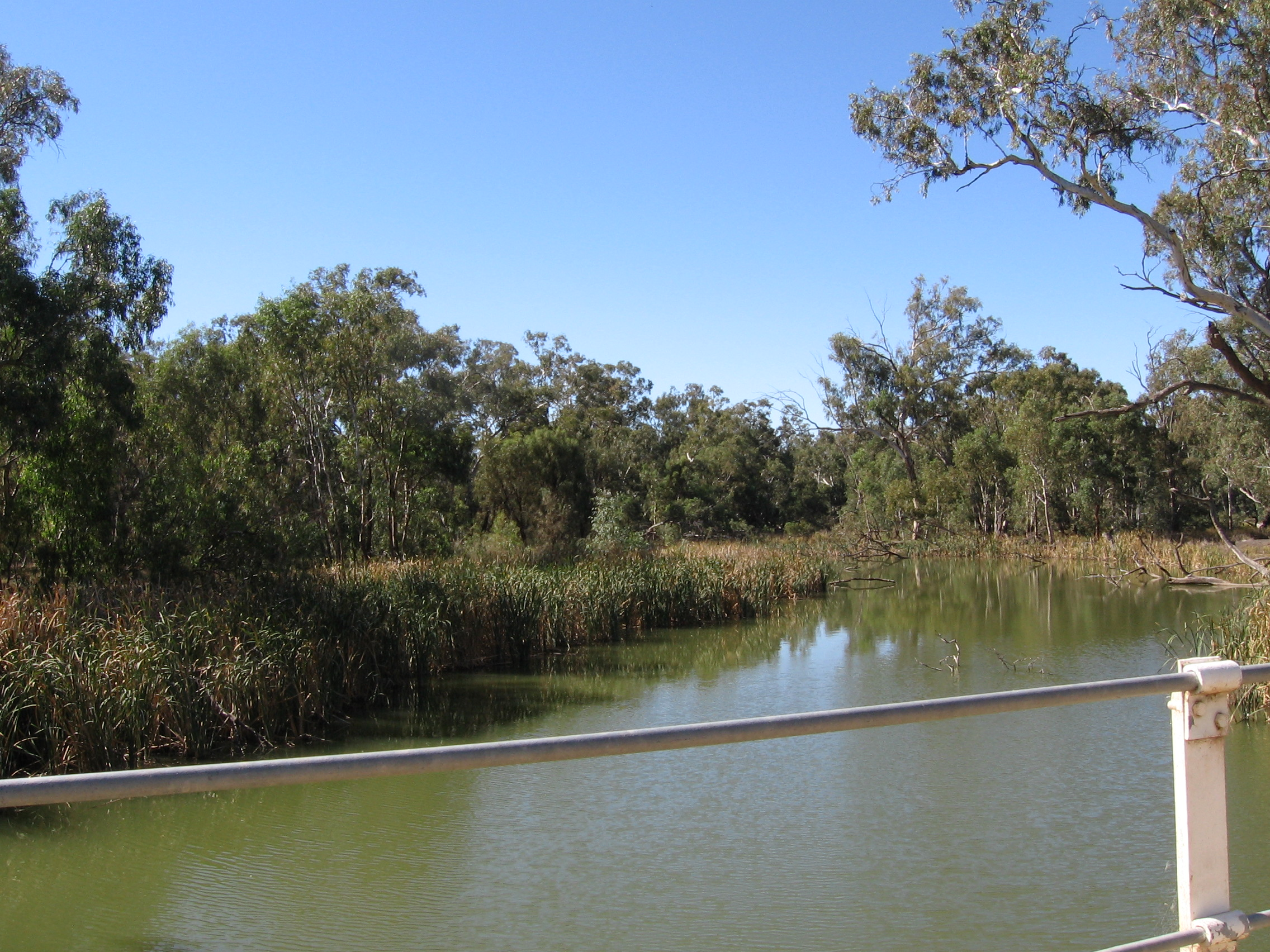
The Lachlan River, the Aboriginal name of which is the division's namesake

The division was first contested at the 1906 election, created to replace the abolished Division of Canobolas, and to a smaller extent, the abolished Division of Bland. The division is named for the local Aboriginal name for the Lachlan River, which runs through the western part of the division. The Aboriginal name is pronounced Kal-ah-ree, but the pronunciation Kul-air is established for the division.

The division originally encompassed Forbes and Parkes. Subsequent boundary changes moved it eastwards to encompass Orange, Bathurst, Lithgow and Oberon. On these boundaries it was notionally a marginal seat between the Australian Labor Party (which held it 1983–96) and the National Party, but it was held comfortably by an independent, Peter Andren, from 1996 to 2007. Andren was not a candidate for the 2007 election: he intended to run for a Senate seat but was diagnosed with cancer in 2007 and died during the election campaign.

A redistribution in 2006 moved the boundaries west to take in Cowra, Grenfell and the vast north-west of New South Wales from Brewarrina to Menindee, making Calare New South Wales's largest electorate. Lithgow, Bathurst and Oberon, which tend to favour Labor, were transferred to the neighbouring seat of Macquarie. At the 2007 federal election, Calare was won by the Nationals' representative John Cobb on a margin of 12.1 percent. Cobb had previously represented the Division of Parkes, parts of which were redistributed into Calare in 2006.

The 2009 redistribution of NSW moved the boundaries back east, to again include Lithgow, Bathurst and Oberon. Most of the northwestern area of the division was transferred to the neighbouring Division of Parkes. The changes took effect at the 2010 election.

The current Member for Calare since the 2016 federal election is Andrew Gee, who was originally elected as a member of the National Party, but was later re-elected as an independent member in the 2025 election.

== Members ==
Image	Member	Party	Term	Notes
	Thomas Brown (1861–1934)	Labor	12 December 1906 – 31 May 1913	Previously held the Division of Canobolas. Lost seat. Later elected to the New South Wales Legislative Assembly seat of Lachlan in 1913
	Henry Pigott (1866–1949)	Liberal	31 May 1913 – 17 February 1917	Lost seat
	Henry Pigott (1866–1949)	Nationalist	17 February 1917 – 13 December 1919	Lost seat
	Thomas Lavelle (1887–1944)	Labor	13 December 1919 – 16 December 1922	Lost seat
	Sir Neville Howse (1863–1930)	Nationalist	16 December 1922 – 12 October 1929	Served as minister under Bruce. Lost seat. Son was John Howse
	George Gibbons (1887–1954)	Labor	12 October 1929 – 19 December 1931	Lost seat
	Harold Thorby (1888–1973)	Country	19 December 1931 – 21 September 1940	Previously held the New South Wales Legislative Assembly seat of Castlereagh. Served as minister under Lyons, Page and Menzies. Lost seat
	John Breen (1898–1966)	Labor	21 September 1940 – 28 September 1946	Lost seat
	John Howse (1913–2002)	Liberal	28 September 1946 – 28 September 1960	Resigned to retire from politics. Father was Sir Neville Howse
	John England (1911–1985)	Country	5 November 1960 – 2 May 1975	Retired
	John England (1911–1985)	National Country	2 May 1975 – 11 November 1975	Retired
	Sandy Mackenzie (1941–)	National Country	13 December 1975 – 16 October 1982	Lost seat
	Sandy Mackenzie (1941–)	Nationals	16 October 1982 – 5 March 1983	Lost seat
	David Simmons (1947–)	Labor	5 March 1983 – 29 January 1996	Served as minister under Hawke and Keating. Retired
	Peter Andren (1946–2007)	Independent	2 March 1996 – 17 October 2007	Retired
	John Cobb (1950–)	Nationals	24 November 2007 – 9 May 2016	Previously held the Division of Parkes. Retired
	Andrew Gee (1968–)	Nationals	2 July 2016 – 23 December 2022	Previously held the New South Wales Legislative Assembly seat of Orange. Served as minister under Morrison. Incumbent
	Andrew Gee (1968–)	Independent	23 December 2022 – present	Previously held the New South Wales Legislative Assembly seat of Orange. Served as minister under Morrison. Incumbent

== Election results ==
2025 Australian federal election: Calare
Party	Candidate	Votes	%	±%
National	Sam Farraway	31,577	29.71	−17.96
Independent	Andrew Gee	25,172	23.69	+23.69
Independent	Kate Hook	16,756	15.77	−4.63
Labor	Julie Cunningham	11,086	10.43	−4.71
One Nation	Jennifer Hughes	8,200	7.72	−0.72
Legalise Cannabis	Sue Raye	4,162	3.92	+3.92
Greens	Ben Parker	3,753	3.53	−1.03
Shooters, Fishers, Farmers	Jase Lesage	2,245	2.11	+2.11
Family First	Ross Hazelton	1,733	1.63	+1.63
Trumpet of Patriots	Vicki O'Leary	1,583	1.49	+1.49
Total formal votes		106,267	91.98	−4.03
Informal votes		9,271	8.02	+4.03
Turnout		115,538	92.68	+2.65
Notional two-party-preferred count
National	Sam Farraway	66,158	62.26	−3.19
Labor	Julie Cunningham	40,109	37.74	+3.19
Two-candidate-preferred result
Independent	Andrew Gee	60,338	56.78	+56.78
National	Sam Farraway	45,929	43.22	−16.46
Member changed to Independent from National				
