= John Howse =

Australian politician (1913–2002)

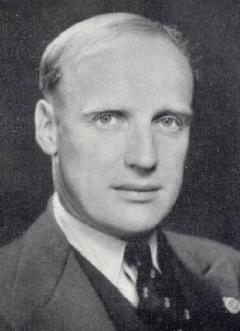

Member of the Australian Parliament for Calare
- In office 28 September 1946 – 28 September 1960
- Preceded by: John Breen
- Succeeded by: John England

Personal details
- Born: 10 October 1913 Orange, New South Wales
- Died: 11 July 2002 (aged 88) Canberra, Australia
- Party: Liberal Party of Australia
- Relations: Neville Howse (father)
- Education: University of Sydney
- Occupation: Company director

Military service
- Allegiance: Australia
- Branch/service: Royal Australian Navy
- Years of service: 1939–1946
- Rank: Lieutenant

John Brooke Howse (10 October 1913 – 11 July 2002) was an Australian politician. He was born in Orange, New South Wales, the son of Sir Neville Howse, a minister in the Nationalist government of Stanley Bruce. He attended Geelong Grammar School and the University of Sydney before becoming a company director. He underwent military service 1939–46; on his return, he was elected to the Australian House of Representatives for the Liberal Party, defeating Labor's John Breen for his father's old seat of Calare. He held the seat until he resigned on 28 September 1960, becoming a manager and company director. He died in 2002.

Parliament of Australia
Preceded by John Breen	Member for Calare; 1946–1960	Succeeded by John England
