= Electoral results for the Division of Corio =

Australian division election results

This is a list of electoral results for the Division of Corio in Australian federal elections from the division's creation in 1901 until the present.

== Members ==
Member	Party	Term
Richard Crouch	Protectionist	1901–1909
Richard Crouch	Liberal	1909–1910
Alfred Ozanne	Labor	1910–1913
William Kendell	Liberal	1913–1914
Alfred Ozanne	Labor	1914–1917
John Lister	Nationalist	1917–1929
Arthur Lewis	Labor	1929–1931
Richard Casey	United Australia	1931–1940
John Dedman	Labor	1940–1949
Hubert Opperman	Liberal	1949–1967
Gordon Scholes	Labor	1967–1993
Gavan O'Connor	Labor	1993–2007
Gavan O'Connor	Independent	2007–2007
Richard Marles	Labor	2007–present

== Election results ==
=== Elections in the 2020s ===
==== 2025 ====
2025 Australian federal election: Corio
Party	Candidate	Votes	%	±%
One Nation	Adam Helman			
Socialist Alliance	Sarah Hathway			
Independent	John De Lorenzo			
Greens	Emilie Flynn			
Liberal	Darren Buller			
Labor	Richard Marles			
Total formal votes				
Informal votes				
Turnout				

==== 2022 ====
2022 Australian federal election: Corio
Party	Candidate	Votes	%	±%
Labor	Richard Marles	40,846	42.13	−5.47
Liberal	Manish Patel	23,822	24.57	−9.28
Greens	Simon Northeast	14,450	14.91	+1.84
United Australia	Shane Murdock	4,781	4.93	−0.55
One Nation	Robert Jones	3,788	3.91	+3.91
Liberal Democrats	Max Payne	3,383	3.49	+3.49
Socialist Alliance	Sue Bull	2,444	2.52	+2.52
Animal Justice	Naomi Adams	2,350	2.42	+2.42
Federation	Jessica Taylor	1,080	1.11	+1.11
Total formal votes		96,944	94.78	−1.66
Informal votes		5,341	5.22	+1.66
Turnout		102,285	90.91	−2.97
Two-party-preferred result
Labor	Richard Marles	60,919	62.84	+2.52
Liberal	Manish Patel	36,025	37.16	−2.52
Labor hold		Swing	+2.52	

Alluvial diagram for preference flows in the seat of Corio in the 2022 federal election. indicates at what stage the winning candidate had over 50% of the votes and was declared the winner.

=== Elections in the 2010s ===
==== 2019 ====
2019 Australian federal election: Corio
Party	Candidate	Votes	%	±%
Labor	Richard Marles	47,010	47.60	+4.18
Liberal	Alastair Thomson	33,426	33.85	−2.78
Greens	Amber Forbes	12,902	13.07	+1.38
United Australia	Desmond Sanborn	5,414	5.48	+5.48
Total formal votes		98,752	96.44	+1.10
Informal votes		3,648	3.56	−1.10
Turnout		102,400	92.83	+0.70
Two-party-preferred result
Labor	Richard Marles	59,572	60.32	+2.12
Liberal	Alastair Thomson	39,180	39.68	−2.12
Labor hold		Swing	+2.12	

==== 2016 ====
2016 Australian federal election: Corio
Party	Candidate	Votes	%	±%
Labor	Richard Marles	43,087	45.63	+2.12
Liberal	Richard Lange	33,180	35.14	−0.06
Greens	Sarah Mansfield	11,112	11.77	+4.46
Animal Justice	Jamie Overend	2,948	3.12	+3.12
Rise Up Australia	Ash Puvimanasinghe	1,869	1.98	+1.58
Bullet Train	Jeff Moran	1,138	1.21	+1.21
Socialist Alliance	Sue Bull	1,101	1.17	+0.42
Total formal votes		94,435	95.39	+0.69
Informal votes		4,561	4.61	−0.69
Turnout		98,996	91.83	−2.33
Two-party-preferred result
Labor	Richard Marles	56,656	59.99	+2.24
Liberal	Richard Lange	37,779	40.01	−2.24
Labor hold		Swing	+2.24	

==== 2013 ====
2013 Australian federal election: Corio
Party	Candidate	Votes	%	±%
Labor	Richard Marles	39,267	43.51	−7.44
Liberal	Peter Read	31,768	35.20	+3.31
Greens	Greg Lacey	6,593	7.31	−5.06
Palmer United	Anthony Harrington	5,122	5.68	+5.68
Sex Party	Justine Martin	2,492	2.76	+2.76
Independent	Stephanie Asher	1,958	2.17	+2.17
Family First	Brendan Fenn	1,461	1.62	−1.94
Socialist Alliance	Sue Bull	679	0.75	−0.35
Christians	Patrick Atherton	549	0.61	+0.61
Rise Up Australia	Yann Legrand	364	0.40	+0.40
Total formal votes		90,253	94.70	−0.84
Informal votes		5,049	5.30	+0.84
Turnout		95,302	94.21	+0.13
Two-party-preferred result
Labor	Richard Marles	52,117	57.75	−5.72
Liberal	Peter Read	38,136	42.25	+5.72
Labor hold		Swing	−5.72	

==== 2010 ====
2010 Australian federal election: Corio
Party	Candidate	Votes	%	±%
Labor	Richard Marles	42,578	51.51	+6.02
Liberal	Don Gibson	25,729	31.13	+1.52
Greens	Gavin Brown	10,355	12.53	+6.62
Family First	Scott Amberley	3,028	3.66	−0.30
Socialist Alliance	Sue Bull	971	1.17	+0.77
Total formal votes		82,661	95.49	−0.78
Informal votes		3,905	4.51	+0.78
Turnout		86,566	94.12	−1.30
Two-party-preferred result
Labor	Richard Marles	53,083	64.22	+5.29
Liberal	Don Gibson	29,578	35.78	−5.29
Labor hold		Swing	+5.29	

=== Elections in the 2000s ===
==== 2007 ====
2007 Australian federal election: Corio
Party	Candidate	Votes	%	±%
Labor	Richard Marles	37,778	45.49	−1.19
Liberal	Angelo Kakouros	24,591	29.61	−10.68
Independent	Gavan O'Connor	10,530	12.68	+12.68
Greens	Rob Leach	4,910	5.91	+0.00
Family First	Gordon Alderson	3,291	3.96	+1.37
Liberty & Democracy	Darrin Welden	791	0.95	+0.95
Democrats	Erica Menheere-Thompson	628	0.76	+0.76
Socialist Alliance	Chris Johnson	332	0.40	−0.23
Citizens Electoral Council	Ross Russell	190	0.23	−0.08
Total formal votes		83,041	96.27	+0.65
Informal votes		3,213	3.73	−0.65
Turnout		86,254	95.36	+0.33
Two-party-preferred result
Labor	Richard Marles	48,939	58.93	+3.29
Liberal	Angelo Kakouros	34,102	41.07	−3.29
Labor hold		Swing	+3.29	

==== 2004 ====
2004 Australian federal election: Corio
Party	Candidate	Votes	%	±%
Labor	Gavan O'Connor	37,405	46.68	−1.87
Liberal	Bruce King	32,289	40.29	+3.91
Greens	Brett Constable	4,733	5.91	+1.55
Independent	Steve Malesic	2,877	3.59	+3.59
Family First	Gordon Alderson	2,077	2.59	+2.59
Socialist Alliance	Tim Gooden	505	0.63	+0.63
Citizens Electoral Council	Steven Bird	251	0.31	+0.09
Total formal votes		80,137	95.62	+0.70
Informal votes		3,667	4.38	−0.70
Turnout		83,804	95.03	−1.11
Two-party-preferred result
Labor	Gavan O'Connor	44,588	55.64	−2.87
Liberal	Bruce King	35,549	44.36	+2.87
Labor hold		Swing	−2.87	

==== 2001 ====
2001 Australian federal election: Corio
Party	Candidate	Votes	%	±%
Labor	Gavan O'Connor	38,021	48.75	−2.07
Liberal	Steve Malesic	28,254	36.22	+2.58
Democrats	Erica Menheere-Thompson	5,388	6.91	+1.18
Greens	Catherine Johnson	3,388	4.34	+4.34
One Nation	Herbert Tirkot	1,420	1.82	−3.25
	Tim Gooden	698	0.89	+0.89
	Cheryl Fairbrother	653	0.84	+0.84
Citizens Electoral Council	Gareth Hill	176	0.23	+0.23
Total formal votes		77,998	94.91	−1.89
Informal votes		4,185	5.09	+1.89
Turnout		82,183	96.47	
Two-party-preferred result
Labor	Gavan O'Connor	45,787	58.70	−2.66
Liberal	Steve Malesic	32,211	41.30	+2.66
Labor hold		Swing	−2.66	

=== Elections in the 1990s ===
==== 1998 ====
1998 Australian federal election: Corio
Party	Candidate	Votes	%	±%
Labor	Gavan O'Connor	38,608	50.82	+0.06
Liberal	Dennis Jensen	25,561	33.64	−5.93
Democrats	Andre Csausov	4,352	5.73	−2.04
One Nation	Robert Grant	3,854	5.07	+5.07
Progressive Labour	Therese Self	3,116	4.10	+4.10
Unity	Michael Garbutcheon Singh	486	0.64	+0.64
Total formal votes		75,977	96.79	−0.18
Informal votes		2,516	3.21	+0.18
Turnout		78,493	95.64	−1.05
Two-party-preferred result
Labor	Gavan O'Connor	46,618	61.36	+4.56
Liberal	Dennis Jensen	29,359	38.64	−4.56
Labor hold		Swing	+4.56	

==== 1996 ====
1996 Australian federal election: Corio
Party	Candidate	Votes	%	±%
Labor	Gavan O'Connor	38,656	50.76	−3.54
Liberal	Srechko Kontelj	30142	39.58	+1.87
Democrats	Gerald Desmarais	5,919	7.77	+3.08
Natural Law	Robert Nieuwenhuis	1,443	1.89	+1.25
Total formal votes		76,160	96.67	−0.11
Informal votes		2,378	3.03	+0.11
Turnout		78,538	96.68	+0.20
Two-party-preferred result
Labor	Gavan O'Connor	43,112	56.80	−2.03
Liberal	Srechko Kontelj	32,788	43.20	+2.03
Labor hold		Swing	−2.03	

==== 1993 ====
1993 Australian federal election: Corio
Party	Candidate	Votes	%	±%
Labor	Gavan O'Connor	38,133	52.84	+8.90
Liberal	John Tol	28,063	38.88	+0.56
Democrats	Mike Martorana	3,559	4.93	−5.40
Independent	Aidan Bell	1,076	1.49	+1.49
Call to Australia	Ian Winter	889	1.23	−2.46
Natural Law	Carol Smith	450	0.62	+0.62
Total formal votes		72,170	97.10	+0.86
Informal votes		2,159	2.90	−0.86
Turnout		74,329	95.49	
Two-party-preferred result
Labor	Gavan O'Connor	41,255	57.19	+2.97
Liberal	John Tol	30,880	42.81	−2.97
Labor hold		Swing	+2.97	

==== 1990 ====
1990 Australian federal election: Corio
Party	Candidate	Votes	%	±%
Labor	Gordon Scholes	30,419	43.9	−8.2
Liberal	Adrienne Edgar	26,534	38.3	+2.9
Democrats	Donal Storey	7,153	10.3	+4.2
Call to Australia	Ian Winter	2,555	3.7	+3.7
Independent	Horst Pfeifer	1,978	2.9	+2.9
Independent	Bruce Tanner	594	0.9	+0.9
Total formal votes		69,233	96.2	
Informal votes		2,712	3.8	
Turnout		71,945	95.8	
Two-party-preferred result
Labor	Gordon Scholes	37,428	54.2	−5.9
Liberal	Adrienne Edgar	31,606	45.8	+5.9
Labor hold		Swing	−5.9	

=== Elections in the 1980s ===
==== 1987 ====
1987 Australian federal election: Corio
Party	Candidate	Votes	%	±%
Labor	Gordon Scholes	34,064	54.9	−4.3
Liberal	Patrick Conheady	20,220	32.6	−1.1
Democrats	Greta Pearce	3,775	6.1	+3.1
Independent	Danielle Dixon	2,602	4.2	+4.2
Independent	Tom Davies	1,378	2.2	+2.2
Total formal votes		62,039	94.4	
Informal votes		3,688	5.6	
Turnout		65,727	96.9	
Two-party-preferred result
Labor	Gordon Scholes	39,026	62.9	+0.5
Liberal	Patrick Conheady	23,004	37.1	−0.5
Labor hold		Swing	+0.5	

==== 1984 ====
1984 Australian federal election: Corio
Party	Candidate	Votes	%	±%
Labor	Gordon Scholes	35,042	59.2	−1.8
Liberal	Roger Phipps	19,927	33.7	−0.4
Democrats	Greta Pearce	1,788	3.0	−1.8
National	James King	1,198	2.0	+2.0
Democratic Labor	Louise Sharah	865	1.5	+1.5
Independent	Ian Green	368	0.6	+0.6
Total formal votes		59,188	90.5	
Informal votes		6,208	9.5	
Turnout		65,396	96.0	
Two-party-preferred result
Labor	Gordon Scholes	36,920	62.4	−1.5
Liberal	Roger Phipps	22,258	37.6	+1.5
Labor hold		Swing	−1.5	

==== 1983 ====
1983 Australian federal election: Corio
Party	Candidate	Votes	%	±%
Labor	Gordon Scholes	43,016	60.1	+3.5
Liberal	Kent Henderson	25,075	35.0	−0.2
Democrats	Guenter Sahr	3,452	4.8	−0.1
Total formal votes		71,543	98.0	
Informal votes		1,429	2.0	
Turnout		72,972	96.0	
Two-party-preferred result
Labor	Gordon Scholes		63.0	+3.2
Liberal	Kent Henderson		37.0	−3.2
Labor hold		Swing	+3.2	

==== 1980 ====
1980 Australian federal election: Corio
Party	Candidate	Votes	%	±%
Labor	Gordon Scholes	39,138	56.6	+8.2
Liberal	Mieczyslaw Parks	24,051	34.8	−5.5
Democrats	Reginald Sweeten	3,418	4.9	−2.4
Democratic Labor	James Jordan	2,528	3.7	−0.4
Total formal votes		69,135	97.5	
Informal votes		1,781	2.5	
Turnout		70,916	95.0	
Two-party-preferred result
Labor	Gordon Scholes		59.8	+6.9
Liberal	Mieczyslaw Parks		40.2	−6.9
Labor hold		Swing	+6.9	

=== Elections in the 1970s ===
==== 1977 ====
1977 Australian federal election: Corio
Party	Candidate	Votes	%	±%
Labor	Gordon Scholes	31,612	48.4	−0.6
Liberal	Clive Bubb	26,330	40.3	−5.9
Democrats	Guenter Sahr	4,740	7.3	+7.3
Democratic Labor	James Jordan	2,685	4.1	+0.2
Total formal votes		65,367	97.3	
Informal votes		1,794	2.7	
Turnout		67,161	96.2	
Two-party-preferred result
Labor	Gordon Scholes	34,588	52.9	+2.9
Liberal	Clive Bubb	30,779	47.1	−2.9
Labor hold		Swing	+2.9	

==== 1975 ====
1975 Australian federal election: Corio
Party	Candidate	Votes	%	±%
Labor	Gordon Scholes	30,688	49.0	−5.7
Liberal	Gordon Hall	28,907	46.2	+7.0
Democratic Labor	John Timberlake	2,425	3.9	−0.7
Australia	Guenter Sahr	604	1.0	−0.4
Total formal votes		62,624	98.0	
Informal votes		1,298	2.0	
Turnout		63,922	95.7	
Two-party-preferred result
Labor	Gordon Scholes	31,322	50.0	−6.0
Liberal	Gordon Hall	31,302	50.0	+6.0
Labor hold		Swing	−6.0	

==== 1974 ====
1974 Australian federal election: Corio
Party	Candidate	Votes	%	±%
Labor	Gordon Scholes	33,029	54.7	−1.9
Liberal	Gordon Hall	23,680	39.2	+4.8
Democratic Labor	John Timberlake	2,771	4.6	−4.4
Australia	Guenter Sahr	860	1.4	+1.4
Total formal votes		60,340	98.0	
Informal votes		1,231	2.0	
Turnout		61,571	95.2	
Two-party-preferred result
Labor	Gordon Scholes		56.0	−1.5
Liberal	Gordon Hall		44.0	+1.5
Labor hold		Swing	−1.5	

==== 1972 ====
1972 Australian federal election: Corio
Party	Candidate	Votes	%	±%
Labor	Gordon Scholes	29,942	56.6	+6.1
Liberal	John Pawson	18,174	34.4	+0.0
Democratic Labor	John Timberlake	4,776	9.0	−0.5
Total formal votes		52,892	98.0	
Informal votes		1,081	2.0	
Turnout		53,973	95.5	
Two-party-preferred result
Labor	Gordon Scholes		57.5	+3.7
Liberal	John Pawson		42.5	−3.7
Labor hold		Swing	+3.7	

=== Elections in the 1960s ===
==== 1969 ====
1969 Australian federal election: Corio
Party	Candidate	Votes	%	±%
Labor	Gordon Scholes	24,917	50.5	+8.1
Liberal	Charles Malpas	16,989	34.4	−9.4
Democratic Labor	John Timberlake	4,680	9.5	−1.4
Independent	Stuart Harris	1,773	3.6	+3.6
Independent	Elsie Brushfield	1,013	2.1	+2.1
Total formal votes		49,372	96.8	
Informal votes		1,623	3.2	
Turnout		50,995	96.0	
Two-party-preferred result
Labor	Gordon Scholes		53.8	+10.0
Liberal	Charles Malpas		46.2	−10.0
Labor hold		Swing	+10.0	

==== 1967 by-election ====
Corio by-election, 1967
Party	Candidate	Votes	%	±%
Labor	Gordon Scholes	25,679	50.3	+11.1
Liberal	Ronald Hay	18,583	36.4	−8.9
Democratic Labor	Patrick Bourke	5,418	10.6	−0.2
Liberal Reform Group	Sir George Jones	923	1.8	−0.3
Independent	Mabel Cardinal	486	1.0	+1.0
Total formal votes		51,089	98.0	
Informal votes		1,038	2.0	
Turnout		52,127	93.4	
Two-party-preferred result
Labor	Gordon Scholes		53.1	+11.0
Liberal	Ronald Hay		46.9	−11.0
Labor gain from Liberal		Swing	+11.0	

==== 1966 ====
1966 Australian federal election: Corio
Party	Candidate	Votes	%	±%
Liberal	Hubert Opperman	22,519	45.3	+1.3
Labor	Gordon Scholes	19,478	39.2	−6.4
Democratic Labor	James Mahoney	5,369	10.8	+0.4
Independent	Elsie Brushfield	1,262	2.5	+2.5
Liberal Reform Group	William Dobell	1,044	2.1	+2.1
Total formal votes		49,672	96.2	
Informal votes		1,940	3.8	
Turnout		51,612	95.9	
Two-party-preferred result
Liberal	Hubert Opperman	28,767	57.9	+4.6
Labor	Gordon Scholes	20,905	42.1	−4.6
Liberal hold		Swing	+4.6	

==== 1963 ====
1963 Australian federal election: Corio
Party	Candidate	Votes	%	±%
Labor	Bob Hawke	21,933	45.6	+3.7
Liberal	Hubert Opperman	21,185	44.0	+0.7
Democratic Labor	James Mahoney	5,004	10.4	−4.5
Total formal votes		48,122	99.0	
Informal votes		509	1.0	
Turnout		48,631	96.9	
Two-party-preferred result
Liberal	Hubert Opperman	25,666	53.3	−3.1
Labor	Bob Hawke	22,456	46.7	+3.1
Liberal hold		Swing	−3.1	

==== 1961 ====
1961 Australian federal election: Corio
Party	Candidate	Votes	%	±%
Liberal	Hubert Opperman	19,790	43.3	−3.9
Labor	Lindsay Romey	19,149	41.9	+3.0
Democratic Labor	James Mahoney	6,791	14.9	+1.0
Total formal votes		45,730	98.1	
Informal votes		864	1.9	
Turnout		46,594	95.4	
Two-party-preferred result
Liberal	Hubert Opperman	25,810	56.4	−0.3
Labor	Lindsay Romey	19,920	43.6	+0.3
Liberal hold		Swing	−0.3	

=== Elections in the 1950s ===
==== 1958 ====
1958 Australian federal election: Corio
Party	Candidate	Votes	%	±%
Liberal	Hubert Opperman	20,019	47.2	−2.1
Labor	Bernard O'Leary	16,508	38.9	−2.1
Democratic Labor	James Mahoney	5,920	13.9	+4.2
Total formal votes		42,447	98.3	
Informal votes		717	1.7	
Turnout		43,164	95.8	
Two-party-preferred result
Liberal	Hubert Opperman	24,065	56.7	−0.5
Labor	Bernard O'Leary	18,382	43.3	+0.5
Liberal hold		Swing	−0.5	

==== 1955 ====
1955 Australian federal election: Corio
Party	Candidate	Votes	%	±%
Liberal	Hubert Opperman	19,959	49.3	−0.5
Labor	Charles Loader	16,632	41.0	−9.2
Labor (A-C)	Francis Singleton	3,929	9.7	+9.7
Total formal votes		40,520	98.4	
Informal votes		657	1.6	
Turnout		41,177	93.9	
Two-party-preferred result
Liberal	Hubert Opperman	23,182	57.2	+7.4
Labor	Charles Loader	17,338	42.8	−7.4
Liberal gain from Labor		Swing	−5.9	

==== 1954 ====
1954 Australian federal election: Corio
Party	Candidate	Votes	%	±%
Liberal	Hubert Opperman	22,703	51.4	+1.2
Labor	John Dedman	21,487	48.6	−1.2
Total formal votes		44,190	99.3	
Informal votes		308	0.7	
Turnout		44,498	95.7	
Liberal hold		Swing	+1.2	

==== 1951 ====
1951 Australian federal election: Corio
Party	Candidate	Votes	%	±%
Liberal	Hubert Opperman	20,731	50.2	−0.1
Labor	John Dedman	20,592	49.8	+0.1
Total formal votes		41,323	99.1	
Informal votes		368	0.9	
Turnout		41,691	96.2	
Liberal hold		Swing	−0.1	

=== Elections in the 1940s ===
==== 1949 ====
1949 Australian federal election: Corio
Party	Candidate	Votes	%	±%
Liberal	Hubert Opperman	20,018	50.3	+7.4
Labor	John Dedman	19,783	49.7	−6.2
Total formal votes		39,801	99.2	
Informal votes		316	0.8	
Turnout		40,117	96.2	
Liberal gain from Labor		Swing	+6.7	

==== 1946 ====
1946 Australian federal election: Corio
Party	Candidate	Votes	%	±%
Labor	John Dedman	34,330	56.4	+4.1
Liberal	Frederick Wallace	25,546	42.0	+24.5
Independent	Winifred West	968	1.6	+1.6
Total formal votes		60,844	98.6	
Informal votes		838	1.4	
Turnout		61,682	94.6	
Two-party-preferred result
Labor	John Dedman		57.2	+2.4
Liberal	Frederick Wallace		42.8	+42.8
Labor hold		Swing	+2.4	

==== 1943 ====
1943 Australian federal election: Corio
Party	Candidate	Votes	%	±%
Labor	John Dedman	30,578	52.3	−0.3
Independent	Neil Freeman	16,013	27.4	+27.4
United Australia	Rupert Curnow	10,255	17.5	−22.4
Progressive	James Baker	1,589	2.7	+2.7
Total formal votes		58,435	98.5	
Informal votes		908	1.5	
Turnout		59,343	97.1	
Two-party-preferred result
Labor	John Dedman		54.8	−1.6
Independent	Neil Freeman		45.2	+45.2
Labor hold		Swing	−1.6	

==== 1940 ====
1940 Australian federal election: Corio
Party	Candidate	Votes	%	±%
Labor	John Dedman	28,056	52.6	+9.1
United Australia	Gerald Patterson	21,271	39.9	−16.6
Independent	Harry Lyall	4,033	7.6	+7.6
Total formal votes		53,360	99.1	
Informal votes		501	0.9	
Turnout		53,861	96.6	
Two-party-preferred result
Labor	John Dedman		56.4	+12.9
United Australia	Gerald Patterson		43.6	−12.9
Labor hold		Swing	+12.9	

==== 1940 by-election ====
Corio by-election, 1940
Party	Candidate	Votes	%	±%
Labor	John Dedman	26,122	51.8	+8.3
United Australia	James Vinton Smith	22,878	45.3	−11.2
Communist	Gerry O'Day	1,466	2.9	+2.9
Total formal votes		50,466	98.5	
Informal votes		786	1.5	
Turnout		51,252	93.3	
Two-party-preferred result
Labor	John Dedman		54.4	+10.9
United Australia	James Vinton Smith		45.6	−10.9
Labor gain from United Australia		Swing	+10.9	

=== Elections in the 1930s ===
==== 1937 ====
1937 Australian federal election: Corio
Party	Candidate	Votes	%	±%
United Australia	Richard Casey	28,845	56.5	−1.5
Labor	Leo Carmody	22,170	43.5	+4.1
Total formal votes		51,015	98.6	
Informal votes		701	1.4	
Turnout		51,716	96.7	
United Australia hold		Swing	−1.8	

==== 1934 ====
1934 Australian federal election: Corio
Party	Candidate	Votes	%	±%
United Australia	Richard Casey	30,622	58.5	+21.5
Labor	John Dedman	20,394	38.9	+4.0
Communist	William Morrison	1,355	2.6	+2.6
Total formal votes		52,371	98.1	
Informal votes		1,040	1.9	
Turnout		53,411	94.5	
Two-party-preferred result
United Australia	Richard Casey		58.8	−1.8
Labor	John Dedman		41.2	+1.8
United Australia hold		Swing	−1.8	

==== 1931 ====
1931 Australian federal election: Corio
Party	Candidate	Votes	%	±%
United Australia	Richard Casey	18,724	37.0	−7.0
Labor	Arthur Lewis	17,623	34.9	−21.1
Ind. United Australia	John Lister	14,191	28.1	+28.1
Total formal votes		50,538	98.5	
Informal votes		776	1.5	
Turnout		51,314	93.9	
Two-party-preferred result
United Australia	Richard Casey	30,613	60.6	+16.6
Labor	Arthur Lewis	19,925	39.4	−16.6
United Australia gain from Labor		Swing	+16.6	

=== Elections in the 1920s ===
==== 1929 ====
1929 Australian federal election: Corio
Party	Candidate	Votes	%	±%
Labor	Arthur Lewis	27,525	56.0	+14.5
Nationalist	John Lister	21,639	44.0	−14.5
Total formal votes		49,164	98.9	
Informal votes		533	1.1	
Turnout		49,697	94.8	
Labor gain from Nationalist		Swing	+14.5	

==== 1928 ====
1928 Australian federal election: Corio
Party	Candidate	Votes	%	±%
Nationalist	John Lister	27,497	58.5	+1.8
Labor	Peter Randles	19,500	41.5	−1.8
Total formal votes		46,997	97.5	
Informal votes		1,223	2.5	
Turnout		48,220	93.8	
Nationalist hold		Swing	+1.8	

==== 1925 ====
1925 Australian federal election: Corio
Party	Candidate	Votes	%	±%
Nationalist	John Lister	24,775	56.7	+5.9
Labor	Peter Randles	18,915	43.3	−5.9
Total formal votes		43,690	98.8	
Informal votes		539	1.2	
Turnout		44,229	92.7	
Nationalist hold		Swing	+5.9	

==== 1922 ====
1922 Australian federal election: Corio
Party	Candidate	Votes	%	±%
Nationalist	John Lister	12,046	50.8	+5.0
Labor	Alfred Hampson	11,646	49.2	+11.0
Total formal votes		23,692	98.1	
Informal votes		463	1.9	
Turnout		24,155	57.5	
Nationalist hold		Swing	−6.9	

=== Elections in the 1910s ===
==== 1919 ====
1919 Australian federal election: Corio
Party	Candidate	Votes	%	±%
Nationalist	John Lister	13,702	45.3	−12.0
Labor	Alfred Ozanne	11,658	38.5	−4.2
Victorian Farmers	Arthur Walter	4,623	15.3	+15.3
Ind. Nationalist	Anwoth Brown	282	0.9	+0.9
Total formal votes		30,265	96.6	
Informal votes		1,056	3.4	
Turnout		31,321	80.6	
Two-party-preferred result
Nationalist	John Lister	17,406	57.5	+0.2
Labor	Alfred Ozanne	12,859	42.5	−0.2
Nationalist hold		Swing	+0.2	

==== 1917 ====
1917 Australian federal election: Corio
Party	Candidate	Votes	%	±%
Nationalist	John Lister	18,902	57.3	+8.5
Labor	Alfred Ozanne	14,102	42.7	−8.5
Total formal votes		33,004	98.4	
Informal votes		536	1.6	
Turnout		33,540	86.8	
Nationalist gain from Labor		Swing	+8.5	

==== 1914 ====
1914 Australian federal election: Corio
Party	Candidate	Votes	%	±%
Labor	Alfred Ozanne	16,064	51.2	+3.3
Liberal	William Kendell	15,316	48.8	−2.6
Total formal votes		31,380	98.4	
Informal votes		519	1.6	
Turnout		31,899	82.4	
Labor gain from Liberal		Swing	+3.0	

==== 1913 ====
1913 Australian federal election: Corio
Party	Candidate	Votes	%	±%
Liberal	William Kendell	14,804	51.4	+4.7
Labor	Alfred Ozanne	13,770	47.9	−5.4
Independent	John Reed	201	0.7	+0.7
Total formal votes		28,775	97.5	
Informal votes		728	2.5	
Turnout		29,503	76.6	
Liberal gain from Labor		Swing	+5.1	

==== 1910 ====
1910 Australian federal election: Corio
Party	Candidate	Votes	%	±%
Labour	Alfred Ozanne	10,164	54.4	+54.4
Liberal	Richard Crouch	8,519	45.6	−9.4
Total formal votes		18,683	97.7	
Informal votes		434	2.3	
Turnout		19,117	62.2	
Labour gain from Liberal		Swing	+54.4	

=== Elections in the 1900s ===
==== 1906 ====
1906 Australian federal election: Corio
Party	Candidate	Votes	%	±%
Protectionist	Richard Crouch	10,135	55.0	+9.5
Protectionist	James McCay	8,288	45.0	+8.2
Total formal votes		18,432	96.8	
Informal votes		612	3.2	
Turnout		19,035	62.0	
Protectionist hold		Swing	+0.2	

==== 1903 ====
1903 Australian federal election: Corio
Party	Candidate	Votes	%	±%
Protectionist	Richard Crouch	6,951	45.5	+3.7
Free Trade	Donald Macdonald	5,623	36.8	+23.4
Labour	John Reed	2,709	17.7	+17.7
Total formal votes		15,283	98.5	
Informal votes		225	1.5	
Turnout		15,508	60.7	
Protectionist hold		Swing	−4.3	

==== 1901 ====
1901 Australian federal election: Corio
Party	Candidate	Votes	%	±%
Protectionist	Richard Crouch	2,710	41.8	+41.8
Ind. Protectionist	Jonas Levien	1,580	24.4	+24.4
Ind. Protectionist	Angus McNaughton	1,321	20.4	+20.4
Free Trade	James Boyd	867	13.4	+13.4
Total formal votes		6,478	99.1	
Informal votes		59	0.9	
Turnout		6,537	54.3	
Protectionist win		(new seat)		
