= Electoral results for the Division of Corangamite =

Australian division election results

This is a list of electoral results for the Division of Corangamite in Australian federal elections from the division's creation in 1901 until the present.

== Members ==
Member	Party	Term
Chester Manifold	Protectionist	1901–1903
John Gratton Wilson	Free Trade/Anti-Socialist	1903–1909
John Gratton Wilson	Liberal	1909–1910
James Scullin	Labor	1910–1913
Chester Manifold	Liberal	1913–1917
Chester Manifold	Nationalist	1917–1918
William Gibson	Victorian Farmers' Union/Country	1918–1929
Richard Crouch	Labor	1929–1931
William Gibson	Country	1931–1934
Geoffrey Street	United Australia	1934–1940
Allan McDonald	United Australia	1940–1945
Allan McDonald	Liberal	1945–1953
Dan Mackinnon	Liberal	1953–1966
Tony Street	Liberal	1966–1984
Stewart McArthur	Liberal	1984–2007
Darren Cheeseman	Labor	2007–2013
Sarah Henderson	Liberal	2013–2019
Libby Coker	Labor	2019–present

== Election results ==
=== Elections in the 2020s ===
==== 2025 ====
2025 Australian federal election: Corangamite
Party	Candidate	Votes	%	±%
Labor	Libby Coker	38,814	37.31	−1.09
Liberal	Darcy Dunstan	35,488	34.12	+0.10
Greens	Mitch Pope	14,925	14.35	−0.98
Independent	Kate Lockhart	4,565	4.39	+4.39
One Nation	Colin Seabrook	3,343	3.21	+0.77
Legalise Cannabis	Harley Mackenzie	3,161	3.04	+3.04
Trumpet of Patriots	James Jackson	2,452	2.36	+1.51
Libertarian	Paul Barker	1,272	1.22	−1.23
Total formal votes		104,020	96.28	+0.14
Informal votes		4,023	3.72	−0.14
Turnout		108,043	94.67	+6.61
Two-party-preferred result
Labor	Libby Coker	60,381	58.05	+0.21
Liberal	Darcy Dunstan	43,639	41.95	−0.21
Labor hold		Swing	+0.21	

==== 2022 ====
2022 Australian federal election: Corangamite
Party	Candidate	Votes	%	±%
Labor	Libby Coker	38,573	38.20	+2.41
Liberal	Stephanie Asher	34,463	34.13	−8.26
Greens	Alex Marshall	15,349	15.20	+6.49
United Australia	Daniel Abou-Zeid	3,233	3.20	+1.02
One Nation	Luke Sorensen	2,548	2.52	+2.52
Liberal Democrats	Paul Barker	2,526	2.50	+2.50
Animal Justice	Meg Watkins	1,986	1.97	−0.17
Justice	Jean-Marie D'Argent	1,421	1.41	−1.22
Federation	Stephen Juhasz	868	0.86	+0.86
Total formal votes		100,967	96.11	+0.06
Informal votes		4,088	3.89	−0.06
Turnout		105,055	93.26	+1.01
Two-party-preferred result
Labor	Libby Coker	58,160	57.60	+6.55
Liberal	Stephanie Asher	42,807	42.40	−6.55
Labor hold		Swing	+6.55	

Alluvial diagram for preference flows in the seat of Corangamite in the 2022 federal election. indicates at what stage the winning candidate had over 50% of the votes and was declared the winner.

=== Elections in the 2010s ===
==== 2019 ====
2019 Australian federal election: Corangamite
Party	Candidate	Votes	%	±%
Liberal	Sarah Henderson	43,017	42.33	−1.34
Labor	Libby Coker	36,047	35.47	+1.41
Greens	Simon Northeast	9,184	9.04	−3.05
Independent	Damien Cole	5,131	5.05	+5.05
Justice	Mandy Grimley	2,724	2.68	+0.41
United Australia	Neil Harvey	2,257	2.22	+2.22
Animal Justice	Naomi Adams	2,143	2.11	−0.13
Rise Up Australia	Ian Erskine	1,117	1.10	−0.07
Total formal votes		101,620	96.03	+0.73
Informal votes		4,196	3.97	−0.73
Turnout		105,816	94.82	+3.83
Two-party-preferred result
Labor	Libby Coker	51,895	51.07	+1.04
Liberal	Sarah Henderson	49,725	48.93	−1.04
Labor notional hold		Swing	+1.04	

As a result of the 2018 boundary redistribution, the Liberal-held seats of Corangamite and Dunkley became notionally marginal Labor seats.

==== 2016 ====
2016 Australian federal election: Corangamite
Party	Candidate	Votes	%	±%
Liberal	Sarah Henderson	45,687	46.42	−1.83
Labor	Libby Coker	30,267	30.75	−1.28
Greens	Patchouli Paterson	11,273	11.45	−0.41
Justice	Patrice Nelson	3,039	3.09	+3.09
Family First	Alan Barron	1,906	1.94	+0.96
Animal Justice	Andy Meddick	1,739	1.77	+1.77
Independent	Michael Lawrence	1,519	1.54	+1.54
Drug Law Reform	Courtney Dalton	1,269	1.29	+1.29
Liberal Democrats	Louis Rowe	871	0.89	+0.89
Rise Up Australia	Nick Steel	847	0.86	+0.57
Total formal votes		98,417	95.00	−0.57
Informal votes		5,181	5.00	+0.57
Turnout		103,598	93.94	−1.60
Two-party-preferred result
Liberal	Sarah Henderson	52,291	53.13	−0.81
Labor	Libby Coker	46,126	46.87	+0.81
Liberal hold		Swing	−0.81	

==== 2013 ====
2013 Australian federal election: Corangamite
Party	Candidate	Votes	%	±%
Liberal	Sarah Henderson	44,778	48.25	+3.15
Labor	Darren Cheeseman	29,728	32.03	−7.29
Greens	Lloyd Davies	11,007	11.86	+0.34
Palmer United	Buddy Rojek	2,026	2.18	+2.18
Sex Party	Jayden Millard	1,726	1.86	+1.86
Family First	Peter Wray	908	0.98	−0.99
Independent	Adrian Whitehead	694	0.75	+0.75
National	Andrew Black	598	0.64	+0.64
Christians	Alan Barron	499	0.54	+0.54
Country Alliance	Warren Jackman	408	0.44	+0.44
Rise Up Australia	Helen Rashleigh	273	0.29	+0.29
Protectionist	Nick Steel	156	0.17	+0.17
Total formal votes		92,801	95.57	−1.24
Informal votes		4,304	4.43	+1.24
Turnout		97,105	95.46	+0.56
Two-party-preferred result
Liberal	Sarah Henderson	50,057	53.94	+4.22
Labor	Darren Cheeseman	42,744	46.06	−4.22
Liberal gain from Labor		Swing	+4.22	

==== 2010 ====
2010 Australian federal election: Corangamite
Party	Candidate	Votes	%	±%
Liberal	Sarah Henderson	42,155	44.99	+0.29
Labor	Darren Cheeseman	37,043	39.53	−2.38
Greens	Mike Lawrence	10,713	11.43	+3.46
Family First	Ann Wojczuk	1,850	1.97	−1.59
Independent	Sally-Anne Brown	1,418	1.51	+1.51
Liberal Democrats	Nathan Timmins	520	0.55	+0.36
Total formal votes		93,699	96.78	−0.69
Informal votes		3,117	3.22	+0.69
Turnout		96,816	95.32	−1.15
Two-party-preferred result
Labor	Darren Cheeseman	47,235	50.41	−0.44
Liberal	Sarah Henderson	46,464	49.59	+0.44
Labor hold		Swing	−0.44	

=== Elections in the 2000s ===
==== 2007 ====
2007 Australian federal election: Corangamite
Party	Candidate	Votes	%	±%
Liberal	Stewart McArthur	40,408	44.70	−7.35
Labor	Darren Cheeseman	37,886	41.91	+5.16
Greens	Fiona Nelson	7,202	7.97	+0.46
Family First	Jan Edwards	3,217	3.56	+0.82
Democrats	Gabrielle Killeen	1,512	1.67	+1.67
Liberty & Democracy	Sukrit Sabhlok	169	0.19	+0.19
Total formal votes		90,394	97.47	+0.51
Informal votes		2,347	2.53	−0.51
Turnout		92,741	96.45	+0.39
Two-party-preferred result
Labor	Darren Cheeseman	45,968	50.85	+6.17
Liberal	Stewart McArthur	44,426	49.15	−6.17
Labor gain from Liberal		Swing	+6.17	

==== 2004 ====
2004 Australian federal election: Corangamite
Party	Candidate	Votes	%	±%
Liberal	Stewart McArthur	44,060	52.05	+4.89
Labor	Peter McMullin	31,105	36.75	+3.20
Greens	Stephen Chenery	6,355	7.51	+1.19
Family First	Christine Modra	2,318	2.74	+2.74
Socialist Alliance	Chris Johnson	491	0.58	+0.58
Citizens Electoral Council	Andrew Bailey	313	0.37	+0.37
Total formal votes		84,642	96.96	+0.37
Informal votes		2,652	3.04	−0.37
Turnout		87,294	96.06	−0.18
Two-party-preferred result
Liberal	Stewart McArthur	46,828	55.32	−0.05
Labor	Peter McMullin	37,814	44.68	+0.05
Liberal hold		Swing	−0.05	

==== 2001 ====
2001 Australian federal election: Corangamite
Party	Candidate	Votes	%	±%
Liberal	Stewart McArthur	37,929	47.42	+1.40
Labor	Michael Bjork-Billings	26,569	33.21	−2.87
Democrats	Robyn Hodge	5,128	6.41	+0.02
Greens	Iain Lygo	5,098	6.37	+3.30
One Nation	Graham Hills	1,982	2.48	−3.07
Liberals for Forests	Nigel Strauss	1,960	2.45	+2.45
Independent	Simon Arundell	1,326	1.66	−0.53
Total formal votes		79,992	96.62	−0.83
Informal votes		2,798	3.38	+0.83
Turnout		82,790	96.86	
Two-party-preferred result
Liberal	Stewart McArthur	44,529	55.67	+1.17
Labor	Michael Bjork-Billings	35,463	44.33	−1.17
Liberal hold		Swing	+1.17	

=== Elections in the 1990s ===
==== 1998 ====
1998 Australian federal election: Corangamite
Party	Candidate	Votes	%	±%
Liberal	Stewart McArthur	34,336	46.02	−6.64
Labor	Michael Bjork-Billings	26,923	36.08	+0.22
Democrats	Jeffrey Paull	4,765	6.39	−5.10
One Nation	Duncan Maclean	4,140	5.55	+5.55
Greens	Adrian Whitehead	2,292	3.07	+3.07
Independent	Simon Arundell	1,634	2.19	+2.19
Unity	Robert Harwood	525	0.70	+0.70
Total formal votes		74,615	97.45	−0.33
Informal votes		1,949	2.55	+0.33
Turnout		76,564	95.79	−0.90
Two-party-preferred result
Liberal	Stewart McArthur	40,665	54.50	−3.19
Labor	Michael Bjork-Billings	33,950	45.50	+3.19
Liberal hold		Swing	−3.19	

==== 1996 ====
1996 Australian federal election: Corangamite
Party	Candidate	Votes	%	±%
Liberal	Stewart McArthur	38,445	52.66	+0.18
Labor	Bernie Eades	26,179	35.86	−1.80
Democrats	Pamela Johnson	8,382	11.48	+8.22
Total formal votes		73,006	97.78	+0.22
Informal votes		1,655	2.22	−0.22
Turnout		74,661	96.70	−0.08
Two-party-preferred result
Liberal	Stewart McArthur	41,939	57.69	+1.73
Labor	Bernie Eades	30,761	42.31	−1.73
Liberal hold		Swing	+1.73	

==== 1993 ====
1993 Australian federal election: Corangamite
Party	Candidate	Votes	%	±%
Liberal	Stewart McArthur	38,133	53.40	−0.82
Labor	Bernie Eades	26,199	36.69	+6.12
Democrats	Greta Pearce	2,208	3.09	−7.90
Independent	Norm Powell	2,203	3.09	+3.09
Independent	John Warnock	1,231	1.72	+1.72
Call to Australia	Terry Winter	866	1.21	−2.19
Natural Law	Isaac Golden	567	0.79	+0.79
Total formal votes		71,407	97.54	−0.14
Informal votes		1,798	2.46	+0.14
Turnout		73,205	96.77	
Two-party-preferred result
Liberal	Stewart McArthur	40,655	56.97	−3.82
Labor	Bernie Eades	30,701	43.03	+3.82
Liberal hold		Swing	−3.82	

==== 1990 ====
1990 Australian federal election: Corangamite
Party	Candidate	Votes	%	±%
Liberal	Stewart McArthur	36,516	54.2	+4.8
Labor	Ian Caldwell	20,582	30.6	−9.5
Democrats	Rob Mann	7,399	11.0	+4.7
Call to Australia	John Andrews	2,293	3.4	+3.4
Independent	Bruce Wilson	549	0.8	+0.8
Total formal votes		67,339	97.7	
Informal votes		1,595	2.3	
Turnout		68,934	96.4	
Two-party-preferred result
Liberal	Stewart McArthur	40,867	60.8	+5.1
Labor	Ian Caldwell	26,356	39.2	−5.1
Liberal hold		Swing	+5.1	

=== Elections in the 1980s ===
==== 1987 ====
1987 Australian federal election: Corangamite
Party	Candidate	Votes	%	±%
Liberal	Stewart McArthur	32,341	48.3	+0.4
Labor	Ian Caldwell	27,620	41.2	−0.7
Democrats	Rob Mann	4,225	6.3	+2.8
National	John McDonald	2,813	4.2	+0.9
Total formal votes		66,999	96.4	
Informal votes		2,504	3.6	
Turnout		69,503	95.9	
Two-party-preferred result
Liberal	Stewart McArthur	36,572	54.6	+1.2
Labor	Ian Caldwell	30,411	45.4	−1.2
Liberal hold		Swing	+1.2	

==== 1984 ====
1984 Australian federal election: Corangamite
Party	Candidate	Votes	%	±%
Liberal	Stewart McArthur	29,487	47.9	−5.9
Labor	Gavan O'Connor	25,772	41.9	−4.3
Democrats	Robert Mann	2,178	3.5	+3.5
National	Bruce Webster	2,028	3.3	+3.3
Democratic Labor	James Jordan	1,559	2.5	+2.5
Pensioner	Roy Charles	552	0.9	+0.9
Total formal votes		61,576	94.1	
Informal votes		3,846	5.9	
Turnout		65,422	97.0	
Two-party-preferred result
Liberal	Stewart McArthur	32,886	53.4	−0.4
Labor	Gavan O'Connor	28,660	46.6	+0.4
Liberal hold		Swing	−0.4	

==== 1984 by-election ====
Corangamite by-election, 1984
Party	Candidate	Votes	%	±%
Liberal	Stewart McArthur	32,083	46.7	−11.5
Labor	Gavan O'Connor	25,517	37.1	−4.7
National	David Seymour	9,794	14.2	+14.2
Democratic Labor	Joseph Lam	1,336	1.9	+1.9
Total formal votes		68,730	98.4	
Informal votes		1,096	1.6	
Turnout		69,826	92.4	
Two-party-preferred result
Liberal	Stewart McArthur	40,837	59.4	+1.2
Labor	Gavan O'Connor	27,893	40.6	−1.2
Liberal hold		Swing	+1.2	

==== 1983 ====
1983 Australian federal election: Corangamite
Party	Candidate	Votes	%	±%
Liberal	Tony Street	40,694	58.2	+1.6
Labor	Gavan O'Connor	29,231	41.8	+10.5
Total formal votes		69,925	98.3	
Informal votes		1,190	1.7	
Turnout		71,115	97.2	
Liberal hold		Swing	−4.6	

==== 1980 ====
1980 Australian federal election: Corangamite
Party	Candidate	Votes	%	±%
Liberal	Tony Street	37,913	56.6	−1.9
Labor	Neil Gedge	20,959	31.3	+4.9
Democrats	Kathleen May	5,031	7.5	−2.4
Democratic Labor	Bernie Finn	3,043	4.5	+0.2
Total formal votes		66,946	98.3	
Informal votes		1,164	1.7	
Turnout		68,110	96.4	
Two-party-preferred result
Liberal	Tony Street		62.8	−5.0
Labor	Neil Gedge		37.2	+5.0
Liberal hold		Swing	−5.0	

=== Elections in the 1970s ===
==== 1977 ====
1977 Australian federal election: Corangamite
Party	Candidate	Votes	%	±%
Liberal	Tony Street	37,163	58.5	−5.3
Labor	Shirley Ambrose	16,786	26.4	−4.4
Democrats	Kathleen May	6,275	9.9	+9.9
Democratic Labor	Francis O'Brien	2,756	4.3	+0.3
Independent	Neil McDonald	548	0.9	+0.9
Total formal votes		63,528	98.3	
Informal votes		1,101	1.7	
Turnout		64,629	97.7	
Two-party-preferred result
Liberal	Tony Street		67.8	−0.2
Labor	Shirley Ambrose		32.2	+0.2
Liberal hold		Swing	−0.2	

==== 1975 ====
1975 Australian federal election: Corangamite
Party	Candidate	Votes	%	±%
Liberal	Tony Street	38,253	65.0	+6.6
Labor	Shirley Ambrose	17,433	29.6	−4.6
Democratic Labor	Francis O'Brien	2,360	4.0	−1.4
Australia	Ian Slater	538	0.9	−1.1
Independent	Brian Costin	305	0.5	+0.5
Total formal votes		58,889	98.7	
Informal votes		800	1.3	
Turnout		59,689	97.5	
Two-party-preferred result
Liberal	Tony Street		69.2	+5.7
Labor	Shirley Ambrose		30.8	−5.7
Liberal hold		Swing	+5.7	

==== 1974 ====
1974 Australian federal election: Corangamite
Party	Candidate	Votes	%	±%
Liberal	Tony Street	32,960	58.4	+5.0
Labor	Edwin Morris	19,280	34.2	−3.2
Democratic Labor	Francis O'Brien	3,076	5.4	−3.8
Australia	Ian Slater	1,126	2.0	+2.0
Total formal votes		56,442	98.6	
Informal votes		792	1.4	
Turnout		57,234	96.6	
Two-party-preferred result
Liberal	Tony Street		63.5	+1.8
Labor	Edwin Morris		36.5	−1.8
Liberal hold		Swing	+1.8	

==== 1972 ====
1972 Australian federal election: Corangamite
Party	Candidate	Votes	%	±%
Liberal	Tony Street	26,769	53.4	−2.2
Labor	Edwin Morris	18,729	37.4	+4.2
Democratic Labor	Francis O'Brien	4,594	9.2	−2.0
Total formal votes		50,092	99.0	
Informal votes		530	1.0	
Turnout		50,622	97.6	
Two-party-preferred result
Liberal	Tony Street		61.7	−2.9
Labor	Edwin Morris		38.3	+2.9
Liberal hold		Swing	−2.9	

=== Elections in the 1960s ===
==== 1969 ====
1969 Australian federal election: Corangamite
Party	Candidate	Votes	%	±%
Liberal	Tony Street	25,900	55.6	+6.6
Labor	Neil Moorfoot	15,447	33.2	+7.4
Democratic Labor	Francis O'Brien	5,216	11.2	−0.8
Total formal votes		46,563	98.4	
Informal votes		770	1.6	
Turnout		47,333	97.2	
Two-party-preferred result
Liberal	Tony Street		64.6	−9.0
Labor	Neil Moorfoot		35.4	+9.0
Liberal hold		Swing	−9.0	

==== 1966 ====
1966 Australian federal election: Corangamite
Party	Candidate	Votes	%	±%
Liberal	Tony Street	22,334	47.6	−9.9
Labor	Lindsay Romey	11,419	24.3	−4.8
Country	Gilbert Anderson	7,585	16.1	+16.1
Democratic Labor	Brian Cronin	5,634	12.0	−1.4
Total formal votes		46,972	97.6	
Informal votes		1,160	2.4	
Turnout		48,132	97.2	
Two-party-preferred result
Liberal	Tony Street		72.1	+2.5
Labor	Lindsay Romey		27.9	−2.5
Liberal hold		Swing	+2.5	

==== 1963 ====
1963 Australian federal election: Corangamite
Party	Candidate	Votes	%	±%
Liberal	Dan Mackinnon	26,347	57.5	+4.7
Labor	Fred Black	13,324	29.1	+0.1
Democratic Labor	Francis O'Brien	6,139	13.4	−4.8
Total formal votes		45,810	99.3	
Informal votes		335	0.7	
Turnout		46,145	97.5	
Two-party-preferred result
Liberal	Dan Mackinnon		69.6	+1.3
Labor	Fred Black		30.4	−1.3
Liberal hold		Swing	+1.3	

==== 1961 ====
1961 Australian federal election: Corangamite
Party	Candidate	Votes	%	±%
Liberal	Dan Mackinnon	23,319	52.8	−1.0
Labor	Desmond Hulme	12,829	29.0	+2.3
Democratic Labor	Patrick Bourke	8,032	18.2	+0.4
Total formal votes		44,180	98.5	
Informal votes		668	1.5	
Turnout		44,848	96.9	
Two-party-preferred result
Liberal	Dan Mackinnon		68.3	−2.4
Labor	Desmond Hulme		31.7	+2.4
Liberal hold		Swing	−2.4	

=== Elections in the 1950s ===
==== 1958 ====
1958 Australian federal election: Corangamite
Party	Candidate	Votes	%	±%
Liberal	Dan Mackinnon	22,724	53.8	−7.0
Labor	Edwin Morris	11,299	26.7	+0.6
Democratic Labor	Patrick Bourke	7,526	17.8	+4.8
Independent	Elsie Brushfield	728	1.7	+1.7
Total formal votes		42,277	98.1	
Informal votes		824	1.9	
Turnout		43,101	96.6	
Two-party-preferred result
Liberal	Dan Mackinnon		70.7	−0.5
Labor	Edwin Morris		29.3	+0.5
Liberal hold		Swing	−0.5	

==== 1955 ====
1955 Australian federal election: Corangamite
Party	Candidate	Votes	%	±%
Liberal	Dan Mackinnon	24,349	60.8	+2.3
Labor	Edwin Morris	10,463	26.1	−15.4
Labor (A-C)	Leo O'Brien	5,210	13.0	+13.0
Total formal votes		40,022	98.0	
Informal votes		809	2.0	
Turnout		40,831	96.1	
Two-party-preferred result
Liberal	Dan Mackinnon		71.2	+12.7
Labor	Edwin Morris		28.8	−12.7
Liberal hold		Swing	+12.7	

==== 1954 ====
1954 Australian federal election: Corangamite
Party	Candidate	Votes	%	±%
Liberal	Dan Mackinnon	22,253	57.6	−1.1
Labor	Angus McLean	16,407	42.4	+1.1
Total formal votes		38,660	99.4	
Informal votes		244	0.6	
Turnout		38,904	97.2	
Liberal hold		Swing	−1.1	

==== 1953 by-election ====
Corangamite by-election, 1953
Party	Candidate	Votes	%	±%
Liberal	Dan Mackinnon	19,449	52.2	−6.5
Labor	Angus McLean	17,782	47.8	+6.5
Total formal votes		37,231	99.5	
Informal votes		196	0.5	
Turnout		37,427	92.3	
Liberal hold		Swing	−6.5	

==== 1951 ====
1951 Australian federal election: Corangamite
Party	Candidate	Votes	%	±%
Liberal	Allan McDonald	22,087	58.7	+1.2
Labor	Angus McLean	15,535	41.3	+1.7
Total formal votes		37,622	99.1	
Informal votes		357	0.9	
Turnout		37,979	97.0	
Liberal hold		Swing	−1.3	

=== Elections in the 1940s ===
==== 1949 ====
1949 Australian federal election: Corangamite
Party	Candidate	Votes	%	±%
Liberal	Allan McDonald	21,670	57.5	+1.1
Labor	Henry Stacpoole	14,936	39.6	−3.9
Independent	Elsie Brushfield	1,080	2.9	+2.9
Total formal votes		37,686	99.2	
Informal votes		286	0.8	
Turnout		37,972	97.0	
Two-party-preferred result
Liberal	Allan McDonald		60.0	+3.6
Labor	Henry Stacpoole		40.0	−3.6
Liberal hold		Swing	+3.6	

==== 1946 ====
1946 Australian federal election: Corangamite
Party	Candidate	Votes	%	±%
Liberal	Allan McDonald	25,999	54.9	+7.7
Labor	Henry Stacpoole	21,317	45.1	+0.0
Total formal votes		47,316	99.2	
Informal votes		393	0.8	
Turnout		47,709	94.7	
Liberal hold		Swing	+1.8	

==== 1943 ====
1943 Australian federal election: Corangamite
Party	Candidate	Votes	%	±%
United Australia	Allan McDonald	21,655	47.2	−9.0
Labor	Harold Miller	20,691	45.1	+1.3
Independent	Elsie Brushfield	1,856	4.0	+4.0
Independent Country	Sydney Donaldson	1,643	3.6	+3.6
Total formal votes		45,845	98.9	
Informal votes		515	1.1	
Turnout		46,360	96.6	
Two-party-preferred result
United Australia	Allan McDonald	24,342	53.1	−3.1
Labor	Harold Miller	21,503	46.9	+3.1
United Australia hold		Swing	+3.1	

==== 1940 ====
1940 Australian federal election: Corangamite
Party	Candidate	Votes	%	±%
United Australia	Allan McDonald	26,665	56.2	+2.3
Labor	Harold Miller	20,801	43.8	−2.3
Total formal votes		47,466	99.2	
Informal votes		371	0.8	
Turnout		47,837	95.7	
United Australia hold		Swing	+2.3	

=== Elections in the 1930s ===
==== 1937 ====
1937 Australian federal election: Corangamite
Party	Candidate	Votes	%	±%
United Australia	Geoffrey Street	25,788	53.9	+13.8
Labor	Arthur Haywood	22,096	46.1	+9.3
Total formal votes		47,884	99.0	
Informal votes		494	1.0	
Turnout		48,378	96.5	
United Australia hold		Swing	−5.7	

==== 1934 ====
1934 Australian federal election: Corangamite
Party	Candidate	Votes	%	±%
United Australia	Geoffrey Street	15,400	36.8	+36.8
Labor	Arthur Haywood	15,222	36.4	−0.7
Country	Gordon McGregor	5,217	12.5	−40.0
Country	Gordon Bristow	4,334	10.4	+10.4
Independent	Bevis Walters	1,676	4.0	+4.0
Total formal votes		41,849	96.1	
Informal votes		1,687	3.9	
Turnout		43,536	95.0	
Two-party-preferred result
United Australia	Geoffrey Street	23,296	55.7	+55.7
Labor	Arthur Haywood	18,553	44.3	+7.2
United Australia gain from Country		Swing	−7.2	

==== 1931 ====
1931 Australian federal election: Corangamite
Party	Candidate	Votes	%	±%
Country	William Gibson	25,985	62.9	+15.0
Labor	Richard Crouch	15,321	37.1	−15.0
Total formal votes		41,306	98.7	
Informal votes		540	1.3	
Turnout		41,846	95.7	
Country gain from Labor		Swing	+15.0	

=== Elections in the 1920s ===
==== 1929 ====
1929 Australian federal election: Corangamite
Party	Candidate	Votes	%	±%
Labor	Richard Crouch	20,924	52.1	+5.1
Country	William Gibson	19,244	47.9	−5.1
Total formal votes		40,168	98.9	
Informal votes		461	1.1	
Turnout		40,629	95.3	
Labor gain from Country		Swing	+5.1	

==== 1928 ====
1928 Australian federal election: Corangamite
Party	Candidate	Votes	%	±%
Country	William Gibson	20,501	53.0	−2.5
Labor	Richard Crouch	18,211	47.0	+2.5
Total formal votes		38,712	97.6	
Informal votes		959	2.4	
Turnout		39,671	95.4	
Country hold		Swing	−2.5	

==== 1925 ====
1925 Australian federal election: Corangamite
Party	Candidate	Votes	%	±%
Country	William Gibson	21,557	55.5	+27.0
Labor	William Nicol	17,297	44.5	+0.0
Total formal votes		38,854	98.7	
Informal votes		502	1.3	
Turnout		39,356	92.2	
Country hold		Swing	+1.6	

==== 1922 ====
1922 Australian federal election: Corangamite
Party	Candidate	Votes	%	±%
Labor	Richard Crouch	10,788	44.5	+5.0
Country	William Gibson	6,908	28.5	−8.2
Nationalist	Allan McDonald	6,530	27.0	+3.2
Total formal votes		24,226	97.2	
Informal votes		688	2.8	
Turnout		24,914	62.0	
Two-party-preferred result
Country	William Gibson	13,059	53.9	−4.3
Labor	Richard Crouch	11,167	46.1	+4.3
Country hold		Swing	−4.3	

=== Elections in the 1910s ===
==== 1919 ====
1919 Australian federal election: Corangamite
Party	Candidate	Votes	%	±%
Labor	Edward Malone	10,280	37.4	−2.2
Victorian Farmers	William Gibson	8,632	31.4	+31.4
Nationalist	Allan McDonald	8,563	31.2	−29.2
Total formal votes		27,475	96.6	
Informal votes		969	3.4	
Turnout		28,444	80.3	
Two-party-preferred result
Victorian Farmers	William Gibson	16,864	61.4	+61.4
Labor	Edward Malone	10,611	38.6	−1.0
Victorian Farmers hold		Swing	+1.0	

==== 1918 by-election ====
Corangamite by-election, 1918
Party	Candidate	Votes	%	±%
Labor	James Scullin	10,630	42.5	+2.9
Victorian Farmers	William Gibson	6,604	26.4	+26.4
Nationalist	George Knox	5,737	22.9	−37.5
Ind. Nationalist	Russell Coldham	1,174	4.7	+4.7
Returned Soldiers	Thomas Leaper	895	3.6	+3.6
Total formal votes		25,040	98.0	
Informal votes		516	2.0	
Turnout		25,553	73.2	
Two-party-preferred result
Victorian Farmers	William Gibson	14,096	56.3	+56.3
Labor	James Scullin	10,944	43.7	+4.1
Victorian Farmers gain from Nationalist		Swing	−4.1	

==== 1917 ====
1917 Australian federal election: Corangamite
Party	Candidate	Votes	%	±%
Nationalist	Chester Manifold	18,432	60.4	+8.8
Labor	Christopher Bennett	12,067	39.6	−8.8
Total formal votes		30,499	98.2	
Informal votes		562	1.8	
Turnout		31,061	84.6	
Nationalist hold		Swing	+8.8	

==== 1914 ====
1914 Australian federal election: Corangamite
Party	Candidate	Votes	%	±%
Liberal	Chester Manifold	16,575	51.6	−0.6
Labor	Thomas Burke	15,535	48.4	+0.6
Total formal votes		32,110	98.4	
Informal votes		530	1.6	
Turnout		32,640	85.8	
Liberal hold		Swing	−0.6	

==== 1913 ====
1913 Australian federal election: Corangamite
Party	Candidate	Votes	%	±%
Liberal	Chester Manifold	16,572	52.2	+6.1
Labor	James Scullin	15,173	47.8	−6.1
Total formal votes		31,745	99.1	
Informal votes		281	0.9	
Turnout		32,026	81.2	
Liberal gain from Labor		Swing	+6.1	

==== 1910 ====
1910 Australian federal election: Corangamite
Party	Candidate	Votes	%	±%
Labour	James Scullin	11,300	54.7	+29.4
Liberal	Gratton Wilson	9,350	45.3	−29.4
Total formal votes		20,650	98.2	
Informal votes		385	1.8	
Turnout		21,035	68.6	
Labour gain from Liberal		Swing	+29.4	

=== Elections in the 1900s ===
==== 1906 ====
1906 Australian federal election: Corangamite
Party	Candidate	Votes	%	±%
Anti-Socialist	Gratton Wilson	7,475	43.9	+8.7
Protectionist	Desmond Dunne	5,237	30.8	+8.1
Labour	Thomas Carey	4,306	25.3	+25.3
Total formal votes		17,018	95.7	
Informal votes		765	4.3	
Turnout		17,783	61.3	
Anti-Socialist hold		Swing	+4.4	

==== 1903 ====
1903 Australian federal election: Corangamite
Party	Candidate	Votes	%	±%
Free Trade	Gratton Wilson	4,600	35.2	+35.2
Ind. Protectionist	Desmond Dunne	4,036	30.8	+30.8
Protectionist	Agar Wynne	2,968	22.7	−49.5
Ind. Protectionist	John Woods	1,484	11.3	−16.5
Total formal votes		13,088	99.0	
Informal votes		138	1.0	
Turnout		13,226	55.5	
Free Trade gain from Protectionist		Swing	+35.2	

==== 1901 ====
1901 Australian federal election: Corangamite
Party	Candidate	Votes	%	±%
Protectionist	Chester Manifold	3,886	72.2	+72.2
Ind. Protectionist	John Woods	1,495	27.8	+27.8
Total formal votes		5,381	99.4	
Informal votes		34	0.6	
Turnout		5,415	48.6	
Protectionist win		(new seat)		
