= 1967 Corio by-election =

← 1966	22 July 1967	1969 →

The Corio seat in the House of Representatives
- Turnout: 52,127 (93.4%)
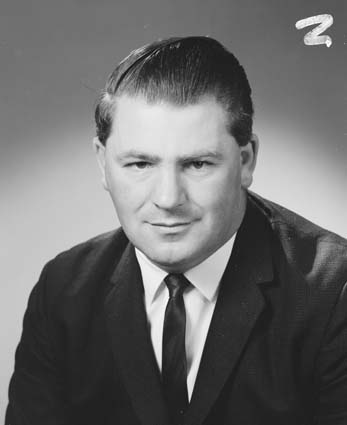

	First party	Second party
Candidate	Gordon Scholes	Ronald Hay
Party	Labor	Liberal
Popular vote	25,679	18,583
Percentage	50.3%	36.4%
Swing	▲11.1	▼8.9
MP before election
Hubert Opperman
Liberal
Elected MP
Gordon Scholes
Labor

A by-election was held for the Australian House of Representatives seat of Corio on 22 July 1967. This was triggered by the resignation of Liberal Party MP Hubert Opperman.

The by-election was won by Labor candidate Gordon Scholes, a significant boost for Gough Whitlam, the new Opposition Leader.

== Results ==
Corio by-election, 1967
Party	Candidate	Votes	%	±%
Labor	Gordon Scholes	25,679	50.3	+11.1
Liberal	Ronald Hay	18,583	36.4	−8.9
Democratic Labor	Patrick Bourke	5,418	10.6	−0.2
Liberal Reform Group	Sir George Jones	923	1.8	−0.3
Independent	Mabel Cardinal	486	1.0	+1.0
Total formal votes		51,089	98.0	
Informal votes		1,038	2.0	
Turnout		52,127	93.4	
Two-party-preferred result
Labor	Gordon Scholes		53.1	+11.0
Liberal	Ronald Hay		46.9	−11.0
Labor gain from Liberal		Swing	+11.0	
