= William Kendell =

Australian politician (1851–1922)

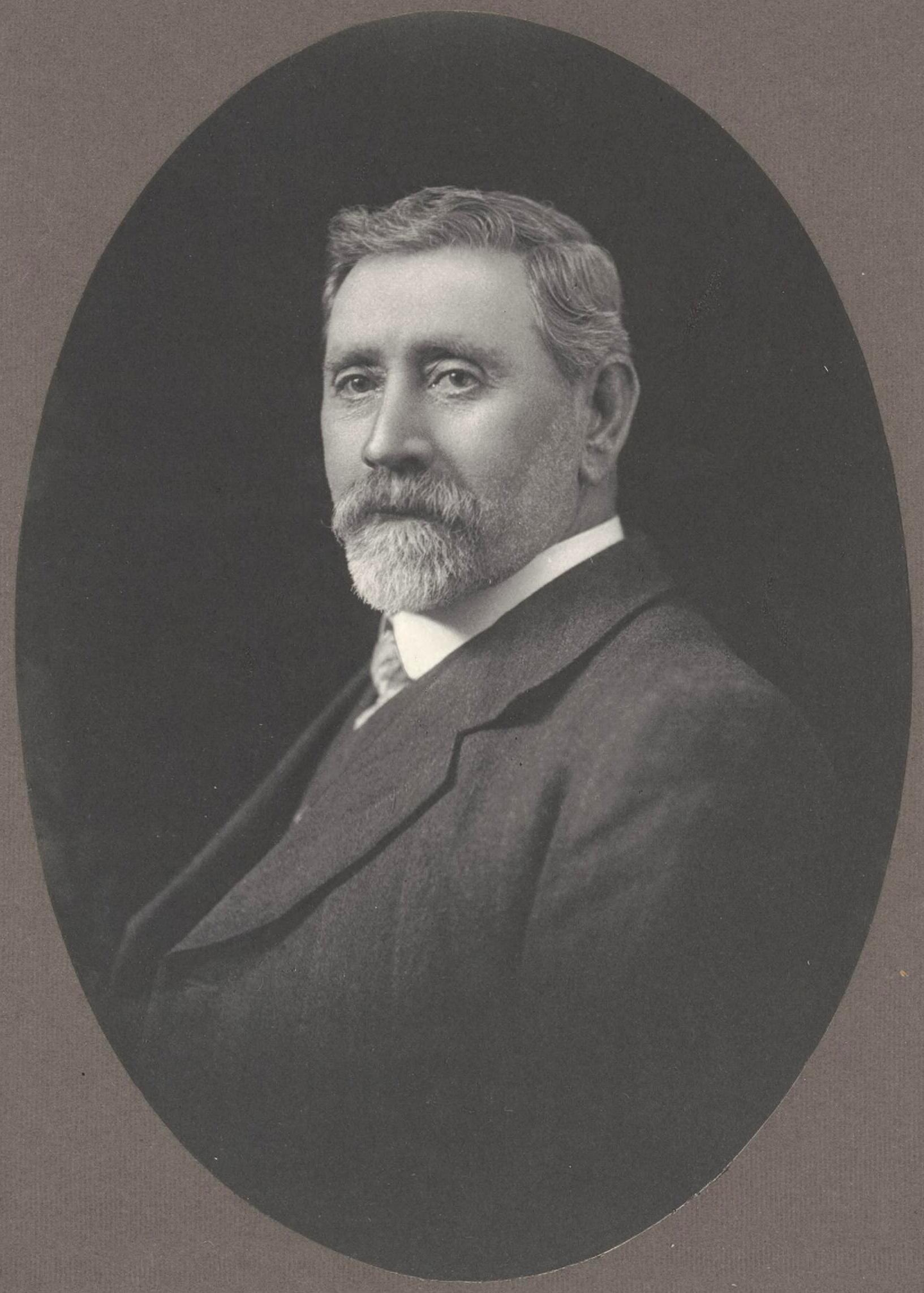

Member of the Australian Parliament for Corio
- In office 31 May 1913 – 5 September 1914
- Preceded by: Alfred Ozanne
- Succeeded by: Alfred Ozanne

Personal details
- Born: 6 March 1851 Mount Pleasant, South Australia
- Died: 20 October 1922 (aged 71) Auburn, Melbourne
- Party: Commonwealth Liberal Party
- Occupation: Farmer

William Kendell (6 March 1851 – 20 October 1922) was an Australian politician. Born in Mount Pleasant, South Australia, he was educated at public schools and moved to Victoria in 1888. He farmed at Wimmera and at Mount Mercier, and served on Dimboola and Borung Councils. In 1913, he was elected to the Australian House of Representatives as the Commonwealth Liberal Party member for Corio, defeating Labor MP Alfred Ozanne. Kendell was defeated by Ozanne in 1914, but in 1916 he was elected to the Victorian Legislative Council for North Eastern. He was an Honorary Minister from 1917 to 1919. He remained in the Legislative Council until his death in 1922.

Parliament of Australia
Preceded by Alfred Ozanne	Member for Corio; 1913–1914	Succeeded by Alfred Ozanne
