= Richard Marles =

Australian politician (born 1967)

The Honourable Richard Marles MP
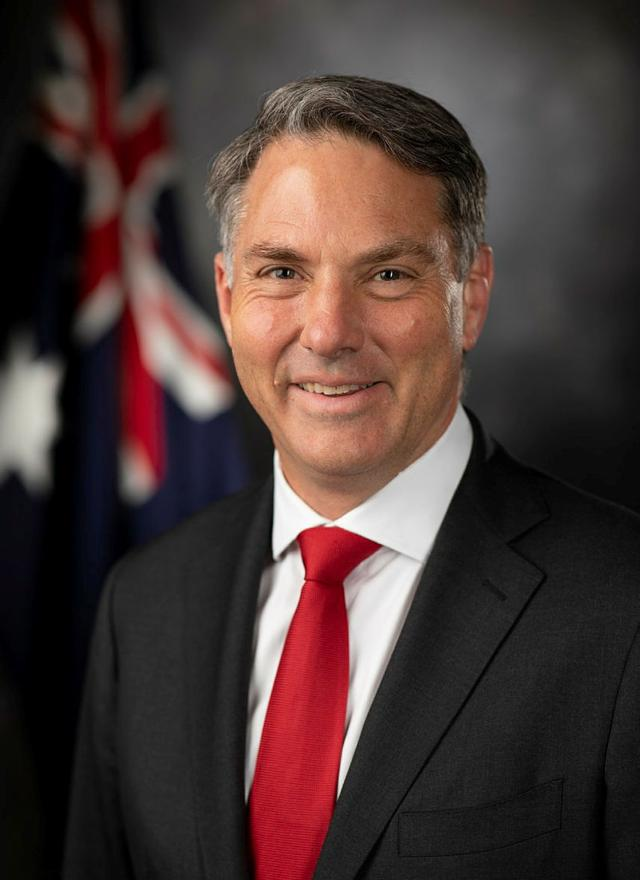
- Official portrait, 2022

Deputy Prime Minister of Australia
- Incumbent
- Assumed office 23 May 2022
- Prime Minister: Anthony Albanese
- Preceded by: Barnaby Joyce

Minister for Defence
- Incumbent
- Assumed office 1 June 2022
- Prime Minister: Anthony Albanese
- Preceded by: Peter Dutton

Minister for Employment
- In office 23 May 2022 – 1 June 2022
- Prime Minister: Anthony Albanese
- Preceded by: Stuart Robert (as Minister for Employment, Workforce, Skills, Small and Family Business)
- Succeeded by: Tony Burke (as Minister for Employment and Workplace Relations)

Deputy Leader of the Labor Party
- Incumbent
- Assumed office 30 May 2019
- Leader: Anthony Albanese
- Preceded by: Tanya Plibersek

Deputy Leader of the Opposition
- In office 30 May 2019 – 23 May 2022
- Leader: Anthony Albanese
- Preceded by: Tanya Plibersek
- Succeeded by: Sussan Ley

Minister for Trade
- In office 27 June 2013 – 18 September 2013
- Prime Minister: Kevin Rudd
- Preceded by: Craig Emerson
- Succeeded by: Andrew Robb

Member of the Australian Parliament for Corio
- Incumbent
- Assumed office 24 November 2007
- Preceded by: Gavan O'Connor

Personal details
- Born: Richard Donald Marles; 13 July 1967 (age 59) Geelong, Victoria, Australia
- Party: Labor
- Spouse(s): Rachel Schutze; Lisa Neville
- Children: 4
- Parent(s): Donald Marles; Fay Marles
- Education: Geelong Grammar School; Melbourne University (BSc, LLB)
- Occupation: Lawyer; unionist; politician
- Website: richardmarles.com.au

Richard Donald Marles (born 13 July 1967) is an Australian politician and lawyer who has served as the 19th deputy prime minister of Australia and the minister for defence since 2022. He has been the deputy leader of the Labor Party since 2019 and the member of parliament (MP) for the Victorian division of Corio since 2007.

Marles grew up in Geelong, Victoria, and is a lawyer by profession. He was assistant secretary of the Australian Council of Trade Unions from 2000 to 2007. He was elected to the House of Representatives at the 2007 federal election, after defeating incumbent Labor MP Gavan O'Connor for preselection in the seat of Corio. Marles was made a parliamentary secretary in 2009 and briefly served as Minister for Trade in 2013, having supported Kevin Rudd's return as prime minister. He was appointed to shadow cabinet after the ALP's defeat at the 2013 election and became a senior figure in the Labor Right faction.

Marles was elected deputy leader under Anthony Albanese after the 2019 election, becoming deputy opposition leader. Following the ALP's victory at the 2022 election he was appointed Deputy Prime Minister and Defence Minister.

== Early life ==
Marles was born on 13 July 1967 in Geelong, Victoria. He is the son of Donald Marles, a former headmaster of Trinity Grammar School, and Fay Marles (née Pearce), Victoria's first Equal Opportunity Commissioner and later Chancellor of the University of Melbourne.

Marles was educated at Geelong Grammar School, where his father had been a house master, and the University of Melbourne, where he was a resident of Ormond College. He joined the Melbourne University Labor Club in his first week at university and served as president of the Melbourne University Student Union in 1988. He was also the general secretary of the National Union of Students in 1989. He graduated with a Bachelor of Science and Bachelor of Laws with Honours and began his career as a solicitor with Melbourne industrial law firm Slater and Gordon. In 1994, he became legal officer for the Transport Workers Union (TWU) and was elected TWU national assistant secretary four years later. In 2000, he joined Australia's peak union body, the Australian Council of Trade Unions, as assistant secretary, remaining in the position until 2007.

== Political career ==
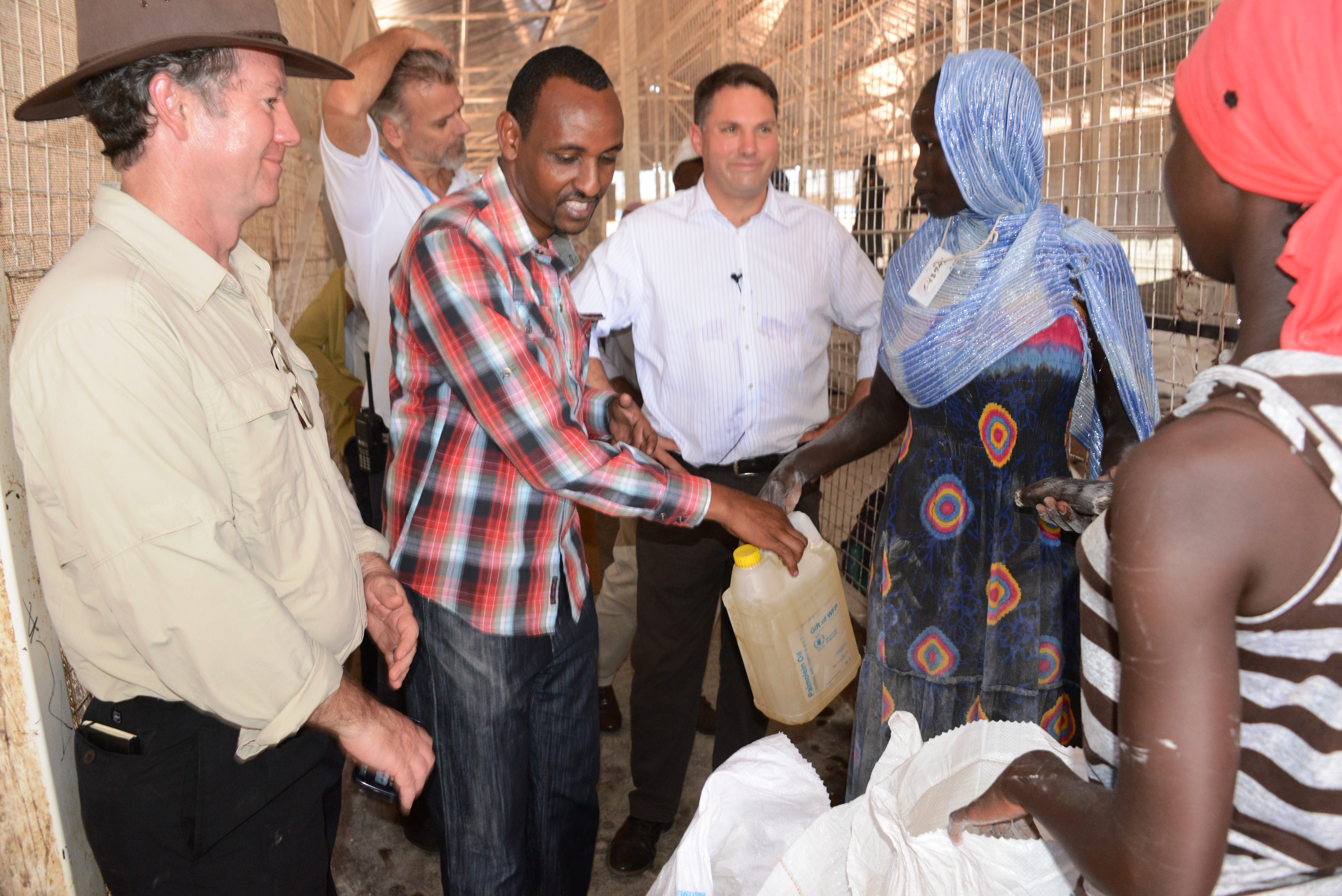
Marles visiting Dadaab Refugee Camp in Kenya, in 2012

=== Early career ===
In March 2006, Marles nominated for Labor preselection against the sitting member for Corio, Gavan O'Connor, as part of a challenge to several sitting members organised by the right-wing Labor Unity faction of the party. In the local ballot Marles polled 57% of the vote, and his endorsement was then confirmed by the party's public office selection committee.

Marles was elected member for Corio on 24 November 2007 in the election that returned the Labor Party to office under the leadership of Kevin Rudd. From February 2008 to June 2009 he was chair of the House of Representatives Standing Committee on Aboriginal and Torres Strait Islander Affairs.

=== Parliamentary secretary and Minister for Trade ===
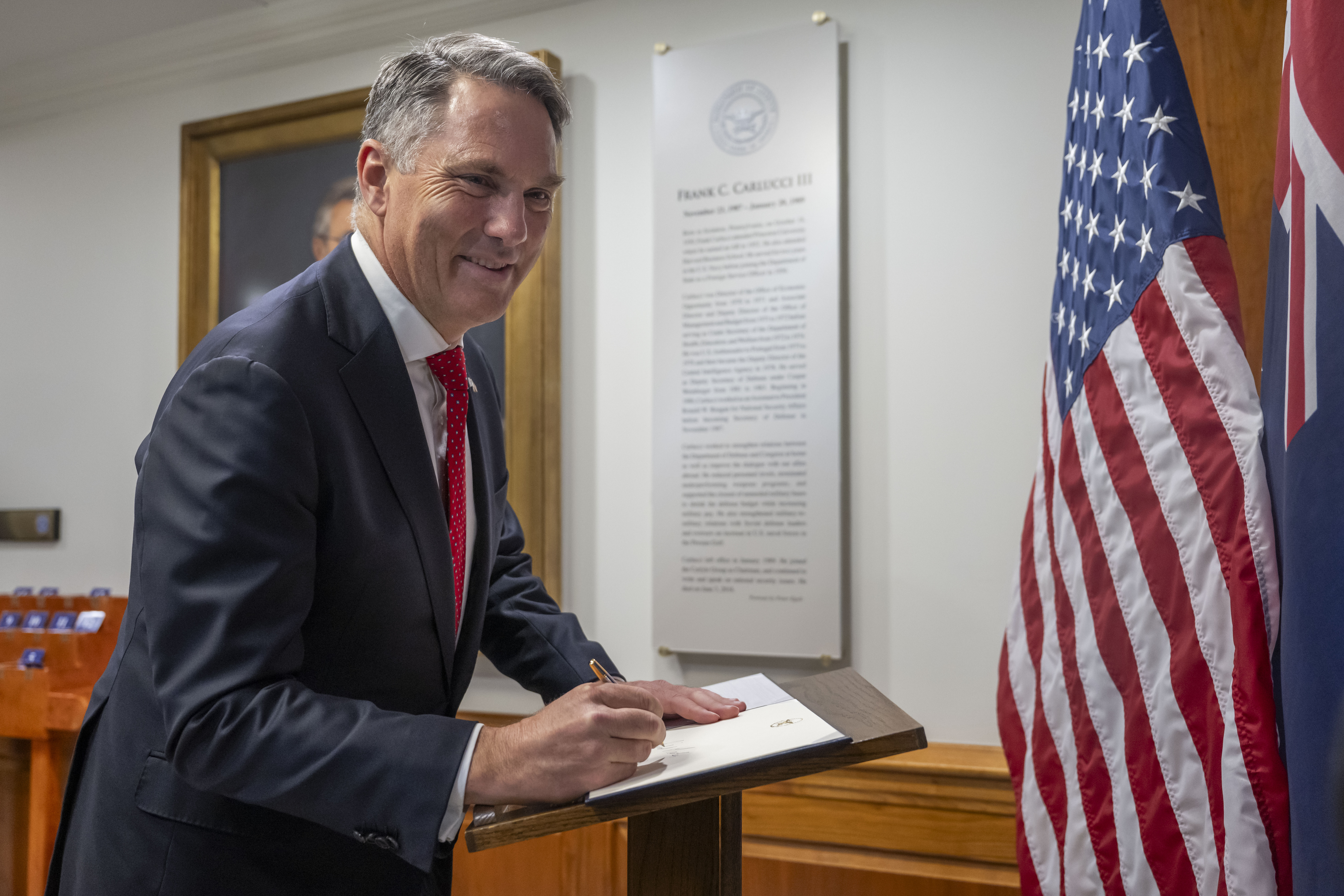
Marles visiting the Pentagon in Arlington, Virginia, United States, in February 2025

In June 2009 Marles was appointed Parliamentary Secretary for Innovation and Industry. He retained his seat in the 2010 election and was sworn in as Parliamentary Secretary for Pacific Island Affairs in the First Gillard Ministry on 14 September 2010. In July 2011, Marles became the first Australian member of parliament to visit Wallis and Futuna. Marles arrived in Wallis and Futuna to attend a ceremony with King Kapiliele Faupala in Mata-Utu marking the 50th anniversary of the islands' status as a French Overseas collectivity. Marles had previously visited New Caledonia in October 2010 and French Polynesia in March 2011.

In the ministerial reshuffle of 2 March 2012, Marles was given the additional role of Parliamentary Secretary for Foreign Affairs. On 21 March 2013 he resigned these roles after expressing support for Kevin Rudd to challenge Julia Gillard for the leadership; a challenge that did not eventuate.

In June 2013, he was appointed the Minister for Trade and a member of the Cabinet, succeeding Craig Emerson, who resigned following the June 2013 leadership spill that saw Kevin Rudd defeat Julia Gillard for leadership of the Labor Party.

=== Shadow minister ===
After the ALP's defeat at the 2013 federal election, Marles was appointed Shadow Minister for Immigration and Border Protection under opposition leader Bill Shorten. In February 2016, he began co-hosting the weekly television program Pyne & Marles on Sky News Live with Liberal MP Christopher Pyne. Marles had his portfolio changed after the 2016 election, becoming Shadow Minister for Defence.

=== Deputy Leader of the Opposition ===
In May 2019, after Labor lost the 2019 federal election, it was reported that Marles would stand for the deputy leadership of the party, and would likely be elected unopposed following Clare O'Neil's decision not to run. He was formally endorsed as deputy to Anthony Albanese on 30 May, and selected the portfolio of Defence in the shadow cabinet.

Following a shadow cabinet reshuffle in January 2021, Marles was placed in charge of a new "super portfolio" relating to recovery from the COVID-19 pandemic, encompassing a "broad brief across national reconstruction, jobs, skills, small business and science".

=== Deputy Prime Minister and Defence Minister ===
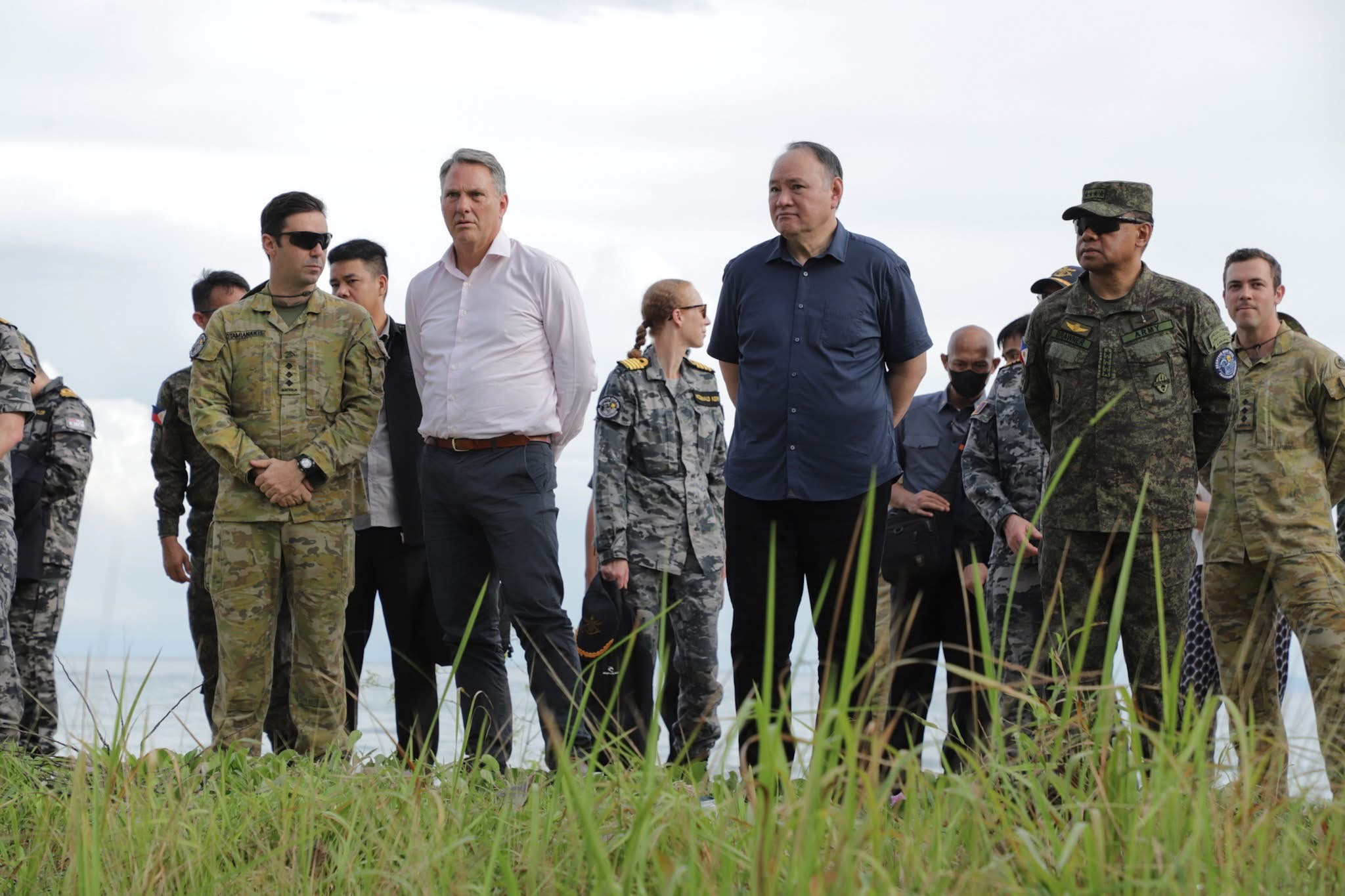
Marles and Philippine Defence Secretary Gilbert Teodoro witness joint Australia–Philippine military exercises in San Vicente, Palawan, Philippines, in August 2025

Two days after the 2022 federal election, Albanese had himself, Marles and three other senior Labor frontbenchers sworn in as an interim five-person government. Although counting was still underway, it was apparent by this time that no other party could realistically form even a minority government. As Albanese flew to Tokyo to take part in the Quad soon after being sworn in, Marles served as Acting Prime Minister until Albanese returned to lead the nation full-time. He continues to return to the role whenever Albanese leaves the country.

On 1 June 2022, Marles was sworn in as Deputy Prime Minister of Australia and Minister for Defence. One of his early decisions was relocating 500 Australian troops to Townsville over the course of six years from 2025 to strengthen the Australian Army's ability to conduct operations missions in the Pacific. This announcement was criticised by the city's mayor Jenny Hill who claimed that Townsville City Council was not consulted about military personnel's housing. On 29 September 2023, Marles announced that the Australian Defence Force would retire its fleet of MRH-90 Taipan helicopters following a fatal crash during Exercise Talisman Sabre in July 2023 which killed four military personnel.

In September 2023, Albanese and Philippine President Bongbong Marcos agreed to have their respective defence ministers (Marles and Gilbert Teodoro) meet annually due to "rising security challenges" in the Indo-Pacific.

In early February 2024, Marles and Foreign Minister Penny Wong hosted New Zealand Foreign Minister Winston Peters and Defence Minister Judith Collins at a joint bilateral meeting of foreign and defence ministers in Melbourne. Marles confirmed that Australia would send officials to brief their New Zealand counterparts about AUKUS Pillar Two, which would focus on advanced military technology including quantum computing and artificial intelligence. New Zealand is not expected to join AUKUS Pillar One due to its nuclear-free policy. The two governments also agreed to deepen bilateral security and military cooperation.

On 6 May 2024, Marles denounced an incident in which a Chinese J-10 fighter jet dropped flares in close proximity to an Australian MH60R Seahawk helicopter. The helicopter had been operating off HMAS Hobart in international waters in the Yellow Sea while enforcing United Nations-mandated sanctions against North Korea.

On 19 June 2024, Marles, Wong and Minister for International Development and the Pacific Pat Conroy attended the 30th Australia-Papua New Guinea Ministerial Forum in Port Moresby. During the visit, Marles acknowledged the 2024 Enga landslide that occurred in late May 2024 and confirmed that the Australian delegation would travel there. The Albanese government also confirmed plans to sign a bilateral security agreement with Papua New Guinea.

On 11 July 2024, Marles announced that Australia would provide Ukraine with $250 million in military assistance, the largest single military package from Australia to Ukraine since the Russian invasion of Ukraine in 2022.

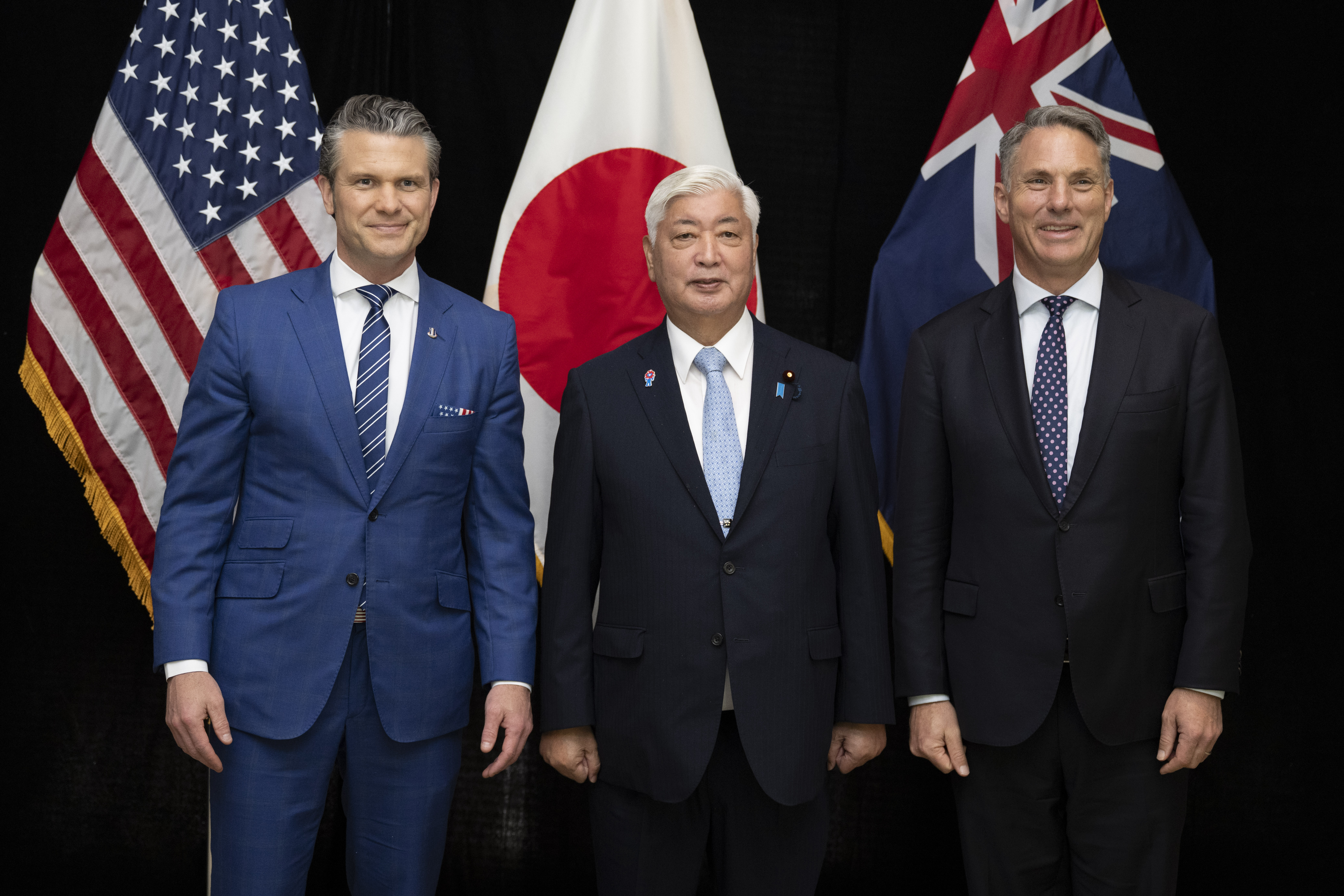
Marles with US Secretary of Defense Pete Hegseth and Japanese Minister of Defense Gen Nakatani in May 2025

On 12 September 2024, Marles stripped nine commanding officers who served in the War in Afghanistan of their distinguished service medals, implementing the final recommendation of the Brereton Report which had found "credible evidence" that Australian soldiers had unlawfully killed 39 people.

On 20 February 2025, Marles and his New Zealand counterpart Collins confirmed that the Australian and New Zealand militaries were monitoring three Chinese warships that were sailing through Australia's exclusive economic zone near Sydney. After the Chinese warships commenced live-fire exercises in the Tasman Sea, Marles criticised the Chinese government for not giving the Australian government prior notice of the first live fire exercise, describing them as "disconcerting for planes that were in the air." Australian civil aviation and defence authorities had only learnt about the exercise ten minutes after initial contact between the Chinese warships and a Virgin Australia pilot nearby.

After US Defense Secretary Pete Hegseth initiated a review of AUKUS, Marles stated that it was "totally understandable" that an incoming government would like to conduct a review. In July 2025, Marles and UK Defense Minister John Healey signed a fifty-year nuclear submarine treaty.

In 2025, the Albanese government was criticized for supplying parts for F-35 fighter jets to the global supply chain that can be accessed by Israel. Marles said that Australia was part of the F-35 supply chains "that are organised by Lockheed Martin in the United States and have multiple supplies in respect of all of those supply chains."

On 24 August 2025, Marles witnessed the 2025 Exercise Amphibious and Land Operations (ALON) military exercises between Australian and Philippine forces held in Palawan, Philippines, which involved over 3,600 personnel—Australia's largest deployment of troops to Southeast Asia since the 2006 crisis in Timor-Leste. Marles said that the exercises intend to "uphold the rules-based order in this [Indo-Pacific] region." He also announced that a new defence pact between Australia and the Philippines will be signed in 2026.

In April 2026, Marles announced the sell-off of 67 military bases to raise $3 billion for the Defence Department, $1.8 billion after site remediation is paid for. The chosen bases included all three historic Victoria Barracks's (Victoria Barracks, Sydney, Victoria Barracks, Brisbane and Victoria Barracks, Melbourne) and the home of the Royal Australian Air Force RAAF Point Cook. On 7 October he made the statement “It is not my priority for Defence to be a heritage organisation. It's not my priority to see Defence manage the oldest wine cellar in Australia.” In a response to the Premier of New South Wales Chris Minns announced that he is backing increased heritage protection of the Barracks and other defence sits.

== Political positions ==
Marles is a senior figure in his state's Labor Right faction.

=== Refugees and asylum seekers ===
Marles supports the turning back of asylum seekers who arrive in Australia by boat and a Pacific Solution for the resettlement of refugees.

Marles was supportive of the Australian War Memorial commemorating Operation Sovereign Borders navy personnel who undertook activities to stop asylum seekers coming to Australia by boat. That position was criticised by several Labor Left MPs as well as the Greens.

=== National defence ===
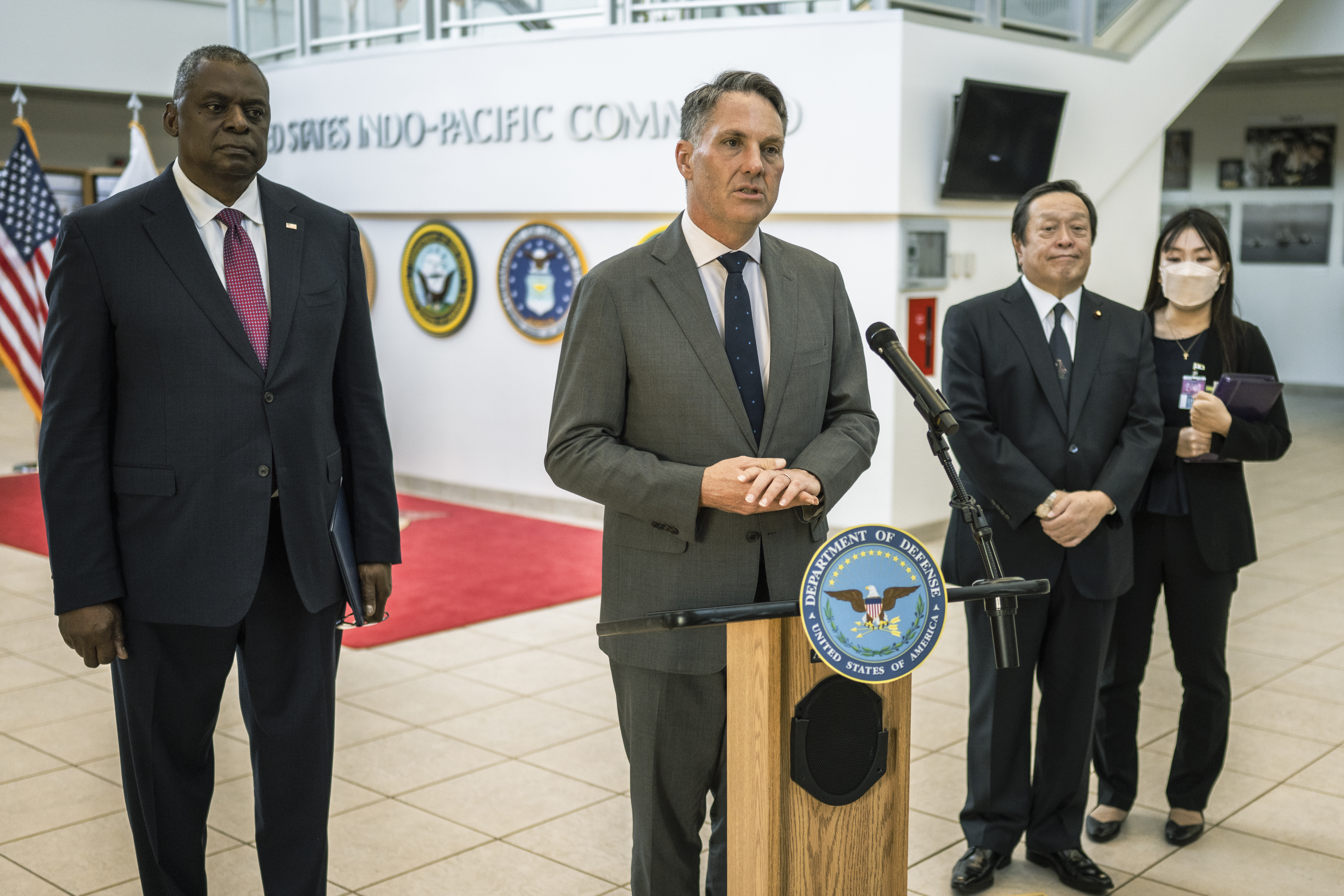
Marles (center) speaks with US Secretary of Defense Lloyd Austin (left) and Japanese Minister of Defense Yasukazu Hamada (right) in 2022

In 2020, as shadow defence minister, Marles was critical of the Morrison government's handling of the programme to purchase French submarines, which, he said, had "profoundly compromised" Australia's national security. Marles otherwise supported the bipartisan consensus on national defence matters.

He has been cited as holding pro-U.S. views and as "somewhat of a hawk".

=== Fossil fuels and energy ===
On an interview on Sky News on 20 February 2019, Marles stated that it would be "a good thing" if the thermal coal market in Australia collapsed. He later back-tracked on this statement, saying that his "attack on coal was tone-deaf".

Following the 2019 Federal Election, Marles maintained that public funds should not be used to subsidise coal, saying "a Labor government is not going to put a cent into subsidising coal-fired power", and the market should be allowed to make its own decisions, while also saying that if a private company decided to push forward with a mine and gained the necessary approvals that Labor would not stand in its way.

== Personal life ==
Marles lives in Geelong with his wife Rachel Schutze. He has three children from his current marriage and one from his first marriage to Lisa Neville, who was elected to the Victorian Legislative Assembly in 2002 and later became a state minister.

Marles is a supporter and member of the Geelong Football Club.

Parliament of Australia
Preceded by Gavan O'Connor	Member of Parliament for Corio; 2007–present	Incumbent
Political offices
Preceded by Barnaby Joyce	Deputy Prime Minister of Australia; 2022–present	Incumbent
Preceded by Peter Dutton	Minister for Defence; 2022–present	Incumbent
Preceded by Stuart Robert	Minister for Employment; 2022	Succeeded by Tony Burke
Preceded by Tanya Plibersek	Deputy Leader of the Opposition; 2019–2022	Succeeded by Sussan Ley
Preceded by Craig Emerson	Minister for Trade; 2013	Succeeded by Andrew Robb
Vacant Title last held by Greg Hunt	Parliamentary Secretary for Foreign Affairs; 2012–2013	Vacant Title next held by Brett Mason
Vacant Title last held by Gordon Bilney as Minister for Development Cooperation and Pacific Island Affairs	Parliamentary Secretary for Pacific Island Affairs; 2010–2013	Succeeded by Matt Thistlethwaite
Party political offices
Preceded by Tanya Plibersek	Deputy Leader of the Labor Party; 2019–present	Incumbent
