= John Lister (Australian politician) =

Australian politician (1875–1935)

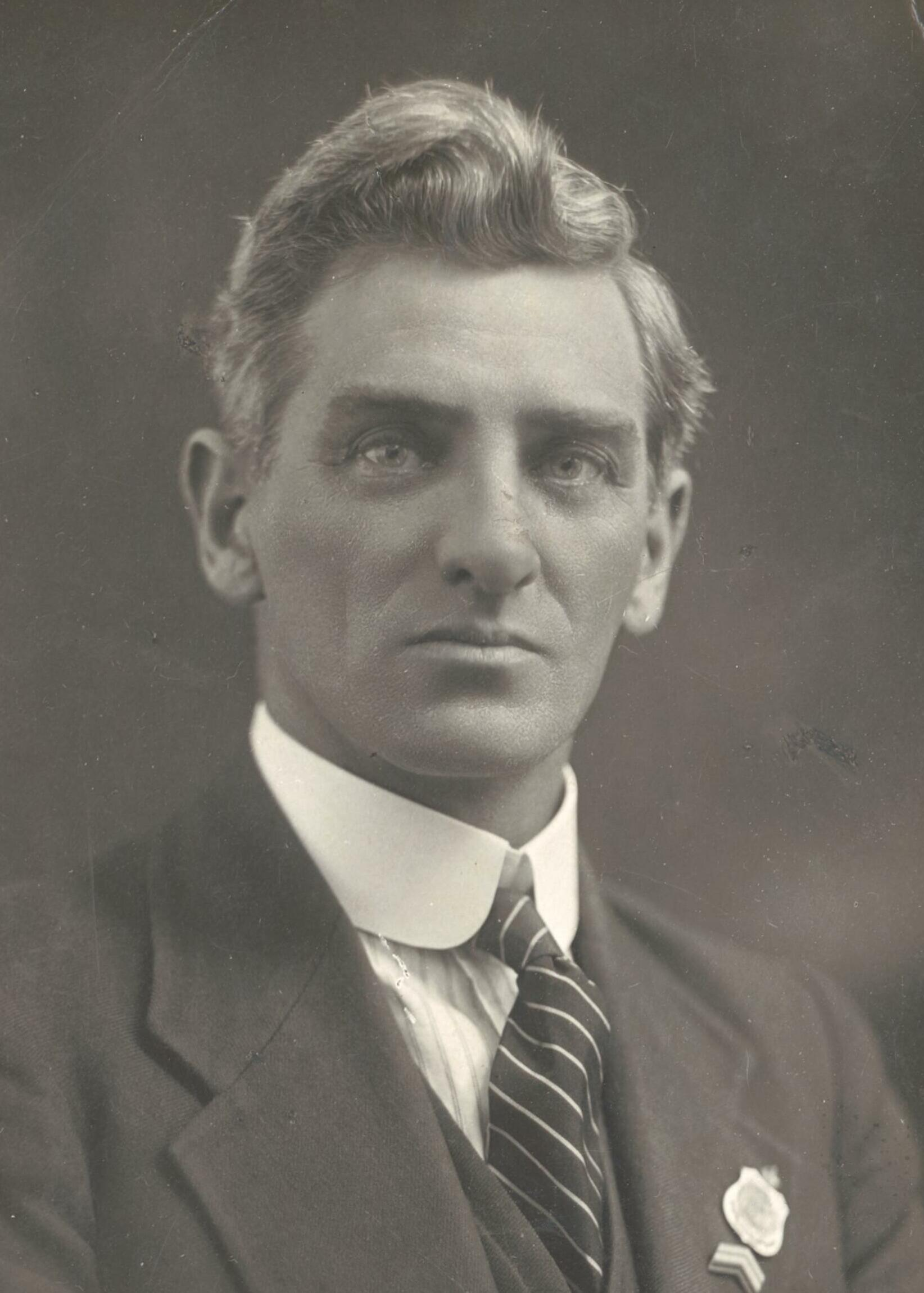

Member of the Australian Parliament for Corio
- In office 5 May 1917 – 12 October 1929
- Preceded by: Alfred Ozanne
- Succeeded by: Arthur Lewis

Personal details
- Born: 13 May 1875 Lincolnshire, England
- Died: 4 October 1935 (aged 60) Toowoomba, Queensland, Australia
- Party: Nationalist Party of Australia
- Occupation: Farmer

John Henry Lister (13 May 1875 – 4 October 1935) was an Australian politician. He was a Nationalist Party member of the Australian House of Representatives from 1917 to 1929.

Lister was born in Lincolnshire in England and was educated there at Wesley School before migrating to Australia with his family in 1889, his family settling in Queensland, first in the Blackall Range and then in 1900 at Thornville. Lister himself then took up land at Wutul near Toowoomba.

Lister enlisted in the military on 19 November 1914 and embarked for service in World War I with the 2nd Light Horse Field Ambulance. He served in the Gallipoli Campaign, in Egypt and the Sinai Peninsula and attained the rank of sergeant but fell ill with pneumonia and pleurisy in 1916 and was repatriated to Australia and discharged as medically unfit. He subsequently moved to Victoria, where his wife and son had moved during his war service, and became involved in recruitment efforts for the war. Lister had been a member of the Australian Labor Party, but being a supporter of conscription left the party in the 1916 Labor split, together with many other Labor members and MPs, and ended up in the new Nationalist Party of Australia.

In 1917, he was elected as a Nationalist to the Australian House of Representatives as the member for Corio, defeating Labor MP Alfred Ozanne in a campaign centred on the interests of soldiers and his war service. He stated during the campaign that he would consider re-enlisting and resigning if his health improved sufficiently. He was the first returned serviceman from World War I to sit in parliament. He held the seat until his defeat in 1929. He attempted to win preselection to regain Corio in 1931, but was dropped in favour of Richard Casey; an attempt to recontest as an independent United Australia candidate was unsuccessful.

In 1932, he moved back to his farm at Wutul in Queensland, but sold the farm and moved to live in Toowoomba in May 1934. He died at Toowoomba in 1935.

Parliament of Australia
Preceded by Alfred Ozanne	Member for Corio; 1917–1929	Succeeded by Arthur Lewis
