= Alfred Ozanne =

Australian politician (1877–1961)

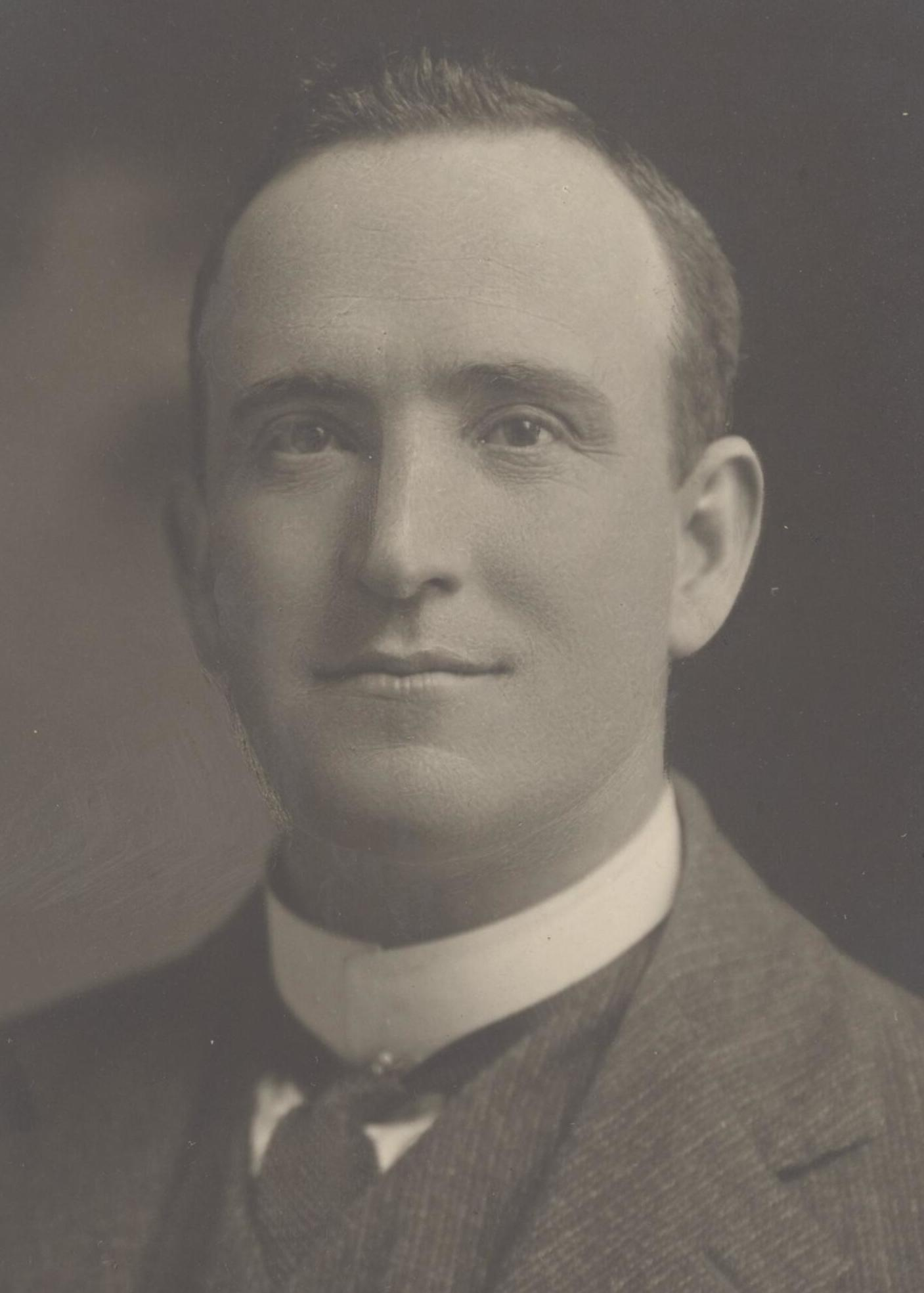

Member of the Australian Parliament for Corio
- In office 13 April 1910 – 31 May 1913
- Preceded by: Richard Crouch
- Succeeded by: William Kendell
- In office 5 September 1914 – 5 May 1917
- Preceded by: William Kendell
- Succeeded by: John Lister

Personal details
- Born: 1877 Melbourne, Victoria, Australia
- Died: 27 May 1961 (aged 83–84) Brighton, Victoria, Australia
- Party: Labor
- Spouse: Edith Stewart (nee Moody)
- Children: George, Myra, Alan, Alfred
- Occupation: Accountant

Alfred Thomas Montgomery Madden Ozanne (1877 – 27 May 1961) was an Australian politician. He was an Australian Labor Party member of the Australian House of Representatives from 1910 to 1913 and 1914 to 1917, both times for the seat of Corio.

== Early life ==
Born in Melbourne, he was the son of Marcel Charles Ozanne, a Frenchman, and his wife Emilia Josephine Reinhardt. He had one brother and three sisters. Ozanne married Edith Stewart Moody in 1900, and they had four children, all born at Werribee. He had been an accountant and municipal officer before entering politics. He was the bookkeeper for the Melbourne and Metropolitan Board of Works' Werribee Sewage Farm at the time of his election.

== Politics ==
Ozanne was elected to the House of Representatives at the 1910 federal election, defeating Liberal Richard Crouch. He lost his seat to Liberal William Kendell at the 1913 election and served as secretary of Labor's Corio campaign council while again out of parliament. He returned to parliament at the 1914 election, defeating Kendell.

=== Controversy, defeat and aftermath ===
He volunteered for service in World War I in January 1916 while an MP; attended officer training at Tidworth, was promoted to lieutenant and was briefly attached to the Australian military offices in London before returning to camp at Larkhill. He was declared "unfit for further service" in January 1917 and was invalided home after visiting the front as a civilian in his capacity as an MP. However, in April, he was reported to have been absent without leave when his unit departed from the front in November 1916, and both media and his political opponents suggested that he had been "protected by headquarters", that would have been court-martialled had he not been discharged, and that he had pretended to have been on service in his letters during his visit to the front.

He was defeated re-contesting his seat at the 1917 election after the opposition refused to allow him to run uncontested due to the controversy over his war service; Ozanne attributed his defeat to the reporting of the affair. He sued the Geelong Advertiser for libel in 1920 but lost when it was held their coverage had been "substantially true".

== Later life ==
Ozanne was declared insolvent in 1923, in part due to the legal costs of the libel case. At that time, he worked as a clerk and resided in the Melbourne suburb of Albert Park. He had moved to Brighton by 1935.

Ozanne suffered serious injuries in a fall at the Middle Park railway station on 31 December 1959. He died at Brighton, Melbourne, on 27 May 1961 and was cremated at Springvale Cemetery. He was the last surviving MP who served during Andrew Fisher's second tenure as prime minister.

Parliament of Australia
Preceded by Richard Crouch	Member for Corio; 1910–1913	Succeeded by William Kendell
Preceded by William Kendell	Member for Corio; 1914–1917	Succeeded by John Lister
