= Division of Corio =

Australian federal electoral division

Coordinates: 37.997°S 144.381°E

Corio Australian House of Representatives Division
- Interactive map of electorate boundaries from the 2025 federal election
- Created: 1901
- MP: Richard Marles
- Party: Labor
- Namesake: Corio Bay
- Electors: 122,829 (2025)
- Area: 1,216 km^{2} (469.5 sq mi)
- Demographic: Provincial

The Division of Corio (/kəraɪoʊ/) is an Australian electoral division in the state of Victoria. The division was proclaimed in 1900, and was one of the original 65 divisions to be contested at the first federal election. Named for Corio Bay, it has always been based on the city of Geelong, although in the past it stretched as far east as the outer western suburbs of Melbourne.

The current Member for Corio, since the 2007 federal election, is Richard Marles, the current Deputy Prime Minister of Australia.

== History ==
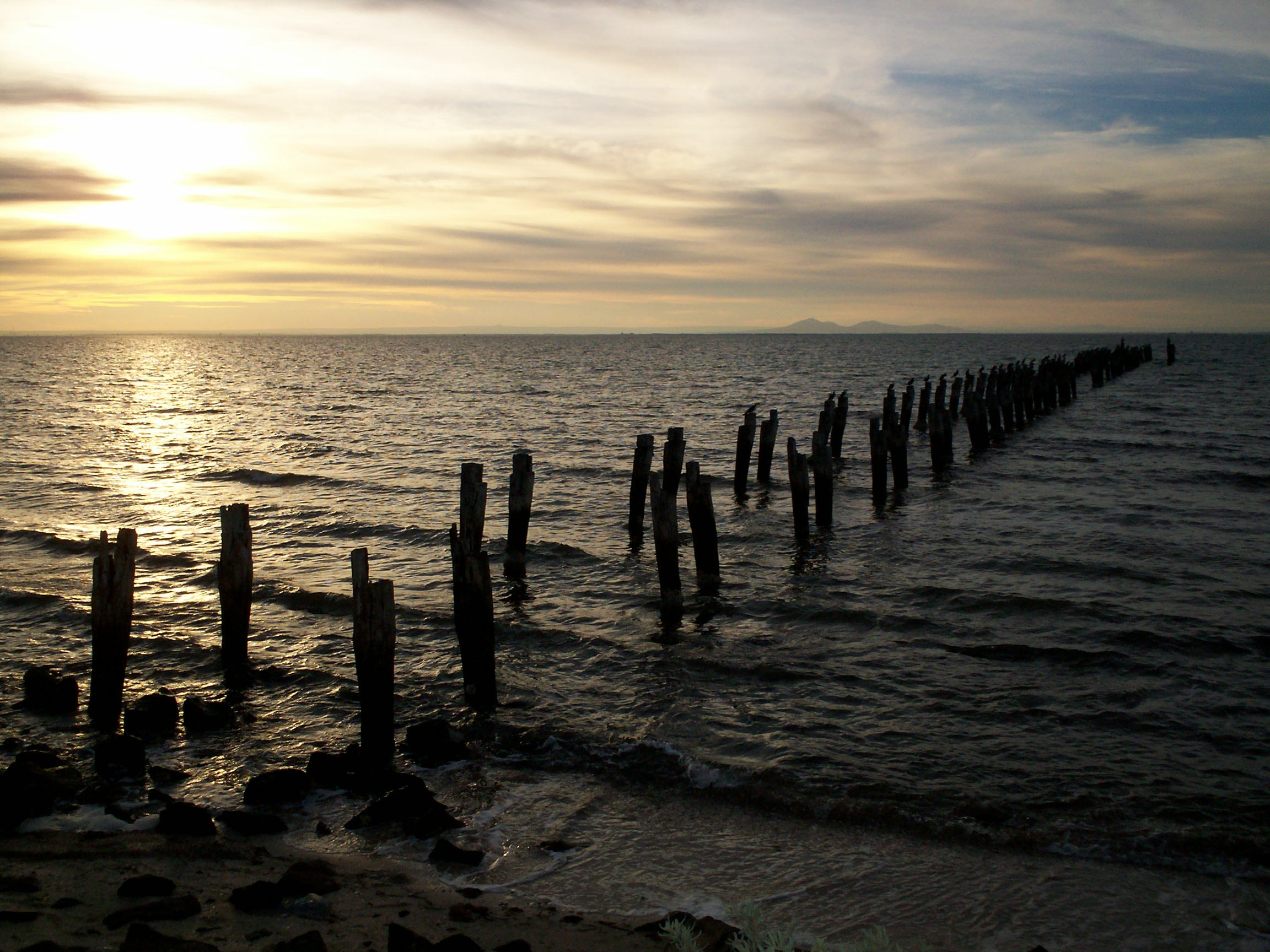
Corio Bay, the division's namesake

For most of the first seven decades after Federation, it was a marginal seat that frequently changed hands between the Australian Labor Party and the conservative parties. However, Labor has held it without interruption since a 1967 by-election, and since the 1980s it has been one of Labor's safest non-metropolitan seats. Presently, the Liberal Party need a near 13 percent swing to win it.

Its most prominent members have been Richard Casey, a leading Cabinet member in the 1930s and later Governor-General; John Dedman, a Chifley government minister; Hubert Opperman, a former cycling champion and a minister in the Menzies government; and Gordon Scholes, who was Speaker during the Whitlam government and a minister in the Hawke government.

== Boundaries ==
Since 1984, federal electoral division boundaries in Australia have been determined at redistributions by a redistribution committee appointed by the Australian Electoral Commission. Redistributions occur for the boundaries of divisions in a particular state, and they occur every seven years, or sooner if a state's representation entitlement changes or when divisions of a state are malapportioned.

When the division was proclaimed in 1900, it covered the Geelong, Bellarine Peninsula and the Surf Coast areas, and also covered areas west and north-west of Melbourne, such as Bacchus Marsh, Melton, Macedon, Gisborne and Sunbury. The division also extended relatively close to the City of Melbourne, stopping short of Spotswood and Williamstown west of the Yarra River. In 1906, with the abolition of Division of Corinella, it also included Ballan and Gordon, but lost Gisborne and Macedon to the Division of Mernda.

In 1913, with the abolition of Division of Mernda, the division of Corio regained Gisborne and Macedon, and was also expanded to cover the north of Melbourne, including Wallan, Whittlesea, Wollert, Epping, Yan Yean and Plenty. The division also began to neighbour the Division of Flinders at the Diamond Valley area (Eltham, Research and Hurstbridge). Together with Flinders, both divisions formed a ring that completely surrounded Melbourne, stretching from Surf Coast on one end to Bass Coast on the other.

Also in 1913, the division also gained areas north-west of Geelong, such as Bannockburn, Teesdale and Inverloch. However, it also lost areas immediately west of the City of Melbourne, such as St Albans and Altona North. The loss of these areas were mostly reversed in 1922, and also gaining Sunshine. The division also expanded towards the City of Melbourne from the north as well, stopping short of Essendon and Maribyrnong.

In 1937, the areas around Whittlesea, Yan Yean and Plenty were lost to the new Division of Deakin. In 1949, the division was massively shrunk to a quarter of its area size, losing all areas outside of the Geelong, Bellarine Peninsula and the Surf Coast to the new Division of Lalor, effectively splitting the old division into Lalor and a much smaller Corio. Since then until present (as of 2025), the division of Corio would only be based around these areas, occasionally gaining and losing surrounding areas in redistributions.

As of the 2024 redistribution, the division comprises an area of 1,216 square kilometres (470 sq mi) from the western shores of Port Phillip Bay, stretching to the north of Geelong and inland. As of 2013, besides Geelong, it included Avalon, Bannockburn, Bell Park, Bell Post Hill, Belmont, Breakwater, Corio, Drumcondra, Fyansford, East Geelong, North Geelong, South Geelong, Geelong West, Hamlyn Heights, Herne Hill, Highton, Lara, Lovely Banks, Manifold Heights, Moolap, Newcomb, Norlane, North Shore, Portarlington, St Albans Park, Rippleside and Whittington; and parts of Anakie, Batesford, Clifton Springs, Fyansford, Leopold, Newtown, and Thomson.

== Members ==
Image	Member	Party	Term	Notes
	Richard Crouch (1868–1949)	Protectionist	29 March 1901 – 26 May 1909	Lost seat. Later elected to the Division of Corangamite in 1929
	Richard Crouch (1868–1949)	Liberal	26 May 1909 – 13 April 1910	Lost seat. Later elected to the Division of Corangamite in 1929
	Alfred Ozanne (1877–1961)	Labor	13 April 1910 – 31 May 1913	Lost seat
	William Kendell (1851–1922)	Liberal	31 May 1913 – 5 September 1914	Lost seat. Later elected to the Victorian Legislative Council in 1916
	Alfred Ozanne (1877–1961)	Labor	5 September 1914 – 5 May 1917	Lost seat
	John Lister (1875–1935)	Nationalist	5 May 1917 – 12 October 1929	Lost seat
	Arthur Lewis (1882–1975)	Labor	12 October 1929 – 19 December 1931	Lost seat
	Richard Casey (1890–1976)	United Australia	19 December 1931 – 30 January 1940	Served as minister under Lyons, Page and Menzies. Resigned to become the Australian Ambassador to the United States. Later elected to the Division of La Trobe in 1949
	John Dedman (1896–1973)	Labor	2 March 1940 – 10 December 1949	Served as minister under Curtin, Forde and Chifley. Lost seat
	Hubert Opperman (1904–1996)	Liberal	10 December 1949 – 10 June 1967	Served as Chief Government Whip in the House under Menzies. Served as minister under Menzies and Holt. Resigned to become the High Commissioner to Malta
	Gordon Scholes (1931–2018)	Labor	22 July 1967 – 8 February 1993	Served as Speaker during the Whitlam and Fraser Governments. Served as minister under Hawke. Retired
	Gavan O'Connor (1947–)	Labor	13 March 1993 – 18 October 2007	Lost preselection and then lost seat
	Gavan O'Connor (1947–)	Independent	18 October 2007 – 24 November 2007	Lost preselection and then lost seat
	Richard Marles (1967–)	Labor	24 November 2007 – present	Served as minister under Rudd. Incumbent. Currently a minister and Deputy Prime Minister under Albanese

== Election results ==
2025 Australian federal election: Corio
Party	Candidate	Votes	%	±%
Labor	Richard Marles	47,221	42.84	+0.94
Liberal	Darren Buller	27,423	24.88	−0.14
Greens	Emilie Flynn	17,491	15.87	+1.09
One Nation	Adam Helman	10,953	9.94	+6.02
Independent	John De Lorenzo	3,930	3.57	+3.57
Socialist Alliance	Sarah Hathway	3,209	2.91	+0.52
Total formal votes		110,227	96.84	+2.04
Informal votes		3,593	3.16	−2.04
Turnout		113,820	92.72	+2.59
Two-party-preferred result
Labor	Richard Marles	69,698	63.23	+0.74
Liberal	Darren Buller	40,529	36.77	−0.74
Labor hold		Swing	+0.74	
