= Gordon Scholes =

Australian politician (1931–2018)

The Honourable Gordon Scholes AO
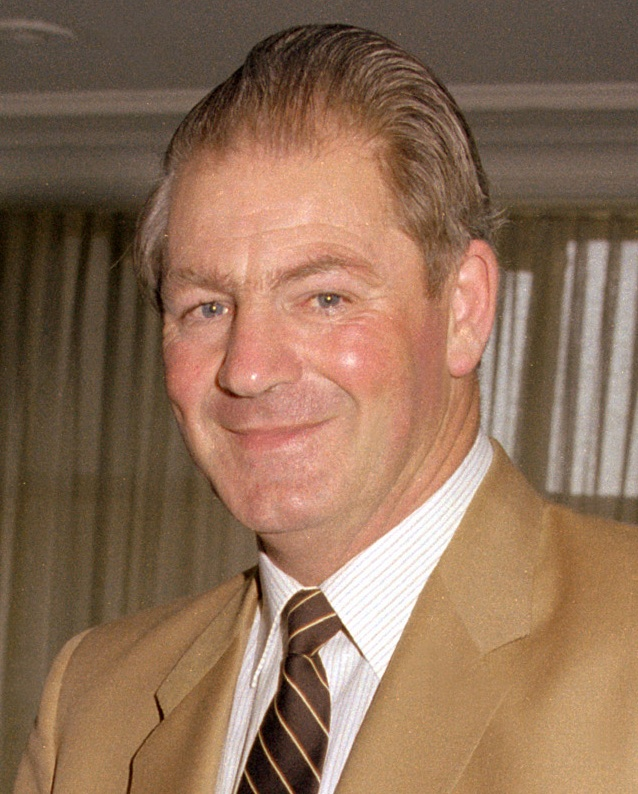
- Scholes in 1983

Minister for Territories
- In office 13 December 1984 – 24 July 1987
- Prime Minister: Bob Hawke
- Preceded by: Tom Uren
- Succeeded by: John Brown

Minister for Defence
- In office 11 March 1983 – 13 December 1984
- Prime Minister: Bob Hawke
- Preceded by: Ian Sinclair
- Succeeded by: Kim Beazley

Manager of Opposition Business
- In office 16 February 1976 – 29 December 1977
- Leader: Gough Whitlam (1976-77); Bill Hayden (1977)
- Preceded by: Ian Sinclair
- Succeeded by: Mick Young

Speaker of the House of Representatives
- In office 27 February 1975 – 11 November 1975
- Preceded by: Jim Cope
- Succeeded by: Sir Billy Snedden

Member of the Australian Parliament for Corio
- In office 22 July 1967 – 8 February 1993
- Preceded by: Hubert Opperman
- Succeeded by: Gavan O'Connor

Personal details
- Born: Gordon Glen Denton Scholes; 7 June 1931 Melbourne, Victoria, Australia
- Died: 9 December 2018 (aged 87) Geelong, Victoria, Australia
- Party: Labor
- Spouse: Della K. Robinson

Gordon Glen Denton Scholes AO (7 June 1931 – 9 December 2018) was an Australian politician. He was a member of the Australian Labor Party (ALP) and served in the House of Representatives from 1967 to 1993, representing the Division of Corio. He served terms as Speaker of the House of Representatives (1975), Minister for Defence (1983–1984), and Minister for Territories (1984–1987).

== Early life ==
Scholes was born on 7 June 1931 in West Melbourne, Victoria. He was the only child of Mary Louisa (née O'Brien) and Thomas Glen Denton Scholes; his father was a railway worker and his mother was a psychiatric nurse.

Scholes had a turbulent childhood. He spent two long periods in hospital, once at the age of three following a car accident and again at the age of fourteen following a bout of rheumatic fever. His father enlisted in the military in 1941 and was injured while fighting in New Guinea, subsequently becoming a long-term patient at Heidelberg Repatriation Hospital. Scholes stayed with relatives in various locations around Victoria while his mother worked at a munitions factory, attending twelve different schools. He eventually settled in Daylesford where his mother's aunt lived, attending Daylesford Technical High School to the age of fifteen.

After leaving school, Scholes worked at the Daylesford Woollen Mills while training as a fitter and turner at the Ballarat School of Mines. He subsequently joined the Victorian Railways where his father and grandfather had worked, working his way from engine-cleaner to fireman to engine-driver, including on the Spirit of Progress between Melbourne and Sydney. He joined the Australian Federated Union of Locomotive Employees (AFULE) and after settling in Geelong became the union's delegate to the local trades hall. He was also a talented amateur boxer and in 1949 became the amateur heavyweight champion of Victoria.

== Politics ==
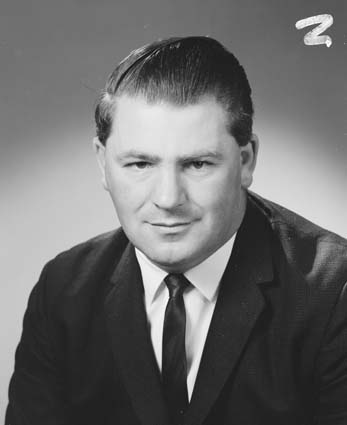
Scholes in 1968.

Scholes joined the ALP in 1954 and was elected president of its Geelong branch in 1962. He served as Bob Hawke's campaign manager in the seat of Corio, based on Geelong, at the 1963 federal election. In 1965, he was elected to the Geelong City Council and as president of the Geelong Trades Hall.

Scholes was the Labor Party candidate in Corio in the 1966 election, and was defeated by incumbent Liberal Sir Hubert Opperman. However, Opperman resigned a few months after the election to become Australia's first High Commissioner to Malta. Scholes won the seat at the ensuing by-election on a swing of 11 percent. He won the seat in his own right at the 1969 election, the first time that the non-Labor parties had won government without winning Corio.

Scholes faced spirited Liberal challenges in the 1970s, the height of the longstanding Victorian state Liberal government's popularity. Indeed, he was nearly defeated in the federal Coalition's landslides of 1975 and 1977. However, he picked up a large swing in 1980 which he consolidated in 1983. He would never face another close race, and turned Corio into one of Labor's safest non-metropolitan seats.

=== Speaker of the House ===
Scholes served as Speaker from 27 February 1975 until 16 February 1976, a period taken up almost entirely by the 1975 Australian constitutional crisis. On 11 November 1975, following the dismissal of the Prime Minister, Gough Whitlam, by the Governor-General, Sir John Kerr, and the appointment by Kerr of the Leader of the Opposition, Malcolm Fraser, as caretaker Prime Minister, the House of Representatives passed a motion of no confidence in the Fraser government, by 10 votes. The no confidence motion also called on the Governor-General to reinstate the Whitlam government. As Speaker, Scholes was charged with conveying that resolution of the House to the Governor-General and to request Kerr to dismiss Fraser and re-appoint Whitlam. Kerr refused to see the Speaker or to recognise the motion of no confidence in the Fraser government by the House of Representatives, keeping Scholes waiting for more than an hour. By the time the Governor-General agreed to see Scholes, Kerr had already dissolved the Parliament on Fraser's advice, which was something Fraser had undertaken to do once he had secured passage of the Supply bills through the Senate. Scholes later accused Kerr of bad faith for making an appointment to receive the Speaker shortly after 3pm, and then not waiting to hear from him before dissolving Parliament more than an hour later, with the appointed Prime Minister Malcolm Fraser still as Prime Minister, without the confidence of the House of Representatives.

=== Government minister ===
Scholes was Minister for Defence in the first Hawke Ministry from March 1983 to December 1984 and then Minister for Territories until July 1987. He retired before the 1993 election.

== Personal life and death ==
He was an honorary member of the Geelong Philatelic Society .

Gordon Scholes died on 9 December 2018, aged 87. A State Funeral was held on 18 December.

== Notes ==
Political offices
Preceded by Ian Sinclair	Australian Minister for Defence; 1983–1984	Succeeded by Kim Beazley
Preceded by Tom Uren	Australian Minister for Territories; 1984–1987	Succeeded by John Brown
Parliament of Australia
Preceded by Hubert Opperman	Member for Corio; 1967–1993	Succeeded by Gavan O'Connor
Preceded by Jim Cope	Speaker of the Australian House of Representatives; 1975–1976	Succeeded by Billy Snedden
