= Arthur Lewis (Australian politician) =

Australian politician (1882–1975)

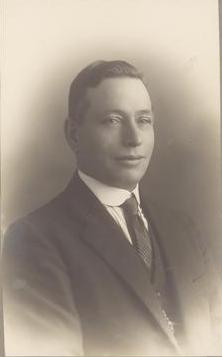

Member of the Australian Parliament for Corio
- In office 12 October 1929 – 19 December 1931
- Preceded by: John Lister
- Succeeded by: Richard Casey

Personal details
- Born: 22 April 1882 Melbourne, Victoria
- Died: 11 April 1975 (aged 92)
- Party: Australian Labor Party
- Occupation: Farm labourer

Arthur Lewis (22 April 1882 – 11 April 1975) was an Australian politician. Born in Melbourne, he received no formal education and was raised in an orphanage. He became a farm labourer and was secretary of the Victorian branch of the Carters and Drivers Union.

In 1929, he was elected to the Australian House of Representatives as the Labor member for Corio. He publicly supported the prohibition of alcohol, stating that he "regretted that it was not possible for the whole Labor Party to support prohibition". He was defeated in 1931.

After leaving federal politics, Lewis worked as a clerk with the Queensland Prohibition League. He made unsuccessful attempts at Labor preselection for the 1934 federal election, 1937 Victorian state election and 1940 federal election. Lewis died in 1975.

Parliament of Australia
Preceded by John Lister	Member for Corio; 1929 – 1931	Succeeded by Richard Casey
