= Gavan O'Connor =

Australian politician

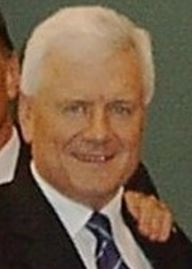
- O'Connor in 2005

Member of the Australian Parliament for Corio
- In office 13 March 1993 – 24 November 2007
- Preceded by: Gordon Scholes
- Succeeded by: Richard Marles

Personal details
- Born: 2 December 1947 (age 78) Colac, Victoria
- Party: Labor (1993–2007); Independent (2007)
- Occupation: Teacher

Gavan Michael O'Connor (born 2 December 1947) is an Australian politician who was an Australian Labor Party (ALP) member of the Australian House of Representatives from March 1993 to November 2007, representing the Division of Corio, Victoria.

== Career ==
=== Education ===
He was born in Colac, Victoria, and was educated at St Patrick's College, Ballarat, Monash University and the University of New England. He was a farmer, high school teacher, and member of the Colac City Council before entering Parliament.

=== Politics ===
He contested the 1984 Corangamite by-election but was unsuccessful as it was a safe Liberal seat. He won the seat of Corio at the 1993 federal election.

He became Parliamentary Secretary to the Leader of the Opposition (Kim Beazley) from 1996 to 1998 and Member of the Opposition Shadow Ministry from October 1998. He was Shadow Minister for Agriculture and Fisheries from December 2003 until 2007 when he was dropped in a shadow cabinet reshuffle by incoming leader Kevin Rudd.

O'Connor lost his endorsement as the ALP candidate for Corio to Richard Marles in March 2007. On 18 October the same year, he announced he would run as an independent at the 2007 election, and achieved 12.7 percent of the vote, but lost to Marles.

Parliament of Australia
Preceded by Gordon Scholes	Member for Corio; 1993–2007	Succeeded by Richard Marles
