= Richard Crouch =

Australian politician

The Honourable Richard Crouch
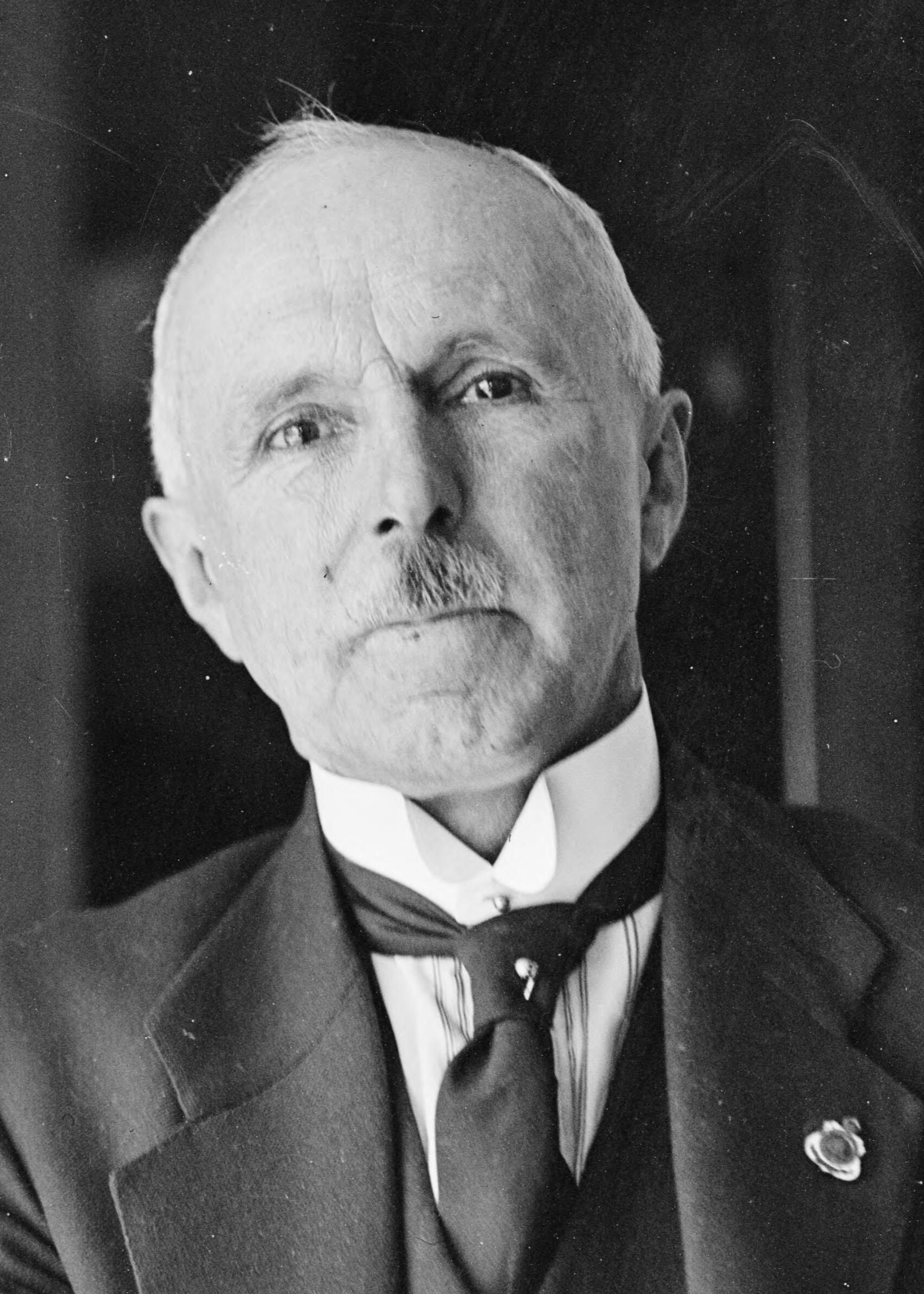

Member of the Australian Parliament for Corangamite
- In office 12 October 1929 – 19 December 1931
- Preceded by: William Gibson
- Succeeded by: William Gibson

Member of the Australian Parliament for Corio
- In office 29 March 1901 – 13 April 1910
- Preceded by: New seat
- Succeeded by: Alfred Ozanne

Personal details
- Born: 19 June 1868 Ballarat East, Victoria, Australia
- Died: 7 April 1949 (aged 80) Queenscliff, Victoria, Australia
- Party: Protectionist (1901–09); Liberal (1909–10); Labor (1929–31)
- Education: University of Melbourne
- Profession: Barrister and Solicitor

Richard Armstrong Crouch (19 June 1868 – 7 April 1949) was an Australian politician. His two periods as a member of the House of Representatives (1901–1910, 1929–1931) were separated by the First World War, during which he became an anti-conscription activist and changed his political affiliation. Crouch was a Protectionist and Liberal during his first period as an MP, but later became involved in the labour movement and represented the Australian Labor Party (ALP) during his second term. He is one of the few MPs to move to the ALP after previously belonging to an anti-Labor party.

== Early life ==
Crouch was born on 19 June 1868 in Ballarat East, Victoria. He was the son of Selina Durham (née Marks) and George Crouch. His mother was born in Aberdeen, Scotland, and his father was a miner and storekeeper from London who later became a "wealthy boot-retailer".

Crouch was raised in Ballarat, attending the state school at Mount Pleasant. He and his family moved to Melbourne in 1885 and in 1887 he enrolled in a course for articled clerks at the University of Melbourne. He was a prize-winning student and was admitted to practise law in 1892, subsequently working as a solicitor in Melbourne. He served on the executive of the Imperial Federation League and was also active in the Australian Natives' Association.

== Pre-war politics ==
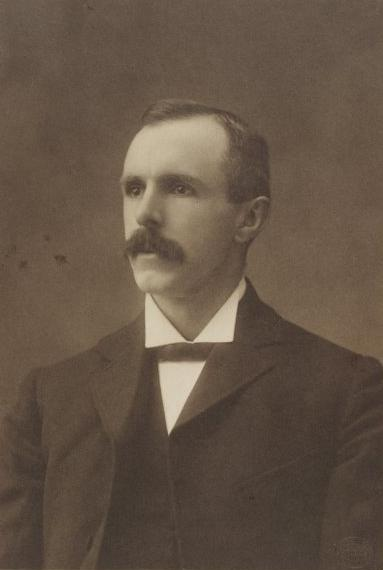
Crouch as a young MP

In 1901, Crouch was elected to the new Federal Parliament for the electorate of Corio, with a majority of 1,130 votes, as a member of the Protectionist Party (later the Commonwealth Liberal Party). He served for nine years, under the leadership of Alfred Deakin, and was at the time the youngest member of the lower house. He gained recognition as a wit and a radical, and was outspoken on the delicate matter of lavish allowances for the Governor General.

== World War I ==
Crouch enthusiastically supported new trends in Australian defence policies. He joined the militia in 1892, and by the outbreak of World War I had attained the rank of lieutenant colonel. In March 1915, he was given command of the 22nd Battalion, Australian Imperial Force, which landed at Gallipoli in September 1915. Crouch was transferred to command the Base Camp at Mudros in December 1915, but illness led to his return to Australia in March 1916.

Although a strong advocate for national defence, Crouch did not support the proposal to introduce compulsory overseas service. He became Victorian branch president of the Returned Soldiers' No-Conscription League, and campaigned against prime minister Billy Hughes during the conscription plebiscites in 1916 and 1917. Encouraged by James Scullin, Crouch joined the Labor Party and became an active leader of the Labor movement in Victoria.

== Post-war politics ==
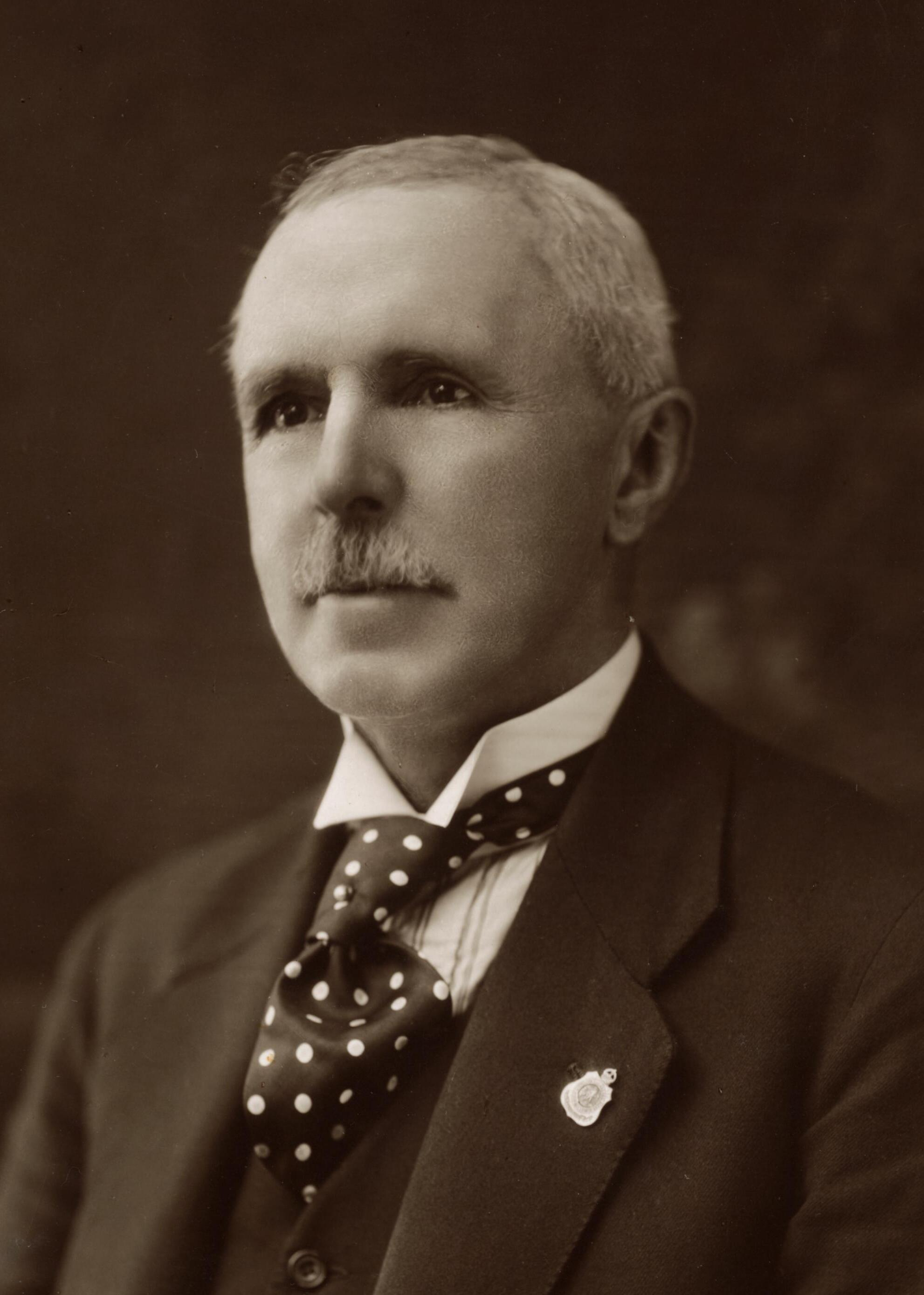
Crouch c. 1928

In 1924 Crouch represented Australia at the International Federation of Trade Unions Education Conference in Oxford. In 1929, he was re-elected to the federal parliament for the electorate of Corangamite, representing the Labor Party. Defeated two years later, he decided to forsake politics for philanthropy, travel, writing, and encouraging Australians to take a greater interest in their history. He was the donor of the first six busts at Prime Ministers Avenue at Ballarat, and bequeathed funds for maintaining the project.

== Personal life ==
Crouch remained unmarried during his lifetime and in his later years lived with his sister Gertrude at Point Lonsdale, Victoria in the house their father had built in 1882. He died aged 80 on 7 April 1949, leaving an estate valued at £43,490, and was buried at Point Lonsdale.

Parliament of Australia
Preceded by New seat	Member for Corio; 1901–1910	Succeeded by Alfred Ozanne
Preceded by William Gibson	Member for Corangamite; 1929–1931	Succeeded by William Gibson
