= 1977 Australian House of Representatives election =

This is a list of electoral division results for the Australian 1977 federal election.

== Overall ==
This section is an excerpt from 1977 Australian federal election § House of Representatives results

Government (86) Coalition Liberal (67) NCP (18) CLP (1) Opposition (38) Labor (38)

House of Reps (IRV) — 1977–80—Turnout 95.08% (CV) — Informal 2.52%
Party	Votes	%	Swing	Seats	Change
Liberal–NCP coalition	3,811,340	48.11	–4.95	86	–5
Liberal	3,017,896	38.09	−3.71	67	−1
National Country	776,982	9.81	−1.44	18	−4
Country Liberal	16,462	0.21	+0.00	1	0
Labor	3,141,051	39.65	−3.20	38	+2
Democrats	743,365	9.38	+9.38	0	0
Democratic Labor	113,271	1.43	+0.11	0	0
Progress	47,567	0.60	–0.18	0	0
Communist	14,098	0.18	+0.06	0	0
Socialist	1,895	0.02	+0.02	0	0
Independents	50,267	0.63	–0.19	0	0
Total	7,922,854			124	−3
Two-party-preferred (estimated)
Liberal–NCP coalition	Win	54.60	−1.10	86	–5
Labor		45.40	+1.10	38	+2

Popular vote
Labor	39.65%
Liberal	38.09%
National	10.01%
Democrats	9.38%
Other	2.87%

Two-party-preferred vote
Coalition	54.60%
Labor	45.40%

Parliament seats
Coalition	69.35%
Labor	30.65%

== New South Wales ==
1977 Australian federal election (New South Wales)
← 1975	10 December 1977	1980 →

All 43 NSW seats in the House of Representatives 22 seats needed for a majority
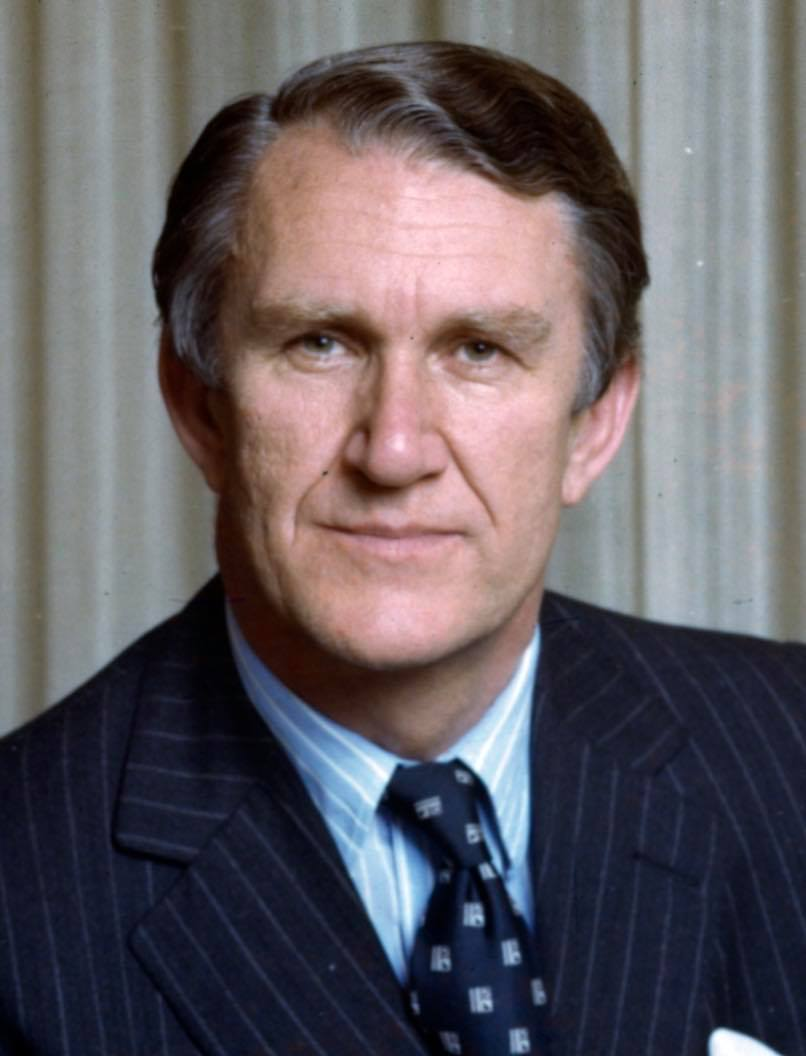

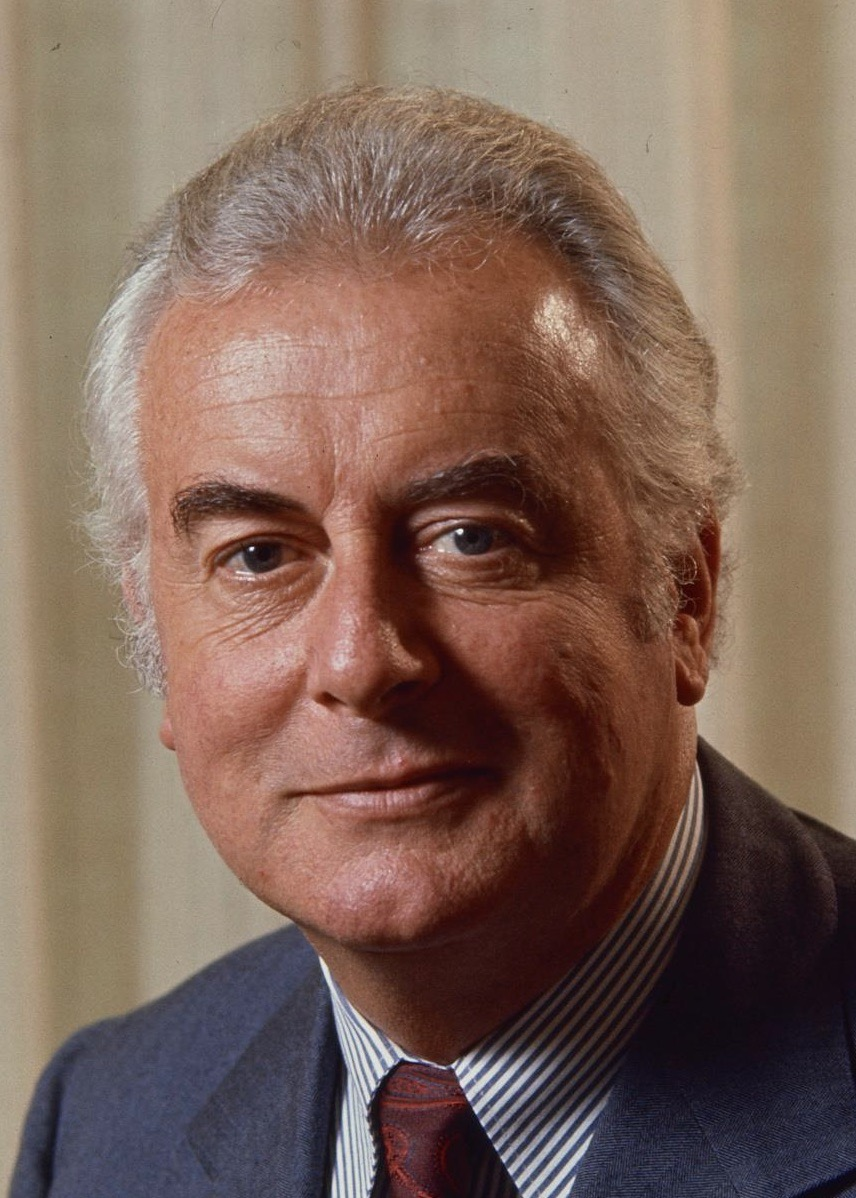
	First party	Second party
Leader	Malcolm Fraser	Gough Whitlam
Party	Coalition	Labor
Seats before	28	17
Seats won	26	17
Seat change	▼2	Steady
Popular vote	1,338,308	1,201,560
Percentage	47.2%	42.4%
Swing	▼4.3pp	▼3.1pp
TPP	52.4%	47.6%
TPP swing	▼0.8pp	▲0.8pp

=== Banks ===
This section is an excerpt from Electoral results for the Division of Banks § 1977

1977 Australian federal election: Banks
Party	Candidate	Votes	%	±%
Labor	Vince Martin	33,452	48.6	−4.8
Liberal	Paul Hinton	25,942	37.7	−4.5
Democrats	Montague Greene	9,453	13.7	+13.7
Total formal votes		58,847	97.6	−0.3
Informal votes		1,693	2.4	+0.3
Turnout		60,540	96.4	−0.3
Two-party-preferred result
Labor	Vince Martin	37,330	54.2	−0.6
Liberal	Paul Hinton	31,517	45.8	+0.6
Labor hold		Swing	−0.6	

=== Barton ===
This section is an excerpt from Electoral results for the Division of Barton § 1977

1977 Australian federal election: Barton
Party	Candidate	Votes	%	±%
Liberal	Jim Bradfield	32,128	48.4	−4.1
Labor	Ron Cunningham	27,204	41.0	−4.1
Democrats	Phil White	5,650	8.5	+8.5
Independent	Charles Bellchambers	1,404	2.1	+2.1
Total formal votes		66,386	98.0	
Informal votes		1,322	2.0	
Turnout		67,708	95.7	
Two-party-preferred result
Liberal	Jim Bradfield	36,842	54.0	+0.1
Labor	Ron Cunningham	30,544	46.0	−0.1
Liberal hold		Swing	+0.1	

=== Bennelong ===
This section is an excerpt from Electoral results for the Division of Bennelong § 1977

1977 Australian federal election: Bennelong
Party	Candidate	Votes	%	±%
Liberal	John Howard	37,080	56.2	−1.1
Labor	Noel Welsman	19,794	30.0	−8.6
Democrats	Bruce Irwin	8,544	13.0	+13.0
Progress	David Rennie	556	0.8	+0.8
Total formal votes		65,974	98.2	
Informal votes		1,215	1.8	
Turnout		67,189	95.7	
Two-party-preferred result
Liberal	John Howard		63.4	+3.8
Labor	Noel Welsman		36.6	−3.8
Liberal hold		Swing	+3.8	

=== Berowra ===
This section is an excerpt from Electoral results for the Division of Berowra § 1977

1977 Australian federal election: Berowra
Party	Candidate	Votes	%	±%
Liberal	Harry Edwards	39,350	62.9	−4.7
Labor	Michael Jones	15,325	24.5	−4.3
Democrats	Johannes van Aggele	7,207	11.5	+11.5
Progress	George Simpson	686	1.1	−2.5
Total formal votes		62,568	98.3	
Informal votes		1,069	1.7	
Turnout		63,637	96.2	
Two-party-preferred result
Liberal	Harry Edwards		69.6	−0.9
Labor	Michael Jones		30.4	+0.9
Liberal hold		Swing	−0.9	

=== Blaxland ===
This section is an excerpt from Electoral results for the Division of Blaxland § 1977

1977 Australian federal election: Blaxland
Party	Candidate	Votes	%	±%
Labor	Paul Keating	36,109	54.2	−3.1
Liberal	Salvatore Napoli	21,978	33.0	−7.3
Democrats	Steven Suli	4,500	6.8	+6.8
Independent	William Haggerty	3,974	6.0	+6.0
Total formal votes		66,561	96.3	
Informal votes		2,541	3.7	
Turnout		69,102	95.1	
Two-party-preferred result
Labor	Paul Keating		61.6	+3.8
Liberal	Salvatore Napoli		38.4	−3.8
Labor hold		Swing	+3.8	

=== Bradfield ===
This section is an excerpt from Electoral results for the Division of Bradfield § 1977

1977 Australian federal election: Bradfield
Party	Candidate	Votes	%	±%
Liberal	David Connolly	49,052	72.6	−5.8
Labor	Pauline Kibble	9,578	14.2	−3.5
Democrats	Donald Marrable	7,378	10.9	+10.9
Progress	Christopher Brown	1,518	2.2	−1.7
Total formal votes		67,526	98.7	
Informal votes		913	1.3	
Turnout		68,439	95.2	
Two-party-preferred result
Liberal	David Connolly		79.7	−1.0
Labor	Pauline Kibble		30.3	+1.0
Liberal hold		Swing	−1.0	

=== Calare ===
This section is an excerpt from Electoral results for the Division of Calare § 1977

1977 Australian federal election: Calare
Party	Candidate	Votes	%	±%
Labor	David Simmons	26,799	40.5	−0.9
National Country	Sandy Mackenzie	20,893	31.6	−1.4
Liberal	James Ashton	13,509	20.4	−5.2
Democrats	Darvell Baird	4,986	7.5	+7.5
Total formal votes		66,187	98.4	
Informal votes		1,081	1.6	
Turnout		67,268	96.4	
Two-party-preferred result
National Country	Sandy Mackenzie	36,529	55.2	+0.5
Labor	David Simmons	29,658	44.8	−0.5
National Country hold		Swing	+0.5	

=== Chifley ===
This section is an excerpt from Electoral results for the Division of Chifley § 1977

1977 Australian federal election: Chifley
Party	Candidate	Votes	%	±%
Labor	John Armitage	39,168	60.0	−3.5
Liberal	Richard Taylor	17,745	27.2	−9.3
Democrats	Alfred Tozer	6,414	9.8	+9.8
Communist	Jack Mundey	1,910	2.9	+2.9
Total formal votes		65,237	96.6	
Informal votes		2,307	3.4	
Turnout		67,544	95.9	
Two-party-preferred result
Labor	John Armitage		67.5	+4.0
Liberal	Richard Taylor		38.5	−4.0
Labor hold		Swing	+4.0	

=== Cook ===
This section is an excerpt from Electoral results for the Division of Cook § 1977

1977 Australian federal election: Cook
Party	Candidate	Votes	%	±%
Liberal	Don Dobie	35,648	51.6	−4.4
Labor	Ray Thorburn	25,511	36.9	−3.6
Democrats	Walter Day	7,162	10.4	+10.4
Progress	Henry Soper	791	1.1	−0.4
Total formal votes		69,112	98.5	
Informal votes		1,024	1.5	
Turnout		70,136	96.6	
Two-party-preferred result
Liberal	Don Dobie		58.3	+0.5
Labor	Ray Thorburn		41.7	−0.5
Liberal hold		Swing	+0.5	

=== Cowper ===
This section is an excerpt from Electoral results for the Division of Cowper § 1977

1977 Australian federal election: Cowper
Party	Candidate	Votes	%	±%
National Country	Ian Robinson	41,015	63.9	+2.5
Labor	Colin Clague	23,221	36.1	+1.5
Total formal votes		64,236	98.1	
Informal votes		1,231	1.9	
Turnout		65,467	95.9	
National Country hold		Swing	+0.5	

=== Cunningham ===
This section is an excerpt from Electoral results for the Division of Cunningham § 1977

1977 Australian federal election: Cunningham
Party	Candidate	Votes	%	±%
Labor	Stewart West	36,559	53.5	−8.2
Liberal	Thomas Griffin	21,419	31.3	−5.1
Democrats	Ross Sampson	7,388	10.8	+10.8
Independent	Noel Dennett	1,583	2.3	+2.3
Communist	Mervyn Nixon	1,073	1.6	+1.6
Independent	Rudolph Dezelin	375	0.5	+0.5
Total formal votes		68,397	97.2	
Informal votes		1,957	2.8	
Turnout		70,354	95.5	
Two-party-preferred result
Labor	Stewart West		60.7	−1.6
Liberal	Thomas Griffin		39.3	+1.6
Labor hold		Swing	−1.6	

=== Dundas ===
This section is an excerpt from Electoral results for the Division of Dundas § 1977

1977 Australian federal election: Dundas
Party	Candidate	Votes	%	±%
Liberal	Philip Ruddock	36,427	53.8	−4.4
Labor	Russell Rollason	22,980	33.9	−4.9
Democrats	Brendan Mohide	6,484	9.6	+9.6
Progress	Malcolm McKinnon	1,824	2.7	+2.7
Total formal votes		67,715	98.0	
Informal votes		1,395	2.0	
Turnout		69,110	95.5	
Two-party-preferred result
Liberal	Philip Ruddock		60.1	+0.1
Labor	Russell Rollason		39.9	−0.1
Liberal notional hold		Swing	+0.1	

=== Eden-Monaro ===
This section is an excerpt from Electoral results for the Division of Eden-Monaro § 1977

1977 Australian federal election: Eden-Monaro
Party	Candidate	Votes	%	±%
Liberal	Murray Sainsbury	33,517	51.7	+16.4
Labor	Brian Maguire	25,243	38.9	−4.6
Democrats	Norma Helmers	5,587	8.6	+8.6
Independent	Michael Le Grand	530	0.8	+0.8
Total formal votes		64,877	98.4	
Informal votes		1,041	1.6	
Turnout		65,918	96.6	
Two-party-preferred result
Liberal	Murray Sainsbury		55.9	+0.4
Labor	Brian Maguire		44.1	−0.4
Liberal hold		Swing	+0.4	

=== Farrer ===
This section is an excerpt from Electoral results for the Division of Farrer § 1977

1977 Australian federal election: Farrer
Party	Candidate	Votes	%	±%
Liberal	Wal Fife	40,187	61.9	+11.5
Labor	Donald Fleming	19,400	29.9	+0.2
Democrats	Margaret Healey	3,962	6.1	+6.1
Independent	Thomas Guy	718	1.1	+1.1
Progress	Maureen Nathan	643	1.0	+0.1
Total formal votes		64,910	98.1	
Informal votes		1,230	1.9	
Turnout		66,140	94.9	
Two-party-preferred result
Liberal	Wal Fife		66.4	−0.7
Labor	Donald Fleming		33.6	+0.7
Liberal hold		Swing	−0.7	

=== Grayndler ===
This section is an excerpt from Electoral results for the Division of Grayndler § 1977

1977 Australian federal election: Grayndler
Party	Candidate	Votes	%	±%
Labor	Frank Stewart	36,299	57.7	+6.0
Liberal	Bill Vasseleou	20,980	33.4	−6.6
Democrats	Christine Townend	4,558	7.2	+7.2
Socialist	Frank Vouros	1,048	1.7	+1.7
Total formal votes		62,885	96.7	
Informal votes		2,145	3.3	
Turnout		65,030	92.0	
Two-party-preferred result
Labor	Frank Stewart		62.2	+6.8
Liberal	Bill Vasseleou		37.8	−6.8
Labor hold		Swing	+6.8	

=== Gwydir ===
This section is an excerpt from Electoral results for the Division of Gwydir § 1977

1977 Australian federal election: Gwydir
Party	Candidate	Votes	%	±%
National Country	Ralph Hunt	37,600	59.0	+0.2
Labor	Francis Fish	20,831	32.7	−7.0
Democrats	Heather Howe	2,866	4.5	+4.5
Progress	Brian Allen	1,743	2.7	+2.7
Independent	Lyall Munro	654	1.0	+1.0
Total formal votes		63,694	97.9	
Informal votes		1,362	2.1	
Turnout		65,056	95.8	
Two-party-preferred result
National Country	Ralph Hunt		63.3	+3.0
Labor	Francis Fish		36.7	−3.0
National Country hold		Swing	+3.0	

=== Hughes ===
This section is an excerpt from Electoral results for the Division of Hughes § 1977

1977 Australian federal election: Hughes
Party	Candidate	Votes	%	±%
Labor	Les Johnson	34,659	51.7	−4.9
Liberal	Henry Halliwell	22,229	33.1	−10.3
Democrats	Kenneth Johnson	10,212	15.2	−4.9
Total formal votes		67,100	97.9	
Informal votes		1,410	2.1	
Turnout		68,510	95.5	
Two-party-preferred result
Labor	Les Johnson		59.3	+2.7
Liberal	Henry Halliwell		40.7	−2.7
Labor hold		Swing	+2.7	

=== Hume ===
This section is an excerpt from Electoral results for the Division of Hume § 1977

1977 Australian federal election: Hume
Party	Candidate	Votes	%	±%
National Country	Stephen Lusher	37,521	57.0	+3.2
Labor	George Brenner	25,266	38.4	−1.4
Democrats	Mark Richard	2,986	4.5	+4.5
Total formal votes		65,773	98.8	
Informal votes		815	1.2	
Turnout		66,588	96.1	
Two-party-preferred result
National Country	Stephen Lusher		59.3	−0.9
Labor	George Brenner		40.7	+0.9
National Country hold		Swing	−0.9	

=== Hunter ===
This section is an excerpt from Electoral results for the Division of Hunter § 1977

1977 Australian federal election: Hunter
Party	Candidate	Votes	%	±%
Labor	Bert James	42,076	60.7	−5.8
Liberal	Oliver Fennell	19,299	27.8	−5.7
Democrats	Elisabeth Kirkby	7,944	11.5	+11.5
Total formal votes		69,319	98.0	
Informal votes		1,383	2.0	
Turnout		70,702	96.3	
Two-party-preferred result
Labor	Bert James		66.5	+0.0
Liberal	Oliver Fennell		32.5	+0.0
Labor hold		Swing	+0.0	

=== Kingsford Smith ===
This section is an excerpt from Electoral results for the Division of Kingsford Smith § 1977

1977 Australian federal election: Kingsford-Smith
Party	Candidate	Votes	%	±%
Labor	Lionel Bowen	42,222	64.4	+0.8
Liberal	Collin O'Neill	19,377	29.6	−4.3
Democrats	Edward Ward	3,974	6.1	+6.1
Total formal votes		65,573	96.7	
Informal votes		2,213	3.3	
Turnout		67,786	94.2	
Two-party-preferred result
Labor	Lionel Bowen		67.5	+2.6
Liberal	Collin O'Neill		32.5	−2.6
Labor hold		Swing	+2.6	

=== Lowe ===
This section is an excerpt from Electoral results for the Division of Lowe § 1977

1977 Australian federal election: Lowe
Party	Candidate	Votes	%	±%
Liberal	Sir William McMahon	35,044	52.8	−3.4
Labor	Dick Hall	35,044	39.2	−0.7
Democrats	Frederick Tross	3,764	5.7	+5.7
Independent	Charles Bingle	1,553	2.3	+2.3
Total formal votes		66,413	97.3	
Informal votes		1,840	2.7	
Turnout		68,253	93.5	
Two-party-preferred result
Liberal	Sir William McMahon		56.3	−1.6
Labor	Dick Hall		43.7	+1.6
Liberal hold		Swing	−1.6	

=== Lyne ===
This section is an excerpt from Electoral results for the Division of Lyne § 1977

1977 Australian federal election: Lyne
Party	Candidate	Votes	%	±%
National Country	Philip Lucock	36,678	55.8	−3.3
Labor	Noel Unicomb	22,308	34.0	+2.1
Democrats	Allen Edwards	6,687	10.2	+10.2
Total formal votes		65,673	98.6	
Informal votes		916	1.4	
Turnout		66,589	97.1	
Two-party-preferred result
National Country	Philip Lucock		61.4	−2.2
Labor	Noel Unicomb		38.6	+2.2
National Country hold		Swing	−2.2	

=== Macarthur ===
This section is an excerpt from Electoral results for the Division of Macarthur § 1977

1977 Australian federal election: Macarthur
Party	Candidate	Votes	%	±%
Liberal	Michael Baume	32,209	48.4	−2.9
Labor	John Kerin	29,686	44.6	−0.4
Democrats	William Speirs	4,034	6.1	+6.1
Progress	Victor Thomas	603	0.9	−1.8
Total formal votes		66,532	98.5	
Informal votes		1,012	1.5	
Turnout		67,544	96.3	
Two-party-preferred result
Liberal	Michael Baume	34,557	51.9	−2.2
Labor	John Kerin	31,975	48.1	+2.2
Liberal hold		Swing	−2.2	

=== Mackellar ===
This section is an excerpt from Electoral results for the Division of Mackellar § 1977

1977 Australian federal election: Mackellar
Party	Candidate	Votes	%	±%
Liberal	Jim Carlton	36,064	55.4	−7.4
Labor	John Barclay	18,329	28.2	−1.9
Democrats	Robert Williams	7,262	11.2	+11.2
Independent	Ronald Davis	1,604	2.5	+2.5
Progress	John Booth	1,000	1.5	−3.5
Independent	Barry Geyle	621	1.0	+1.0
Independent	Thomas Mellor	185	0.3	+0.3
Total formal votes		65,065	97.5	
Informal votes		1,682	2.5	
Turnout		66.747	93.1	
Two-party-preferred result
Liberal	Jim Carlton		64.3	−2.7
Labor	John Barclay		35.7	+2.7
Liberal hold		Swing	−2.7	

=== Macquarie ===
This section is an excerpt from Electoral results for the Division of Macquarie § 1977

1977 Australian federal election: Macquarie
Party	Candidate	Votes	%	±%
Liberal	Reg Gillard	28,299	41.8	−11.1
Labor	Ross Free	26,651	39.4	−4.6
Democrats	Peter Monaghan	7,328	10.8	+10.8
Independent	Michael Barratt	4,849	7.2	+7.2
Progress	Alyn Foster	513	0.8	−1.1
Total formal votes		67,640	97.7	
Informal votes		1,622	2.3	
Turnout		69,262	94.6	
Two-party-preferred result
Liberal	Reg Gillard	34,966	51.7	−2.6
Labor	Ross Free	32,674	48.3	+2.6
Liberal hold		Swing	−2.6	

=== Mitchell ===
This section is an excerpt from Electoral results for the Division of Mitchell § 1977

1977 Australian federal election: Mitchell
Party	Candidate	Votes	%	±%
Liberal	Alan Cadman	39,454	60.4	−5.8
Labor	Ellen Thompson	17,733	27.1	−4.0
Democrats	Michael Hartnell	5,988	9.2	+9.2
Independent	Ronald Allan	1,817	2.8	+2.8
Progress	Dimitar Mikusalev	353	0.5	−0.7
Total formal votes		65,345	98.0	
Informal votes		1,331	2.0	
Turnout		66,676	95.5	
Two-party-preferred result
Liberal	Alan Cadman		67.2	−1.0
Labor	Ellen Thompson		32.8	+1.0
Liberal hold		Swing	−1.0	

=== New England ===
This section is an excerpt from Electoral results for the Division of New England § 1977

1977 Australian federal election: New England
Party	Candidate	Votes	%	±%
National Country	Ian Sinclair	37,601	59.3	−4.1
Labor	Selby Dean	19,941	31.4	−1.2
Democrats	Bradley Mulligan	5,919	9.3	+9.3
Total formal votes		63,461	98.5	
Informal votes		979	1.5	
Turnout		64,440	95.4	
Two-party-preferred result
National Country	Ian Sinclair		64.0	−0.9
Labor	Selby Dean		36.0	+0.9
National Country hold		Swing	−0.9	

=== Newcastle ===
This section is an excerpt from Electoral results for the Division of Newcastle1977

1977 Australian federal election: Newcastle
Party	Candidate	Votes	%	±%
Labor	Charles Jones	38,620	57.3	−2.8
Liberal	Elaine Samuels	22,485	33.4	−4.7
Democrats	Ian Hay	3,546	5.3	+5.3
Communist	Darrell Dawson	2,763	4.1	+2.2
Total formal votes		67,414	97.7	
Informal votes		1,606	2.3	
Turnout		69,020	96.6	
Two-party-preferred result
Labor	Charles Jones		63.7	+1.9
Liberal	Elaine Samuels		36.3	−1.9
Labor hold		Swing	+1.9	

=== North Sydney ===
This section is an excerpt from Electoral results for the Division of North Sydney § 1977

1977 Australian federal election: North Sydney
Party	Candidate	Votes	%	±%
Liberal	Bill Graham	38,176	58.6	−5.2
Labor	Maurice May	17,111	26.2	−6.5
Democrats	John Pierce	7,153	11.0	+11.0
Progress	Peter Corrie	1,672	2.6	−0.2
Independent	John Maher	1,073	1.6	+1.6
Total formal votes		65,185	97.7	
Informal votes		1,503	2.3	
Turnout		66,688	92.7	
Two-party-preferred result
Liberal	Bill Graham		67.3	+0.9
Labor	Maurice May		32.7	−0.9
Liberal hold		Swing	+0.9	

=== Parramatta ===
This section is an excerpt from Electoral results for the Division of Parramatta § 1977

1977 Australian federal election: Parramatta
Party	Candidate	Votes	%	±%
Labor	John Brown	34,405	52.0	−0.1
Liberal	Douglas Cox	26,315	39.8	−5.2
Democrats	Peter Lukunic	5,397	8.2	+8.2
Total formal votes		66,117	97.0	
Informal votes		2,062	3.0	
Turnout		68,179	95.3	
Two-party-preferred result
Labor	John Brown		56.1	+3.6
Liberal	Douglas Cox		43.9	−3.6
Labor notional hold		Swing	+3.6	

=== Paterson ===
This section is an excerpt from Electoral results for the Division of Paterson § 1977

1977 Australian federal election: Paterson
Party	Candidate	Votes	%	±%
National Country	Frank O'Keefe	36,740	57.6	+0.9
Labor	Kerry Scott	21,862	34.3	−6.6
Democrats	Paul Baker	4,250	6.7	+6.7
Independent	William O'Donnell	923	1.4	+1.4
Total formal votes		63,775	98.2	
Informal votes		1,188	1.8	
Turnout		64,963	95.7	
Two-party-preferred result
National Country	Frank O'Keefe		62.2	+3.8
Labor	Kerry Scott		37.8	−3.8
National Country hold		Swing	+3.8	

=== Phillip ===
This section is an excerpt from Electoral results for the Division of Phillip § 1977

1977 Australian federal election: Phillip
Party	Candidate	Votes	%	±%
Liberal	Jack Birney	31,517	48.0	−1.2
Labor	Joe Riordan	28,876	44.0	−4.3
Democrats	Alan Needham	4,664	7.1	+7.1
Independent	Barry Elliott	581	0.9	+0.9
Total formal votes		65,638	97.8	
Informal votes		1,508	2.2	
Turnout		67,146	91.1	
Two-party-preferred result
Liberal	Jack Birney	34,127	52.0	+0.8
Labor	Joe Riordan	31,511	48.0	−0.8
Liberal hold		Swing	+0.8	

=== Prospect ===
This section is an excerpt from Electoral results for the Division of Prospect § 1977

1977 Australian federal election: Prospect
Party	Candidate	Votes	%	±%
Labor	Dick Klugman	34,933	54.6	−5.4
Liberal	Alan Byers	21,591	33.8	−4.3
Democrats	Laurence Bourke	7,421	11.6	+11.6
Total formal votes		63,945	95.9	
Informal votes		2,731	4.1	
Turnout		66,676	94.1	
Two-party-preferred result
Labor	Dick Klugman		59.9	−1.2
Liberal	Alan Byers		40.1	+1.2
Labor hold		Swing	−1.2	

=== Reid ===
This section is an excerpt from Electoral results for the Division of Reid § 1977

1977 Australian federal election: Reid
Party	Candidate	Votes	%	±%
Labor	Tom Uren	38,667	58.5	−3.3
Liberal	Terence Shanahan	21,246	32.1	−1.2
Democrats	Frederick Bluck	6,216	9.4	+9.4
Total formal votes		66,129	96.7	
Informal votes		2,224	3.3	
Turnout		68,353	95.2	
Two-party-preferred result
Labor	Tom Uren		62.7	+0.1
Liberal	Terence Shanahan		37.3	−0.1
Labor hold		Swing	+0.1	

=== Richmond ===
This section is an excerpt from Electoral results for the Division of Richmond § 1977

1977 Australian federal election: Richmond
Party	Candidate	Votes	%	±%
National Country	Doug Anthony	40,869	61.4	+0.1
Labor	Josephine Maxwell	21,170	31.8	−2.8
Democrats	Bernard Walrut	3,611	5.4	+5.4
Independent	John Mallett	941	1.4	+1.4
Total formal votes		66,591	98.9	
Informal votes		754	1.1	
Turnout		67,345	95.8	
Two-party-preferred result
National Country	Doug Anthony		64.8	+1.2
Labor	Josephine Maxwell		35.2	−1.2
National Country hold		Swing	+1.2	

=== Riverina ===
This section is an excerpt from Electoral results for the Division of Riverina § 1977

1977 Australian federal election: Riverina
Party	Candidate	Votes	%	±%
Labor	John FitzPatrick	31,237	48.8	−3.6
National Country	John Sullivan	31,134	48.7	+1.1
Independent	Rodney Lawrence	1,580	2.5	+2.5
Total formal votes		74,962	98.2	
Informal votes		1,159	1.8	
Turnout		65,110	94.4	
Two-party-preferred result
Labor	John FitzPatrick	32,049	50.1	−2.3
National Country	John Sullivan	31,902	49.9	+2.3
Labor notional hold		Swing	−2.3	

=== Robertson ===
This section is an excerpt from Electoral results for the Division of Robertson § 1977

1977 Australian federal election: Robertson
Party	Candidate	Votes	%	±%
Labor	Barry Cohen	32,341	46.7	−1.5
Liberal	Malcolm Brooks	29,825	43.1	−6.2
Democrats	Trevor Willsher	7,095	10.2	+10.2
Total formal votes		69,261	98.5	
Informal votes		1,085	1.5	
Turnout		70,346	96.1	
Two-party-preferred result
Labor	Barry Cohen	36,229	52.3	+3.0
Liberal	Malcolm Brooks	33,032	47.7	−3.0
Labor notional gain from Liberal		Swing	+3.0	

=== Shortland ===
This section is an excerpt from Electoral results for the Division of Shortland § 1977

1977 Australian federal election: Shortland
Party	Candidate	Votes	%	±%
Labor	Peter Morris	37,406	54.5	−4.5
Liberal	Richard Bevan	24,178	35.2	−3.0
Democrats	Lionel Lambkin	7,058	10.3	+10.3
Total formal votes		68,642	98.0	
Informal votes		1,415	2.0	
Turnout		70,057	96.0	
Two-party-preferred result
Labor	Peter Morris		59.7	−0.7
Liberal	Richard Bevan		40.3	+0.7
Labor hold		Swing	−0.7	

=== St George ===
This section is an excerpt from Electoral results for the Division of St George § 1977

1977 Australian federal election: St George
Party	Candidate	Votes	%	±%
Liberal	Maurice Neil	32,078	47.9	−1.1
Labor	Tony Whitlam	30,227	45.1	−3.6
Democrats	Ronald Kirkwood	4,243	6.3	+6.3
Progress	David Kriss	441	0.7	−1.6
Total formal votes		66,989	97.4	
Informal votes		1,784	2.6	
Turnout		68,773	95.4	
Two-party-preferred result
Liberal	Maurice Neil	34,827	52.0	+2.0
Labor	Tony Whitlam	32,162	48.0	−2.0
Liberal hold		Swing	+2.0	

=== Sydney ===
This section is an excerpt from Electoral results for the Division of Sydney § 1977

1977 Australian federal election: Sydney
Party	Candidate	Votes	%	±%
Labor	Les McMahon	39,307	63.2	−0.9
Liberal	Andrew Morrison	14,158	22.7	−5.1
Communist	Aileen Beaver	3,935	6.3	+0.7
Democrats	Judith Roberts	3,428	5.5	+5.5
Socialist	Harry Black	847	1.4	+1.4
Independent	Naomi Mayers	560	0.9	+0.9
Total formal votes		62,235	95.7	
Informal votes		2,773	4.3	
Turnout		65,008	90.5	
Two-party-preferred result
Labor	Les McMahon		73.4	+3.3
Liberal	Andrew Morrison		26.6	−3.3
Labor hold		Swing	+3.3	

=== Warringah ===
This section is an excerpt from Electoral results for the Division of Warringah § 1977

1977 Australian federal election: Warringah
Party	Candidate	Votes	%	±%
Liberal	Michael MacKellar	40,984	62.9	−4.4
Labor	Christopher Osborne	16,102	24.7	−6.8
Democrats	Anita Stiller	6,385	9.8	+9.8
Progress	Stephen Keliher	1,677	2.6	+2.6
Total formal votes		65,148	98.0	
Informal votes		1,326	2.0	
Turnout		66,474	94.6	
Two-party-preferred result
Liberal	Michael MacKellar		70.2	+2.2
Labor	Christopher Osborne		29.8	−2.2
Liberal hold		Swing	+2.2	

=== Wentworth ===
This section is an excerpt from Electoral results for the Division of Wentworth § 1977

1977 Australian federal election: Wentworth
Party	Candidate	Votes	%	±%
Liberal	Bob Ellicott	35,980	57.5	−0.4
Labor	Michael Winters	19,638	31.4	−5.3
Democrats	Joan Kersey	5,069	8.1	+8.1
Progress	John Curvers	1,909	3.0	−0.9
Total formal votes		62,596	97.5	
Informal votes		1,608	2.5	
Turnout		64,204	90.1	
Two-party-preferred result
Liberal	Bob Ellicott		64.4	+2.6
Labor	Michael Winters		35.6	−2.6
Liberal hold		Swing	+2.6	

=== Werriwa ===
This section is an excerpt from Electoral results for the Division of Werriwa § 1977

1977 Australian federal election: Werriwa
Party	Candidate	Votes	%	±%
Labor	Gough Whitlam	37,262	55.5	−0.7
Liberal	Jonas Abromas	22,787	33.9	−6.4
Democrats	Keith Olson	6,035	9.0	+9.0
Independent	Ross May	1,079	1.6	+1.6
Total formal votes		67,163	96.7	
Informal votes		2,205	3.2	
Turnout		69,368	95.5	
Two-party-preferred result
Labor	Gough Whitlam		60.2	+2.0
Liberal	Jonas Abromas		39.8	−2.0
Labor hold		Swing	+2.0	

== Victoria ==
1977 Australian federal election (Victoria)
← 1975	10 December 1977	1980 →

All 33 Victorian seats in the House of Representatives 17 seats needed for a majority
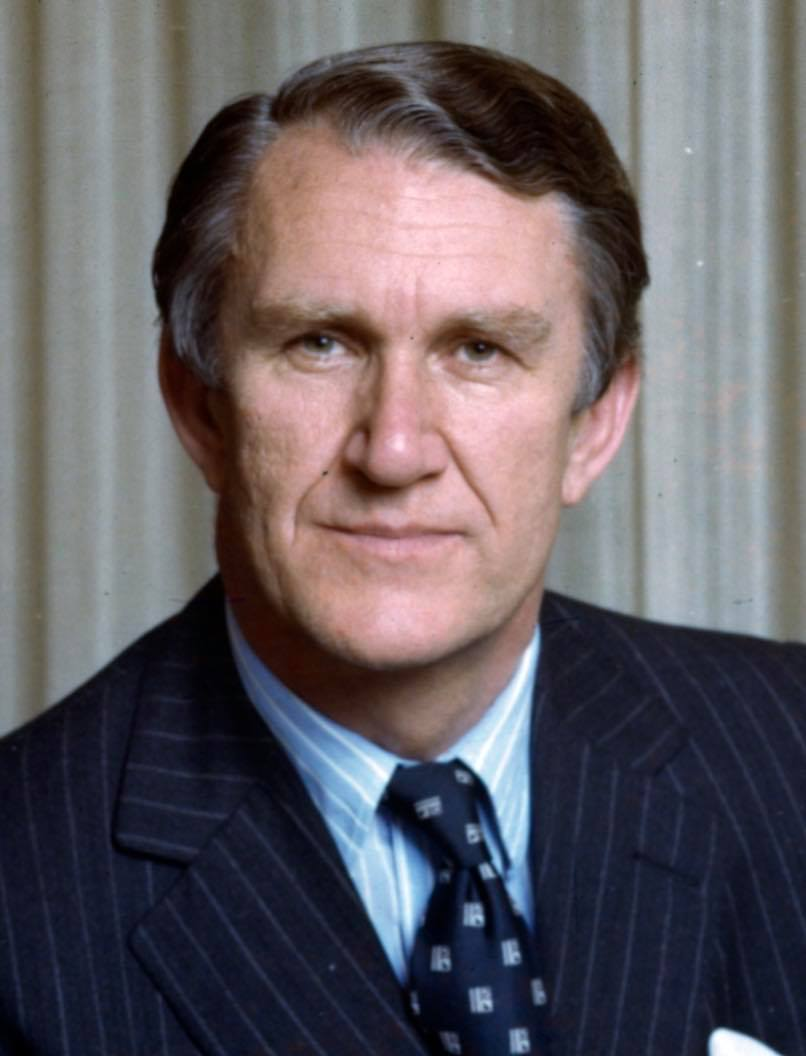

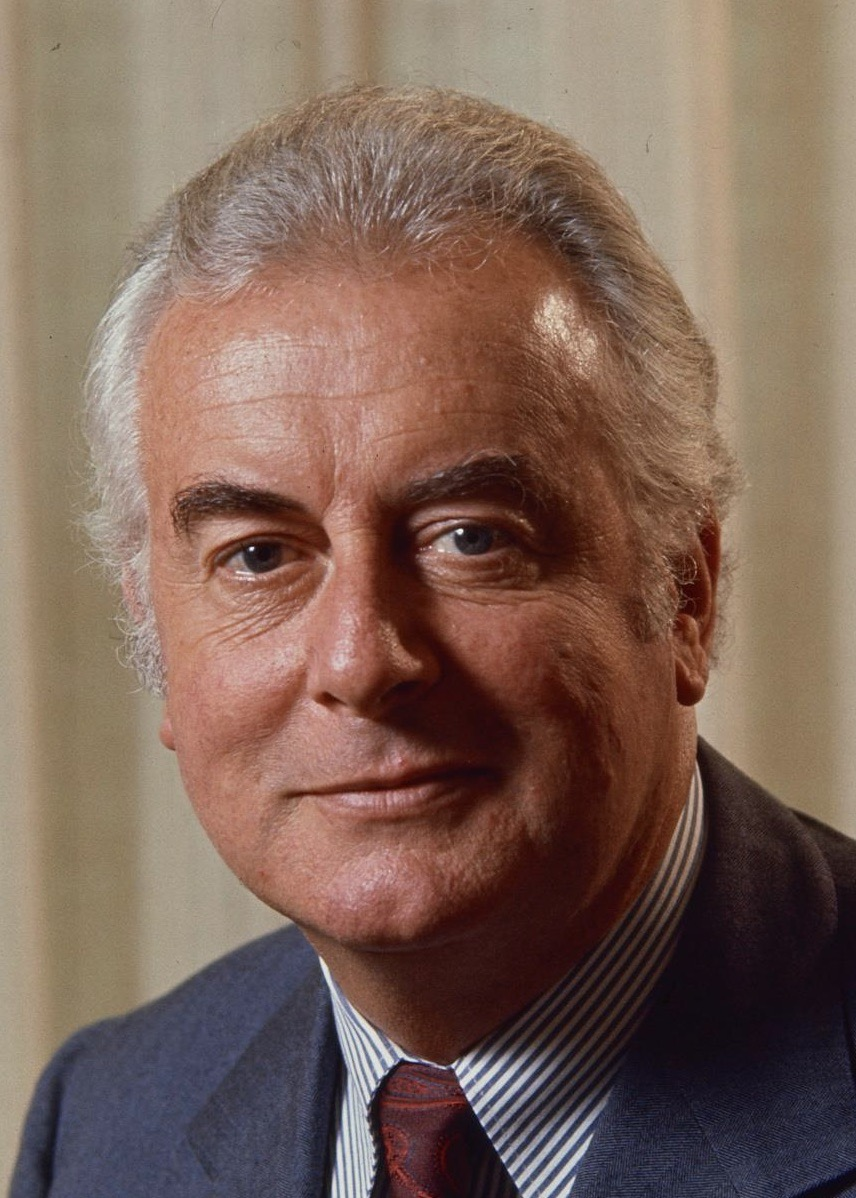
	First party	Second party
Leader	Malcolm Fraser	Gough Whitlam
Party	Coalition	Labor
Seats before	24	10
Seats won	23	10
Seat change	▼1	Steady
Popular vote	962,577	791,083
Percentage	45.2%	37.2%
Swing	▼6.0pp	▼4.9pp
TPP	55.5%	44.5%
TPP swing	▼0.7pp	▲0.7pp

=== Balaclava ===
This section is an excerpt from Electoral results for the Division of Balaclava § 1977

1977 Australian federal election: Balaclava
Party	Candidate	Votes	%	±%
Liberal	Ian Macphee	33,304	50.6	−7.0
Labor	Robert Steele	19,065	29.0	−5.1
Democrats	Zelma Furey	10,129	15.4	+15.4
Democratic Labor	Peter Lawlor	3,321	5.0	+1.0
Total formal votes		65,819	97.4	
Informal votes		1,774	2.6	
Turnout		67,593	94.6	
Two-party-preferred result
Liberal	Ian Macphee		63.3	+0.8
Labor	Robert Steele		36.7	−0.8
Liberal hold		Swing	+0.8	

=== Ballaarat ===
This section is an excerpt from Electoral results for the Division of Ballarat § 1977

1977 Australian federal election: Ballarat
Party	Candidate	Votes	%	±%
Liberal	Jim Short	30,480	48.0	−1.5
Labor	Norman Baker	23,487	37.0	−3.5
Democrats	Graham Gough	6,298	9.9	+9.9
Democratic Labor	William Griffin	3,202	5.0	−2.2
Total formal votes		63,467	98.0	
Informal votes		1,318	2.0	
Turnout		64,785	96.9	
Two-party-preferred result
Liberal	Jim Short		57.5	+0.0
Labor	Norman Baker		42.5	−0.0
Liberal hold		Swing	+0.0	

=== Batman ===
This section is an excerpt from Electoral results for the Division of Batman § 1977

1977 Australian federal election: Batman
Party	Candidate	Votes	%	±%
Labor	Brian Howe	31,538	47.3	−4.6
Liberal	Gillford Brown	24,932	37.4	−3.3
Democrats	Mario Piraino	6,644	10.0	+10.0
Democratic Labor	Phillip Lorenz	3,559	5.3	−2.1
Total formal votes		66,673	96.5	
Informal votes		2,392	3.5	
Turnout		69,065	95.7	
Two-party-preferred result
Labor	Brian Howe	35,581	53.4	+0.9
Liberal	Gillford Brown	31,092	46.6	−0.9
Labor hold		Swing	+0.9	

=== Bendigo ===
This section is an excerpt from Electoral results for the Division of Bendigo § 1977

1977 Australian federal election: Bendigo
Party	Candidate	Votes	%	±%
Liberal	John Bourchier	30,072	48.0	−1.3
Labor	Dennis Muldoon	21,620	34.5	−7.0
Democrats	Ian Price	7,905	12.6	+12.6
Democratic Labor	Paul Brennan	3,005	4.8	+0.3
Total formal votes		62,602	98.1	
Informal votes		1,210	1.9	
Turnout		63,812	95.8	
Two-party-preferred result
Liberal	John Bourchier		58.5	+0.8
Labor	Dennis Muldoon		41.5	−0.8
Liberal hold		Swing	+0.8	

=== Bruce ===
This section is an excerpt from Electoral results for the Division of Bruce § 1977

1977 Australian federal election: Bruce
Party	Candidate	Votes	%	±%
Liberal	Billy Snedden	33,913	50.4	−7.3
Labor	Timothy Burke	20,927	31.1	−5.3
Democrats	John Sutcliffe	10,199	15.2	+15.2
Democratic Labor	John Mulholland	2,237	3.3	+0.3
Total formal votes		67,276	97.9	
Informal votes		1,418	2.1	
Turnout		68,694	96.9	
Two-party-preferred result
Liberal	Billy Snedden		61.0	−0.6
Labor	Timothy Burke		39.0	+0.6
Liberal hold		Swing	−0.6	

=== Burke ===
This section is an excerpt from Electoral results for the Division of Burke (1969–2004) § 1977

1977 Australian federal election: Burke
Party	Candidate	Votes	%	±%
Labor	Keith Johnson	32,248	50.4	−0.7
Liberal	Mihaly Lengyel	20,680	32.3	−7.8
Democrats	Eric Spencer	7,122	11.1	+11.1
Democratic Labor	Colin Walsh	3,963	6.2	+0.9
Total formal votes		64,013	96.5	
Informal votes		2,341	3.5	
Turnout		66,354	95.8	
Two-party-preferred result
Labor	Keith Johnson		56.6	+2.7
Liberal	Mihaly Lengyel		43.4	−2.7
Labor hold		Swing	+2.7	

=== Casey ===
This section is an excerpt from Electoral results for the Division of Casey § 1977

1977 Australian federal election: Casey
Party	Candidate	Votes	%	±%
Liberal	Peter Falconer	29,896	48.3	−5.9
Labor	Peter Watson	18,772	30.3	−9.4
Democrats	Malcolm Whittle	10,314	16.7	+16.7
Democratic Labor	Francis Feltham	1,761	2.8	−0.3
Independent	Martin Hetherich	694	1.1	+1.1
Independent	Stanley Hillman	343	0.6	+0.6
Independent	Henry Leggett	151	0.2	+0.2
Total formal votes		61,931	97.0	
Informal votes		1,917	3.0	
Turnout		63,848	95.8	
Two-party-preferred result
Liberal	Peter Falconer		60.2	+1.5
Labor	Peter Watson		39.8	−1.5
Liberal hold		Swing	+1.5	

=== Chisholm ===
This section is an excerpt from Electoral results for the Division of Chisholm § 1977

1977 Australian federal election: Chisholm
Party	Candidate	Votes	%	±%
Liberal	Tony Staley	31,808	46.5	−8.9
Labor	Helen Mayer	21,548	31.5	−5.8
Democrats	Robert Caulfield	11,739	17.2	+17.2
Democratic Labor	Joe Stanley	3,299	4.8	−0.2
Total formal votes		68,394	97.9	
Informal votes		1,501	2.1	
Turnout		69,895	95.2	
Two-party-preferred result
Liberal	Tony Staley		58.9	−1.9
Labor	Helen Mayer		41.1	+1.9
Liberal hold		Swing	−1.9	

=== Corangamite ===
This section is an excerpt from Electoral results for the Division of Corangamite § 1977

1977 Australian federal election: Corangamite
Party	Candidate	Votes	%	±%
Liberal	Tony Street	37,163	58.5	−5.3
Labor	Shirley Ambrose	16,786	26.4	−4.4
Democrats	Kathleen May	6,275	9.9	+9.9
Democratic Labor	Francis O'Brien	2,756	4.3	+0.3
Independent	Neil McDonald	548	0.9	+0.9
Total formal votes		63,528	98.3	
Informal votes		1,101	1.7	
Turnout		64,629	97.7	
Two-party-preferred result
Liberal	Tony Street		67.8	−0.2
Labor	Shirley Ambrose		32.2	+0.2
Liberal hold		Swing	−0.2	

=== Corio ===
This section is an excerpt from Electoral results for the Division of Corio § 1977

1977 Australian federal election: Corio
Party	Candidate	Votes	%	±%
Labor	Gordon Scholes	31,612	48.4	−0.6
Liberal	Clive Bubb	26,330	40.3	−5.9
Democrats	Guenter Sahr	4,740	7.3	+7.3
Democratic Labor	James Jordan	2,685	4.1	+0.2
Total formal votes		65,367	97.3	
Informal votes		1,794	2.7	
Turnout		67,161	96.2	
Two-party-preferred result
Labor	Gordon Scholes	34,588	52.9	+2.9
Liberal	Clive Bubb	30,779	47.1	−2.9
Labor hold		Swing	+2.9	

=== Deakin ===
This section is an excerpt from Electoral results for the Division of Deakin § 1977

1977 Australian federal election: Deakin
Party	Candidate	Votes	%	±%
Liberal	Alan Jarman	32,378	46.1	−6.3
Labor	Neville Gay	22,730	32.4	−7.6
Democrats	Alan Teed	11,451	16.3	+16.3
Democratic Labor	Daniel Condon	3,670	5.2	+1.0
Total formal votes		70,229	97.6	
Informal votes		1,710	2.4	
Turnout		71,939	96.4	
Two-party-preferred result
Liberal	Alan Jarman	40,316	57.4	−0.4
Labor	Neville Gay	29,913	42.6	+0.4
Liberal hold		Swing	−0.4	

=== Diamond Valley ===
This section is an excerpt from Electoral results for the Division of Diamond Valley § 1977

1977 Australian federal election: Diamond Valley
Party	Candidate	Votes	%	±%
Liberal	Neil Brown	31,674	48.5	−7.7
Labor	Jean Downing	20,355	31.2	−6.9
Democrats	Ronald Goldman	10,561	16.2	+16.2
Democratic Labor	Christopher Curtis	2,672	4.1	+1.0
Total formal votes		65,262	98.2	
Informal votes		1,173	1.8	
Turnout		66,435	96.7	
Two-party-preferred result
Liberal	Neil Brown		60.3	+0.0
Labor	Jean Downing		39.7	-0.0
Liberal hold		Swing	+0.0	

=== Flinders ===
This section is an excerpt from Electoral results for the Division of Flinders § 1977

1977 Australian federal election: Flinders
Party	Candidate	Votes	%	±%
Liberal	Phillip Lynch	32,897	50.5	−9.4
Labor	Geoffrey Eastwood	19,401	29.8	−5.5
Democrats	Harold Fraser	10,070	15.5	+15.5
Democratic Labor	John Cass	2,089	3.2	+1.1
Independent	Monty Hollow	639	1.0	+1.0
Total formal votes		65,096	97.7	
Informal votes		1,553	2.3	
Turnout		66,649	95.7	
Two-party-preferred result
Liberal	Phillip Lynch		60.7	−1.9
Labor	Geoffrey Eastwood		39.3	+1.9
Liberal hold		Swing	−1.9	

=== Gellibrand ===
This section is an excerpt from Electoral results for the Division of Gellibrand § 1977

1977 Australian federal election: Gellibrand
Party	Candidate	Votes	%	±%
Labor	Ralph Willis	38,433	58.3	−3.1
Liberal	Anton Zajc	15,241	23.1	−6.6
Democratic Labor	Bert Bailey	6,606	10.0	+1.0
Democrats	June Smith	5,663	8.6	+8.6
Total formal votes		65,943	95.2	
Informal votes		3,295	4.8	
Turnout		69,238	95.6	
Two-party-preferred result
Labor	Ralph Willis		64.5	+2.3
Liberal	Anton Zajc		35.5	−2.3
Labor hold		Swing	+2.3	

=== Gippsland ===
This section is an excerpt from Electoral results for the Division of Gippsland § 1977

1977 Australian federal election: Gippsland
Party	Candidate	Votes	%	±%
National Country	Peter Nixon	35,778	58.0	−6.7
Labor	William Switzer	14,634	23.7	−4.9
Democrats	Thomas Reid	6,424	10.4	+10.4
Democratic Labor	Robert McMahon	3,003	4.9	−1.9
Independent	Bruce Ingle	1,884	3.1	+3.1
Total formal votes		61,723	97.6	
Informal votes		1,501	2.4	
Turnout		63,224	95.8	
Two-party-preferred result
National Country	Peter Nixon		69.7	−1.2
Labor	William Switzer		30.3	+1.2
National Country hold		Swing	−1.2	

=== Henty ===
This section is an excerpt from Electoral results for the Division of Henty § 1977

1977 Australian federal election: Henty
Party	Candidate	Votes	%	±%
Liberal	Ken Aldred	29,660	45.0	−6.5
Labor	Joan Child	27,325	41.5	−2.3
Democrats	Fred Ingamells	6,509	9.9	+9.9
Democratic Labor	Terry Farrell	2,061	3.1	−0.4
Independent	Tony Dear	359	0.5	+0.5
Total formal votes		65,914	97.1	
Informal votes		1,946	2.9	
Turnout		67,860	95.8	
Two-party-preferred result
Liberal	Ken Aldred	34,736	52.7	−2.5
Labor	Joan Child	31,178	47.3	+2.5
Liberal hold		Swing	−2.5	

=== Higgins ===
This section is an excerpt from Electoral results for the Division of Higgins § 1977

1977 Australian federal election: Higgins
Party	Candidate	Votes	%	±%
Liberal	Roger Shipton	36,504	55.2	−5.5
Labor	Ann Jackson	17,308	26.2	−6.4
Democrats	Jim Thornley	8,292	12.5	+12.5
Democratic Labor	Martin Cahill	3,998	6.0	+1.2
Total formal votes		66,102	97.8	
Informal votes		1,481	2.2	
Turnout		67,583	94.5	
Two-party-preferred result
Liberal	Roger Shipton		66.0	+1.1
Labor	Ann Jackson		34.0	−1.1
Liberal hold		Swing	+1.1	

=== Holt ===
This section is an excerpt from Electoral results for the Division of Holt § 1977

1977 Australian federal election: Holt
Party	Candidate	Votes	%	±%
Liberal	William Yates	27,200	43.0	−7.6
Labor	Michael Duffy	25,411	40.2	−3.9
Democrats	Brian Stockton	8,077	12.8	+12.8
Democratic Labor	Kevin Leydon	2,566	4.1	−1.2
Total formal votes		63,254	97.0	
Informal votes		1,950	3.0	
Turnout		65,204	95.1	
Two-party-preferred result
Liberal	William Yates	32,790	51.8	−2.2
Labor	Michael Duffy	30,464	48.2	+2.2
Liberal hold		Swing	−2.2	

=== Hotham ===
This section is an excerpt from Electoral results for the Division of Hotham § 1977

1977 Australian federal election: Hotham
Party	Candidate	Votes	%	±%
Liberal	Roger Johnston	27,663	40.4	−11.7
Labor	Tony Ross	26,144	38.1	−5.6
Democrats	Kenneth Weaver	12,587	18.4	+18.4
Democratic Labor	Edward Woods	2,153	3.1	−0.2
Total formal votes		68,547	97.0	
Informal votes		2,099	3.0	
Turnout		70,646	95.8	
Two-party-preferred result
Liberal	Roger Johnston	35,450	51.7	−3.8
Labor	Tony Ross	33,097	48.3	+3.8
Liberal hold		Swing	−3.8	

=== Indi ===
This section is an excerpt from Electoral results for the Division of Indi § 1977

1977 Australian federal election: Indi
Party	Candidate	Votes	%	±%
National Country	Mac Holten	21,832	35.9	−25.6
Liberal	Ewen Cameron	15,924	26.2	+26.2
Labor	John Dennis	15,316	25.2	−0.7
Democrats	Neil Savage	4,333	7.1	+7.1
Democratic Labor	Christopher Cody	3,407	5.6	−0.7
Total formal votes		60,812	97.1	
Informal votes		1,784	2.9	
Turnout		62,596	96.2	
Two-party-preferred result
Liberal	Ewen Cameron	33,483	55.1	+55.1
National Country	Mac Holten	27,329	44.9	−22.3
Liberal gain from National Country		Swing	+22.3	

=== Isaacs ===
This section is an excerpt from Electoral results for the Division of Isaacs § 1977

1977 Australian federal election: Isaacs
Party	Candidate	Votes	%	±%
Liberal	Bill Burns	29,857	44.4	−6.8
Labor	Kenneth Williams	23,275	34.6	−8.2
Democrats	Francis McLeod	11,427	17.0	+17.0
Democratic Labor	Ralph Cleary	2,741	4.1	+0.8
Total formal votes		67,300	97.7	
Informal votes		1,550	2.3	
Turnout		68,850	95.9	
Two-party-preferred result
Liberal	Bill Burns	38,595	57.3	+2.4
Labor	Kenneth Williams	28,705	42.7	−2.4
Liberal hold		Swing	+2.4	

=== Kooyong ===
This section is an excerpt from Electoral results for the Division of Kooyong § 1977

1977 Australian federal election: Kooyong
Party	Candidate	Votes	%	±%
Liberal	Andrew Peacock	36,791	55.6	−6.0
Labor	John Wilkinson	16,988	25.7	−4.6
Democrats	Michael McBride	8,176	12.4	+12.4
Democratic Labor	Bernie Gaynor	4,209	6.4	+0.5
Total formal votes		66,164	97.9	
Informal votes		1,388	2.1	
Turnout		67,552	93.6	
Two-party-preferred result
Liberal	Andrew Peacock		67.7	−0.2
Labor	John Wilkinson		32.3	+0.2
Liberal hold		Swing	−0.2	

=== La Trobe ===
This section is an excerpt from Electoral results for the Division of La Trobe § 1977

1977 Australian federal election: La Trobe
Party	Candidate	Votes	%	±%
Liberal	Marshall Baillieu	26,060	41.6	−8.9
Labor	Tony Lamb	25,250	40.3	−3.2
Democrats	Andrew McCann	8,827	14.1	+14.1
Democratic Labor	James Penna	1,410	2.3	+0.0
Independent	Cornelus Hellema	1,099	1.8	−0.4
Total formal votes		62,646	97.3	
Informal votes		1,725	2.7	
Turnout		64,371	95.9	
Two-party-preferred result
Liberal	Marshall Baillieu	31,845	50.8	−3.5
Labor	Tony Lamb	30,801	49.2	+3.5
Liberal hold		Swing	−3.5	

=== Lalor ===
This section is an excerpt from Electoral results for the Division of Lalor § 1977

1977 Australian federal election: Lalor
Party	Candidate	Votes	%	±%
Labor	Barry Jones	31,693	50.5	−7.1
Liberal	Harley Dickinson	17,633	28.1	−7.0
Democrats	Charles Skidmore	6,196	9.9	+9.9
Democratic Labor	Denis Bilston	5,502	8.8	+1.6
Independent	Rosalba Vicari	1,002	1.6	+1.6
Independent	Jeffrey Day	729	1.2	+1.2
Total formal votes		62,755	94.6	
Informal votes		3,561	5.4	
Turnout		66,316	96.4	
Two-party-preferred result
Labor	Barry Jones		57.6	−1.6
Liberal	Harley Dickinson		42.4	+1.6
Labor hold		Swing	−1.6	

=== Mallee ===
This section is an excerpt from Electoral results for the Division of Mallee § 1977

1977 Australian federal election: Mallee
Party	Candidate	Votes	%	±%
National Country	Peter Fisher	29,613	48.3	−20.2
Liberal	Warwick Hincksman	14,581	23.8	+23.8
Labor	Geoffrey Ferns	13,362	21.8	−3.2
Democratic Labor	John Cotter	3,707	6.1	−0.4
Total formal votes		61,263	97.5	
Informal votes		1,546	2.5	
Turnout		62,809	96.6	
Two-party-preferred result
National Country	Peter Fisher		73.3	−0.2
Labor	Geoffrey Ferns		26.7	+0.2
National Country hold		Swing	−0.2	

=== Maribyrnong ===
This section is an excerpt from Electoral results for the Division of Maribyrnong § 1977

1977 Australian federal election: Maribyrnong
Party	Candidate	Votes	%	±%
Labor	Moss Cass	27,927	43.6	−4.1
Liberal	Philip Fitzherbert	23,560	36.7	−7.1
Democrats	Alan Brass	8,651	13.5	+13.5
Democratic Labor	Alan Tait	3,982	6.2	+0.6
Total formal votes		64,120	96.8	
Informal votes		2,137	3.2	
Turnout		66,257	97.0	
Two-party-preferred result
Labor	Moss Cass	33,313	52.0	+1.7
Liberal	Philip Fitzherbert	30,807	48.0	−1.7
Labor hold		Swing	+1.7	

=== McMillan ===
This section is an excerpt from Electoral results for the Division of McMillan § 1977

1977 Australian federal election: McMillan
Party	Candidate	Votes	%	±%
Liberal	Barry Simon	27,650	44.5	+11.9
Labor	Richard Elkington	21,999	35.4	−4.2
Democrats	Ronald Dent	8,844	14.2	+14.2
Democratic Labor	Brian Handley	3,010	4.8	+0.9
Independent	Norman Holyoak	667	1.1	+1.1
Total formal votes		62,170	97.1	
Informal votes		1,847	2.9	
Turnout		64,017	96.3	
Two-party-preferred result
Liberal	Barry Simon	34,077	54.8	−1.9
Labor	Richard Elkington	28,093	45.2	+1.9
Liberal hold		Swing	−1.9	

=== Melbourne ===
This section is an excerpt from Electoral results for the Division of Melbourne § 1977

1977 Australian federal election: Melbourne
Party	Candidate	Votes	%	±%
Labor	Ted Innes	33,806	54.1	−5.1
Liberal	Robert Fallshaw	14,751	23.6	−4.4
Democratic Labor	Desmond Burke	6,868	11.0	+1.9
Democrats	Veronica Schwarz	5,576	8.9	+8.9
Communist	Roger Wilson	1,537	2.5	+1.1
Total formal votes		62,538	95.3	
Informal votes		3,069	4.7	
Turnout		65,607	90.9	
Two-party-preferred result
Labor	Ted Innes		61.8	−0.9
Liberal	Robert Fallshaw		38.2	+0.9
Labor hold		Swing	−0.9	

=== Melbourne Ports ===
This section is an excerpt from Electoral results for the Division of Melbourne Ports § 1977

1977 Australian federal election: Melbourne Ports
Party	Candidate	Votes	%	±%
Labor	Clyde Holding	31,308	50.0	−5.5
Liberal	Daniel Hill	20,627	33.0	−5.0
Democrats	Valina Rainer	6,147	9.8	+9.8
Democratic Labor	Gordon Haberman	4,495	7.2	+4.5
Total formal votes		62,577	96.1	
Informal votes		2,567	3.9	
Turnout		65,144	90.9	
Two-party-preferred result
Labor	Clyde Holding		55.5	−2.8
Liberal	Daniel Hill		44.5	+2.8
Labor hold		Swing	−2.8	

=== Murray ===
This section is an excerpt from Electoral results for the Division of Murray § 1977

1977 Australian federal election: Murray
Party	Candidate	Votes	%	±%
National Country	Bruce Lloyd	32,809	52.7	−17.1
Labor	Graeme Macartney	10,573	17.0	−7.3
Liberal	Robert Love	9,230	14.9	+14.9
Democrats	George Murray	6,612	10.6	+10.6
Democratic Labor	Patrick Payne	2,915	4.7	−1.1
Total formal votes		62,139	97.3	
Informal votes		1,749	2.7	
Turnout		63,888	96.8	
Two-party-preferred result
National Country	Bruce Lloyd		76.2	+1.1
Labor	Graeme Macartney		23.8	−1.1
National Country hold		Swing	+1.1	

=== Scullin ===
This section is an excerpt from Electoral results for the Division of Scullin § 1977

1977 Australian federal election: Scullin
Party	Candidate	Votes	%	±%
Labor	Harry Jenkins	32,303	51.8	−2.0
Liberal	Gerard Clarke	20,849	33.5	−4.7
Democrats	George Samargis	5,835	9.4	+9.4
Democratic Labor	Bernard McGrath	3,330	5.3	+0.2
Total formal votes		62,317	96.4	
Informal votes		2,314	3.6	
Turnout		64,631	96.4	
Two-party-preferred result
Labor	Harry Jenkins		57.0	+1.2
Liberal	Gerard Clarke		43.0	−1.2
Labor hold		Swing	+1.2	

=== Wannon ===
This section is an excerpt from Electoral results for the Division of Wannon § 1977

1977 Australian federal election: Wannon
Party	Candidate	Votes	%	±%
Liberal	Malcolm Fraser	35,640	56.7	−2.8
Labor	Andrew Frost	19,483	31.0	−4.2
Democratic Labor	John Casanova	4,125	6.6	+1.3
Democrats	Thelma Trayling	3,617	5.8	+5.8
Total formal votes		62,865	98.5	
Informal votes		968	1.5	
Turnout		63,833	97.2	
Two-party-preferred result
Liberal	Malcolm Fraser		65.6	+1.2
Labor	Andrew Frost		34.4	−1.2
Liberal hold		Swing	+1.2	

=== Wills ===
This section is an excerpt from Electoral results for the Division of Wills § 1977

1977 Australian federal election: Wills
Party	Candidate	Votes	%	±%
Labor	Gordon Bryant	38,456	57.6	−0.5
Liberal	Thomas Burrowes	17,597	26.4	−8.4
Democrats	Vernon Weaver	5,703	8.5	+8.5
Democratic Labor	John Flint	4,964	7.4	+0.3
Total formal votes		66,703	96.1	
Informal votes		2,702	3.9	
Turnout		69,442	94.5	
Two-party-preferred result
Labor	Gordon Bryant		62.6	+3.8
Liberal	Thomas Burrowes		37.4	−3.8
Labor hold		Swing	+3.8	

== Queensland ==
1977 Australian federal election (Queensland)
← 1975	10 December 1977	1980 →

All 19 Queensland seats in the House of Representatives 10 seats needed for a majority
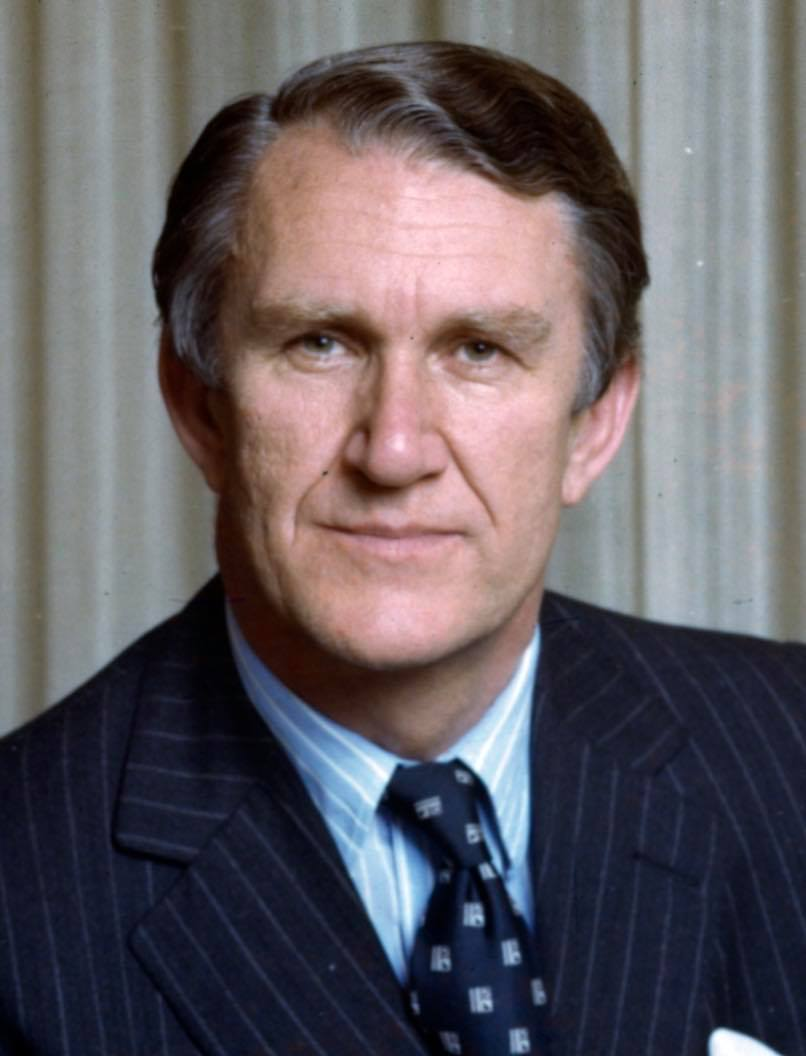

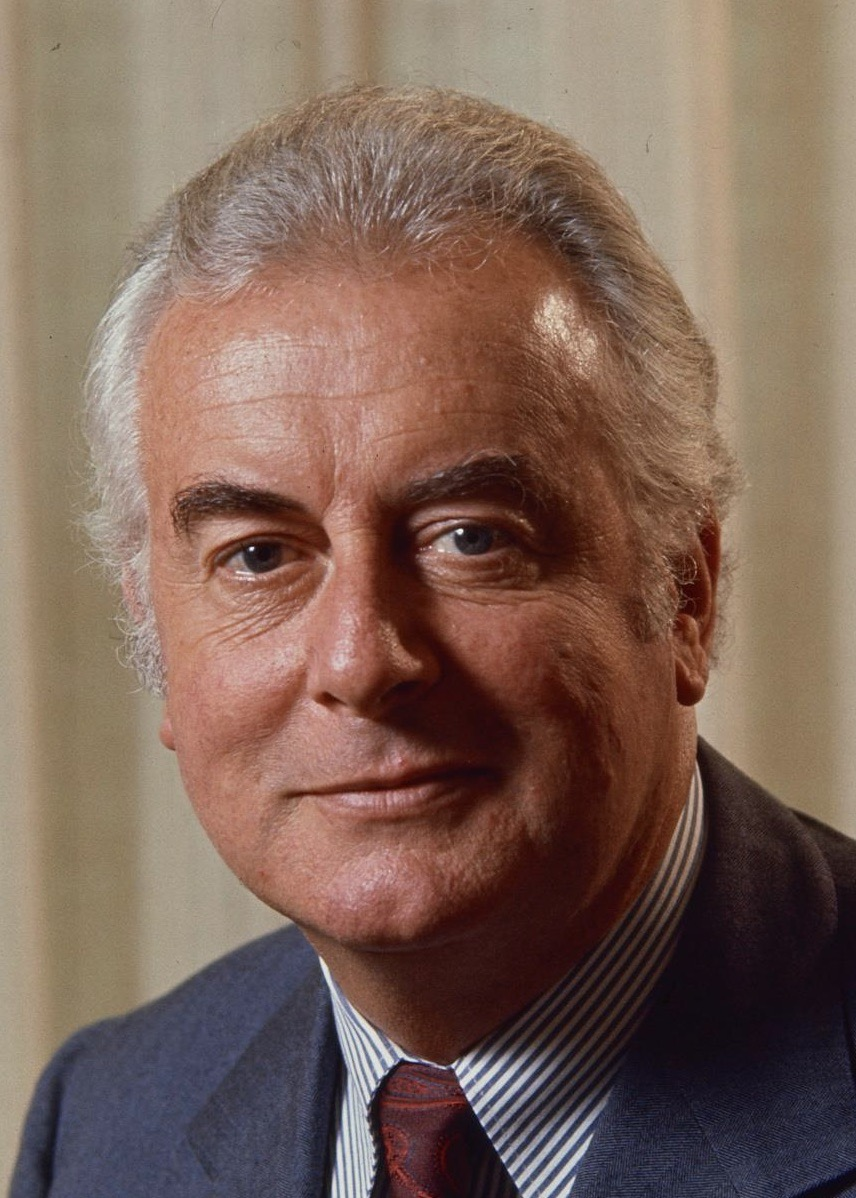
	First party	Second party
Leader	Malcolm Fraser	Gough Whitlam
Party	Coalition	Labor
Seats before	17	1
Seats won	16	3
Seat change	▼1	▲2
Popular vote	631,410	443,221
Percentage	53.7%	37.7%
Swing	▼5.6pp	▼1.1pp
TPP	58.0%	42.0%
TPP swing	▼2.2pp	▲2.2pp

=== Bowman ===
This section is an excerpt from Electoral results for the Division of Bowman § 1977

1977 Australian federal election: Bowman
Party	Candidate	Votes	%	±%
Liberal	David Jull	31,544	50.0	+3.0
Labor	Len Keogh	25,078	39.7	−2.3
Democrats	Bryan Grehan	5,452	8.6	+8.6
Progress	Martin Gant	1,018	1.6	+1.6
Total formal votes		63,092	98.6	
Informal votes		875	1.4	
Turnout		63,967	95.3	
Two-party-preferred result
Liberal	David Jull		56.3	−1.0
Labor	Len Keogh		43.7	+1.0
Liberal hold		Swing	−1.0	

=== Brisbane ===
This section is an excerpt from Electoral results for the Division of Brisbane § 1977

1977 Australian federal election: Brisbane
Party	Candidate	Votes	%	±%
Liberal	Peter Johnson	29,821	47.1	−1.5
Labor	Manfred Cross	26,103	41.3	+0.5
Democrats	Joan Hadley	6,299	10.0	+10.0
Progress	John Steele	1,038	1.6	−0.2
Total formal votes		63,261	98.4	
Informal votes		1,022	1.6	
Turnout		64,283	94.6	
Two-party-preferred result
Liberal	Peter Johnson	33,676	53.2	−5.2
Labor	Manfred Cross	29,585	46.8	+5.2
Liberal hold		Swing	−5.2	

=== Capricornia ===
This section is an excerpt from Electoral results for the Division of Capricornia § 1977

1977 Australian federal election: Capricornia
Party	Candidate	Votes	%	±%
Labor	Doug Everingham	29,996	48.9	+2.0
National Country	Colin Carige	25,314	41.3	+13.6
Liberal	Douglas Cuddy	3,606	5.9	−19.5
Democrats	Edward Batey	2,217	3.6	+3.6
Progress	Ronald Kitching	207	0.3	+0.3
Total formal votes		61,340	98.7	
Informal votes		784	1.3	
Turnout		62,124	96.0	
Two-party-preferred result
Labor	Doug Everingham		51.2	+2.7
National Country	Colin Carige		48.8	−2.7
Labor gain from National Country		Swing	+3.1	

=== Darling Downs ===
This section is an excerpt from Electoral results for the Division of Darling Downs § 1977

1977 Australian federal election: Darling Downs
Party	Candidate	Votes	%	±%
National Country	Tom McVeigh	42,630	68.1	+1.2
Labor	Robert Lingard	18,505	29.6	−3.5
Progress	David Proud	1,482	2.4	+2.4
Total formal votes		62,617	98.9	
Informal votes		677	1.1	
Turnout		63,294	94.8	
Two-party-preferred result
National Country	Tom McVeigh		70.3	+3.4
Labor	Robert Lingard		29.7	−3.4
National Country hold		Swing	+3.4	

=== Dawson ===
This section is an excerpt from Electoral results for the Division of Dawson § 1977

1977 Australian federal election: Dawson
Party	Candidate	Votes	%	±%
National Country	Ray Braithwaite	34,624	55.9	+3.1
Labor	Michael Goldsborough	25,923	41.9	−3.9
Progress	Frank Paull	1,377	2.2	+2.2
Total formal votes		61,924	98.9	
Informal votes		687	1.1	
Turnout		62,611	94.9	
Two-party-preferred result
National Country	Ray Braithwaite		57.9	+4.3
Labor	Michael Goldsborough		42.1	−4.3
National hold		Swing	+4.3	

=== Fadden ===
This section is an excerpt from Electoral results for the Division of Fadden § 1977

1977 Australian federal election: Fadden
Party	Candidate	Votes	%	±%
Labor	Clem Jones	23,869	38.4	+2.6
Liberal	Don Cameron	20,909	33.6	−22.3
National Country	James Shapcott	10,910	17.5	+12.5
Democrats	Janice Barber	5,559	8.9	+8.9
Independent	Melody Bond	717	1.2	+1.2
Progress	Peter Gautrey	206	0.3	+0.3
Total formal votes		62,170	97.9	
Informal votes		1,322	2.1	
Turnout		63,492	94.8	
Two-party-preferred result
Liberal	Don Cameron	34,811	56.0	−6.5
Labor	Clem Jones	27,359	44.0	+6.5
Liberal notional hold		Swing	−6.5	

=== Fisher ===
This section is an excerpt from Electoral results for the Division of Fisher § 1977

1977 Australian federal election: Fisher
Party	Candidate	Votes	%	±%
National Country	Evan Adermann	37,247	59.6	−6.4
Labor	Fay Price	18,187	29.1	−1.9
Democrats	Gillian Newman	6,110	9.8	+9.8
Progress	Gregory Gaffney	983	1.6	−1.4
Total formal votes		62,527	98.6	
Informal votes		861	1.4	
Turnout		63,388	95.7	
Two-party-preferred result
National Country	Evan Adermann		65.9	−2.5
Labor	Fay Price		34.1	+2.5
National Country hold		Swing	−2.5	

=== Griffith ===
This section is an excerpt from Electoral results for the Division of Griffith § 1977

1977 Australian federal election: Griffith
Party	Candidate	Votes	%	±%
Labor	Ben Humphreys	28,736	47.0	−1.1
Liberal	Ronald Palmer	20,471	33.5	−16.6
National Country	Stan Fas	5,935	9.7	+9.7
Democrats	Thomas Martin	4,857	7.9	+7.9
Independent	William Kenney	591	1.0	+1.0
Progress	Barrie Rundle	514	0.8	−1.0
Total formal votes		61,104	96.8	
Informal votes		2,025	3.2	
Turnout		63,129	92.8	
Two-party-preferred result
Labor	Ben Humphreys		53.5	+5.0
Liberal	Ronald Palmer		46.5	−5.0
Labor gain from Liberal		Swing	+5.0	

=== Herbert ===
This section is an excerpt from Electoral results for the Division of Herbert § 1977

1977 Australian federal election: Herbert
Party	Candidate	Votes	%	±%
Labor	Ted Lindsay	22,668	37.0	−5.5
Liberal	Gordon Dean	20,559	33.5	−24.0
National Country	Charles Arnold	12,357	20.2	+20.2
Democrats	Kenneth Kipping	4,799	7.8	+7.8
Independent	Grahame Wells	418	0.7	+0.7
Progress	Coral Finlay	250	0.4	+0.4
Independent	Peter Dunn	236	0.4	+0.4
Total formal votes		61,287	98.4	
Informal votes		1,014	1.6	
Turnout		62,301	94.5	
Two-party-preferred result
Liberal	Gordon Dean	35,353	57.7	+0.2
Labor	Ted Lindsay	25,934	42.3	−0.2
Liberal hold		Swing	+0.2	

=== Kennedy ===
This section is an excerpt from Electoral results for the Division of Kennedy § 1977

1977 Australian federal election: Kennedy
Party	Candidate	Votes	%	±%
National Country	Bob Katter, Sr.	33,453	61.4	−2.1
Labor	Robert Gleeson	17,814	32.7	−2.0
Democrats	Raymond Oldham	1,744	3.2	+3.2
Progress	Vrettos Cominos	987	1.8	+0.0
Democrats	Marelle Hicks	521	1.0	+1.0
Total formal votes		54,519	98.4	
Informal votes		913	1.6	
Turnout		55,432	92.9	
Two-party-preferred result
National Country	Bob Katter, Sr.		64.2	−0.7
Labor	Robert Gleeson		35.8	+0.7
National Country hold		Swing	−0.7	

=== Leichhardt ===
This section is an excerpt from Electoral results for the Division of Leichhardt § 1977

1977 Australian federal election: Leichhardt
Party	Candidate	Votes	%	±%
National Country	David Thomson	27,684	47.3	+9.1
Labor	Bill Wood	27,078	46.3	−0.2
Democrats	James Foster	3,785	6.5	+6.5
Total formal votes		58,547	98.6	
Informal votes		846	1.4	
Turnout		59,393	93.1	
Two-party-preferred result
National Country	David Thomson	29,803	50.9	−1.5
Labor	Bill Wood	28,744	49.1	+1.5
National Country hold		Swing	−1.5	

=== Lilley ===
This section is an excerpt from Electoral results for the Division of Lilley § 1977

1977 Australian federal election: Lilley
Party	Candidate	Votes	%	±%
Liberal	Kevin Cairns	30,542	48.6	−3.3
Labor	Elaine Darling	24,661	39.2	−2.0
Democrats	Albert Mayne	5,302	8.4	+8.4
Independent	Frank Andrews	1,970	3.1	+3.1
Progress	Gary Sturgess	386	0.6	+0.6
Total formal votes		62,861	98.3	
Informal votes		1,056	1.7	
Turnout		63,917	95.2	
Two-party-preferred result
Liberal	Kevin Cairns		56.0	−1.2
Labor	Elaine Darling		44.0	+1.2
Liberal hold		Swing	−1.2	

=== Maranoa ===
This section is an excerpt from Electoral results for the Division of Maranoa § 1977

1977 Australian federal election: Maranoa
Party	Candidate	Votes	%	±%
National Country	James Corbett	41,466	68.7	−1.9
Labor	John Kidman	14,320	23.7	−1.8
Democrats	Betty Whitworth	2,012	3.3	+3.3
Independent	Christopher Caldwell	1,663	2.8	+2.8
Progress	Maurice Fountain	879	1.5	−2.4
Total formal votes		60,340	98.5	
Informal votes		925	1.5	
Turnout		61,265	95.3	
Two-party-preferred result
National Country	James Corbett		73.6	−0.1
Labor	John Kidman		26.4	+0.1
National Country hold		Swing	−0.1	

=== McPherson ===
This section is an excerpt from Electoral results for the Division of McPherson § 1977

1977 Australian federal election: McPherson
Party	Candidate	Votes	%	±%
Liberal	Eric Robinson	37,962	60.1	−4.3
Labor	Jon Guerson	17,419	27.6	−4.5
Democrats	Leonard Fairman	5,819	9.2	+9.2
Independent	William Aabraham-Steer	964	1.5	+1.5
Progress	Neva Maxim	951	1.5	−2.0
Total formal votes		63,115	98.2	
Informal votes		1,138	1.8	
Turnout		64,253	94.5	
Two-party-preferred result
Liberal	Eric Robinson		66.3	−0.1
Labor	Jon Guerson		33.7	+0.1
Liberal hold		Swing	−0.1	

=== Moreton ===
This section is an excerpt from Electoral results for the Division of Moreton § 1977

1977 Australian federal election: Moreton
Party	Candidate	Votes	%	±%
Liberal	James Killen	34,231	56.0	−6.1
Labor	Barbara Robson	20,864	34.1	−1.6
Democrats	Dirk Plooy	4,278	7.0	+7.0
Independent	Graham Bell	915	1.5	+1.5
Progress	Frederick Drake	887	1.4	+1.4
Total formal votes		61,175	98.5	
Informal votes		903	1.5	
Turnout		62,078	95.0	
Two-party-preferred result
Liberal	James Killen		62.0	−0.7
Labor	Barbara Robson		38.0	+0.7
Liberal hold		Swing	−0.7	

=== Oxley ===
This section is an excerpt from Electoral results for the Division of Oxley § 1977

1977 Australian federal election: Oxley
Party	Candidate	Votes	%	±%
Labor	Bill Hayden	36,084	55.0	+4.8
Liberal	Robert Walker	24,306	37.0	+14.3
Democrats	Rowlynd Jones	4,446	6.8	+6.8
Progress	Neil Russell	784	1.2	−1.0
Total formal votes		65,620	98.6	
Informal votes		910	1.4	
Turnout		66,530	95.6	
Two-party-preferred result
Labor	Bill Hayden		58.5	+4.7
Liberal	Robert Walker		41.5	+41.5
Labor hold		Swing	+4.7	

=== Petrie ===
This section is an excerpt from Electoral results for the Division of Petrie § 1977

1977 Australian federal election: Petrie
Party	Candidate	Votes	%	±%
Liberal	John Hodges	33,853	52.8	−9.7
Labor	Gerard Molloy	21,774	34.0	−3.5
Democrats	Leslie Mundt	7,648	11.9	+11.9
Progress	Rodney Jeanneret	823	1.3	+1.3
Total formal votes		64,098	98.7	
Informal votes		819	1.3	
Turnout		64,917	96.0	
Two-party-preferred result
Liberal	John Hodges		59.9	−2.6
Labor	Gerard Molloy		40.1	+2.6
Liberal hold		Swing	−2.6	

=== Ryan ===
This section is an excerpt from Electoral results for the Division of Ryan § 1977

1977 Australian federal election: Ryan
Party	Candidate	Votes	%	±%
Liberal	John Moore	38,331	61.0	+17.8
Labor	Gailene Harrison	20,866	33.2	+1.3
Progress	Jili Boughen	3,617	5.8	+5.8
Total formal votes		62,814	98.7	
Informal votes		798	1.3	
Turnout		63,612	95.0	
Two-party-preferred result
Liberal	John Moore		63.4	−3.1
Labor	Gailene Harrison		36.6	+3.1
Liberal hold		Swing	−3.1	

=== Wide Bay ===
This section is an excerpt from Electoral results for the Division of Wide Bay § 1977

1977 Australian federal election: Wide Bay
Party	Candidate	Votes	%	±%
National Country	Clarrie Millar	33,252	53.2	−4.5
Labor	Frederick Faircloth	23,276	36.8	−2.5
Democrats	Douglas Mackenzie	6,321	10.0	+10.0
Total formal votes		63,252	99.0	
Informal votes		637	1.0	
Turnout		63,889	95.9	
Two-party-preferred result
National Country	Clarrie Millar		58.2	−1.1
Labor	Frederick Faircloth		41.8	+1.1
National Country hold		Swing	−1.1	

== South Australia ==
1977 Australian federal election (South Australia)
← 1975	10 December 1977	1980 →

All 11 SA seats in the House of Representatives 6 seats needed for a majority
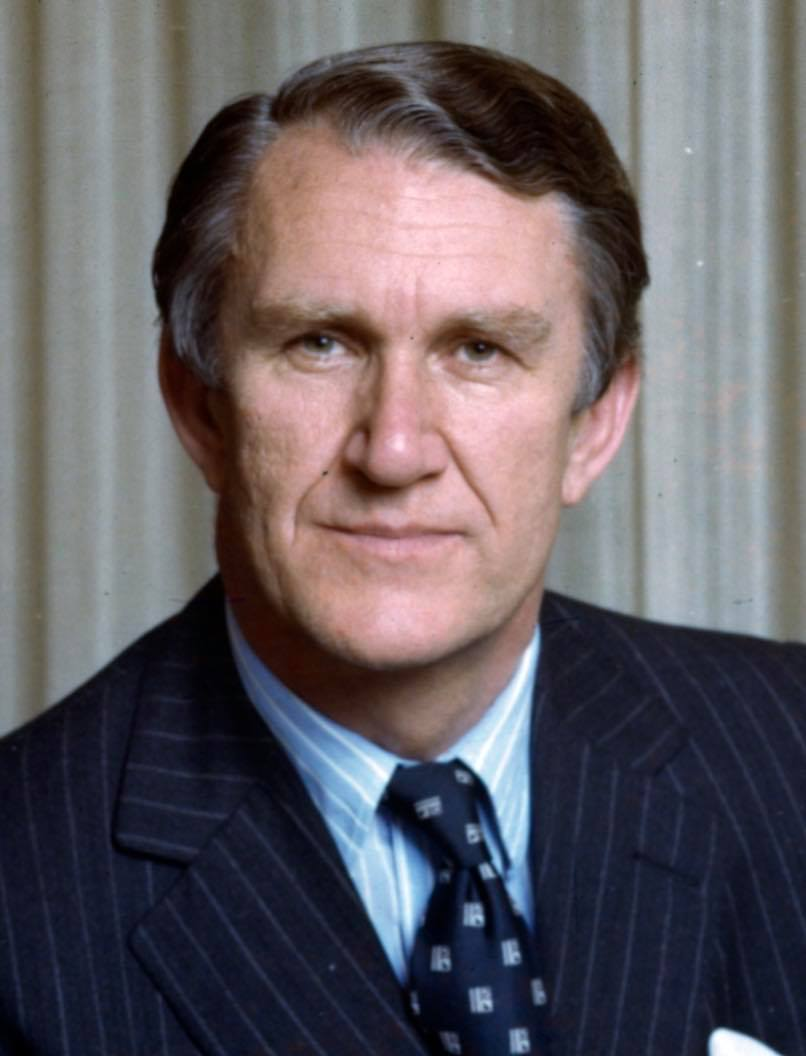

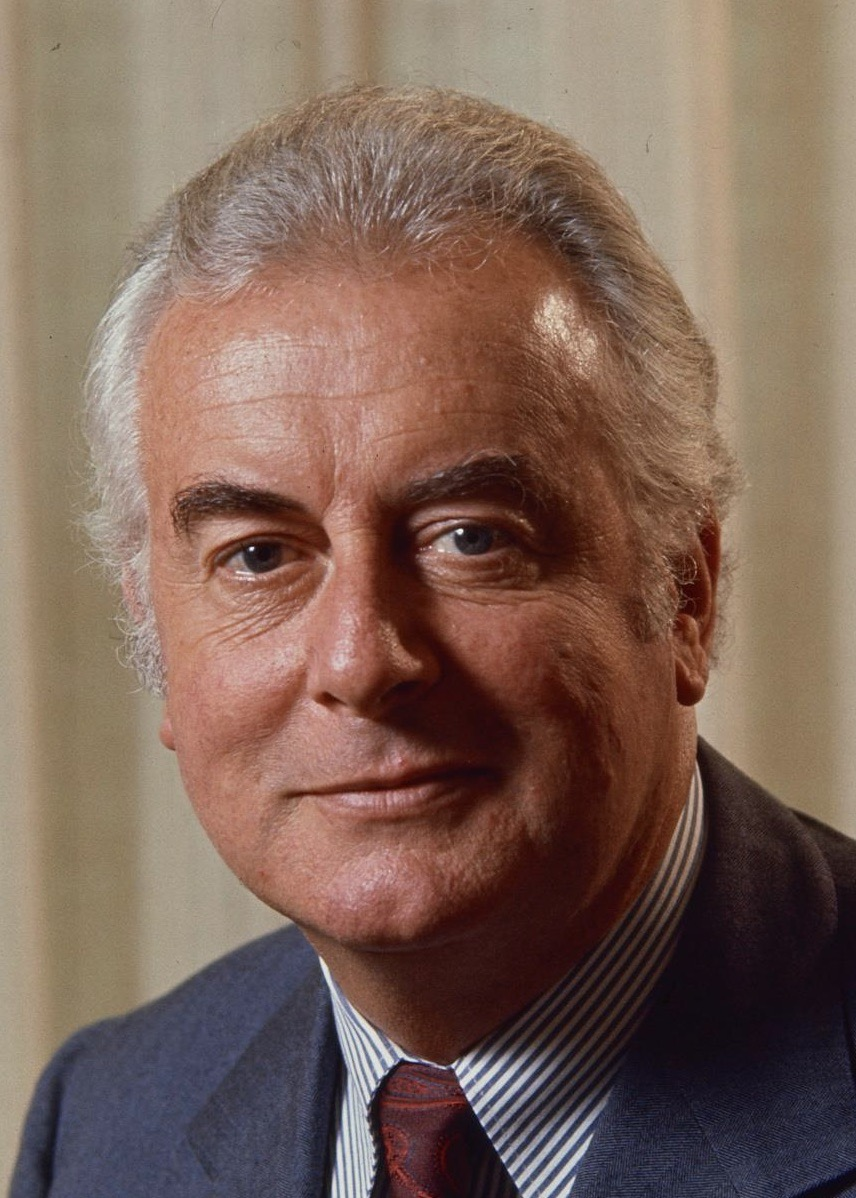
	First party	Second party
Leader	Malcolm Fraser	Gough Whitlam
Party	Coalition	Labor
Seats before	6	6
Seats won	5	6
Seat change	▼1	Steady
Popular vote	631,410	443,221
Percentage	53.7%	37.7%
Swing	▼5.6pp	▼1.1pp
TPP	51.3%	48.7%
TPP swing	▼3.8pp	▲3.8pp

=== Adelaide ===
This section is an excerpt from Electoral results for the Division of Adelaide § 1977

1977 Australian federal election: Adelaide
Party	Candidate	Votes	%	±%
Labor	Chris Hurford	35,786	50.9	+0.9
Liberal	George Basisovs	26,974	38.3	−4.2
Democrats	Geoffrey Stewart	7,610	10.8	+10.8
Total formal votes		70,370	96.3	
Informal votes		2,728	3.7	
Turnout		73,098	93.9	
Two-party-preferred result
Labor	Chris Hurford		56.3	+3.0
Liberal	George Basisovs		43.7	−3.0
Labor hold		Swing	+3.0	

=== Barker ===
This section is an excerpt from Electoral results for the Division of Barker § 1977

1977 Australian federal election: Barker
Party	Candidate	Votes	%	±%
Liberal	James Porter	43,129	63.4	+3.9
Labor	Neil Richardson	18,968	27.9	−1.7
Democrats	Rodney Roberts	5,952	8.7	+8.7
Total formal votes		68,049	97.2	
Informal votes		1,980	2.8	
Turnout		70,029	95.4	
Two-party-preferred result
Liberal	James Porter		67.8	−0.5
Labor	Rodney Roberts		32.2	+0.5
Liberal hold		Swing	−0.5	

=== Bonython ===
This section is an excerpt from Electoral results for the Division of Bonython § 1977

1977 Australian federal election: Bonython
Party	Candidate	Votes	%	±%
Labor	Neal Blewett	33,772	50.5	+2.1
Liberal	Brian Marsden	20,595	30.8	−8.9
Democrats	John Longhurst	12,457	18.6	+18.6
Total formal votes		66,824	96.0	
Informal votes		2,814	4.0	
Turnout		69,638	94.4	
Two-party-preferred result
Labor	Neal Blewett		59.8	+6.1
Liberal	Brian Marsden		40.2	−6.1
Labor hold		Swing	+6.1	

=== Boothby ===
This section is an excerpt from Electoral results for the Division of Boothby § 1977

1977 Australian federal election: Boothby
Party	Candidate	Votes	%	±%
Liberal	John McLeay	40,358	57.4	−3.5
Labor	Mark Pickhaver	18,117	25.8	−2.2
Democrats	George Nimmo	11,795	16.8	+16.8
Total formal votes		70,270	97.7	
Informal votes		1,627	2.3	
Turnout		71,897	95.0	
Two-party-preferred result
Liberal	John McLeay		65.8	−3.5
Labor	Mark Pickhaver		34.2	+3.5
Liberal hold		Swing	−3.5	

=== Grey ===
This section is an excerpt from Electoral results for the Division of Grey § 1977

1977 Australian federal election: Grey
Party	Candidate	Votes	%	±%
Labor	Laurie Wallis	31,221	46.7	+0.7
Liberal	John Oswald	26,166	39.2	−10.6
National Country	John Henderson	6,065	9.1	+9.1
Democrats	Ronald Moulds	3,331	5.0	+5.0
Total formal votes		66,783	96.9	
Informal votes		2,152	3.1	
Turnout		68,935	94.8	
Two-party-preferred result
Labor	Laurie Wallis	33,424	50.0	+2.9
Liberal	John Oswald	33,359	50.0	−2.9
Labor notional gain from Liberal		Swing	+2.9	

=== Hawker ===
This section is an excerpt from Electoral results for the Division of Hawker § 1977

1977 Australian federal election: Hawker
Party	Candidate	Votes	%	±%
Labor	Ralph Jacobi	31,685	44.8	−2.2
Liberal	Steele Hall	31,062	44.0	−2.4
Democrats	Bruce Miels	7,190	10.2	+10.2
Independent	Warren Wallace	724	1.0	+1.0
Total formal votes		70,661	97.0	
Informal votes		2,206	3.0	
Turnout		72,867	94.3	
Two-party-preferred result
Labor	Ralph Jacobi	35,760	50.6	+2.0
Liberal	Steele Hall	34,901	49.4	−2.0
Labor notional gain from Liberal		Swing	+2.0	

Ralph Jacobi (Labor) was the sitting member, however the effect of the 1977 redistribution was to give the Liberals a notional majority of 1.4%.

=== Hindmarsh ===
This section is an excerpt from Electoral results for the Division of Hindmarsh § 1977

1977 Australian federal election: Hindmarsh
Party	Candidate	Votes	%	±%
Labor	Clyde Cameron	38,976	55.2	+0.8
Liberal	Gregory Molfetas	22,962	32.5	−6.8
Democrats	James Evans	8,628	12.2	+12.2
Total formal votes		70,566	95.8	
Informal votes		3,061	4.2	
Turnout		73,627	95.4	
Two-party-preferred result
Labor	Clyde Cameron		61.3	+5.0
Liberal	Gregory Molfetas		38.7	−5.0
Labor hold		Swing	+5.0	

=== Kingston ===
This section is an excerpt from Electoral results for the Division of Kingston § 1977

1977 Australian federal election: Kingston
Party	Candidate	Votes	%	±%
Liberal	Grant Chapman	31,254	45.3	−3.0
Labor	Richard Gun	28,919	41.9	+0.0
Democrats	Christopher Harte	8,810	12.8	+12.8
Total formal votes		68,983	97.6	
Informal votes		1,697	2.4	
Turnout		70,680	96.2	
Two-party-preferred result
Liberal	Grant Chapman	35,732	51.8	−4.8
Labor	Richard Gun	33,251	48.2	+4.8
Liberal hold		Swing	−4.8	

=== Port Adelaide ===
This section is an excerpt from Electoral results for the Division of Port Adelaide § 1977

1977 Australian federal election: Port Adelaide
Party	Candidate	Votes	%	±%
Labor	Mick Young	40,497	60.0	−0.1
Liberal	Jean Lawrie	20,506	30.4	−4.7
Democrats	David Wade	4,906	7.3	+7.3
Communist	Donald Sutherland	1,575	2.3	+2.3
Total formal votes		67,484	94.5	
Informal votes		3,914	5.5	
Turnout		71,398	94.7	
Two-party-preferred result
Labor	Mick Young		65.7	+4.4
Liberal	Jean Lawrie		34.3	−4.4
Labor hold		Swing	+4.4	

=== Sturt ===
This section is an excerpt from Electoral results for the Division of Sturt § 1977

1977 Australian federal election: Sturt
Party	Candidate	Votes	%	±%
Liberal	Ian Wilson	35,300	51.0	−3.7
Labor	Ann Pengelly	24,639	35.6	−2.2
Democrats	Dean Bendall	9,335	13.5	+13.5
Total formal votes		69,274	96.9	
Informal votes		2,235	3.1	
Turnout		71,509	95.6	
Two-party-preferred result
Liberal	Ian Wilson		57.3	−2.5
Labor	Ann Pengelly		35.6	+2.5
Liberal hold		Swing	−2.5	

=== Wakefield ===
This section is an excerpt from Electoral results for the Division of Wakefield § 1977

1977 Australian federal election: Wakefield
Party	Candidate	Votes	%	±%
Liberal	Geoffrey Giles	42,077	61.9	−4.7
Labor	Denis Crisp	20,303	29.9	+4.2
Democrats	Kenneth Maguire	5,564	8.2	+8.2
Total formal votes		67,944	97.1	
Informal votes		2,047	2.9	
Turnout		69,991	96.2	
Two-party-preferred result
Liberal	Geoffrey Giles		66.0	−6.4
Labor	Denis Crisp		34.0	+6.4
Liberal hold		Swing	−6.4	

== Western Australia ==
1977 Australian federal election (Western Australia)
← 1975	10 December 1977	1980 →

All 10 WA seats in the House of Representatives 5 seats needed for a majority
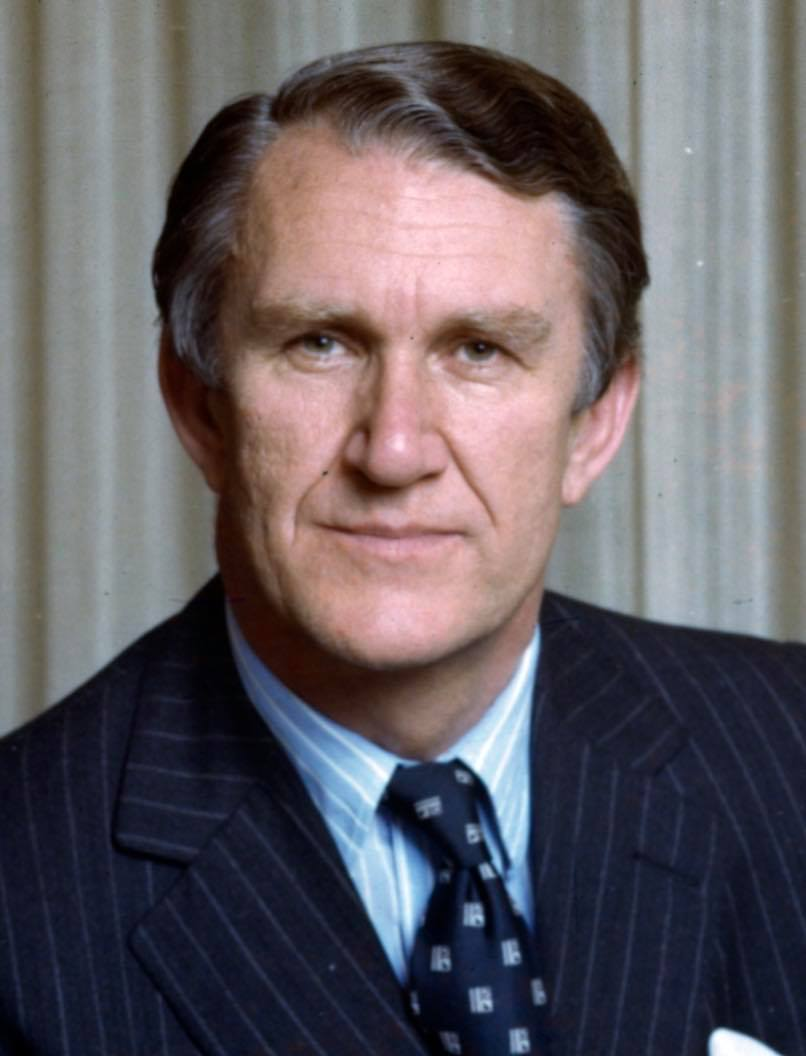

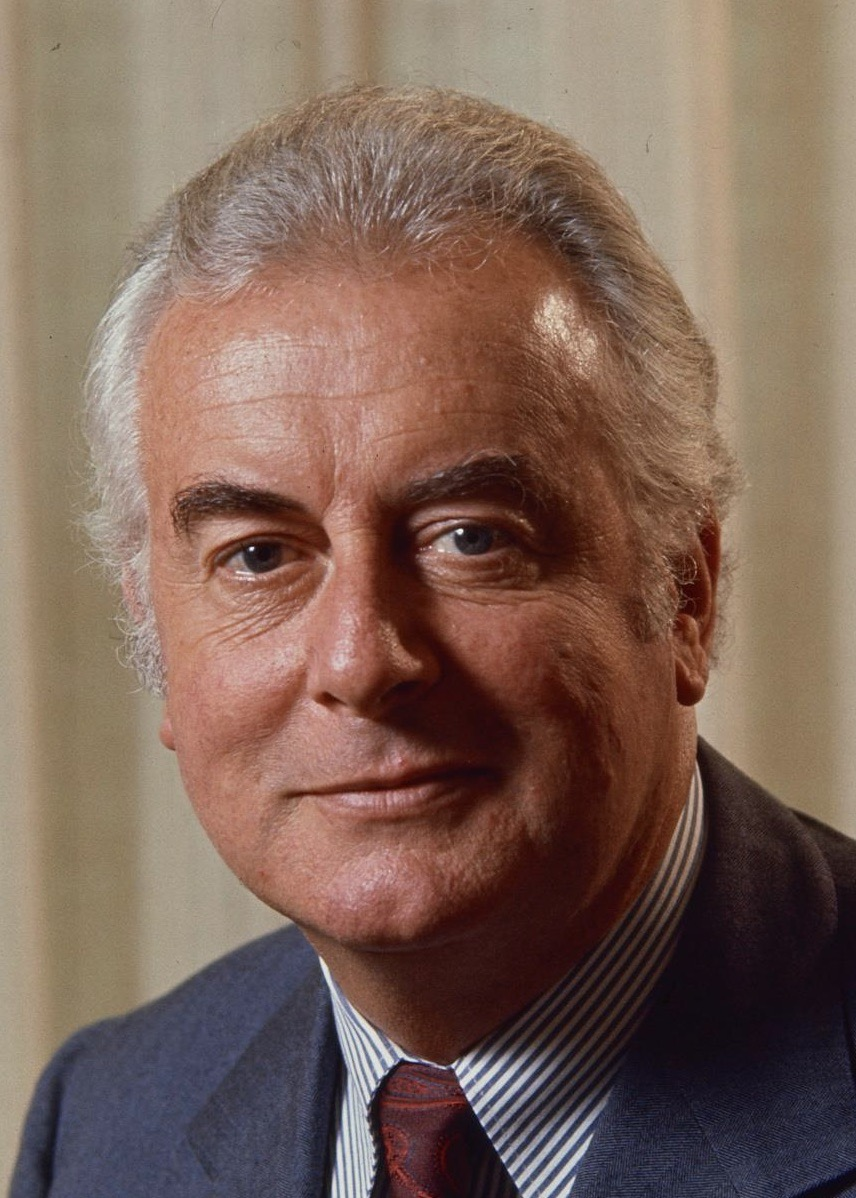
	First party	Second party
Leader	Malcolm Fraser	Gough Whitlam
Party	Coalition	Labor
Seats before	9	1
Seats won	9	1
Seat change	Steady	Steady
Popular vote	346,448	322,883
Percentage	45.8%	42.6%
Swing	▼4.1pp	Steady
TPP	60.1%	39.9%
TPP swing	▲1.3pp	▼1.3pp

=== Canning ===
This section is an excerpt from Electoral results for the Division of Canning § 1977

1977 Australian federal election: Canning
Party	Candidate	Votes	%	±%
Liberal	Mel Bungey	29,503	48.2	+3.8
Labor	Charles Savage	16,491	26.9	−8.1
National Country	Marie Dilley	7,447	12.2	−8.3
Democrats	Velibor Debeljakovic	6,206	10.1	+10.1
Progress	Douglas Joyce	822	1.3	+1.3
Independent	John English	725	1.2	+1.2
Total formal votes		61,194	96.2	
Informal votes		2,389	3.8	
Turnout		63,583	95.5	
Two-party-preferred result
Liberal	Mel Bungey		66.3	+3.1
Labor	Charles Savage		33.7	−3.1
Liberal hold		Swing	+3.1	

=== Curtin ===
This section is an excerpt from Electoral results for the Division of Curtin § 1977

1977 Australian federal election: Curtin
Party	Candidate	Votes	%	±%
Liberal	Victor Garland	38,988	58.8	−7.5
Labor	Patricia Giles	16,207	24.4	−9.3
Democrats	Richard Bunting	9,522	14.4	+14.4
Progress	James MacDonald	1,628	2.5	+2.5
Total formal votes		66,345	97.6	
Informal votes		1,654	2.4	
Turnout		67,999	93.3	
Two-party-preferred result
Liberal	Victor Garland		68.8	+2.5
Labor	Patricia Giles		31.2	−2.5
Liberal hold		Swing	+2.5	

=== Forrest ===
This section is an excerpt from Electoral results for the Division of Forrest § 1977

1977 Australian federal election: Forrest
Party	Candidate	Votes	%	±%
Liberal	Peter Drummond	30,723	48.4	−8.1
Labor	Allan Drake-Brockman	17,640	27.8	−5.0
National Country	John Gardiner	8,183	12.9	+3.6
Democrats	Donald Stewart	4,466	7.0	+7.0
Progress	Reginald Crabb	2,495	3.9	+3.9
Total formal votes		63,507	96.8	
Informal votes		2,114	3.2	
Turnout		65,621	96.2	
Two-party-preferred result
Liberal	Peter Drummond		65.7	+0.1
Labor	Allan Drake-Brockman		34.3	−0.1
Liberal hold		Swing	+0.1	

=== Fremantle ===
This section is an excerpt from Electoral results for the Division of Fremantle § 1977

1977 Australian federal election: Fremantle
Party	Candidate	Votes	%	±%
Labor	John Dawkins	29,700	45.1	−6.5
Liberal	Peter Ramshaw	27,372	41.6	−6.8
Democrats	John Kernott	6,491	9.9	+9.9
Communist	Vic Slater	1,305	2.0	+2.0
Progress	David Lavater	957	1.5	+1.5
Total formal votes		65,825	96.7	
Informal votes		2,235	3.3	
Turnout		68,060	95.3	
Two-party-preferred result
Labor	John Dawkins	34,113	51.8	+0.2
Liberal	Peter Ramshaw	31,712	48.2	−0.2
Labor hold		Swing	+0.2	

=== Kalgoorlie ===
This section is an excerpt from Electoral results for the Division of Kalgoorlie § 1977

1977 Australian federal election: Kalgoorlie
Party	Candidate	Votes	%	±%
Liberal	Mick Cotter	27,512	49.3	−4.4
Labor	Brian Conway	20,862	37.4	−5.8
Democrats	Edwin Routley	3,534	6.3	+6.3
National Country	Squire Fletcher	2,399	4.3	+4.3
Progress	Graham Mills	1,529	2.7	−0.4
Total formal votes		55,836	96.8	
Informal votes		1,855	3.2	
Turnout		57,691	90.5	
Two-party-preferred result
Liberal	Mick Cotter		58.5	+2.3
Labor	Brian Conway		41.5	−2.3
Liberal hold		Swing	+2.3	

=== Moore ===
This section is an excerpt from Electoral results for the Division of Moore § 1977

1977 Australian federal election: Moore
Party	Candidate	Votes	%	±%
Liberal	John Hyde	29,516	47.8	−6.4
Labor	James Hansen	14,707	23.8	−8.6
Democrats	Patricia Edward	7,540	12.2	+12.2
National Country	Roy Clarke	7,530	12.2	−1.2
Progress	Maurice Brockwell	2,426	3.9	+3.9
Total formal votes		61,719	96.7	
Informal votes		2,116	3.3	
Turnout		63,835	94.9	
Two-party-preferred result
Liberal	John Hyde		67.9	+2.4
Labor	James Hansen		32.1	−2.4
Liberal hold		Swing	+2.4	

=== Perth ===
This section is an excerpt from Electoral results for the Division of Perth § 1977

1977 Australian federal election: Perth
Party	Candidate	Votes	%	±%
Liberal	Ross McLean	31,944	50.8	−5.6
Labor	James Moiler	22,177	35.3	−6.9
Democrats	Thomas Garrick	6,153	9.8	+9.8
Progress	Lawrence Curtis	2,591	4.1	+4.1
Total formal votes		62,865	96.5	
Informal votes		2,266	3.5	
Turnout		65,131	95.1	
Two-party-preferred result
Liberal	Ross McLean		59.5	−3.0
Labor	James Moiler		40.5	+3.0
Liberal hold		Swing	−3.0	

=== Stirling ===
This section is an excerpt from Electoral results for the Division of Stirling § 1977

1977 Australian federal election: Stirling
Party	Candidate	Votes	%	±%
Liberal	Ian Viner	32,558	50.2	−7.7
Labor	Graham Reece	20,786	32.1	−7.2
Democrats	Scott Christie	9,591	14.8	+14.8
Progress	James Jamieson	1,876	2.9	+0.1
Total formal votes		64,811	97.2	
Informal votes		1,850	2.8	
Turnout		66,661	94.7	
Two-party-preferred result
Liberal	Ian Viner		59.7	+0.4
Labor	Graham Reece		40.3	−0.4
Liberal hold		Swing	+0.4	

=== Swan ===
This section is an excerpt from Electoral results for the Division of Swan § 1977

1977 Australian federal election: Swan
Party	Candidate	Votes	%	±%
Liberal	John Martyr	27,385	42.9	−3.3
Labor	Patricia Fowkes	25,276	39.6	−10.2
Democrats	Hubert Lennerts	7,526	11.8	+11.8
Independent	William Deller	2,474	3.9	+3.9
Progress	Bryan Scott-Courtland	1,194	1.9	+1.9
Total formal votes		63,855	95.6	
Informal votes		2,936	4.4	
Turnout		66,791	95.1	
Two-party-preferred result
Liberal	John Martyr	32,267	50.5	+1.0
Labor	Patricia Fowkes	31,588	49.5	−1.0
Liberal gain from Labor		Swing	+1.0	

=== Tangney ===
This section is an excerpt from Electoral results for the Division of Tangney § 1977

1977 Australian federal election: Tangney
Party	Candidate	Votes	%	±%
Liberal	Peter Shack	32,198	48.7	−7.7
Labor	Duncan Graham	21,947	33.2	−6.7
Democrats	Geoffrey Taylor	9,561	14.5	+14.5
Progress	Geoffrey McNeil	2,361	3.6	−0.2
Total formal votes		66,067	96.9	
Informal votes		2,145	3.1	
Turnout		68,212	95.0	
Two-party-preferred result
Liberal	Peter Shack		58.4	−0.2
Labor	Duncan Graham		41.6	+0.2
Liberal hold		Swing	−0.2	

== Tasmania ==
1977 Australian federal election (Tasmania)
← 1975	10 December 1977	1980 →

All 5 Tasmanian seats in the House of Representatives 3 seats needed for a majority
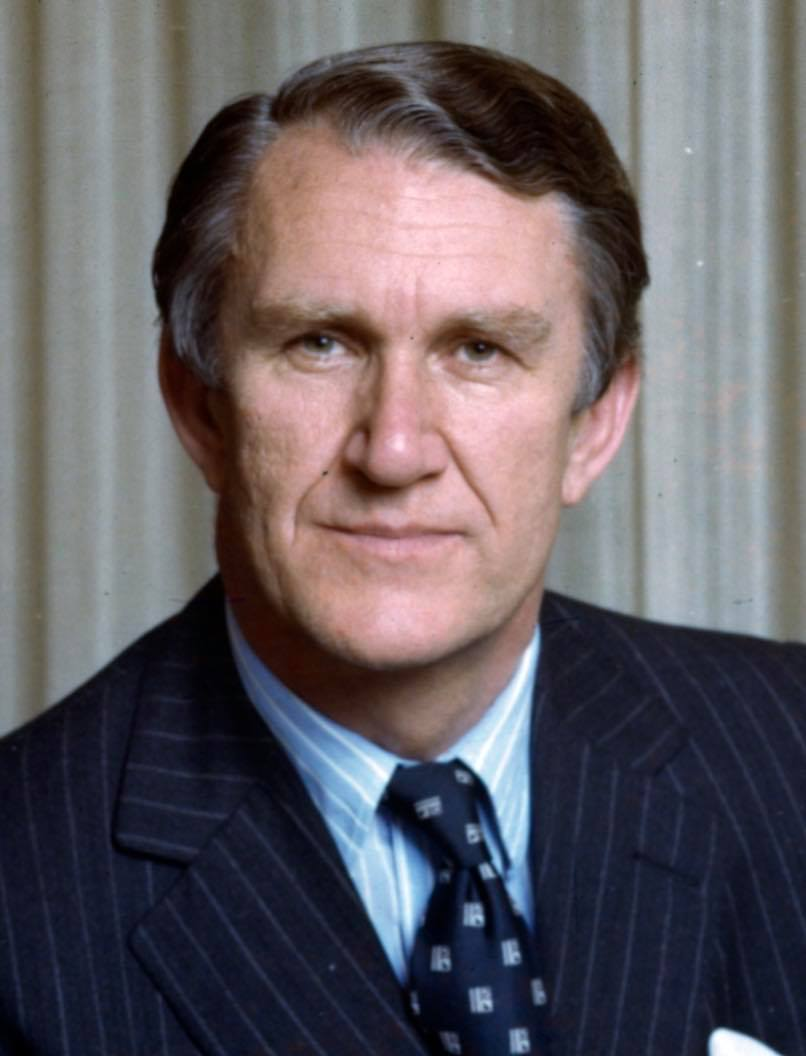

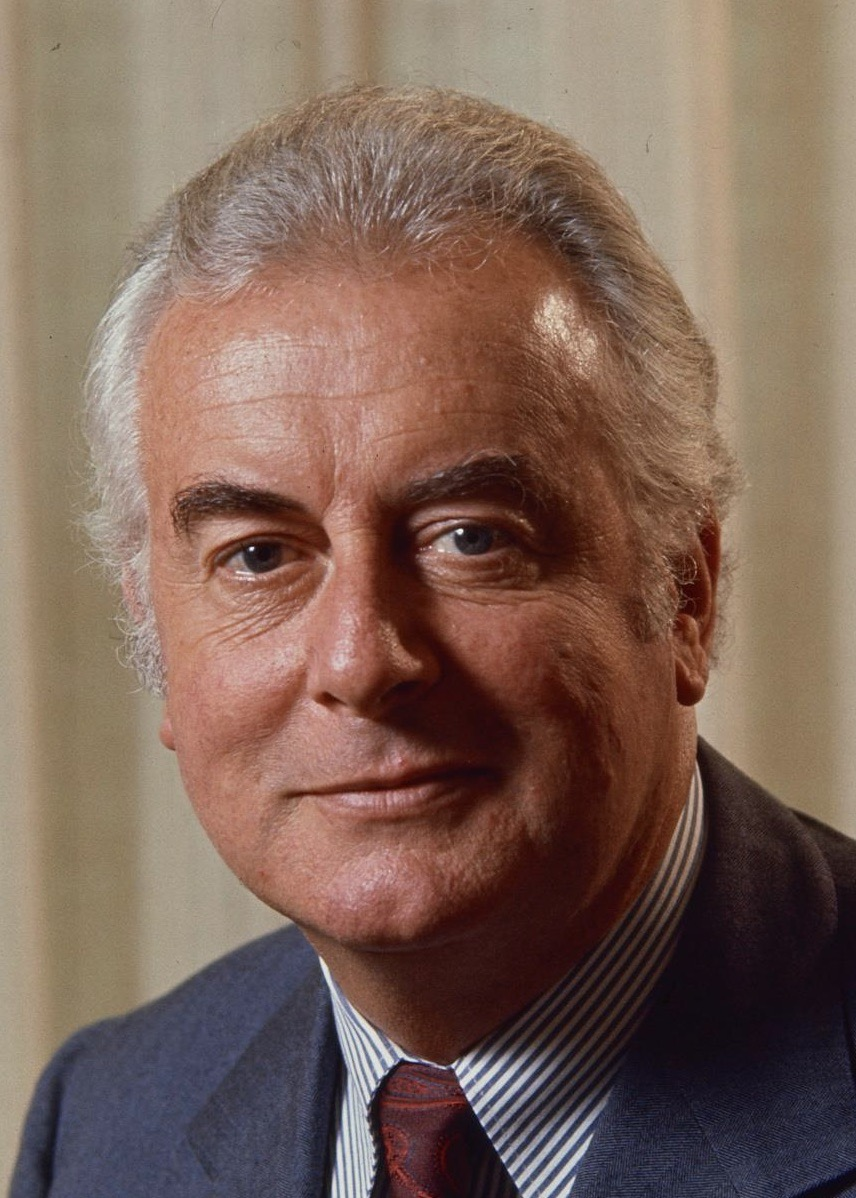
	First party	Second party
Leader	Malcolm Fraser	Gough Whitlam
Party	Coalition	Labor
Seats before	5	0
Seats won	5	0
Seat change	Steady	Steady
Popular vote	134,687	103,877
Percentage	54.6%	42.1%
Swing	▲0.5pp	▼1.4pp
TPP	56.2%	43.8%
TPP swing	▲0.3pp	▼0.3pp

=== Bass ===
This section is an excerpt from Electoral results for the Division of Bass § 1977

1977 Australian federal election: Bass
Party	Candidate	Votes	%	±%
Liberal	Kevin Newman	28,022	55.7	−7.4
Labor	Mary Willey	18,447	36.7	+2.1
Democrats	Dennis Cartledge	3,795	7.6	+7.6
Total formal votes		50,264	97.3	
Informal votes		1,412	2.7	
Turnout		51,676	96.3	
Two-party-preferred result
Liberal	Kevin Newman		60.0	−4.1
Labor	Mary Willey		40.0	+4.1
Liberal hold		Swing	−4.1	

=== Braddon ===
This section is an excerpt from Electoral results for the Division of Braddon § 1977

1977 Australian federal election: Braddon
Party	Candidate	Votes	%	±%
Liberal	Ray Groom	27,384	58.2	+5.3
Labor	Duncan Kerr	19,656	41.8	−3.6
Total formal votes		47,040	96.8	
Informal votes		1,535	3.2	
Turnout		48,575	96.3	
Liberal hold		Swing	+4.4	

=== Denison ===
This section is an excerpt from Electoral results for the Division of Denison § 1977

1977 Australian federal election: Denison
Party	Candidate	Votes	%	±%
Liberal	Michael Hodgman	26,418	50.9	−2.3
Labor	John Coates	23,184	44.7	−0.1
Democrats	Robert McFie	2,303	4.4	+4.4
Total formal votes		51,905	98.0	
Informal votes		1,047	2.0	
Turnout		52,952	96.4	
Two-party-preferred result
Liberal	Michael Hodgman		53.1	−1.7
Labor	John Coates		46.9	+1.7
Liberal hold		Swing	−1.7	

=== Franklin ===
This section is an excerpt from Electoral results for the Division of Franklin § 1977

1977 Australian federal election: Franklin
Party	Candidate	Votes	%	±%
Liberal	Bruce Goodluck	26,797	54.7	+5.3
Labor	Peter Colquhoun	22,175	45.3	−2.4
Total formal votes		48,972	97.6	
Informal votes		1,222	2.4	
Turnout		50,194	97.3	
Liberal hold		Swing	+2.9	

=== Wilmot ===
This section is an excerpt from Electoral results for the Division of Wilmot § 1977

1977 Australian federal election: Wilmot
Party	Candidate	Votes	%	±%
Liberal	Max Burr	26,066	53.6	+1.0
Labor	David Llewellyn	20,415	42.0	−2.2
Democrats	Leon Gourlay	2,157	4.4	+4.4
Total formal votes		48,638	97.3	
Informal votes		1,363	2.7	
Turnout		50,001	97.1	
Two-party-preferred result
Liberal	Max Burr		55.8	+0.5
Labor	David Llewellyn		44.2	−0.5
Liberal hold		Swing	+0.5	

== Australian Capital Territory ==
1977 Australian federal election (Australian Capital Territory)
← 1975	10 December 1977	1980 →

All 2 ACT seats in the House of Representatives 1 seats needed for a majority
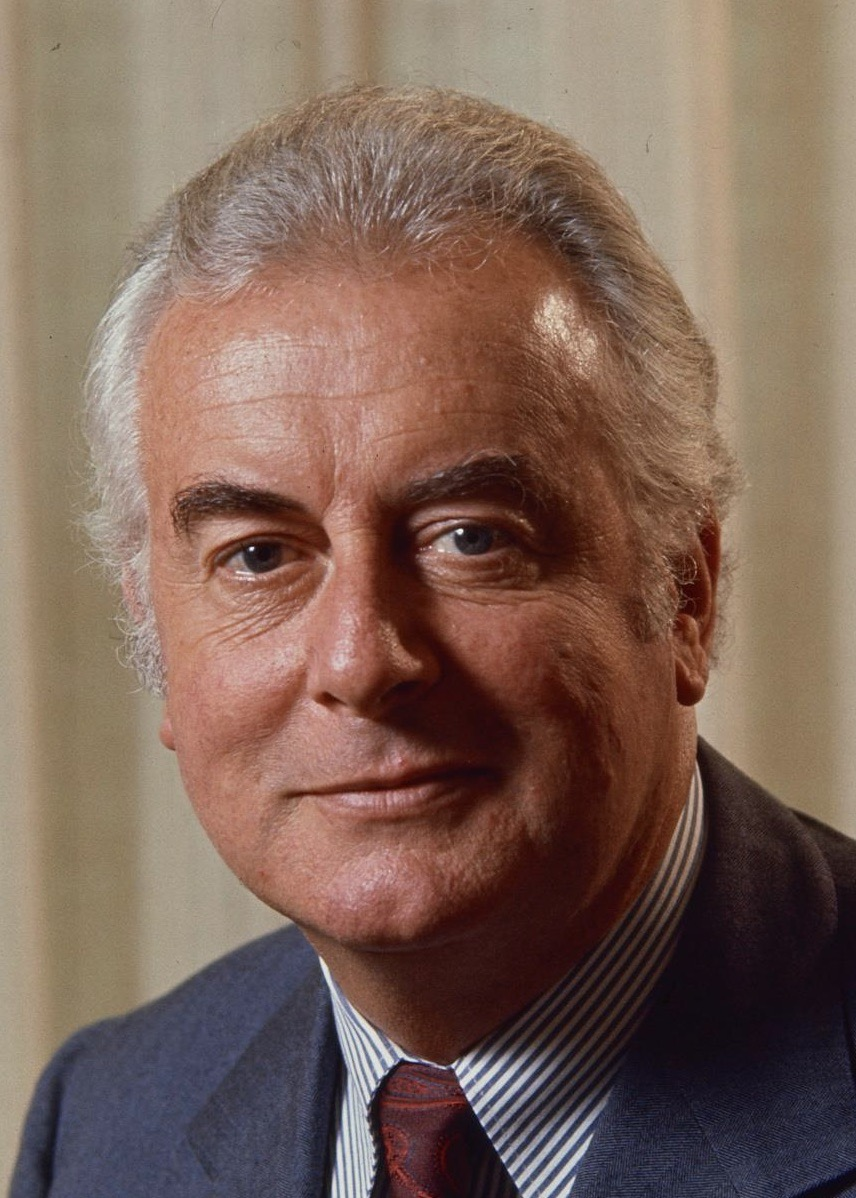

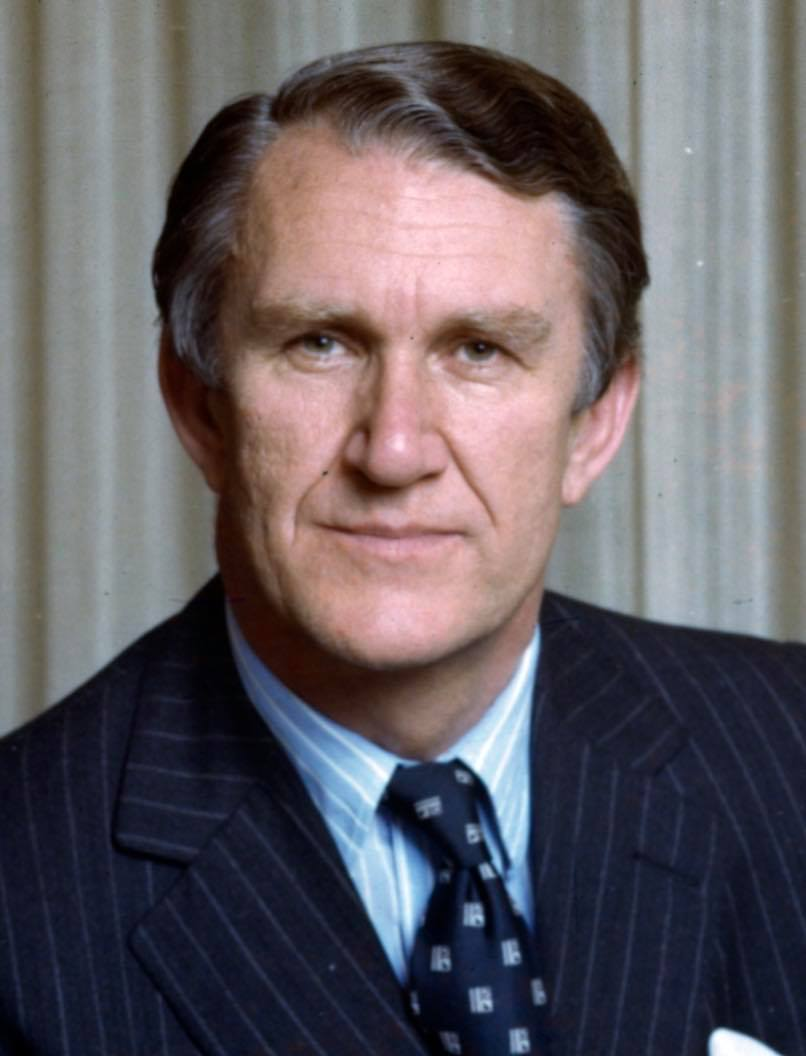
	First party	Second party
Leader	Gough Whitlam	Malcolm Fraser
Party	Labor	Coalition
Seats before	1	1
Seats won	1	1
Seat change	Steady	Steady
Popular vote	57,823	48,190
Percentage	49.04%	40.87%
Swing	▲1.64pp	▼4.63pp
TPP	54.30%	45.70%
TPP swing	▲5.00pp	▼5.00pp

=== Canberra ===
This section is an excerpt from Electoral results for the Division of Canberra § 1977

1977 Australian federal election: Canberra
Party	Candidate	Votes	%	±%
Liberal	John Haslem	24,578	43.2	−6.2
Labor	Henry Lawrence	23,214	40.8	−4.4
Democrats	John Bellhouse	8,544	15.0	+15.0
Independent	Oleg Kavunenko	534	0.9	+0.9
Total formal votes		56,870	97.8	
Informal votes		1,289	2.2	
Turnout		58,159	93.2	
Two-party-preferred result
Liberal	John Haslem	28,976	51.0	−2.3
Labor	Henry Lawrence	27,894	49.0	+2.3
Liberal hold		Swing	−2.3	

=== Fraser ===
This section is an excerpt from Electoral results for the Division of Fraser (Australian Capital Territory) § 1977

1977 Australian federal election: Fraser
Party	Candidate	Votes	%	±%
Labor	Ken Fry	34,609	59.4	+8.3
Liberal	George Mailath	23,612	40.6	−4.7
Total formal votes		58,221	97.5	
Informal votes		1,522	2.5	
Turnout		59,743	92.0	
Labor hold		Swing	+7.4	

== Northern Territory ==
1977 Australian federal election (Northern Territory)
← 1975	10 December 1977	1980 →

Division of Northern Territory
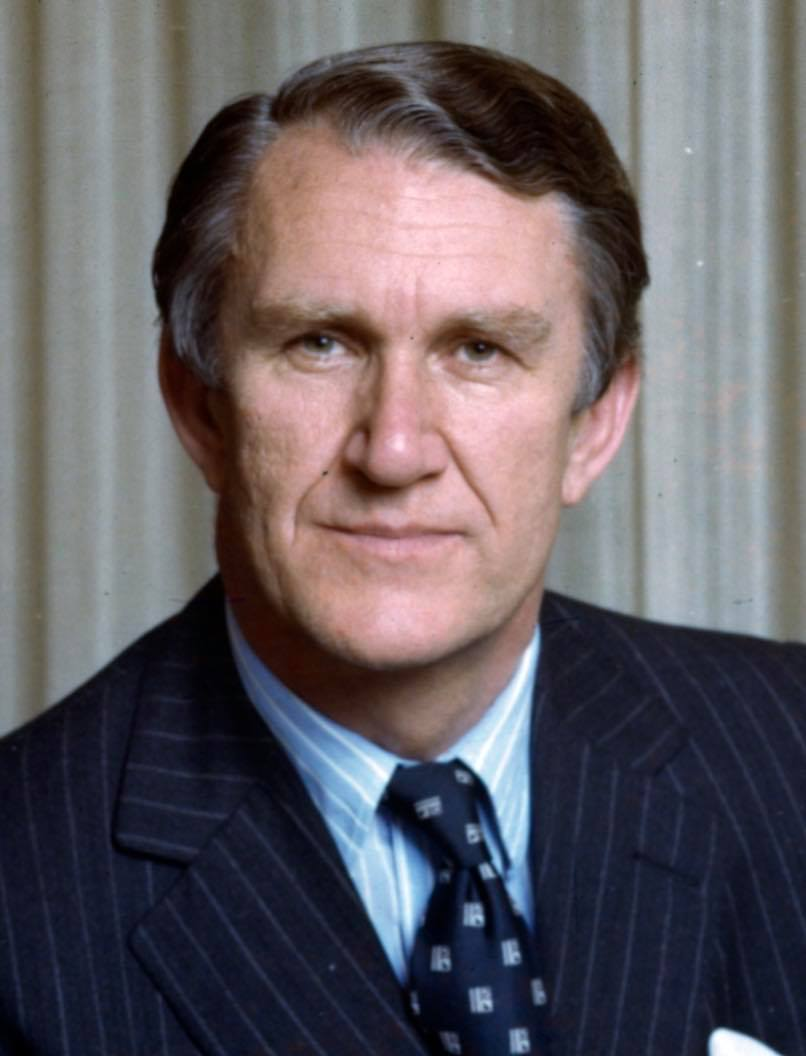

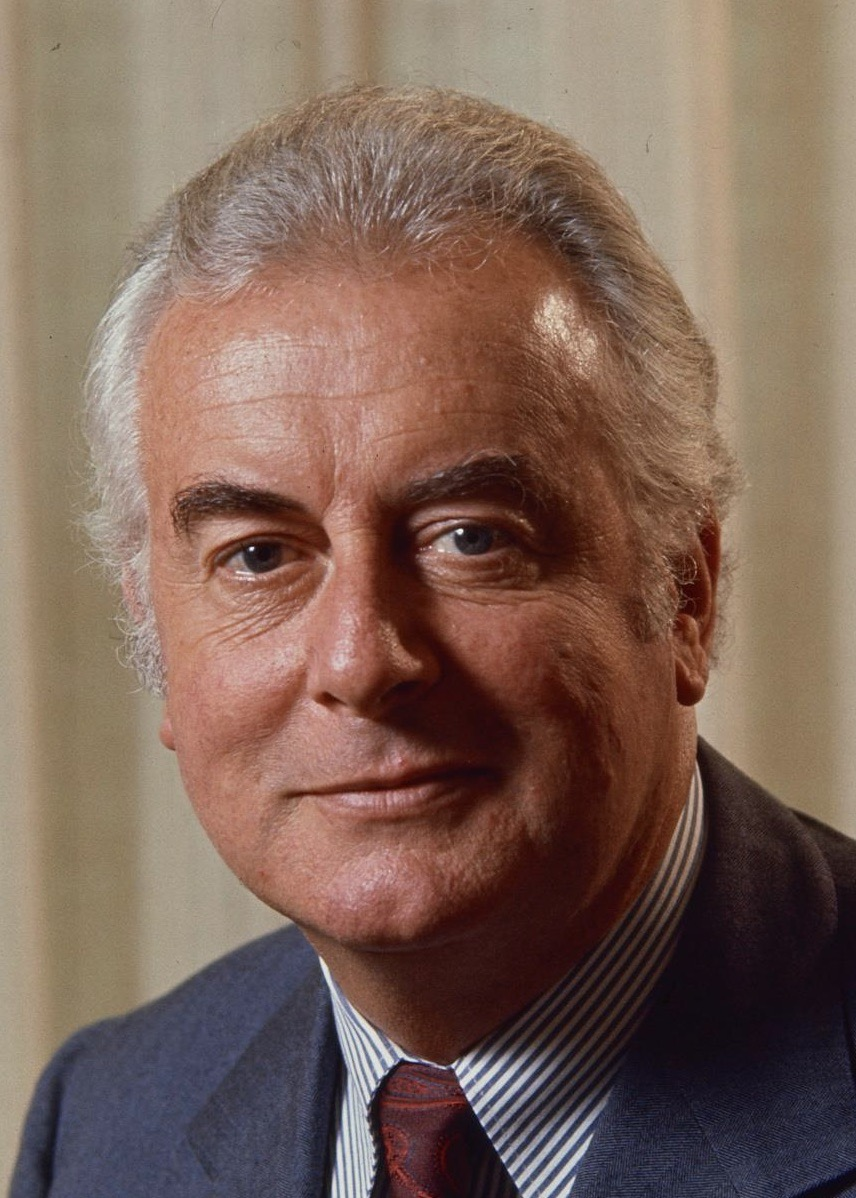
	First party	Second party
Leader	Malcolm Fraser	Gough Whitlam
Party	Coalition	Labor
Seats before	1	0
Seats won	1	0
Seat change	Steady	Steady
Popular vote	16,462	14,811
Percentage	50.0%	42.6%
Swing	▲3.1pp	▼1.1pp
TPP	52.5%	47.5%
TPP swing	▼2.4pp	▲2.4pp

This section is an excerpt from Electoral results for the Division of Northern Territory § 1977

1977 Australian federal election: Northern Territory
Party	Candidate	Votes	%	±%
Country Liberal	Sam Calder	16,462	50.0	+3.1
Labor	John Waters	14,811	42.6	−1.1
Democrats	Josephine Read	2,478	7.1	+7.1
Progress	Ian Smith	987	2.8	+2.8
Total formal votes		34,738	96.5	
Informal votes		1,244	3.5	
Turnout		35,982	81.2	
Two-party-preferred result
Country Liberal	Sam Calder	18,250	52.5	−2.4
Labor	John Waters	16,488	47.5	+2.4
Country Liberal hold		Swing	−2.4	

== See also ==
- Candidates of the 1977 Australian federal election
- Members of the Australian House of Representatives, 1977–1980
