= Peter Johnson (Australian politician) =

Australian politician

Member of the Australian Parliament for Brisbane
- In office 13 December 1975 – 18 October 1980
- Preceded by: Manfred Cross
- Succeeded by: Manfred Cross

Personal details
- Born: 27 September 1943 (age 82) Sydney
- Party: Liberal Party of Australia
- Occupation: Wholesaler

Peter Francis Johnson (born 27 August 1943) was an Australian politician. Born in Sydney, he was a wholesaler and exporter before entering politics. In 1975, he was elected to the Australian House of Representatives as the Liberal member for Brisbane, defeating Labor MP Manfred Cross amid the massive Coalition landslide that year. Johnson was behind in initial counting, but benefited from the National Country Party opting to contest seats outside its traditional rural heartland; he won on the third count when the National Country candidate's preferences flowed overwhelmingly to him. A redistribution ahead of the 1977 election technically made Brisbane a safe Liberal seat, but Johnson narrowly saw off a spirited challenge from Cross that year. Cross defeated him in a subsequent election, in 1980. Johnson went on to become a philosopher writing numerous books on R. G. Collingwood and virtue ethics.

Parliament of Australia
Preceded by Manfred Cross	Member for Brisbane; 1975–1980	Succeeded by Manfred Cross
