= Manfred Cross =

Australian politician (1929–2024)

Manfred Cross AM
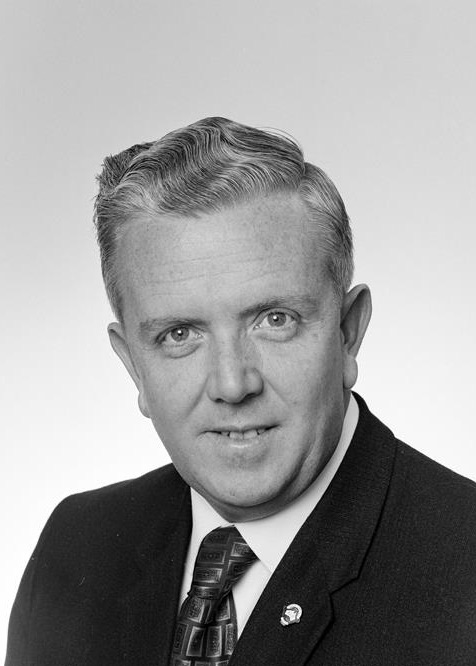

Member of the Australian Parliament for Brisbane
- In office 9 December 1961 – 13 December 1975
- Preceded by: George Lawson
- Succeeded by: Peter Johnson
- In office 18 October 1980 – 19 February 1990
- Preceded by: Peter Johnson
- Succeeded by: Arch Bevis

Personal details
- Born: 12 August 1929 Brisbane, Queensland, Australia
- Died: 30 January 2024 (aged 94)
- Party: Australian Labor Party
- Education: University of Queensland
- Occupation: Public servant

Manfred Douglas Cross AM (12 August 1929 – 30 January 2024) was an Australian public servant and politician. He was educated at various state schools in Brisbane in Queensland before joining the Queensland public service and later, in 1961, becoming a member of the Australian House of Representatives for the Division of Brisbane.

== Early life ==
Born in Brisbane, Cross was the son of Manfred Cross, a telegraphist, and Mary McLennan, a dressmaker. He went to Rainworth State School in Rainworth in the inner Brisbane suburb of Bardon before attending Brisbane State High School. He later studied at the University of Queensland before becoming a Queensland state public servant, joining the Queensland Treasury in 1951.

On 11 July 1969, he married Barbara who, like Manfred, had been active in Labor Party circles in Queensland.

== Parliament and political life ==
In 1961, Cross was elected to the Australian House of Representatives as the Labor member for the federal parliamentary seat of Brisbane. There was a strong nation-wide swing towards Labor in the 1961 federal election and Cross was elected with a comfortable majority in Brisbane of over 57% of the two-party preferred vote. In the same election, his colleague Bill Hayden, later Leader of the Federal Labor Party and Governor-General, unexpectedly won the nearby seat of Oxley in Ipswich.

Cross and Hayden, both Labor Party backbenchers in the Federal parliament throughout most of the 1960s, shared a small room in Parliament House in Canberra (now known as "Old Parliament House") and were well-known members from Queensland in the parliament.

Cross held the seat of Brisbane in the 1963, 1966, and 1969 elections when Labor failed to win government. In 1972, Labor leader Gough Whitlam won the election and the formed the first Labor Government in Australia for 23 years. As a backbencher, Cross had taken a close interest in Aboriginal affairs and had hoped to become Minister for Aboriginal Affairs in the Whitlam Government. However, he narrowly failed to win election to the Ministry and his colleague from Victoria, Gordon Bryant, became Minister for Aboriginal Affairs in the government.

=== 1975 election ===
Cross held the seat of Brisbane until 1975. In the federal election that year he was defeated by Liberal challenger Peter Johnson amid Labor's meltdown in Queensland in the election; Labor was cut down to only one seat in Queensland with Hayden holding on narrowly for Labor in Oxley. Although Cross led Johnson in early voting, he did not win a clear majority on the first count. The seat was decided after the allocation of preferences. In the third round of preferential counting, a National Country candidate's preferences flowed overwhelmingly to Johnson. The National Country Party had begun contesting seats in the Brisbane area in order to broaden its base.

=== Later elections and political life ===
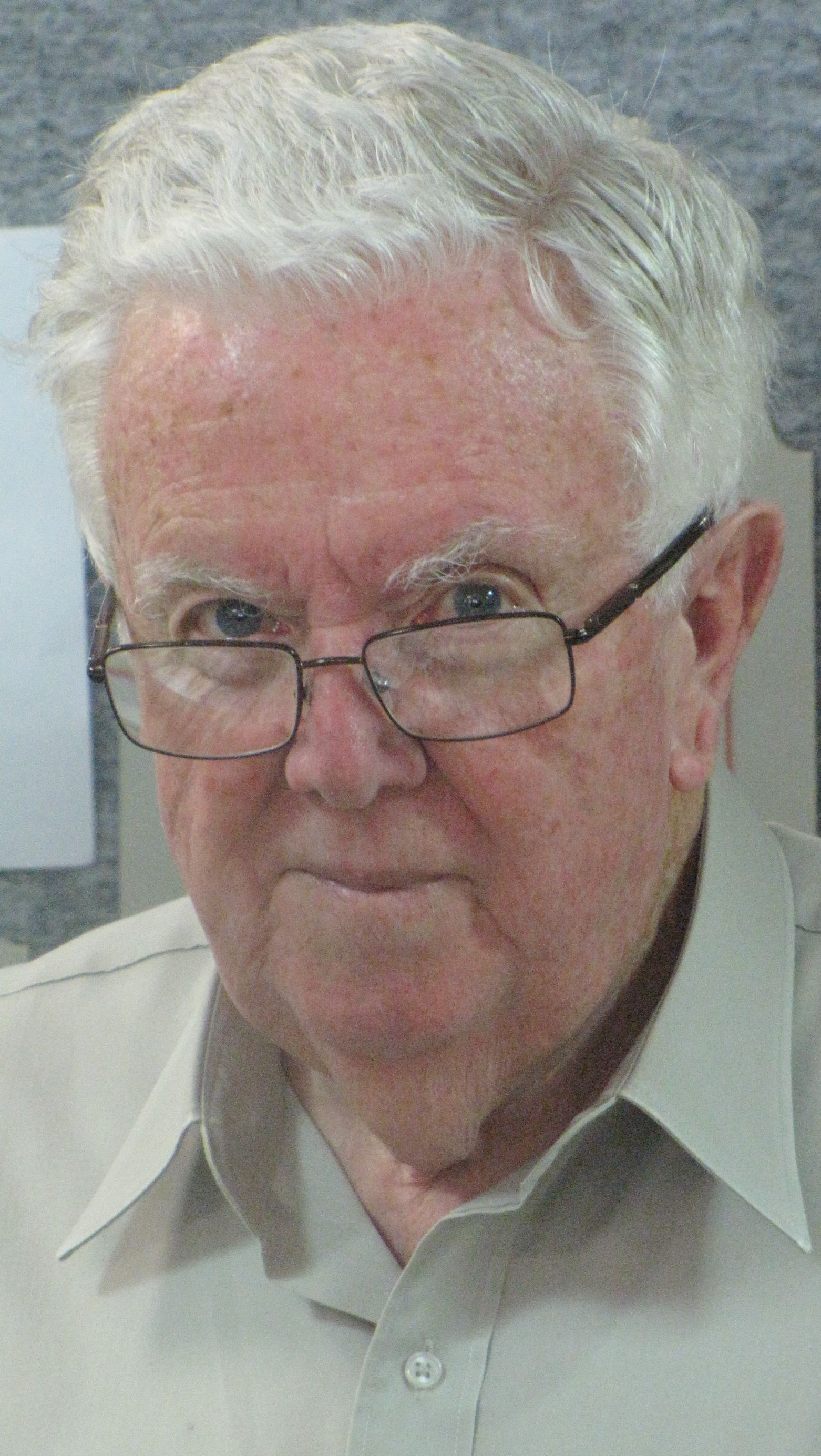
Cross in 2010

During the 1970s and later, Cross was active in efforts to reform the Labor Party in Queensland. Following a severe loss that the Labor Party suffered in the state election in Queensland in 1974, there was growing support for reform of the organisation of the party. Cross, along with colleagues such as Peter Beattie, Di Fingleton, Kev Hooper and Denis Murphy, was one of the activists who supported moves for change. In March 1980 the National Executive of the Labor Party intervened in the management of the party at the state level and appointed Manfred Cross as an interim Queensland Branch Secretary to help guide the reform process.

During this period, Cross continued to work for re-election to the national parliament as the member for Brisbane. He narrowly lost to Peter Johnson in a 1977 rematch but succeeded in regaining the seat in 1980 when there was a nation-wide swing towards Labor with Hayden as leader. Cross remained in the parliament as a member of the House of Representatives until his retirement in 1990.

== Later life ==
From 1989 until 1996, Cross was the Chairman of the Library Board of Queensland.

In January 1992, Cross was awarded an AM in recognition of his service to the Australian Parliament and to the community. He was also awarded the Centenary Medal, for long service as federal member for Brisbane, to local history and to Indigenous rights.

Cross died on 30 January 2024, at the age of 94.

Parliament of Australia
Preceded by George Lawson	Member for Brisbane; 1961–1975	Succeeded by Peter Johnson
Preceded by Peter Johnson	Member for Brisbane; 1980–1990	Succeeded by Arch Bevis
