= Mary Willey =

Australian politician (1941–2022)

Mary Lindsay Caroline Willey (6 May 1941 – 14 February 2022) was an Australian politician.

== Biography ==
She was born in Warrawee, New South Wales, but later moved to Tasmania. At the 1979 state election, she was elected to the Tasmanian House of Assembly as a Labor member for Bass. She resigned from the Labor Party in 1981 in protest at the treatment of deposed Premier Doug Lowe. She contested the 1982 state election as an Independent but was defeated. Willey died on 14 February 2022, at the age of 80.
