= 1980 Australian House of Representatives election =

This is a list of electoral division results for the Australian 1980 federal election.

== Overall ==
This section is an excerpt from 1980 Australian federal election § House of Representatives results

Government (74) Coalition Liberal (54) NCP (19) CLP (1) Opposition (51) Labor (51)

House of Reps (IRV) — 1980–83—Turnout 94.35% (CV) — Informal 2.45%
Party	Votes	%	Swing	Seats	Change
Liberal–NCP coalition	3,853,585	46.40	–1.71	74	–12
Liberal	3,108,517	37.43	−0.66	54	−13
National Country	726,263	8.74	−1.07	19	+1
Country Liberal	18,805	0.23	+0.02	1	0
Labor	3,749,565	45.15	+5.50	51	+13
Democrats	546,032	6.57	−2.81	0	0
Democratic Labor	25,456	0.31	−1.12	0	0
Progress	17,040	0.21	−0.39	0	0
Socialist Workers	16,920	0.20	+0.20	0	0
Communist	11,318	0.14	−0.04	0	0
Socialist Labour	10,051	0.12	+0.12	0	0
NPWA	8,915	0.11	+0.11	0	0
Progressive Conservative	3,620	0.04	+0.04	0	0
United Christian	2,050	0.02	+0.02	0	0
Imperial British Conservative	1,515	0.02	+0.02	0	0
Australia	701	0.01	+0.01	0	0
Marijuana	486	0.01	+0.01	0	0
Independent	58,338	0.70	+0.07	0	0
Total	8,305,633			125	+1
Two-party-preferred (estimated)
Coalition	Win	50.40	−4.20	74	−12
Labor		49.60	+4.20	51	+13

Popular vote
Labor	45.15%
Liberal	37.43%
National	8.97%
Democrats	6.57%
Other	1.88%

Two-party-preferred vote
Coalition	50.40%
Labor	49.60%

Parliament seats
Coalition	59.20%
Labor	40.80%

== New South Wales ==
1980 Australian federal election (New South Wales)
← 1977	18 October 1980	1983 →

All 43 NSW seats in the House of Representatives 22 seats needed for a majority
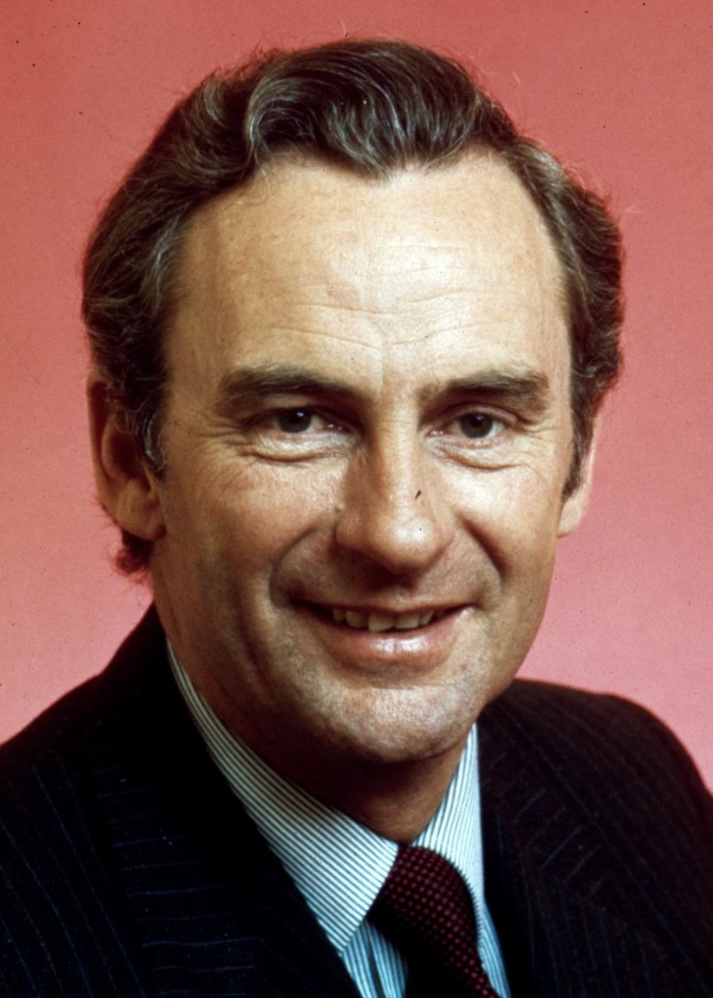

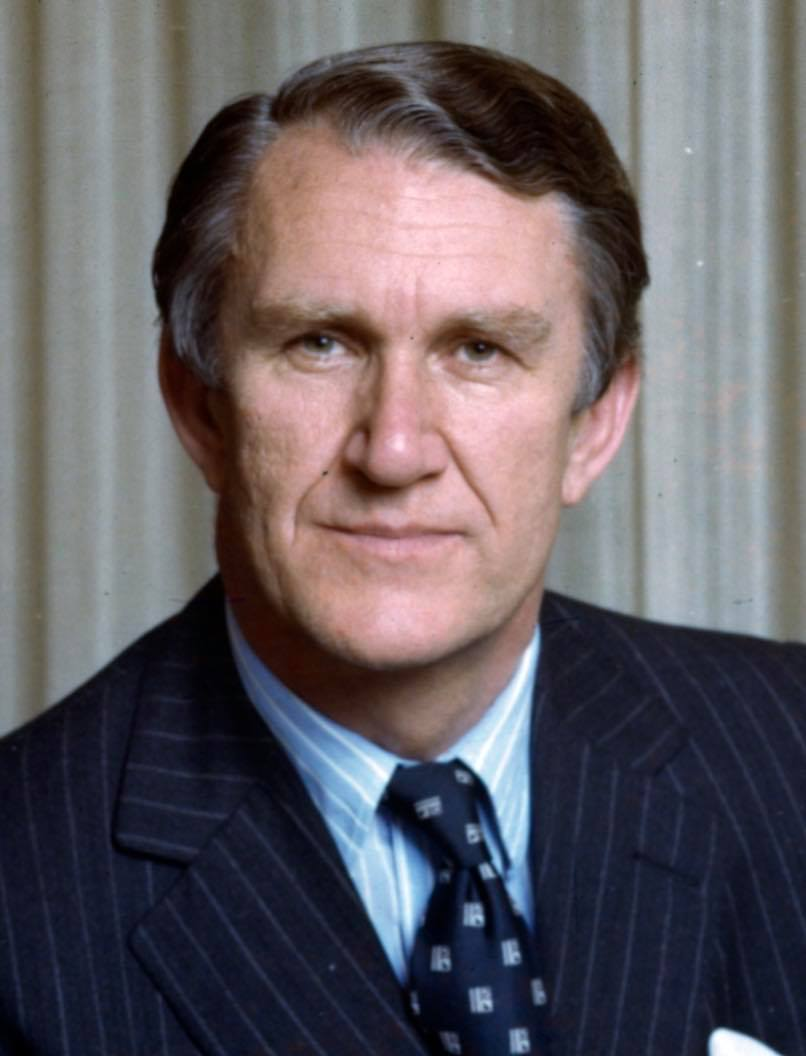
	First party	Second party
Leader	Bill Hayden	Malcolm Fraser
Party	Labor	Coalition
Seats before	17	26
Seats won	18	25
Seat change	▲1	▼1
Popular vote	1,357,556	1,351,591
Percentage	46.4%	46.3%
Swing	▲4.0pp	▼1.2pp
TPP	50.4%	49.6%
TPP swing	▲2.8pp	▼2.8pp

=== Banks ===
This section is an excerpt from Electoral results for the Division of Banks § 1980

1980 Australian federal election: Banks
Party	Candidate	Votes	%	±%
Labor	John Mountford	36,842	53.6	+5.0
Liberal	Donald McConnell	25,316	36.8	−0.9
Democrats	Montague Greene	6,600	9.6	−4.1
Total formal votes		68,768	97.5	−0.1
Informal votes		1,741	2.5	+0.1
Turnout		70,499	95.9	−0.5
Two-party-preferred result
Labor	John Mountford		58.8	+4.6
Liberal	Donald McConnell		41.2	−4.6
Labor hold		Swing	+4.6	

=== Barton ===
This section is an excerpt from Electoral results for the Division of Barton § 1980

1980 Australian federal election: Barton
Party	Candidate	Votes	%	±%
Labor	Rodney Madgwick	30,602	47.1	+6.1
Liberal	Jim Bradfield	30,153	46.4	−2.0
Democrats	Beverley Eley	2,464	3.8	−4.7
Independent	Charles Bellchambers	1,749	2.7	+0.6
Total formal votes		64,967	98.0	
Informal votes		1,299	2.0	
Turnout		66,266	94.9	
Two-party-preferred result
Liberal	Jim Bradfield	32,739	50.4	−3.6
Labor	Rodney Madgwick	32,228	49.6	+3.6
Liberal hold		Swing	−3.6	

=== Bennelong ===
This section is an excerpt from Electoral results for the Division of Bennelong § 1980

1980 Australian federal election: Bennelong
Party	Candidate	Votes	%	±%
Liberal	John Howard	36,075	53.9	−2.3
Labor	John Guthrie	24,262	36.3	+6.3
Democrats	Pamela Tuckwell	4,724	7.1	−5.9
Progress	James Darby	1,856	2.8	+2.0
Total formal votes		66,917	98.1	
Informal votes		1,292	1.9	
Turnout		68,209	94.5	
Two-party-preferred result
Liberal	John Howard		58.4	−5.0
Labor	John Guthrie		41.6	+5.0
Liberal hold		Swing	−5.0	

=== Berowra ===
This section is an excerpt from Electoral results for the Division of Berowra § 1980

1980 Australian federal election: Berowra
Party	Candidate	Votes	%	±%
Liberal	Harry Edwards	39,993	61.4	−1.5
Labor	George Bennett	19,235	29.5	+5.0
Democrats	James Boow	5,939	9.1	−2.4
Total formal votes		65,167	98.2	
Informal votes		1,201	1.8	
Turnout		66,368	94.6	
Two-party-preferred result
Liberal	Harry Edwards		65.0	−4.6
Labor	George Bennett		35.0	+4.6
Liberal hold		Swing	−4.6	

=== Blaxland ===
This section is an excerpt from Electoral results for the Division of Blaxland § 1980

1980 Australian federal election: Blaxland
Party	Candidate	Votes	%	±%
Labor	Paul Keating	38,493	59.6	+5.4
Liberal	Salvatore Napoli	20,024	31.0	−2.0
Socialist Workers	James Doughney	3,203	5.0	+5.0
Democrats	Phillip Grattan	2,103	3.3	−3.5
Socialist Labour	Craig Marley	802	1.2	+1.2
Total formal votes		64,625	96.3	
Informal votes		2,485	3.7	
Turnout		67,110	93.7	
Two-party-preferred result
Labor	Paul Keating		67.2	+5.6
Liberal	Salvatore Napoli		32.8	−5.6
Labor hold		Swing	+5.6	

=== Bradfield ===
This section is an excerpt from Electoral results for the Division of Bradfield § 1980

1980 Australian federal election: Bradfield
Party	Candidate	Votes	%	±%
Liberal	David Connolly	51,354	75.1	+2.5
Labor	Keith McKeen	12,018	17.6	+3.4
Democrats	Ilse Robey	5,018	7.3	−3.6
Total formal votes		68,390	98.5	
Informal votes		1,042	1.5	
Turnout		69,432	94.9	
Two-party-preferred result
Liberal	David Connolly		78.1	−1.6
Labor	Keith McKeen		21.9	+1.6
Liberal hold		Swing	−1.6	

=== Calare ===
This section is an excerpt from Electoral results for the Division of Calare § 1980

1980 Australian federal election: Calare
Party	Candidate	Votes	%	±%
National Country	Sandy Mackenzie	34,234	50.0	+18.4
Labor	David Simmons	31,645	46.3	+5.8
Democrats	Ann Ritter	2,539	3.7	−3.8
Total formal votes		68,418	98.6	
Informal votes		996	1.4	
Turnout		69,414	95.7	
Two-party-preferred result
National Country	Sandy Mackenzie		51.5	−3.7
Labor	David Simmons		48.5	+3.7
National Country hold		Swing	−3.7	

=== Chifley ===
This section is an excerpt from Electoral results for the Division of Chifley § 1980

1980 Australian federal election: Chifley
Party	Candidate	Votes	%	±%
Labor	John Armitage	46,289	65.2	+5.2
Liberal	Philip Daly	19,199	27.0	−1.4
Democrats	Keith Watson	2,539	3.6	−6.2
Socialist Labour	Terence Cook	1,918	2.7	+2.7
Communist	Geoffrey Evans	1,091	1.5	−1.4
Total formal votes		71,036	94.1	
Informal votes		2,848	3.9	
Turnout		73,884	94.7	
Two-party-preferred result
Labor	John Armitage		70.1	+2.6
Liberal	Philip Daly		29.9	−2.6
Labor hold		Swing	+2.6	

=== Cook ===
This section is an excerpt from Electoral results for the Division of Cook § 1980

1980 Australian federal election: Cook
Party	Candidate	Votes	%	±%
Liberal	Don Dobie	36,347	52.1	+0.5
Labor	Ray Thorburn	28,422	40.7	+3.8
Democrats	Alexander Kiss	4,391	6.3	−4.1
Progress	Henry Soper	654	0.9	−0.2
Total formal votes		69,814	98.2	
Informal votes		1,295	1.8	
Turnout		71,109	95.6	
Two-party-preferred result
Liberal	Don Dobie		55.1	−3.2
Labor	Ray Thorburn		44.9	+3.2
Liberal hold		Swing	−3.2	

=== Cowper ===
This section is an excerpt from Electoral results for the Division of Cowper § 1980

1980 Australian federal election: Cowper
Party	Candidate	Votes	%	±%
National Country	Ian Robinson	39,374	54.5	−9.4
Labor	Valma Melville	29,192	40.4	+4.3
Democrats	John Pierce	3,631	5.0	+5.0
Total formal votes		72,197	98.6	
Informal votes		995	1.4	
Turnout		73,192	94.9	
Two-party-preferred result
National Country	Ian Robinson		56.5	−7.4
Labor	Valma Melville		43.5	+7.4
National Country hold		Swing	−7.4	

=== Cunningham ===
This section is an excerpt from Electoral results for the Division of Cunningham § 1980

1980 Australian federal election: Cunningham
Party	Candidate	Votes	%	±%
Labor	Stewart West	40,042	55.9	+2.4
Liberal	Thomas Griffin	21,818	30.5	−0.8
Democrats	Megan Sampson	5,185	7.2	−3.6
Communist	Peter Cockcroft	2,585	3.6	+2.0
Socialist Workers	Andrew Jamieson	1,197	1.7	+1.7
Socialist Labour	Richard Moore	810	1.1	+1.1
Total formal votes		71,637	96.7	
Informal votes		2,476	3.3	
Turnout		74,113	95.1	
Two-party-preferred result
Labor	Stewart West		65.1	+4.4
Liberal	Thomas Griffin		34.9	−4.4
Labor hold		Swing	+4.4	

=== Dundas ===
This section is an excerpt from Electoral results for the Division of Dundas § 1980

1980 Australian federal election: Dundas
Party	Candidate	Votes	%	±%
Liberal	Philip Ruddock	35,836	53.2	−0.6
Labor	Margery Hourihan	25,407	37.7	+3.8
Democrats	Stephen Bastian	4,922	7.3	−2.3
Progress	Archibald Brown	1,243	1.8	−0.9
Total formal votes		67,408	97.8	
Informal votes		1,499	2.2	
Turnout		68,907	94.5	
Two-party-preferred result
Liberal	Philip Ruddock		58.4	−1.7
Labor	Margery Hourihan		41.6	+1.7
Liberal hold		Swing	−1.7	

=== Eden-Monaro ===
This section is an excerpt from Electoral results for the Division of Eden-Monaro § 1980

1980 Australian federal election: Eden-Monaro
Party	Candidate	Votes	%	±%
Liberal	Murray Sainsbury	34,897	49.8	−1.9
Labor	Jim Snow	31,588	45.1	+6.2
Democrats	Norma Helmers	3,586	5.1	−3.5
Total formal votes		70,071	98.7	
Informal votes		906	1.3	
Turnout		70,977	95.2	
Two-party-preferred result
Liberal	Murray Sainsbury	36,987	52.8	−3.1
Labor	Jim Snow	33,084	47.2	+3.1
Liberal hold		Swing	−3.1	

=== Farrer ===
This section is an excerpt from Electoral results for the Division of Farrer § 1980

1980 Australian federal election: Farrer
Party	Candidate	Votes	%	±%
Liberal	Wal Fife	39,670	58.4	−3.5
Labor	Lloyd Elliott	22,856	33.6	+3.7
Democrats	Rodney Dominish	4,613	6.8	+0.7
Progress	Maureen Nathan	808	1.2	+0.2
Total formal votes		67,947	98.4	
Informal votes		1,100	1.6	
Turnout		69,047	95.0	
Two-party-preferred result
Liberal	Wal Fife		61.8	−4.6
Labor	Lloyd Elliott		38.2	+4.6
Liberal hold		Swing	−4.6	

=== Grayndler ===
This section is an excerpt from Electoral results for the Division of Grayndler § 1980

1980 Australian federal election: Grayndler
Party	Candidate	Votes	%	±%
Labor	Leo McLeay	34,029	57.5	−0.2
Liberal	George Dryden	20,538	34.7	+1.3
Democrats	Albert Jarman	1,894	3.2	−4.0
Socialist	Justin Walsh	1,405	2.4	+0.7
Socialist Labour	Derek Mortimer	1,273	2.2	+2.2
Total formal votes		59,139	95.9	
Informal votes		2,513	4.1	
Turnout		61,652	92.6	
Two-party-preferred result
Labor	Leo McLeay		63.5	+1.3
Liberal	Keith Tartak		36.5	−1.3
Labor hold		Swing	+1.3	

=== Gwydir ===
This section is an excerpt from Electoral results for the Division of Gwydir § 1980

1980 Australian federal election: Gwydir
Party	Candidate	Votes	%	±%
National Country	Ralph Hunt	38,796	58.4	−0.6
Labor	Robert Hamilton	23,589	35.5	+2.8
Democrats	Gloria Collison	4,004	6.0	+1.5
Total formal votes		66,389	98.5	
Informal votes		1,041	1.5	
Turnout		67,430	94.3	
Two-party-preferred result
National Country	Ralph Hunt		60.4	−2.9
Labor	Robert Hamilton		39.6	+2.9
National Country hold		Swing	−2.9	

=== Hughes ===
This section is an excerpt from Electoral results for the Division of Hughes § 1980

1980 Australian federal election: Hughes
Party	Candidate	Votes	%	±%
Labor	Les Johnson	40,470	57.0	+5.3
Liberal	Chris Downy	23,951	33.7	+0.6
Democrats	Questa Gill	5,867	8.3	−6.9
Progress	Marjorie Wisby	687	1.0	+1.0
Total formal votes		70,975	97.9	
Informal votes		1,517	2.1	
Turnout		72,492	95.8	
Two-party-preferred result
Labor	Les Johnson		62.1	+2.8
Liberal	Chris Downy		37.9	−2.8
Labor hold		Swing	+2.8	

=== Hume ===
This section is an excerpt from Electoral results for the Division of Hume § 1980

1980 Australian federal election: Hume
Party	Candidate	Votes	%	±%
National Country	Stephen Lusher	37,013	56.0	−1.0
Labor	Sue West	27,614	41.8	+3.4
Democrats	Gwendoline Wilson	1,478	2.2	−2.3
Total formal votes		66,105	98.8	
Informal votes		832	1.2	
Turnout		66,937	95.3	
Two-party-preferred result
National Country	Stephen Lusher		56.9	−2.4
Labor	Sue West		43.1	+2.4
National Country hold		Swing	−2.4	

=== Hunter ===
This section is an excerpt from Electoral results for the Division of Hunter § 1980

1980 Australian federal election: Hunter
Party	Candidate	Votes	%	±%
Labor	Bob Brown	51,061	67.9	+7.2
Liberal	Ashley Saunders	19,896	26.5	−1.3
Democrats	Edwina Wilson	4,227	5.6	−5.9
Total formal votes		75,184	98.1	
Informal votes		1,454	1.9	
Turnout		76,638	95.7	
Two-party-preferred result
Labor	Bob Brown		71.3	+4.8
Liberal	Ashley Saunders		28.7	−4.8
Labor hold		Swing	+4.8	

=== Kingsford Smith ===
This section is an excerpt from Electoral results for the Division of Kingsford Smith § 1980

1980 Australian federal election: Kingsford-Smith
Party	Candidate	Votes	%	±%
Labor	Lionel Bowen	44,083	69.5	+5.1
Liberal	Collin O'Neill	17,148	27.0	−2.6
Democrats	Oliver Nekula	2,167	3.4	−2.7
Total formal votes		63,398	96.6	
Informal votes		2,262	3.4	
Turnout		65,660	92.6	
Two-party-preferred result
Labor	Lionel Bowen		71.5	+4.0
Liberal	Collin O'Neill		28.5	−4.0
Labor hold		Swing	+4.0	

=== Lowe ===
This section is an excerpt from Electoral results for the Division of Lowe § 1980

1980 Australian federal election: Lowe
Party	Candidate	Votes	%	±%
Liberal	Sir William McMahon	31,892	48.7	−4.1
Labor	Jan Burnswoods	30,379	46.4	+7.2
Democrats	Bradley Mulligan	1,987	3.0	−2.7
Independent	Anthony Reasha	1,167	1.8	+1.8
Total formal votes		65,425	97.1	
Informal votes		1,957	2.9	
Turnout		67,382	92.7	
Two-party-preferred result
Liberal	Sir William McMahon	33,416	51.1	−5.2
Labor	Jan Burnswoods	32,009	48.9	+5.2
Liberal hold		Swing	−5.2	

=== Lyne ===
This section is an excerpt from Electoral results for the Division of Lyne § 1980

1980 Australian federal election: Lyne
Party	Candidate	Votes	%	±%
Labor	Leslie Brown	27,714	37.7	+3.7
National Country	Bruce Cowan	23,413	31.8	−24.0
Liberal	Milton Morris	20,636	28.1	+28.1
Democrats	Edwin Poppleton	1,792	2.4	−7.8
Total formal votes		73,555	98.6	
Informal votes		1,021	1.4	
Turnout		74,576	96.1	
Two-party-preferred result
National Country	Bruce Cowan	43,350	58.9	−2.5
Labor	Leslie Brown	30,205	41.1	+2.5
National Country hold		Swing	−2.5	

=== Macarthur ===
This section is an excerpt from Electoral results for the Division of Macarthur § 1980

1980 Australian federal election: Macarthur
Party	Candidate	Votes	%	±%
Liberal	Michael Baume	37,786	51.2	+2.8
Labor	Jim Groves	32,417	44.0	−0.6
Democrats	Warren Steele	3,081	4.2	−1.9
Independent	Ronald Sarina	470	0.6	+0.6
Total formal votes		73,754	98.2	
Informal votes		1,317	1.8	
Turnout		75,071	94.9	
Two-party-preferred result
Liberal	Michael Baume		53.2	+1.3
Labor	Jim Groves		46.8	−1.3
Liberal hold		Swing	+1.3	

=== Mackellar ===
This section is an excerpt from Electoral results for the Division of Mackellar § 1980

1980 Australian federal election: Mackellar
Party	Candidate	Votes	%	±%
Liberal	Jim Carlton	38,922	60.2	+4.8
Labor	Kevin Mason	20,513	31.7	+3.5
Democrats	Robert Williams	5,222	8.1	−3.1
Total formal votes		64,657	97.3	
Informal votes		1,785	2.7	
Turnout		66,442	93.5	
Two-party-preferred result
Liberal	Jim Carlton		63.5	−0.8
Labor	Kevin Mason		36.5	+0.8
Liberal hold		Swing	−0.8	

=== Macquarie ===
This section is an excerpt from Electoral results for the Division of Macquarie § 1980

1980 Australian federal election: Macquarie
Party	Candidate	Votes	%	±%
Labor	Ross Free	36,814	46.7	+7.3
Liberal	Reg Gillard	34,699	44.0	+2.2
Democrats	Richard Jackson-Hope	4,603	5.8	−5.0
Independent	Raymond Butcher	1,958	2.5	+2.5
Independent	Ronald Stanton	447	0.6	+0.6
Independent	Ian Perry	377	0.5	+0.5
Total formal votes		78,898	97.3	
Informal votes		2,194	2.7	
Turnout		81,092	94.5	
Two-party-preferred result
Labor	Ross Free	41,687	52.8	+4.5
Liberal	Reg Gillard	37,211	47.2	−4.5
Labor gain from Liberal		Swing	+4.5	

=== Mitchell ===
This section is an excerpt from Electoral results for the Division of Mitchell § 1980

1980 Australian federal election: Mitchell
Party	Candidate	Votes	%	±%
Liberal	Alan Cadman	48,860	63.2	+2.8
Labor	Patrick McArdle	23,703	30.7	+3.6
Democrats	Rosemary Mason	4,744	6.1	−3.1
Total formal votes		77,307	98.0	
Informal votes		1,603	2.0	
Turnout		78,910	94.6	
Two-party-preferred result
Liberal	Alan Cadman		65.6	−1.6
Labor	Patrick McArdle		34.4	+1.6
Liberal hold		Swing	−1.6	

=== New England ===
This section is an excerpt from Electoral results for the Division of New England § 1980

1980 Australian federal election: New England
Party	Candidate	Votes	%	±%
National Country	Ian Sinclair	34,454	52.7	−6.6
Labor	Selby Dean	24,808	37.9	+6.5
Democrats	Fiona Richardson	6,124	9.4	+0.1
Total formal votes		65,386	98.4	
Informal votes		1,050	1.6	
Turnout		66,436	95.2	
Two-party-preferred result
National Country	Ian Sinclair		56.5	−7.5
Labor	Selby Dean		43.5	+7.5
National Country hold		Swing	−7.5	

=== Newcastle ===
This section is an excerpt from Electoral results for the Division of Newcastle1980

1980 Australian federal election: Newcastle
Party	Candidate	Votes	%	±%
Labor	Charles Jones	38,321	58.0	+0.7
Liberal	Richard Bevan	22,823	34.5	+1.1
Democrats	John Cleverly	2,132	3.2	−2.1
Communist	Darrell Dawson	1,629	2.5	−1.6
Socialist Workers	Geoffrey Payne	1,204	1.8	+1.8
Total formal votes		66,109	97.8	
Informal votes		1,504	2.2	
Turnout		67,613	94.9	
Two-party-preferred result
Labor	Charles Jones		63.8	+0.1
Liberal	Richard Bevan		36.2	−0.1
Labor hold		Swing	+0.1	

=== North Sydney ===
This section is an excerpt from Electoral results for the Division of North Sydney § 1980

1980 Australian federal election: North Sydney
Party	Candidate	Votes	%	±%
Liberal	John Spender	37,016	60.0	+1.4
Labor	Maxine Broughton	19,223	31.2	+5.0
Democrats	Anita Stiller	3,573	5.8	−5.2
Progress	Peter Corrie	1,131	1.8	−0.8
Independent	Josephine Chisholm-Mallett	737	1.2	+1.2
Total formal votes		61,680	97.8	
Informal votes		1,410	2.2	
Turnout		63,090	90.0	
Two-party-preferred result
Liberal	John Spender		64.5	−2.8
Labor	Maxine Broughton		35.5	+2.8
Liberal hold		Swing	−2.8	

=== Parramatta ===
This section is an excerpt from Electoral results for the Division of Parramatta § 1980

1980 Australian federal election: Parramatta
Party	Candidate	Votes	%	±%
Labor	John Brown	35,810	54.0	+2.0
Liberal	Lance Shaw	23,058	34.8	−5.0
Democrats	Warwick Barber	6,191	9.3	+1.1
Independent	Jim Saleam	1,248	1.9	+1.9
Total formal votes		66,307	96.5	
Informal votes		2,410	3.5	
Turnout		68,717	94.2	
Two-party-preferred result
Labor	John Brown		60.2	+4.1
Liberal	Lance Shaw		39.8	−4.1
Labor hold		Swing	+4.1	

=== Paterson ===
This section is an excerpt from Electoral results for the Division of Paterson § 1980

1980 Australian federal election: Paterson
Party	Candidate	Votes	%	±%
National Country	Frank O'Keefe	36,416	55.1	−2.5
Labor	Francis Murray	24,946	37.7	+3.4
Democrats	Denis Driver	4,265	6.4	−0.3
Independent	William Reeve-Parker	516	0.8	+0.8
Total formal votes		66,143	98.3	
Informal votes		1,124	1.7	
Turnout		67,267	95.3	
Two-party-preferred result
National Country	Frank O'Keefe		57.7	−4.5
Labor	Francis Murray		42.3	+4.5
National Country hold		Swing	−4.5	

=== Phillip ===
This section is an excerpt from Electoral results for the Division of Phillip § 1980

1980 Australian federal election: Phillip
Party	Candidate	Votes	%	±%
Liberal	Jack Birney	29,541	48.7	+0.7
Labor	Jeannette McHugh	27,904	46.0	+2.0
Democrats	Leslie Reiss	2,781	4.6	−2.5
Independent	Russell Deiley	474	0.8	+0.8
Total formal votes		60,700	97.5	
Informal votes		1,579	2.5	
Turnout		62,279	89.9	
Two-party-preferred result
Liberal	Jack Birney	30,744	50.6	−1.4
Labor	Jeannette McHugh	29,956	49.4	+1.4
Liberal hold		Swing	−1.4	

=== Prospect ===
This section is an excerpt from Electoral results for the Division of Prospect § 1980

1980 Australian federal election: Prospect
Party	Candidate	Votes	%	±%
Labor	Dick Klugman	39,419	57.9	+3.3
Liberal	Alan Byers	24,967	36.6	+3.3
Democrats	Robert Goodere	3,751	5.5	−6.1
Total formal votes		68,137	95.5	
Informal votes		3,227	4.5	
Turnout		71,364	93.3	
Two-party-preferred result
Labor	Dick Klugman		61.2	+1.3
Liberal	Alan Byers		38.8	−1.3
Labor hold		Swing	+1.3	

=== Reid ===
This section is an excerpt from Electoral results for the Division of Reid § 1980

1980 Australian federal election: Reid
Party	Candidate	Votes	%	±%
Labor	Tom Uren	38,675	61.6	+3.1
Liberal	Yvonne Maio	18,885	30.1	−2.0
Independent	Neville Gray	3,664	5.8	+5.8
Democrats	Paul Terrett	1,548	2.5	−6.9
Total formal votes		62,772	96.5	
Informal votes		2,300	3.5	
Turnout		65,072	94.0	
Two-party-preferred result
Labor	Tom Uren		65.5	+2.8
Liberal	Yvonne Maio		34.5	−2.8
Labor hold		Swing	+2.8	

=== Richmond ===
This section is an excerpt from Electoral results for the Division of Richmond § 1980

1980 Australian federal election: Richmond
Party	Candidate	Votes	%	±%
National Country	Doug Anthony	42,037	56.9	−4.5
Labor	Terence McGee	26,574	36.0	+4.2
Democrats	Ashley Albanese	5,216	7.1	+1.7
Total formal votes		73,827	98.8	
Informal votes		906	1.2	
Turnout		74,733	94.6	
Two-party-preferred result
National Country	Doug Anthony		60.3	−4.5
Labor	Terence McGee		39.7	+4.5
National Country hold		Swing	−4.5	

=== Riverina ===
This section is an excerpt from Electoral results for the Division of Riverina § 1980

1980 Australian federal election: Riverina
Party	Candidate	Votes	%	±%
Labor	Frederick Smith	30,698	46.9	−1.9
National Country	Noel Hicks	21,663	33.1	−15.6
Liberal	Brian Thornton	11,072	16.9	+16.9
Democrats	John Newman	1,414	2.2	+2.2
Independent	Frederick Martin	549	0.8	+0.8
Total formal votes		65,396	97.6	
Informal votes		1,628	2.4	
Turnout		67,024	93.2	
Two-party-preferred result
National Country	Noel Hicks	33,055	50.5	+0.6
Labor	Frederick Smith	32,345	49.5	−0.6
National Country gain from Labor		Swing	+0.6	

=== Robertson ===
This section is an excerpt from Electoral results for the Division of Robertson § 1980

1980 Australian federal election: Robertson
Party	Candidate	Votes	%	±%
Labor	Barry Cohen	41,569	52.4	+5.7
Liberal	Brian Gill	30,390	38.3	−4.8
Democrats	Trevor Willsher	4,629	5.8	−4.4
Independent	Paul Baker	2,696	3.4	+3.4
Total formal votes		79,284	98.1	
Informal votes		1,501	1.9	
Turnout		80,785	94.9	
Two-party-preferred result
Labor	Barry Cohen		58.1	+5.8
Liberal	Brian Gill		41.9	−5.8
Labor hold		Swing	+5.8	

=== Shortland ===
This section is an excerpt from Electoral results for the Division of Shortland § 1980

1980 Australian federal election: Shortland
Party	Candidate	Votes	%	±%
Labor	Peter Morris	45,509	61.0	+6.5
Liberal	Eddie Namir	20,611	27.6	−7.6
Democrats	Lionel Lambkin	5,111	6.8	−3.5
Socialist Labour	Robert Buhler	3,422	4.6	+4.6
Total formal votes		74,653	98.0	
Informal votes		1,497	2.0	
Turnout		76,150	96.0	
Two-party-preferred result
Labor	Peter Morris		69.3	+9.6
Liberal	Eddie Namir		30.7	−9.6
Labor hold		Swing	+9.6	

=== St George ===
This section is an excerpt from Electoral results for the Division of St George § 1980

1980 Australian federal election: St George
Party	Candidate	Votes	%	±%
Labor	Bill Morrison	34,855	53.4	+8.3
Liberal	Maurice Neil	27,946	42.8	−5.1
Democrats	Beverley Davis	2,509	3.8	−2.5
Total formal votes		65,310	97.5	
Informal votes		1,680	2.5	
Turnout		66,990	94.8	
Two-party-preferred result
Labor	Bill Morrison		56.1	+8.1
Liberal	Maurice Neil		43.9	−8.1
Labor gain from Liberal		Swing	+8.1	

=== Sydney ===
This section is an excerpt from Electoral results for the Division of Sydney § 1980

1980 Australian federal election: Sydney
Party	Candidate	Votes	%	±%
Labor	Les McMahon	36,720	62.0	−1.2
Liberal	Cliff Reece	13,364	22.6	−0.1
Democrats	Maxwell Adams	4,816	8.1	+2.6
Communist	Judy Mundey	2,850	4.8	−1.5
Socialist Workers	Juanita Keig	1,477	2.5	+2.5
Total formal votes		59,227	95.9	
Informal votes		2,545	4.1	
Turnout		61,772	88.6	
Two-party-preferred result
Labor	Les McMahon		73.8	+0.4
Liberal	Cliff Reece		26.2	−0.4
Labor hold		Swing	+0.4	

=== Warringah ===
This section is an excerpt from Electoral results for the Division of Warringah § 1980

1980 Australian federal election: Warringah
Party	Candidate	Votes	%	±%
Liberal	Michael MacKellar	39,270	62.5	−0.4
Labor	Desmond Murphy	17,864	28.4	+3.7
Democrats	Arthur Bishop	3,944	6.3	−3.5
Progressive Conservative	John McGrath	1,297	2.1	+2.1
Progress	David Rennie	490	0.8	−1.8
Total formal votes		62,865	98.5	
Informal votes		1,593	2.5	
Turnout		64,458	93.6	
Two-party-preferred result
Liberal	Michael MacKellar		67.4	−2.8
Labor	Desmond Murphy		32.6	+2.8
Liberal hold		Swing	−2.8	

=== Wentworth ===
This section is an excerpt from Electoral results for the Division of Wentworth § 1980

1980 Australian federal election: Wentworth
Party	Candidate	Votes	%	±%
Liberal	Bob Ellicott	36,426	60.5	+3.0
Labor	Stephen McGoldrick	20,086	33.3	+1.9
Democrats	Joan Kersey	3,746	6.2	−1.9
Total formal votes		60,258	97.5	
Informal votes		1,540	2.5	
Turnout		61,798	88.5	
Two-party-preferred result
Liberal	Bob Ellicott		63.0	−1.4
Labor	Stephen McGoldrick		37.0	+1.4
Liberal hold		Swing	−1.4	

=== Werriwa ===
This section is an excerpt from Electoral results for the Division of Werriwa § 1980

1980 Australian federal election: Werriwa
Party	Candidate	Votes	%	±%
Labor	John Kerin	45,296	57.9	+2.4
Liberal	Marie Rutledge	23,813	30.4	−3.5
Democrats	Keith Olson	5,074	6.5	−2.5
Independent	Edward Bell	4,079	5.2	+5.2
Total formal votes		78,262	96.8	
Informal votes		2,577	3.2	
Turnout		80,839	95.0	
Two-party-preferred result
Labor	John Kerin		66.6	+6.4
Liberal	Marie Rutledge		33.4	−6.4
Labor hold		Swing	+6.4	

== Victoria ==
1980 Australian federal election (Victoria)
← 1977	18 October 1980	1983 →

All 33 Victorian seats in the House of Representatives 17 seats needed for a majority
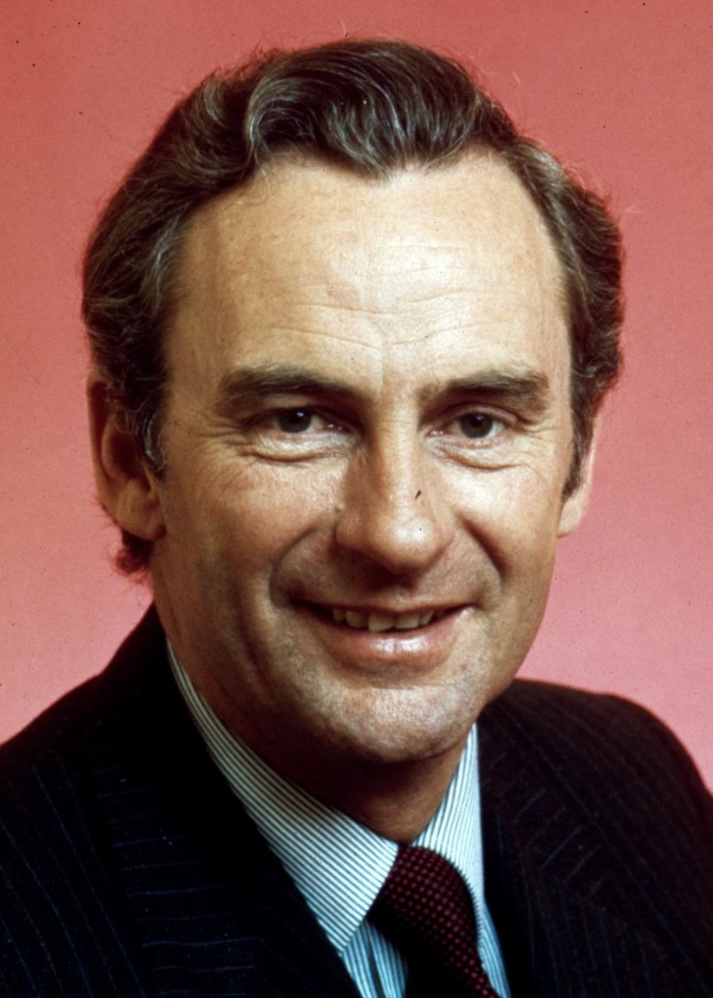

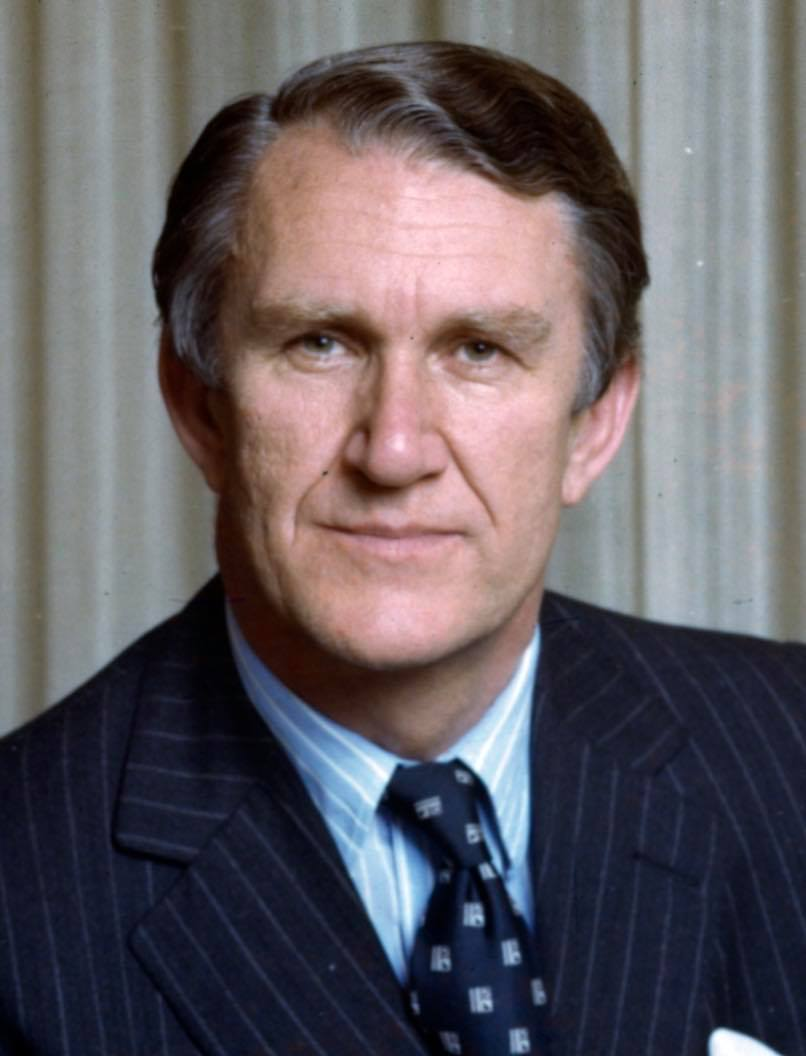
	First party	Second party
Leader	Bill Hayden	Malcolm Fraser
Party	Labor	Coalition
Seats before	10	23
Seats won	17	16
Seat change	▲7	▼7
Popular vote	1,016,617	983,901
Percentage	45.5%	44.0%
Swing	▲8.3pp	▼1.2pp
TPP	50.7%	49.3%
TPP swing	▲6.2pp	▼6.2pp

=== Balaclava ===
This section is an excerpt from Electoral results for the Division of Balaclava § 1980

1980 Australian federal election: Balaclava
Party	Candidate	Votes	%	±%
Liberal	Ian Macphee	32,729	51.6	+1.0
Labor	Chris Kennedy	22,933	36.2	+7.2
Democrats	Zelma Furey	7,743	12.2	−3.2
Total formal votes		63,405	97.8	
Informal votes		1,444	2.2	
Turnout		64,849	93.8	
Two-party-preferred result
Liberal	Ian Macphee		56.1	−7.2
Labor	Chris Kennedy		43.9	+7.2
Liberal hold		Swing	−7.2	

=== Ballarat ===
This section is an excerpt from Electoral results for the Division of Ballarat § 1980

1980 Australian federal election: Ballarat
Party	Candidate	Votes	%	±%
Liberal	Jim Short	30,551	46.0	−2.0
Labor	John Mildren	29,990	45.2	+8.2
Democrats	Graham Gough	3,736	5.6	−4.3
Democratic Labor	John Cotter	2,099	3.2	−1.8
Total formal votes		66,376	98.9	
Informal votes		1,239	1.8	
Turnout		67,615	96.7	
Two-party-preferred result
Labor	John Mildren	33,623	50.7	+8.2
Liberal	Jim Short	32,753	49.3	−8.2
Labor gain from Liberal		Swing	+8.2	

=== Batman ===
This section is an excerpt from Electoral results for the Division of Batman § 1980

1980 Australian federal election: Batman
Party	Candidate	Votes	%	±%
Labor	Brian Howe	37,065	55.5	+8.2
Liberal	Rosemary Kemp	20,785	31.1	−6.3
Democratic Labor	Allen Doyle	4,945	7.4	+2.1
Democrats	Jeffrey McAlpine	4,002	6.0	−4.0
Total formal votes		66,797	97.1	
Informal votes		2,004	2.9	
Turnout		68,801	94.3	
Two-party-preferred result
Labor	Brian Howe		60.7	+7.3
Liberal	Rosemary Kemp		39.3	−7.3
Labor hold		Swing	+7.3	

=== Bendigo ===
This section is an excerpt from Electoral results for the Division of Bendigo § 1980

1980 Australian federal election: Bendigo
Party	Candidate	Votes	%	±%
Liberal	John Bourchier	31,468	47.3	−0.7
Labor	Victor Dolby	29,257	44.0	+9.5
Democrats	George Hunter	5,828	8.8	−3.8
Total formal votes		66,553	98.6	
Informal votes		919	1.4	
Turnout		67,472	96.1	
Two-party-preferred result
Liberal	John Bourchier	34,122	51.3	−6.9
Labor	Victor Dolby	32,431	48.7	+6.9
Liberal hold		Swing	−6.9	

=== Bruce ===
This section is an excerpt from Electoral results for the Division of Bruce § 1980

1980 Australian federal election: Bruce
Party	Candidate	Votes	%	±%
Liberal	Sir Billy Snedden	34,982	48.8	−1.6
Labor	Gayle Whyte	27,457	38.3	+7.2
Democrats	Fraser Hercus	7,942	11.1	−4.1
Democratic Labor	Elaine Mulholland	954	1.3	−2.0
Independent	Wilhelm Kapphan	366	0.5	+0.5
Total formal votes		71,701	97.6	
Informal votes		1,737	2.4	
Turnout		73,438	96.7	
Two-party-preferred result
Liberal	Sir Billy Snedden	39,724	55.4	−5.6
Labor	Gayle Whyte	31,977	44.6	+5.6
Liberal hold		Swing	−5.6	

=== Burke ===
This section is an excerpt from Electoral results for the Division of Burke (1969–2004) § 1980

1980 Australian federal election: Burke
Party	Candidate	Votes	%	±%
Labor	Andrew Theophanous	37,984	54.1	+3.7
Liberal	Greg Ross	26,803	38.2	+5.9
Democrats	Eric Spencer	5,413	7.7	−3.4
Total formal votes		70,200	96.8	
Informal votes		2,357	3.2	
Turnout		72,557	95.0	
Two-party-preferred result
Labor	Andrew Theophanous		58.8	+2.2
Liberal	Greg Ross		41.2	−2.2
Labor hold		Swing	+2.2	

=== Casey ===
This section is an excerpt from Electoral results for the Division of Casey § 1980

1980 Australian federal election: Casey
Party	Candidate	Votes	%	±%
Liberal	Peter Falconer	31,107	45.4	−2.9
Labor	Peter Watson	26,841	39.2	+8.9
Democrats	Basil Smith	7,032	10.3	−6.4
Independent	Bertram Wainer	2,720	4.0	+4.0
United Christian	Martin Hetherich	563	0.8	+0.8
Independent	Wilfrid Thiele	193	0.3	+0.3
Total formal votes		68,456	97.7	
Informal votes		1,638	2.3	
Turnout		70,094	95.5	
Two-party-preferred result
Liberal	Peter Falconer	35,527	51.9	−8.3
Labor	Peter Watson	32,929	48.1	+8.3
Liberal hold		Swing	−8.3	

=== Chisholm ===
This section is an excerpt from Electoral results for the Division of Chisholm § 1980

1980 Australian federal election: Chisholm
Party	Candidate	Votes	%	±%
Liberal	Graham Harris	32,211	47.1	+0.6
Labor	Helen Mayer	28,058	41.1	+9.6
Democrats	Alan Swindon	7,377	10.8	−6.4
Australia	Terence Pooley	701	1.0	+1.0
Total formal votes		68,347	98.0	
Informal votes		1,394	2.0	
Turnout		69,741	95.3	
Two-party-preferred result
Liberal	Graham Harris	35,652	52.2	−6.7
Labor	Helen Mayer	32,695	47.8	+6.7
Liberal hold		Swing	−6.7	

=== Corangamite ===
This section is an excerpt from Electoral results for the Division of Corangamite § 1980

1980 Australian federal election: Corangamite
Party	Candidate	Votes	%	±%
Liberal	Tony Street	37,913	56.6	−1.9
Labor	Neil Gedge	20,959	31.3	+4.9
Democrats	Kathleen May	5,031	7.5	−2.4
Democratic Labor	Bernie Finn	3,043	4.5	+0.2
Total formal votes		66,946	98.3	
Informal votes		1,164	1.7	
Turnout		68,110	96.4	
Two-party-preferred result
Liberal	Tony Street		62.8	−5.0
Labor	Neil Gedge		37.2	+5.0
Liberal hold		Swing	−5.0	

=== Corio ===
This section is an excerpt from Electoral results for the Division of Corio § 1980

1980 Australian federal election: Corio
Party	Candidate	Votes	%	±%
Labor	Gordon Scholes	39,138	56.6	+8.2
Liberal	Mieczyslaw Parks	24,051	34.8	−5.5
Democrats	Reginald Sweeten	3,418	4.9	−2.4
Democratic Labor	James Jordan	2,528	3.7	−0.4
Total formal votes		69,135	97.5	
Informal votes		1,781	2.5	
Turnout		70,916	95.0	
Two-party-preferred result
Labor	Gordon Scholes		59.8	+6.9
Liberal	Mieczyslaw Parks		40.2	−6.9
Labor hold		Swing	+6.9	

=== Deakin ===
This section is an excerpt from Electoral results for the Division of Deakin § 1980

1980 Australian federal election: Deakin
Party	Candidate	Votes	%	±%
Liberal	Alan Jarman	33,011	43.7	−2.4
Labor	John Madden	31,277	41.4	+9.0
Democrats	Edwin Adamson	9,014	11.9	−4.4
Democratic Labor	Peter Ferwerda	2,291	3.0	−2.2
Total formal votes		75,593	98.1	
Informal votes		1,469	1.9	
Turnout		77,062	96.3	
Two-party-preferred result
Liberal	Alan Jarman	39,561	52.3	−5.1
Labor	John Madden	36,032	47.7	+5.1
Liberal hold		Swing	−5.1	

=== Diamond Valley ===
This section is an excerpt from Electoral results for the Division of Diamond Valley § 1980

1980 Australian federal election: Diamond Valley
Party	Candidate	Votes	%	±%
Liberal	Neil Brown	35,082	48.6	+0.1
Labor	John Scomparin	29,186	40.4	+9.2
Democrats	Geoffrey Loftus-Hills	7,936	11.0	−5.2
Total formal votes		72,204	98.0	
Informal votes		1,438	2.0	
Turnout		73,642	96.3	
Two-party-preferred result
Liberal	Neil Brown	38,750	53.7	−6.6
Labor	John Scomparin	33,454	46.3	+6.6
Liberal hold		Swing	−6.6	

=== Flinders ===
This section is an excerpt from Electoral results for the Division of Flinders § 1980

1980 Australian federal election: Flinders
Party	Candidate	Votes	%	±%
Liberal	Phillip Lynch	36,587	50.3	−0.2
Labor	Jean McLean	28,565	39.2	+9.4
Democrats	William Towers	7,643	10.5	−5.0
Total formal votes		72,795	98.1	
Informal votes		1,433	1.9	
Turnout		74,228	95.1	
Two-party-preferred result
Liberal	Phillip Lynch		54.6	−6.1
Labor	Jean McLean		45.4	+6.1
Liberal hold		Swing	−6.1	

=== Gellibrand ===
This section is an excerpt from Electoral results for the Division of Gellibrand § 1980

1980 Australian federal election: Gellibrand
Party	Candidate	Votes	%	±%
Labor	Ralph Willis	43,474	65.5	+7.2
Liberal	John Kelly	14,711	22.2	−0.9
Democrats	Shirley Bold	5,955	9.0	+0.4
Socialist Workers	Lynne Bryer	2,268	3.4	+3.4
Total formal votes		66,408	94.4	
Informal votes		3,184	4.6	
Turnout		69,592	95.0	
Two-party-preferred result
Labor	Ralph Willis		73.4	+8.9
Liberal	John Kelly		26.6	−8.9
Labor hold		Swing	+8.9	

=== Gippsland ===
This section is an excerpt from Electoral results for the Division of Gippsland § 1980

1980 Australian federal election: Gippsland
Party	Candidate	Votes	%	±%
National Country	Peter Nixon	37,180	56.7	−1.3
Labor	Graeme McIntyre	19,791	30.2	+6.5
Democrats	Pierre Forcier	6,861	10.5	+0.1
Independent	Bruce Ingle	1,684	2.6	+2.6
Total formal votes		65,516	97.9	
Informal votes		1,385	2.1	
Turnout		66,901	95.1	
Two-party-preferred result
National Country	Peter Nixon		61.9	−2.6
Labor	Graeme McIntyre		38.1	+2.6
National Country hold		Swing	−2.6	

=== Henty ===
This section is an excerpt from Electoral results for the Division of Henty § 1980

1980 Australian federal election: Henty
Party	Candidate	Votes	%	±%
Labor	Joan Child	32,102	49.1	+7.6
Liberal	Ken Aldred	27,702	42.3	−2.7
Democrats	Jonathan Melland	3,926	6.0	−3.9
Democratic Labor	John Mulholland	1,698	2.6	−0.5
Total formal votes		65,428	97.8	
Informal votes		1,441	2.2	
Turnout		66,869	95.2	
Two-party-preferred result
Labor	Joan Child	34,541	52.8	+5.5
Liberal	Ken Aldred	30,887	47.2	−5.5
Labor gain from Liberal		Swing	+5.5	

=== Higgins ===
This section is an excerpt from Electoral results for the Division of Higgins § 1980

1980 Australian federal election: Higgins
Party	Candidate	Votes	%	±%
Liberal	Roger Shipton	37,292	57.0	+1.8
Labor	Jennifer Bundy	22,512	34.4	+8.2
Democrats	James Thornley	4,554	7.0	−5.5
Imperial British	Maureen Holmes	636	1.0	+1.0
Independent	Wilhelm Kapphan	437	0.7	+0.7
Total formal votes		65,431	97.9	
Informal votes		1,412	2.1	
Turnout		66,843	93.4	
Two-party-preferred result
Liberal	Roger Shipton		60.7	−5.3
Labor	Jennifer Bundy		39.3	+5.3
Liberal hold		Swing	−5.3	

=== Holt ===
This section is an excerpt from Electoral results for the Division of Holt § 1980

1980 Australian federal election: Holt
Party	Candidate	Votes	%	±%
Labor	Michael Duffy	39,232	52.1	+11.9
Liberal	William Yates	28,940	38.4	−4.6
Democrats	Brian Stockton	5,810	7.7	−5.1
Democratic Labor	Michael Rowe	1,352	1.8	−2.3
Total formal votes		75,334	97.2	
Informal votes		2,191	2.8	
Turnout		77,525	95.5	
Two-party-preferred result
Labor	Michael Duffy		56.9	+8.7
Liberal	William Yates		43.1	−8.7
Labor gain from Liberal		Swing	+8.7	

=== Hotham ===
This section is an excerpt from Electoral results for the Division of Hotham § 1980

1980 Australian federal election: Hotham
Party	Candidate	Votes	%	±%
Labor	Lewis Kent	35,201	48.5	+10.4
Liberal	Roger Johnston	28,054	38.7	−1.7
Democrats	Robyn Groves	8,138	11.2	−7.2
Democratic Labor	Edward Woods	1,128	1.6	−1.5
Total formal votes		72,521	97.0	
Informal votes		2,250	3.0	
Turnout		74,771	95.9	
Two-party-preferred result
Labor	Lewis Kent	39,177	54.0	+5.7
Liberal	Roger Johnston	33,344	46.0	−5.7
Labor gain from Liberal		Swing	+5.7	

=== Indi ===
This section is an excerpt from Electoral results for the Division of Indi § 1980

1980 Australian federal election: Indi
Party	Candidate	Votes	%	±%
Liberal	Ewen Cameron	26,745	41.8	+15.6
Labor	Carole Marple	21,190	33.1	+7.9
National Country	Allan Garrett	12,486	19.5	−16.4
Democrats	Ralph Fleming	2,695	4.2	−2.9
Independent	Patrick Flanagan	581	0.9	+0.9
Independent	Brian Lumsden	334	0.5	+0.5
Total formal votes		64,031	97.0	
Informal votes		1,972	3.0	
Turnout		66,003	95.9	
Two-party-preferred result
Liberal	Ewen Cameron	39,947	62.4	+7.3
Labor	Carole Marple	24,084	37.6	+37.6
Liberal hold		Swing	+7.3	

=== Isaacs ===
This section is an excerpt from Electoral results for the Division of Isaacs § 1980

1980 Australian federal election: Isaacs
Party	Candidate	Votes	%	±%
Labor	David Charles	31,192	45.1	+10.5
Liberal	Bill Burns	26,293	38.0	−6.4
Democrats	Michael Bakos	9,777	14.1	−2.9
Independent	Sydney Balhorn	1,955	2.8	+2.8
Total formal votes		69,217	97.8	
Informal votes		1,534	2.2	
Turnout		70,751	95.4	
Two-party-preferred result
Labor	David Charles	35,856	51.8	+9.1
Liberal	Bill Burns	33,361	48.2	−9.1
Labor gain from Liberal		Swing	+9.1	

=== Kooyong ===
This section is an excerpt from Electoral results for the Division of Kooyong § 1980

1980 Australian federal election: Kooyong
Party	Candidate	Votes	%	±%
Liberal	Andrew Peacock	38,013	57.6	+2.0
Labor	Wesley Blackmore	22,356	33.9	+8.2
Democrats	James Lysaght	5,630	8.5	−3.9
Total formal votes		65,999	98.2	
Informal votes		1,181	1.8	
Turnout		67,180	93.6	
Two-party-preferred result
Liberal	Andrew Peacock		61.1	−6.6
Labor	Wesley Blackmore		38.9	+6.6
Liberal hold		Swing	−6.6	

=== La Trobe ===
This section is an excerpt from Electoral results for the Division of La Trobe § 1980

1980 Australian federal election: La Trobe
Party	Candidate	Votes	%	±%
Labor	Peter Milton	31,439	45.2	+4.9
Liberal	Marshall Baillieu	28,282	40.7	−0.9
Democrats	James Leicester	7,201	10.4	−3.7
United Christian	Cornelis Hellema	1,487	2.1	+2.1
Democratic Labor	Desmond Burke	867	1.2	−1.1
Independent	Wilhelm Kapphan	262	0.4	+0.4
Total formal votes		69,538	97.2	
Informal votes		2,015	2.8	
Turnout		71,553	95.4	
Two-party-preferred result
Labor	Peter Milton	36,360	52.3	+3.1
Liberal	Marshall Baillieu	33,178	47.7	−3.1
Labor gain from Liberal		Swing	+3.1	

=== Lalor ===
This section is an excerpt from Electoral results for the Division of Lalor § 1980

1980 Australian federal election: Lalor
Party	Candidate	Votes	%	±%
Labor	Barry Jones	50,509	68.3	+17.8
Liberal	Thomas Meskos	18,944	25.6	−2.5
Democrats	Ivan Pollock	4,446	6.0	−3.9
Total formal votes		73,899	96.0	
Informal votes		3,103	4.0	
Turnout		77,002	95.6	
Two-party-preferred result
Labor	Barry Jones		71.9	+14.3
Liberal	Thomas Meskos		28.1	−14.3
Labor hold		Swing	+14.3	

=== Mallee ===
This section is an excerpt from Electoral results for the Division of Mallee § 1980

1980 Australian federal election: Mallee
Party	Candidate	Votes	%	±%
National Country	Peter Fisher	29,502	47.2	−1.1
Labor	Geoffrey Ferns	14,967	23.9	+2.1
Liberal	Neville Goodwin	13,393	21.4	−2.4
Democrats	Colin Kavanagh	2,736	4.4	+4.4
Independent	Leslie Connolly	1,592	2.5	+2.5
Independent	Ronald Nicholson	362	0.6	+0.6
Total formal votes		62,552	96.5	
Informal votes		2,254	3.5	
Turnout		64,806	95.6	
Two-party-preferred result
National Country	Peter Fisher	44,303	70.8	−2.5
Labor	Geoffrey Ferns	18,249	29.2	+2.5
National Country hold		Swing	−2.5	

=== Maribyrnong ===
This section is an excerpt from Electoral results for the Division of Maribyrnong § 1980

1980 Australian federal election: Maribyrnong
Party	Candidate	Votes	%	±%
Labor	Moss Cass	37,991	54.6	+11.0
Liberal	Geoffrey Ireland	24,439	35.1	−1.6
Democrats	Henrik Jersic	7,129	10.2	−3.3
Total formal votes		69,559	97.4	
Informal votes		1,880	2.6	
Turnout		71,439	96.2	
Two-party-preferred result
Labor	Moss Cass		60.7	+8.7
Liberal	Geoffrey Ireland		39.3	−8.7
Labor hold		Swing	+8.7	

=== McMillan ===
This section is an excerpt from Electoral results for the Division of McMillan § 1980

1980 Australian federal election: McMillan
Party	Candidate	Votes	%	±%
Liberal	Barry Simon	28,957	44.2	−0.3
Labor	Barry Cunningham	28,100	42.9	+7.5
Democrats	Sandra Burke	4,748	7.3	−6.9
Democratic Labor	Brian Handley	3,295	5.0	+0.2
Independent	Robert McCracken	378	0.6	+0.6
Total formal votes		65,478	97.3	
Informal votes		1,803	2.7	
Turnout		67,281	95.7	
Two-party-preferred result
Labor	Barry Cunningham	33,647	51.4	+6.2
Liberal	Barry Simon	31,831	48.6	−6.2
Labor gain from Liberal		Swing	+6.2	

=== Melbourne ===
This section is an excerpt from Electoral results for the Division of Melbourne § 1980

1980 Australian federal election: Melbourne
Party	Candidate	Votes	%	±%
Labor	Ted Innes	35,812	60.7	+6.6
Liberal	Robert Fallshaw	16,573	28.1	+4.5
Democrats	Alan Hughes	4,199	7.1	−1.8
Communist	Max Ogden	1,534	2.6	+0.1
Imperial British	James Ferrari	879	1.5	+1.5
Total formal votes		58,997	95.7	
Informal votes		2,677	4.3	
Turnout		61,674	90.1	
Two-party-preferred result
Labor	Ted Innes		68.1	+6.3
Liberal	Robert Fallshaw		31.9	−6.3
Labor hold		Swing	+6.3	

=== Melbourne Ports ===
This section is an excerpt from Electoral results for the Division of Melbourne Ports § 1980

1980 Australian federal election: Melbourne Ports
Party	Candidate	Votes	%	±%
Labor	Clyde Holding	33,992	57.0	+7.0
Liberal	Colin Bell	20,252	33.9	+0.9
Democrats	Stephen Duthy	4,336	7.3	−2.5
Independent	Gordon Moffatt	806	1.4	+1.4
Independent	Wilhelm Kapphan	270	0.5	+0.5
Total formal votes		59,656	96.2	
Informal votes		2,373	3.8	
Turnout		62,029	89.5	
Two-party-preferred result
Labor	Clyde Holding		62.3	+6.8
Liberal	Colin Bell		37.7	−6.8
Labor hold		Swing	+6.8	

=== Murray ===
This section is an excerpt from Electoral results for the Division of Murray § 1980

1980 Australian federal election: Murray
Party	Candidate	Votes	%	±%
National Country	Bruce Lloyd	30,338	46.2	−6.6
Labor	Joan Groves	15,679	23.9	+6.9
Liberal	Bill Hunter	14,616	22.3	+7.4
Democrats	Douglas Linford	3,856	5.9	−4.7
Independent	Diane Teasdale	1,171	1.8	+1.8
Total formal votes		65,660	97.0	
Informal votes		2,009	3.0	
Turnout		67,669	96.5	
Two-party-preferred result
National Country	Bruce Lloyd	44,323	67.5	+1.3
Labor	Joan Groves	21,337	32.5	−1.3
National Country hold		Swing	+1.3	

=== Scullin ===
This section is an excerpt from Electoral results for the Division of Scullin § 1980

1980 Australian federal election: Scullin
Party	Candidate	Votes	%	±%
Labor	Harry Jenkins	46,883	67.1	+15.3
Liberal	Geoffrey Lutz	18,892	27.0	−6.5
Democrats	Brian Kidd	4,068	5.8	−3.6
Total formal votes		69,843	96.8	
Informal votes		2,304	3.2	
Turnout		72,147	95.4	
Two-party-preferred result
Labor	Harry Jenkins		70.6	+13.6
Liberal	Geoffrey Lutz		29.4	−13.6
Labor hold		Swing	+13.6	

=== Wannon ===
This section is an excerpt from Electoral results for the Division of Wannon § 1980

1980 Australian federal election: Wannon
Party	Candidate	Votes	%	±%
Liberal	Malcolm Fraser	37,680	58.4	+1.7
Labor	Keith Wilson	22,670	35.1	+4.1
Democrats	Bernhard Kruger	2,625	4.1	−1.7
Independent	Joseph Young	1,546	2.4	−6.9
Total formal votes		64,521	98.3	
Informal votes		1,089	1.7	
Turnout		65,610	96.5	
Two-party-preferred result
Liberal	Malcolm Fraser		61.2	−4.4
Labor	Keith Wilson		38.8	+4.4
Liberal hold		Swing	−4.4	

=== Wills ===
This section is an excerpt from Electoral results for the Division of Wills § 1980

1980 Australian federal election: Wills
Party	Candidate	Votes	%	±%
Labor	Bob Hawke	42,815	65.1	+7.5
Liberal	Vincenzo d'Aquino	17,337	26.4	+0.0
Democrats	Kenneth Goss	2,407	3.7	−4.8
Democratic Labor	Thomas Stewart	1,256	1.9	−5.5
Socialist Workers	Solomon Salby	677	1.0	+1.0
Socialist Labour	Michael Head	490	0.7	+0.7
Independent	Martin Newell	410	0.6	+0.6
Communist	Philip Herington	368	0.6	+0.6
Total formal votes		65,760	94.5	
Informal votes		3,846	5.5	
Turnout		69,606	94.3	
Two-party-preferred result
Labor	Bob Hawke		69.9	+7.3
Liberal	Vincenzo d'Aquino		30.1	−7.3
Labor hold		Swing	+7.3	

== Queensland ==
1980 Australian federal election (Queensland)
← 1977	18 October 1980	1983 →

All 19 Queensland seats in the House of Representatives 10 seats needed for a majority
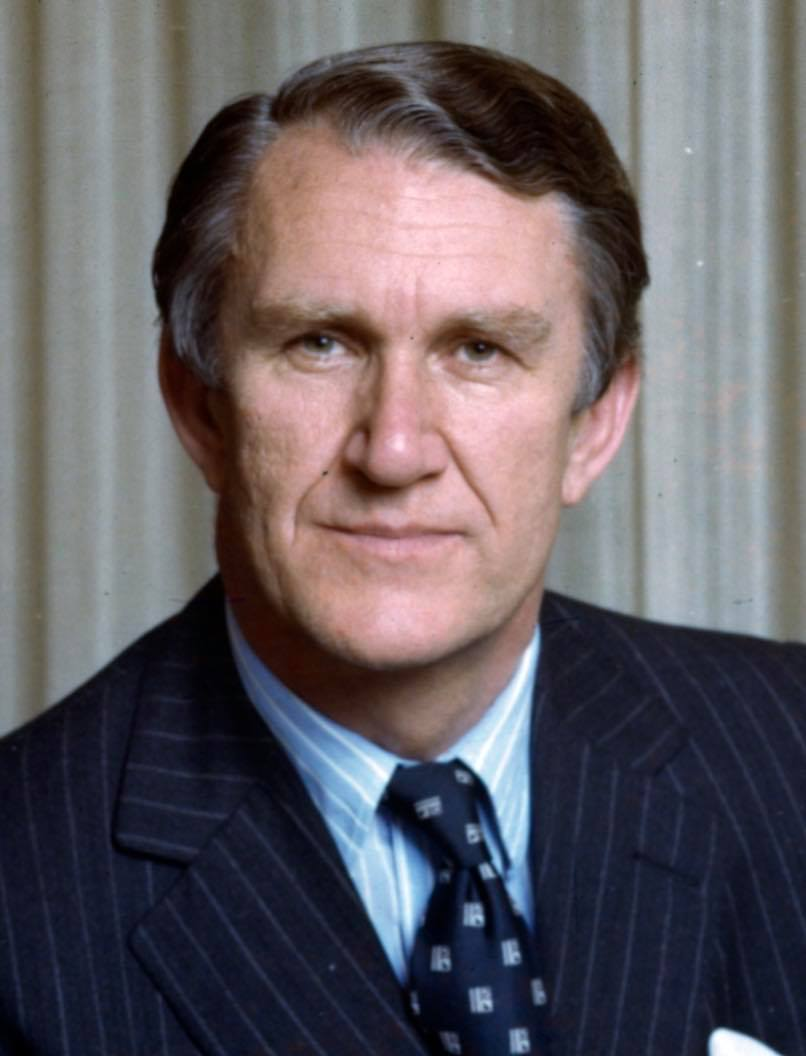

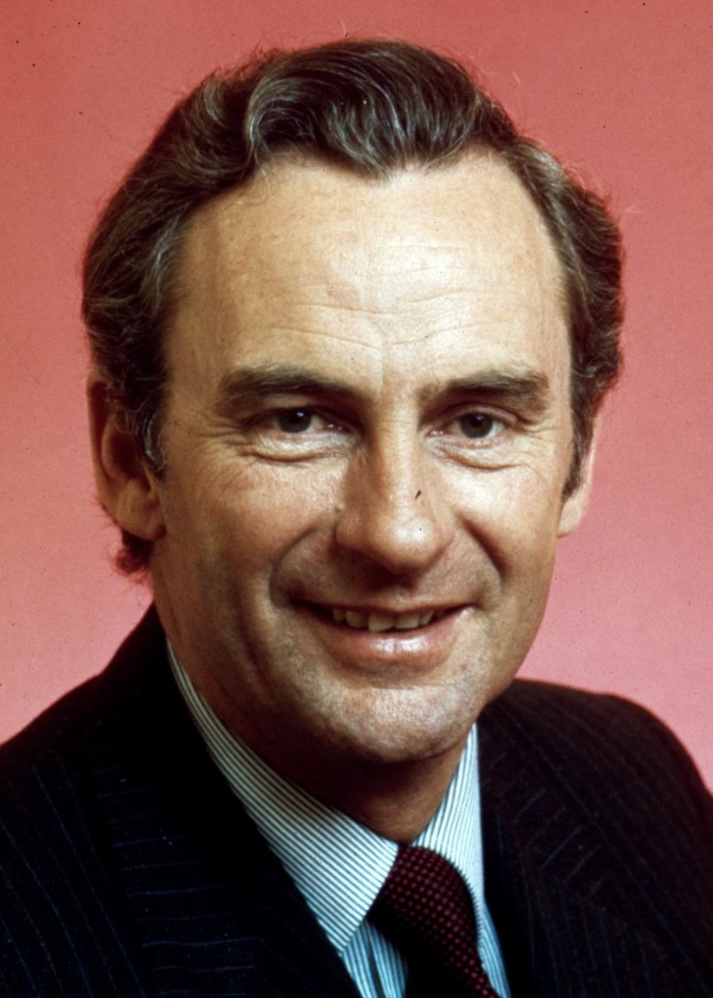
	First party	Second party
Leader	Malcolm Fraser	Bill Hayden
Party	Coalition	Labor
Seats before	16	3
Seats won	14	5
Seat change	▼2	▲2
Popular vote	615,822	535,846
Percentage	49.2%	42.8%
Swing	▼4.50pp	▲5.1pp
TPP	53.1%	46.9%
TPP swing	▼4.9pp	▲4.9pp

=== Bowman ===
This section is an excerpt from Electoral results for the Division of Bowman § 1980

1980 Australian federal election: Bowman
Party	Candidate	Votes	%	±%
Liberal	David Jull	33,695	48.8	−1.2
Labor	Len Keogh	31,722	45.9	+6.2
Democrats	Thomas Martin	3,648	5.3	−3.3
Total formal votes		69,065	98.6	
Informal votes		978	1.4	
Turnout		70,043	94.5	
Two-party-preferred result
Liberal	David Jull	35,351	51.2	−5.1
Labor	Len Keogh	33,714	48.8	+5.1
Liberal hold		Swing	−5.1	

=== Brisbane ===
This section is an excerpt from Electoral results for the Division of Brisbane § 1980

1980 Australian federal election: Brisbane
Party	Candidate	Votes	%	±%
Labor	Manfred Cross	29,621	48.1	+6.8
Liberal	Peter Johnson	27,497	44.7	−2.4
Democrats	Anthony Walters	3,664	6.0	−4.0
Independent	William Kenney	788	1.3	+1.3
Total formal votes		61,570	98.1	
Informal votes		1,180	1.9	
Turnout		62,750	94.5	
Two-party-preferred result
Labor	Manfred Cross	31,881	51.8	+5.0
Liberal	Peter Johnson	29,689	48.2	−5.0
Labor gain from Liberal		Swing	+5.0	

=== Capricornia ===
This section is an excerpt from Electoral results for the Division of Capricornia § 1980

1980 Australian federal election: Capricornia
Party	Candidate	Votes	%	±%
Labor	Doug Everingham	32,688	50.9	+2.0
National Country	Colin Carige	21,292	33.2	−8.1
Liberal	William Park	7,781	12.1	+6.2
Democrats	Lloyd Webber	2,177	3.4	−0.2
Progress	Paul Rackemann	225	0.4	+0.1
Total formal votes		64,162	98.7	
Informal votes		855	1.3	
Turnout		65,017	95.9	
Two-party-preferred result
Labor	Doug Everingham		54.3	+3.1
National Country	Colin Carige		45.7	−3.1
Labor hold		Swing	+3.1	

=== Darling Downs ===
This section is an excerpt from Electoral results for the Division of Darling Downs § 1980

1980 Australian federal election: Darling Downs
Party	Candidate	Votes	%	±%
National Country	Tom McVeigh	41,011	63.3	−4.8
Labor	Janet Hunt	19,379	29.9	+0.3
Democrats	Maria Hayboer	3,551	5.5	+5.5
Progress	David Proud	870	1.3	−1.1
Total formal votes		64,811	98.7	
Informal votes		850	1.3	
Turnout		65,661	94.8	
Two-party-preferred result
National Country	Tom McVeigh		65.8	−4.5
Labor	Janet Hunt		34.2	+4.5
National Country hold		Swing	−4.5	

=== Dawson ===
This section is an excerpt from Electoral results for the Division of Dawson § 1980

1980 Australian federal election: Dawson
Party	Candidate	Votes	%	±%
National Country	Ray Braithwaite	33,205	50.1	−5.8
Labor	Barbara Hill	29,960	45.2	+3.3
Democrats	Brian Caldwell	2,299	3.5	+3.5
Independent	Robert Oakes	539	0.8	+0.8
Progress	Kelly Crombie	330	0.5	−1.7
Total formal votes		66,333	98.4	
Informal votes		1,080	1.6	
Turnout		67,413	93.8	
Two-party-preferred result
National Country	Ray Braithwaite		52.2	−5.7
Labor	Barbara Hill		47.8	+5.7
National Country hold		Swing	−5.7	

=== Fadden ===
This section is an excerpt from Electoral results for the Division of Fadden § 1980

1980 Australian federal election: Fadden
Party	Candidate	Votes	%	±%
Liberal	Don Cameron	37,170	48.0	+14.4
Labor	David Beddall	33,736	43.6	+5.2
Democrats	Janice Barber	5,812	7.5	−1.4
Progress	Dallas Graham	648	0.8	+0.5
Total formal votes		77,366	98.1	
Informal votes		1,506	1.9	
Turnout		78,872	94.0	
Two-party-preferred result
Liberal	Don Cameron	39,808	51.5	−4.5
Labor	David Beddall	37,558	48.5	+4.5
Liberal hold		Swing	−4.5	

=== Fisher ===
This section is an excerpt from Electoral results for the Division of Fisher § 1980

1980 Australian federal election: Fisher
Party	Candidate	Votes	%	±%
National Country	Evan Adermann	41,167	53.3	−6.3
Labor	Fay Price	26,865	34.8	+5.7
Democrats	Gavin Black	6,250	8.1	−1.7
Independent	Gail Perry	2,134	2.8	+2.8
Progress	Rodney Jeanneret	848	1.1	−0.5
Total formal votes		77,264	97.9	
Informal votes		1,653	2.1	
Turnout		78,917	94.8	
Two-party-preferred result
National Country	Evan Adermann		58.9	−7.0
Labor	Fay Price		41.1	+7.0
National Country hold		Swing	−7.0	

=== Griffith ===
This section is an excerpt from Electoral results for the Division of Griffith § 1980

1980 Australian federal election: Griffith
Party	Candidate	Votes	%	±%
Labor	Ben Humphreys	32,249	55.8	+8.8
Liberal	Dennis Young	16,019	27.7	−5.8
National Country	Noel Willersdorf	4,732	8.2	−1.5
Democrats	Gillian Newman	2,474	4.3	−3.6
Socialist Workers	Mark Carey	2,293	4.0	+4.0
Total formal votes		57,767	97.1	
Informal votes		1,707	2.9	
Turnout		59,474	91.9	
Two-party-preferred result
Labor	Ben Humphreys		62.9	+9.4
Liberal	Dennis Young		37.1	−9.4
Labor hold		Swing	+9.4	

=== Herbert ===
This section is an excerpt from Electoral results for the Division of Herbert § 1980

1980 Australian federal election: Herbert
Party	Candidate	Votes	%	±%
Liberal	Gordon Dean	31,538	47.9	+14.4
Labor	Ted Lindsay	30,575	46.5	+9.5
Democrats	John Lamb	3,690	5.6	−2.2
Total formal votes		65,803	98.5	
Informal votes		978	1.5	
Turnout		66,781	93.3	
Two-party-preferred result
Liberal	Gordon Dean	33,462	50.9	−6.8
Labor	Ted Lindsay	32,341	49.1	+6.8
Liberal hold		Swing	−6.8	

=== Kennedy ===
This section is an excerpt from Electoral results for the Division of Kennedy § 1980

1980 Australian federal election: Kennedy
Party	Candidate	Votes	%	±%
National Country	Bob Katter, Sr.	33,744	60.2	−1.2
Labor	Susan Hadlow	20,194	36.0	+3.3
Progress	James Fryar	2,103	3.8	+2.0
Total formal votes		56,041	98.2	
Informal votes		1,021	1.8	
Turnout		57,062	92.4	
Two-party-preferred result
National Country	Bob Katter, Sr.		62.7	−1.5
Labor	Susan Hadlow		37.3	+1.5
National Country hold		Swing	−1.5	

=== Leichhardt ===
This section is an excerpt from Electoral results for the Division of Leichhardt § 1980

1980 Australian federal election: Leichhardt
Party	Candidate	Votes	%	±%
National Country	David Thomson	30,105	48.9	+1.6
Labor	Anthony Mijo	28,500	46.3	+0.0
Democrats	Ian Paul	2,985	4.8	−1.7
Total formal votes		61,590	97.9	
Informal votes		1,308	2.1	
Turnout		62,898	92.3	
Two-party-preferred result
National Country	David Thomson	31,459	51.1	+0.2
Labor	Anthony Mijo	30,131	48.9	−0.2
National Country hold		Swing	+0.2	

=== Lilley ===
This section is an excerpt from Electoral results for the Division of Lilley § 1980

1980 Australian federal election: Lilley
Party	Candidate	Votes	%	±%
Labor	Elaine Darling	29,434	48.0	+8.8
Liberal	Kevin Cairns	28,964	47.2	−1.4
Democrats	Joan Hadley	2,920	4.8	−3.6
Total formal votes		61,318	98.4	
Informal votes		977	1.6	
Turnout		62,295	94.0	
Two-party-preferred result
Labor	Elaine Darling	31,126	50.8	+6.8
Liberal	Kevin Cairns	30,192	49.2	−6.8
Labor gain from Liberal		Swing	+6.8	

=== Maranoa ===
This section is an excerpt from Electoral results for the Division of Maranoa § 1980

1980 Australian federal election: Maranoa
Party	Candidate	Votes	%	±%
National Country	Ian Cameron	35,035	57.3	−11.4
Labor	Kenneth Abbey	18,047	29.5	+5.8
Liberal	Reginald Kerslake	5,655	9.2	+9.2
Democrats	Austin Brannigan	2,412	3.9	+0.6
Total formal votes		61,149	98.5	
Informal votes		902	1.5	
Turnout		62,051	94.5	
Two-party-preferred result
National Country	Ian Cameron		67.1	−6.5
Labor	Kenneth Abbey		32.9	+6.5
National Country hold		Swing	−6.5	

=== McPherson ===
This section is an excerpt from Electoral results for the Division of McPherson § 1980

1980 Australian federal election: McPherson
Party	Candidate	Votes	%	±%
Liberal	Eric Robinson	32,459	43.3	−16.8
Labor	Walter Ehrich	23,061	30.8	+3.2
Independent	Louis Rowan	14,350	19.1	+19.1
Democrats	Ian Crick	3,761	5.0	−4.2
Independent	William Aabraham-Steer	1,339	1.8	+0.3
Total formal votes		74,970	97.7	
Informal votes		1,778	2.3	
Turnout		76,748	92.7	
Two-party-preferred result
Liberal	Eric Robinson	40,170	53.6	−12.7
Labor	Walter Ehrich	34,800	46.4	+12.7
Liberal hold		Swing	−12.7	

=== Moreton ===
This section is an excerpt from Electoral results for the Division of Moreton § 1980

1980 Australian federal election: Moreton
Party	Candidate	Votes	%	±%
Liberal	James Killen	31,157	50.7	−5.3
Labor	Barbara Robson	25,997	42.3	+8.2
Democrats	Betty Whitworth	2,877	4.7	−2.3
Independent	Graham Bell	1,064	1.7	+0.2
Progress	Patrick Dixon	407	0.7	−0.7
Total formal votes		61,502	98.1	
Informal votes		1,221	1.9	
Turnout		62,723	94.7	
Two-party-preferred result
Liberal	James Killen		54.6	−7.4
Labor	Barbara Robson		45.4	+7.4
Liberal hold		Swing	−7.4	

=== Oxley ===
This section is an excerpt from Electoral results for the Division of Oxley § 1980

1980 Australian federal election: Oxley
Party	Candidate	Votes	%	±%
Labor	Bill Hayden	45,094	64.1	+9.1
Liberal	Ronda Herrmann	20,461	29.1	−7.9
Democrats	Wayne Martin	2,896	4.1	−2.7
Independent	Miriam Cope	1,311	1.9	+1.9
	Robert Voysey	620	0.9	+0.9
Total formal votes		70,382	98.0	
Informal votes		1,432	2.0	
Turnout		71,814	95.1	
Two-party-preferred result
Labor	Bill Hayden		68.8	+10.3
Liberal	Ronda Herrmann		31.2	−10.3
Labor hold		Swing	+10.3	

=== Petrie ===
This section is an excerpt from Electoral results for the Division of Petrie § 1980

1980 Australian federal election: Petrie
Party	Candidate	Votes	%	±%
Liberal	John Hodges	32,979	48.0	−4.8
Labor	Deane Wells	29,319	42.7	+8.7
Democrats	Pauline Moylan	4,668	6.8	−5.1
Progress	Phillip Grimson	1,768	2.6	+1.3
Total formal votes		68,734	98.4	
Informal votes		1,091	1.6	
Turnout		69,825	94.9	
Two-party-preferred result
Liberal	John Hodges	36,671	53.4	−6.5
Labor	Deane Wells	32,063	46.6	+6.5
Liberal hold		Swing	−6.5	

=== Ryan ===
This section is an excerpt from Electoral results for the Division of Ryan § 1980

1980 Australian federal election: Ryan
Party	Candidate	Votes	%	±%
Liberal	John Moore	36,780	55.1	−5.9
Labor	Peter Beattie	22,697	34.0	+0.8
Democrats	Geoffrey Rees	6,004	9.0	+3.2
Progress	Philip Sturgess	1,297	1.9	+1.9
Total formal votes		66,778	98.6	
Informal votes		921	1.4	
Turnout		67,699	94.6	
Two-party-preferred result
Liberal	John Moore		60.4	−3.0
Labor	Peter Beattie		39.6	+3.0
Liberal hold		Swing	−3.0	

=== Wide Bay ===
This section is an excerpt from Electoral results for the Division of Wide Bay § 1980

1980 Australian federal election: Wide Bay
Party	Candidate	Votes	%	±%
National Country	Clarrie Millar	33,377	50.4	−2.8
Labor	James Finemore	26,708	40.4	+3.6
Democrats	Geoffrey Schuh	4,414	6.7	−3.3
Progress	Raymond Bird	1,675	2.5	+2.5
Total formal votes		66,174	98.5	
Informal votes		997	1.5	
Turnout		67,171	95.3	
Two-party-preferred result
National Country	Clarrie Millar		54.4	−3.8
Labor	James Finemore		45.6	+3.8
National Country hold		Swing	−3.8	

== South Australia ==
1980 Australian federal election (South Australia)
← 1977	18 October 1980	1983 →

All 11 SA seats in the House of Representatives 5 seats needed for a majority
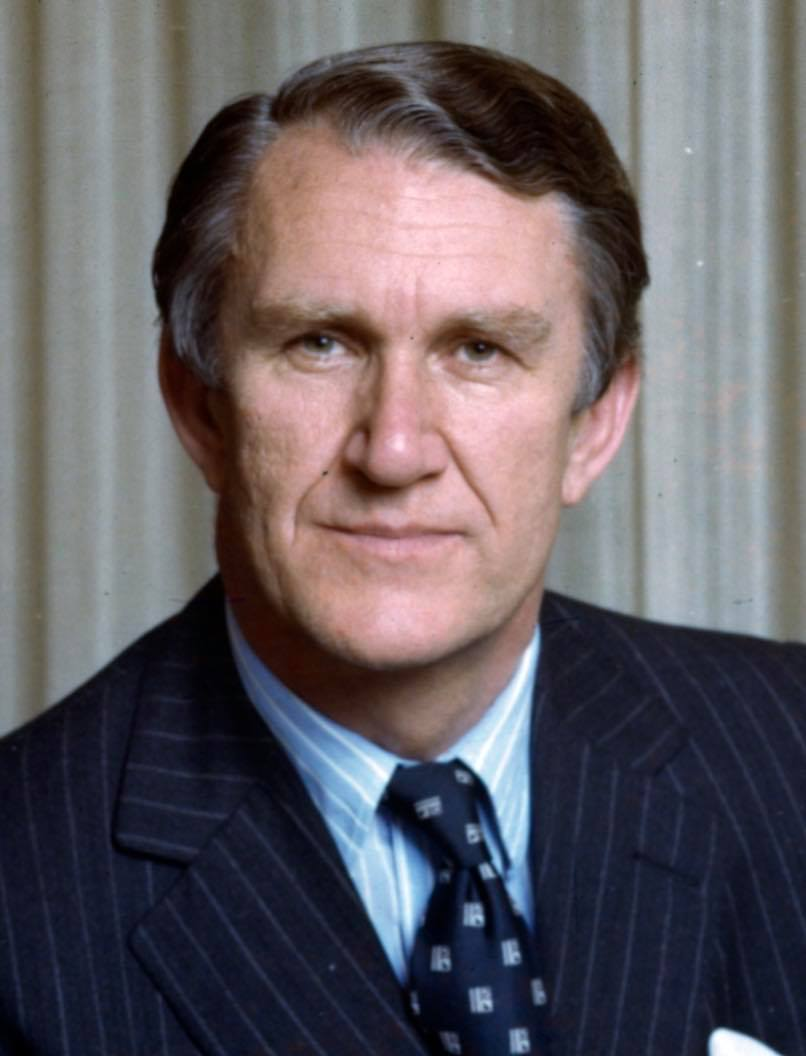

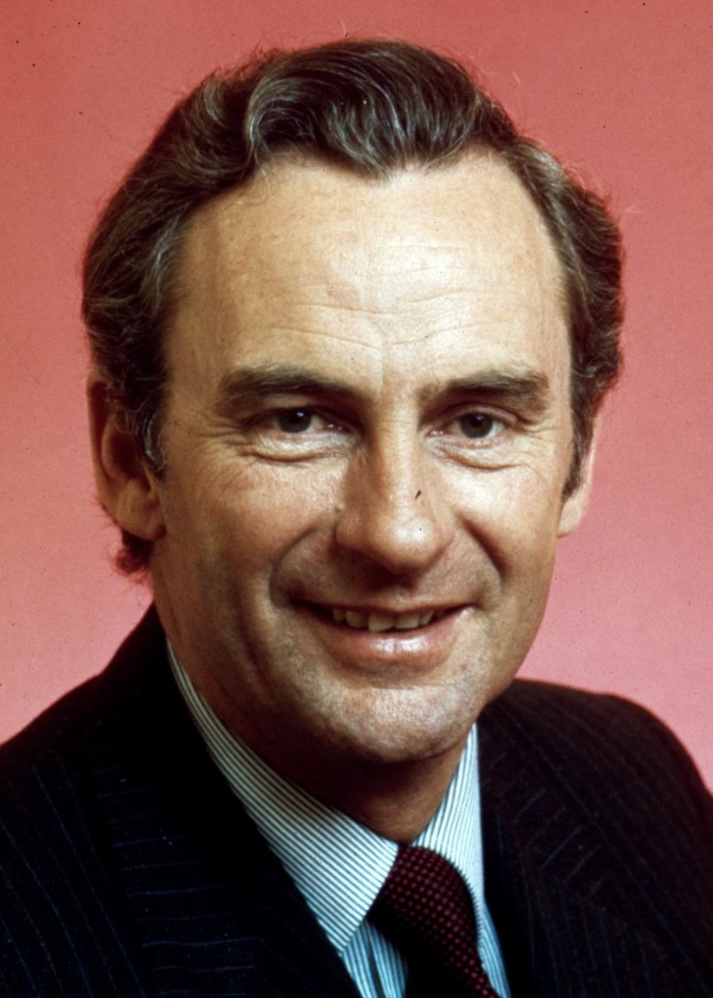
	First party	Second party
Leader	Malcolm Fraser	Bill Hayden
Party	Coalition	Labor
Seats before	5	6
Seats won	5	6
Seat change	Steady	Steady
Popular vote	359,918	348,649
Percentage	45.9%	44.5%
Swing	▲0.1pp	▲1.9pp
TPP	50.4%	49.6%
TPP swing	▼0.9pp	▲0.9pp

=== Adelaide ===
This section is an excerpt from Electoral results for the Division of Adelaide § 1980

1980 Australian federal election: Adelaide
Party	Candidate	Votes	%	±%
Labor	Chris Hurford	36,124	52.1	+1.2
Liberal	Peter Camm	25,057	36.2	−2.1
Democrats	Peter Adamson	8,109	11.7	+0.9
Total formal votes		69,290	97.2	
Informal votes		2,008	2.8	
Turnout		71,298	94.1	
Two-party-preferred result
Labor	Chris Hurford		58.5	+2.2
Liberal	Peter Camm		41.5	−2.2
Labor hold		Swing	+2.2	

=== Barker ===
This section is an excerpt from Electoral results for the Division of Barker § 1980

1980 Australian federal election: Barker
Party	Candidate	Votes	%	±%
Liberal	James Porter	40,445	57.5	−5.9
Labor	Norman Napper	20,323	28.9	+1.0
Democrats	Ivor Childs	3,924	5.6	−3.1
National Country	Anthony Beck	3,774	5.4	+5.4
National Country	Kim Ross	1,920	2.7	+2.7
Total formal votes		70,386	97.1	
Informal votes		2,090	2.9	
Turnout		72,476	95.8	
Two-party-preferred result
Liberal	James Porter		57.5	−5.9
Labor	Norman Napper		42.5	+5.9
Liberal hold		Swing	−5.9	

=== Bonython ===
This section is an excerpt from Electoral results for the Division of Bonython § 1980

1980 Australian federal election: Bonython
Party	Candidate	Votes	%	±%
Labor	Neal Blewett	40,825	54.4	+3.9
Liberal	Mark Mau	24,507	32.7	+1.9
Democrats	John Longhurst	8,288	11.1	−7.5
Socialist Labour	John Villain	716	1.0	+1.0
Progressive Conservative	Donald Keitel	656	0.9	+0.9
Total formal votes		74,992	96.7	
Informal votes		2,535	3.3	
Turnout		77,527	94.4	
Two-party-preferred result
Labor	Neal Blewett		62.4	+2.6
Liberal	Mark Mau		37.6	−2.6
Labor hold		Swing	+2.6	

=== Boothby ===
This section is an excerpt from Electoral results for the Division of Boothby § 1980

1980 Australian federal election: Boothby
Party	Candidate	Votes	%	±%
Liberal	John McLeay	41,542	56.2	−1.2
Labor	Bruce Whyatt	22,001	29.7	+3.9
Democrats	Martin Holt	9,664	13.1	−3.7
Progressive Conservative	James Russell	762	1.0	+1.0
Total formal votes		73,969	98.1	
Informal votes		1,408	1.9	
Turnout		75,377	94.4	
Two-party-preferred result
Liberal	John McLeay		62.6	−3.2
Labor	Bruce Whyatt		37.4	+3.2
Liberal hold		Swing	−3.2	

=== Grey ===
This section is an excerpt from Electoral results for the Division of Grey § 1980

1980 Australian federal election: Grey
Party	Candidate	Votes	%	±%
Labor	Laurie Wallis	33,871	50.1	+3.4
Liberal	Brian Fitzgerald	27,263	40.4	+1.2
National Country	Anthony Haskett	3,342	4.9	−4.2
Democrats	Mary Good	3,084	4.6	−0.4
Total formal votes		67,560	97.4	
Informal votes		1,801	2.6	
Turnout		69,361	95.0	
Two-party-preferred result
Labor	Laurie Wallis		53.4	+3.4
Liberal	Brian Fitzgerald		46.6	−3.4
Labor hold		Swing	+3.4	

=== Hawker ===
This section is an excerpt from Electoral results for the Division of Hawker § 1980

1980 Australian federal election: Hawker
Party	Candidate	Votes	%	±%
Labor	Ralph Jacobi	34,066	49.4	+4.6
Liberal	Mark Hanckel	29,187	42.3	−1.7
Democrats	Kenneth Johnson	5,720	8.3	−1.9
Total formal votes		68,973	97.7	
Informal votes		1,590	2.3	
Turnout		70,563	94.7	
Two-party-preferred result
Labor	Ralph Jacobi	37,073	53.8	+3.2
Liberal	Mark Hanckel	31,900	46.2	−3.2
Labor hold		Swing	+3.2	

=== Hindmarsh ===
This section is an excerpt from Electoral results for the Division of Hindmarsh § 1980

1980 Australian federal election: Hindmarsh
Party	Candidate	Votes	%	±%
Labor	John Scott	34,106	48.0	−7.2
Liberal	George Basisovs	27,379	38.5	+6.0
Democrats	Peter Gagliardi	6,535	9.2	−3.0
Socialist Workers	Therese Doyle	1,531	2.2	+2.2
Independent	Alf Gard	1,500	2.1	+2.1
Total formal votes		71,051	96.1	
Informal votes		2,891	3.9	
Turnout		73,942	95.1	
Two-party-preferred result
Labor	John Scott		56.2	−5.1
Liberal	George Basisovs		43.8	+5.1
Labor hold		Swing	−5.1	

=== Kingston ===
This section is an excerpt from Electoral results for the Division of Kingston § 1980

1980 Australian federal election: Kingston
Party	Candidate	Votes	%	±%
Liberal	Grant Chapman	35,069	46.3	+1.0
Labor	Richard Gun	33,822	44.7	+2.8
Democrats	Judith Jenkins	6,813	9.0	−3.8
Total formal votes		75,704	98.1	
Informal votes		1,485	1.9	
Turnout		77,189	95.8	
Two-party-preferred result
Liberal	Grant Chapman	38,034	50.2	−1.6
Labor	Richard Gun	37,670	49.8	+1.6
Liberal hold		Swing	−1.6	

=== Port Adelaide ===
This section is an excerpt from Electoral results for the Division of Port Adelaide § 1980

1980 Australian federal election: Port Adelaide
Party	Candidate	Votes	%	±%
Labor	Mick Young	43,746	63.0	+3.0
Liberal	Shirley de Garis	19,580	28.2	−2.2
Democrats	Robert Manhire	4,846	7.0	−0.3
Communist	Elliott Johnston	1,261	1.8	−0.5
Total formal votes		69,433	96.1	
Informal votes		2,837	3.9	
Turnout		72,270	94.9	
Two-party-preferred result
Labor	Mick Young		68.8	+3.1
Liberal	Shirley de Garis		31.2	−3.1
Labor hold		Swing	+3.1	

=== Sturt ===
This section is an excerpt from Electoral results for the Division of Sturt § 1980

1980 Australian federal election: Sturt
Party	Candidate	Votes	%	±%
Liberal	Ian Wilson	37,018	50.9	−0.1
Labor	Andrew Dunstan	29,457	40.5	−0.1
Democrats	David d'Angelo	5,903	8.1	−5.4
Progressive Conservative	Colin Wuttke	354	0.5	+0.5
Total formal votes		72,732	97.5	
Informal votes		1,902	2.5	
Turnout		74,634	95.2	
Two-party-preferred result
Liberal	Ian Wilson		54.0	−3.3
Labor	Andrew Dunstan		46.0	+3.3
Liberal hold		Swing	−3.3	

=== Wakefield ===
This section is an excerpt from Electoral results for the Division of Wakefield § 1980

1980 Australian federal election: Wakefield
Party	Candidate	Votes	%	±%
Liberal	Geoffrey Giles	41,934	59.8	−2.1
Labor	Alan Reid	20,308	29.0	−0.9
Democrats	Rowland Beech	5,971	8.5	+0.3
National Country	Duncan Rose	1,901	2.7	+2.7
Total formal votes		70,144	97.3	
Informal votes		1,944	2.7	
Turnout		72,058	95.6	
Two-party-preferred result
Liberal	Geoffrey Giles		66.2	+0.2
Labor	Alan Reid		33.8	−0.2
Liberal hold		Swing	+0.2	

== Western Australia ==
1980 Australian federal election (Western Australia)
← 1977	18 October 1980	1983 →

All 11 WA seats in the House of Representatives 5 seats needed for a majority
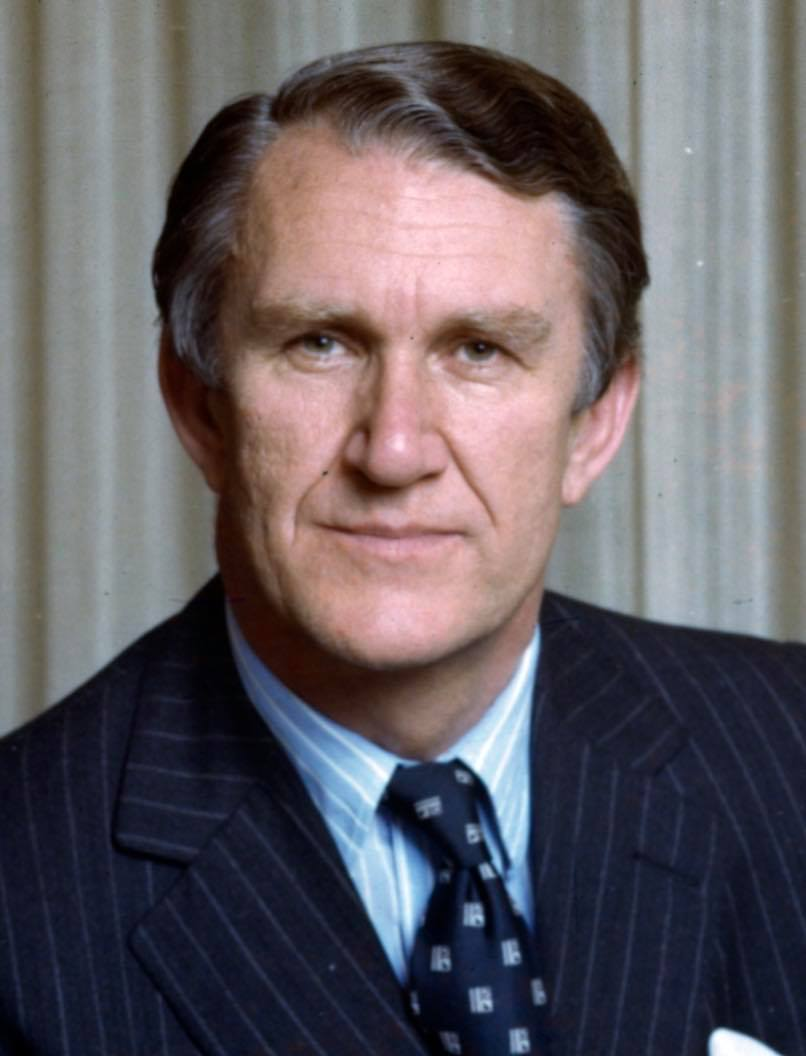

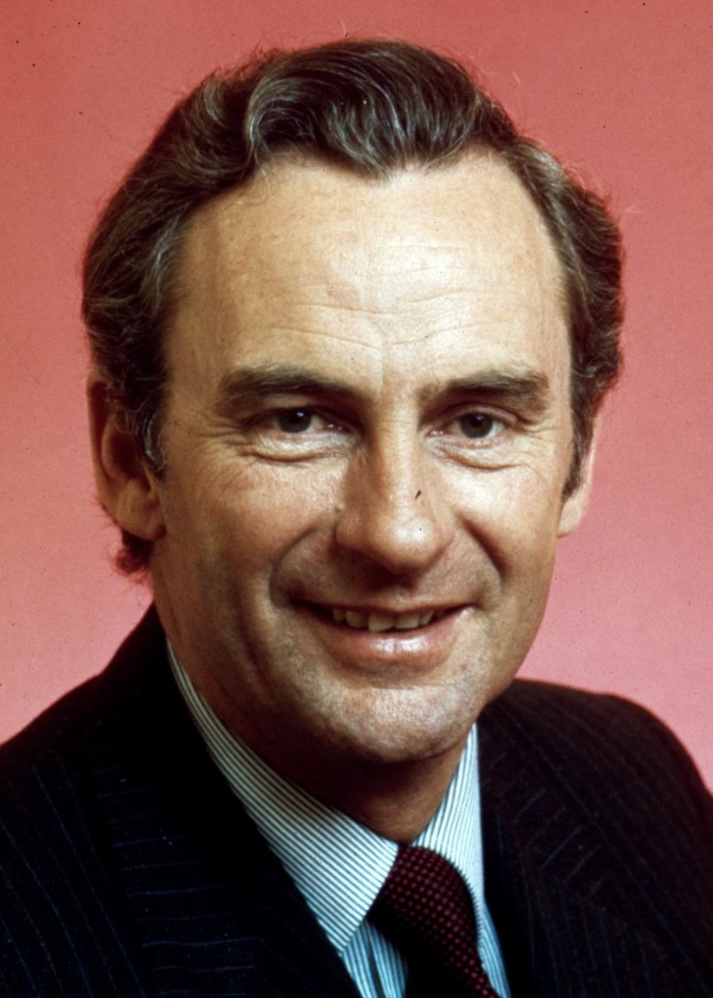
	First party	Second party
Leader	Malcolm Fraser	Bill Hayden
Party	Coalition	Labor
Seats before	9	1
Seats won	8	3
Seat change	▼1	▲2
Popular vote	342,388	286,259
Percentage	50.2%	42.0%
Swing	▼1.5pp	▲9.2pp
TPP	53.3%	46.7%
TPP swing	▼6.8pp	▲6.8pp

=== Canning ===
This section is an excerpt from Electoral results for the Division of Canning § 1980

1980 Australian federal election: Canning
Party	Candidate	Votes	%	±%
Liberal	Mel Bungey	31,821	47.3	+0.6
Labor	James Hansen	28,206	42.0	+13.6
Democrats	Theresa Cunningham	6,285	9.4	−0.7
Independent	Pamela Wells	896	1.3	+1.3
Total formal votes		67,208	97.3	
Informal votes		1,839	2.7	
Turnout		69,047	94.1	
Two-party-preferred result
Liberal	Mel Bungey	34,806	51.8	−13.0
Labor	James Hansen	32,402	48.2	+13.0
Liberal hold		Swing	−13.0	

=== Curtin ===
This section is an excerpt from Electoral results for the Division of Curtin § 1980

1980 Australian federal election: Curtin
Party	Candidate	Votes	%	±%
Liberal	Victor Garland	35,373	58.9	+0.1
Labor	Richard Grounds	19,680	32.8	+8.4
Democrats	Gary Payne	4,985	8.3	−6.1
Total formal votes		60,038	97.8	
Informal votes		1,321	2.2	
Turnout		61,359	93.0	
Two-party-preferred result
Liberal	Victor Garland		62.3	−6.5
Labor	Richard Grounds		37.7	+6.5
Liberal hold		Swing	−6.5	

=== Forrest ===
This section is an excerpt from Electoral results for the Division of Forrest § 1980

1980 Australian federal election: Forrest
Party	Candidate	Votes	%	±%
Liberal	Peter Drummond	31,005	51.3	+4.4
Labor	Walter MacMillan	21,749	36.0	+6.7
Democrats	Alfred Bussell	4,206	7.0	+0.0
National Country	Francis Timms	3,468	5.7	−7.2
Total formal votes		60,428	97.3	
Informal votes		1,663	2.7	
Turnout		62,091	94.0	
Two-party-preferred result
Liberal	Peter Drummond		59.8	−4.4
Labor	Walter MacMillan		40.2	+4.4
Liberal hold		Swing	−4.4	

=== Fremantle ===
This section is an excerpt from Electoral results for the Division of Fremantle § 1980

1980 Australian federal election: Fremantle
Party	Candidate	Votes	%	±%
Labor	John Dawkins	36,272	58.1	+8.5
Liberal	Donald McLeod	21,425	34.3	−2.8
Democrats	Graham Hull	3,791	6.1	−3.8
Socialist Workers	Angelo Lopez	915	1.5	+1.5
Total formal votes		62,403	96.9	
Informal votes		1,982	3.1	
Turnout		64,385	94.0	
Two-party-preferred result
Labor	John Dawkins		63.1	+6.8
Liberal	Donald McLeod		36.9	−6.8
Labor hold		Swing	+6.8	

=== Kalgoorlie ===
This section is an excerpt from Electoral results for the Division of Kalgoorlie § 1980

1980 Australian federal election: Kalgoorlie
Party	Candidate	Votes	%	±%
Liberal	Mick Cotter	26,562	46.5	−1.8
Labor	Graeme Campbell	25,845	45.2	+6.8
Democrats	Trevor Butler	4,723	8.3	+2.0
Total formal votes		57,130	97.6	
Informal votes		1,419	2.4	
Turnout		58,549	87.7	
Two-party-preferred result
Labor	Graeme Campbell	28,889	50.6	+8.1
Liberal	Mick Cotter	28,241	49.4	−8.1
Labor gain from Liberal		Swing	+8.1	

=== Moore ===
This section is an excerpt from Electoral results for the Division of Moore § 1980

1980 Australian federal election: Moore
Party	Candidate	Votes	%	±%
Liberal	John Hyde	31,021	47.0	+3.2
Labor	Allen Blanchard	28,267	42.9	+15.1
Democrats	Donald McComish	5,152	7.8	−4.4
National Country	Gladwin Wood	1,506	2.3	−9.9
Total formal votes		65,946	97.5	
Informal votes		1,658	2.5	
Turnout		67,604	94.1	
Two-party-preferred result
Liberal	John Hyde	34,852	52.8	−11.1
Labor	Allen Blanchard	31,094	47.2	+11.1
Liberal hold		Swing	−11.1	

=== O'Connor ===
This section is an excerpt from Electoral results for the Division of O'Connor § 1980

1980 Australian federal election: O'Connor
Party	Candidate	Votes	%	±%
Liberal	Wilson Tuckey	23,998	40.3	−6.5
Labor	Robert Duncannon	13,814	23.2	+5.0
National Country	Anthony Hassell	10,863	18.2	−8.0
National	Eric Charlton	8,915	15.0	+15.0
Democrats	Guy Wroth	1,994	3.3	−2.0
Total formal votes		59,584	96.7	
Informal votes		2,041	3.3	
Turnout		61,625	94.2	
Two-candidate-preferred result
Liberal	Wilson Tuckey	37,249	62.5	−2.7
National Country	Anthony Hassell	22,335	37.5	+2.7
Liberal notional hold		Swing	−2.7	

=== Perth ===
This section is an excerpt from Electoral results for the Division of Perth § 1980

1980 Australian federal election: Perth
Party	Candidate	Votes	%	±%
Liberal	Ross McLean	29,131	48.2	−2.6
Labor	William Delaney	27,599	45.7	+10.4
Democrats	Robert Foster	3,112	5.2	−4.6
Progressive Conservative	June Steen-Olsen	551	0.9	+0.9
Total formal votes		60,403	97.0	
Informal votes		1,843	3.0	
Turnout		62,246	93.0	
Two-party-preferred result
Liberal	Ross McLean	30,807	51.0	−8.5
Labor	William Delaney	29,596	49.0	+8.5
Liberal hold		Swing	−8.5	

=== Stirling ===
This section is an excerpt from Electoral results for the Division of Stirling § 1980

1980 Australian federal election: Stirling
Party	Candidate	Votes	%	±%
Liberal	Ian Viner	30,307	48.9	−1.3
Labor	Richard Pitts	26,135	42.2	+10.1
Democrats	Jean Jenkins	4,242	6.8	−8.0
Independent	Roger Broinowski	1,301	2.1	+2.1
Total formal votes		61,985	97.3	
Informal votes		1,716	2.7	
Turnout		63,701	94.2	
Two-party-preferred result
Liberal	Ian Viner	32,206	52.0	−7.7
Labor	Richard Pitts	29,779	48.0	+7.7
Liberal hold		Swing	−7.7	

=== Swan ===
This section is an excerpt from Electoral results for the Division of Swan § 1980

1980 Australian federal election: Swan
Party	Candidate	Votes	%	±%
Labor	Kim Beazley	32,476	53.3	+13.7
Liberal	John Martyr	24,401	40.1	−2.8
Democrats	Jean Ritter	3,288	5.4	−6.4
Socialist Workers	Stephen Painter	750	1.2	+1.2
Total formal votes		60,915	97.1	
Informal votes		1,790	2.9	
Turnout		62,705	93.3	
Two-party-preferred result
Labor	Kim Beazley		57.6	+8.1
Liberal	John Martyr		42.4	−8.1
Labor gain from Liberal		Swing	+8.1	

=== Tangney ===
This section is an excerpt from Electoral results for the Division of Tangney § 1980

1980 Australian federal election: Tangney
Party	Candidate	Votes	%	±%
Liberal	Peter Shack	32,592	50.1	−0.1
Labor	Maureen Wong	26,216	40.3	+8.6
Democrats	Robert McCormack	6,288	9.7	−4.8
Total formal votes		65,096	97.7	
Informal votes		1,549	2.3	
Turnout		66,645	94.3	
Two-party-preferred result
Liberal	Peter Shack		54.6	−5.3
Labor	Maureen Wong		45.4	+5.3
Liberal hold		Swing	−5.3	

== Tasmania ==
1980 Australian federal election (Tasmania)
← 1977	18 October 1980	1983 →

All 5 Tasmanian seats in the House of Representatives 3 seats needed for a majority
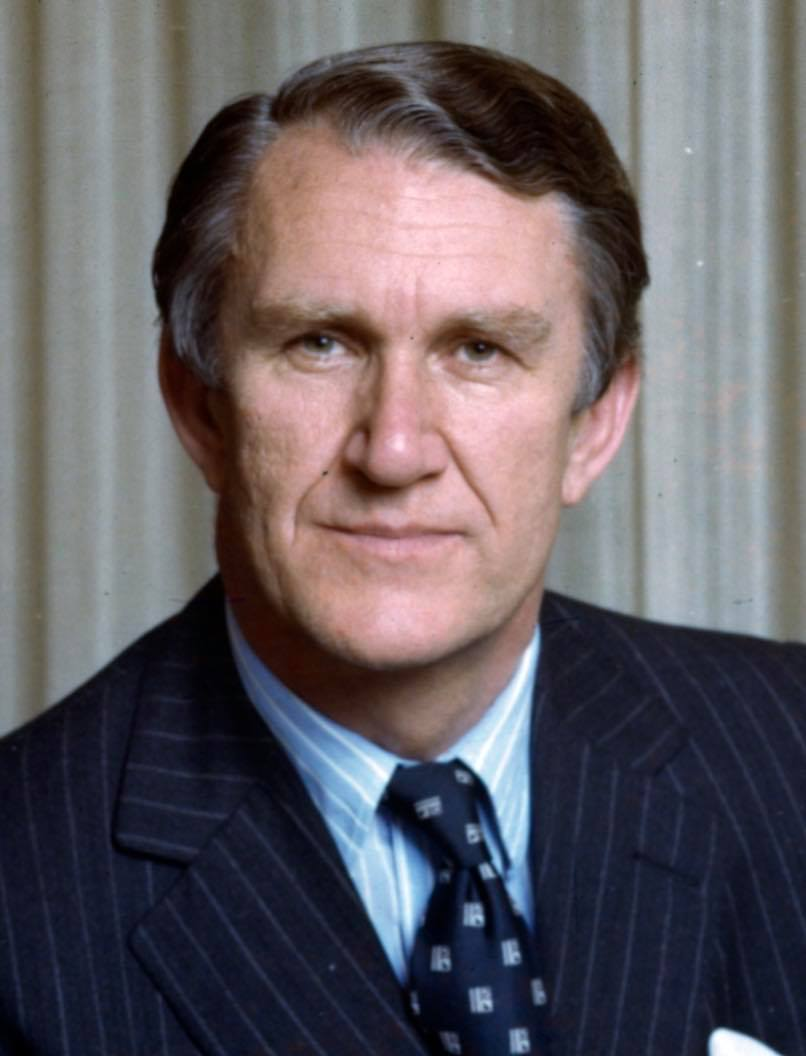

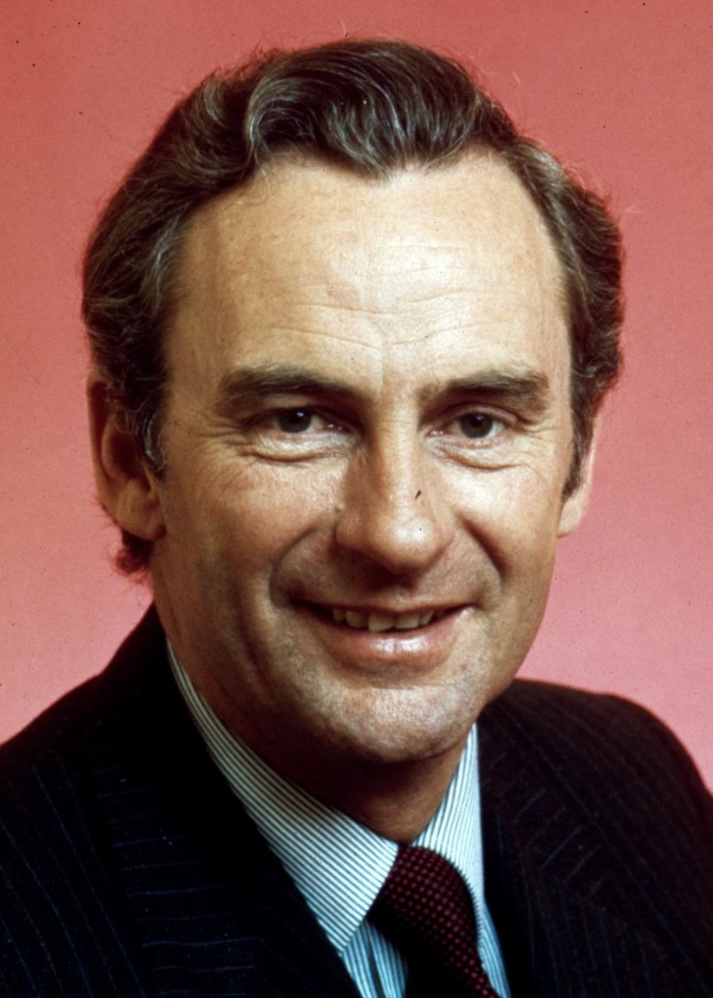
	First party	Second party
Leader	Malcolm Fraser	Bill Hayden
Party	Coalition	Labor
Seats before	5	0
Seats won	5	0
Seat change	Steady	Steady
Popular vote	133,144	118,336
Percentage	51.9%	46.1%
Swing	▼2.7pp	▲4.2pp
TPP	52.9%	47.1%
TPP swing	▼3.3pp	▲3.3pp

=== Bass ===
This section is an excerpt from Electoral results for the Division of Bass § 1980

1980 Australian federal election: Bass
Party	Candidate	Votes	%	±%
Liberal	Kevin Newman	27,586	53.0	−2.7
Labor	Patti Warn	23,199	44.5	+7.8
Independent	Olga Scully	1,310	2.5	+2.5
Total formal votes		52,095	97.5	
Informal votes		1,320	2.5	
Turnout		53,415	96.7	
Two-party-preferred result
Liberal	Kevin Newman		54.3	−5.7
Labor	Patti Warn		45.7	+5.7
Liberal hold		Swing	−5.7	

=== Braddon ===
This section is an excerpt from Electoral results for the Division of Braddon § 1980

1980 Australian federal election: Braddon
Party	Candidate	Votes	%	±%
Liberal	Ray Groom	27,307	55.1	−3.1
Labor	Lance Fee	22,275	44.9	+3.1
Total formal votes		49,582	97.1	
Informal votes		1,496	2.9	
Turnout		51,078	94.8	
Liberal hold		Swing	−3.1	

=== Denison ===
This section is an excerpt from Electoral results for the Division of Denison § 1980

1980 Australian federal election: Denison
Party	Candidate	Votes	%	±%
Liberal	Michael Hodgman	25,751	50.2	−0.7
Labor	Ken Wriedt	23,538	45.9	+1.2
Democrats	Peter Creet	1,998	3.9	−0.5
Total formal votes		51,287	97.5	
Informal votes		1,340	2.5	
Turnout		52,627	96.6	
Two-party-preferred result
Liberal	Michael Hodgman		52.4	−0.7
Labor	Ken Wriedt		47.6	+0.7
Liberal hold		Swing	−0.7	

=== Franklin ===
This section is an excerpt from Electoral results for the Division of Franklin § 1980

1980 Australian federal election: Franklin
Party	Candidate	Votes	%	±%
Liberal	Bruce Goodluck	26,893	51.3	−3.4
Labor	Fran Bladel	23,809	45.4	+0.1
Democrats	John Thomson	1,734	3.3	+3.3
Total formal votes		52,436	97.6	
Informal votes		1,264	2.4	
Turnout		53,700	96.9	
Two-party-preferred result
Liberal	Bruce Goodluck		52.7	−2.0
Labor	Fran Bladel		47.3	+2.0
Liberal hold		Swing	−2.0	

=== Wilmot ===
This section is an excerpt from Electoral results for the Division of Wilmot § 1980

1980 Australian federal election: Wilmot
Party	Candidate	Votes	%	±%
Liberal	Max Burr	25,607	50.1	−3.5
Labor	David Llewellyn	25,515	49.9	+3.5
Total formal votes		51,122	97.1	
Informal votes		1,547	2.9	
Turnout		52,699	96.7	
Liberal hold		Swing	−5.7	

== Australian Capital Territory ==
1980 Australian federal election (Australian Capital Territory)
← 1977	18 October 1980	1983 →

All 3 ACT seats in the House of Representatives 2 seats needed for a majority
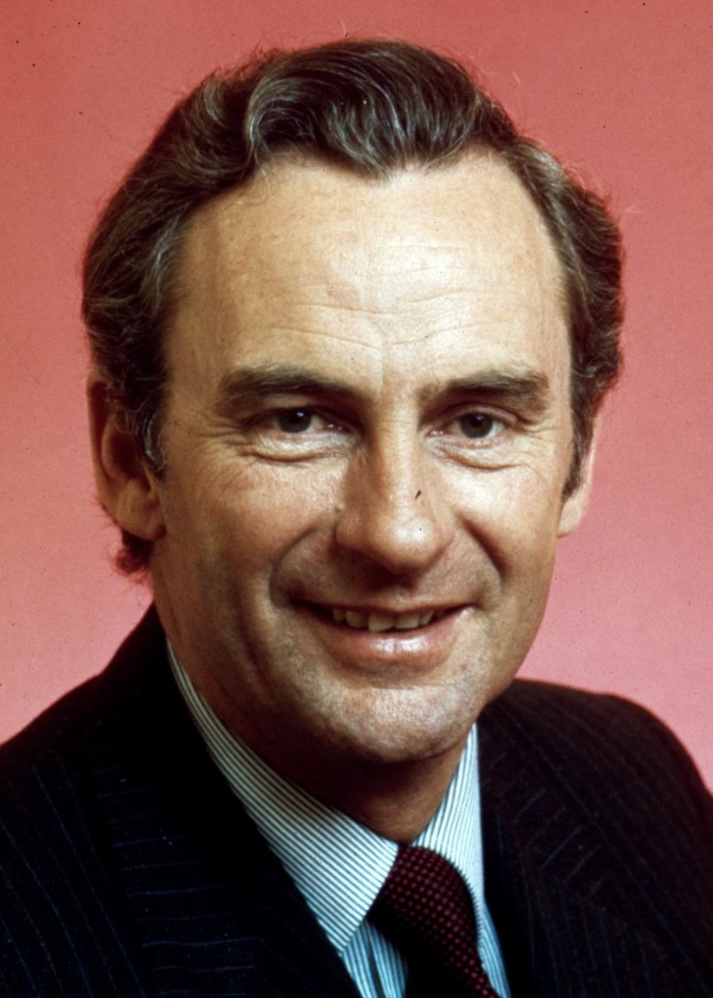

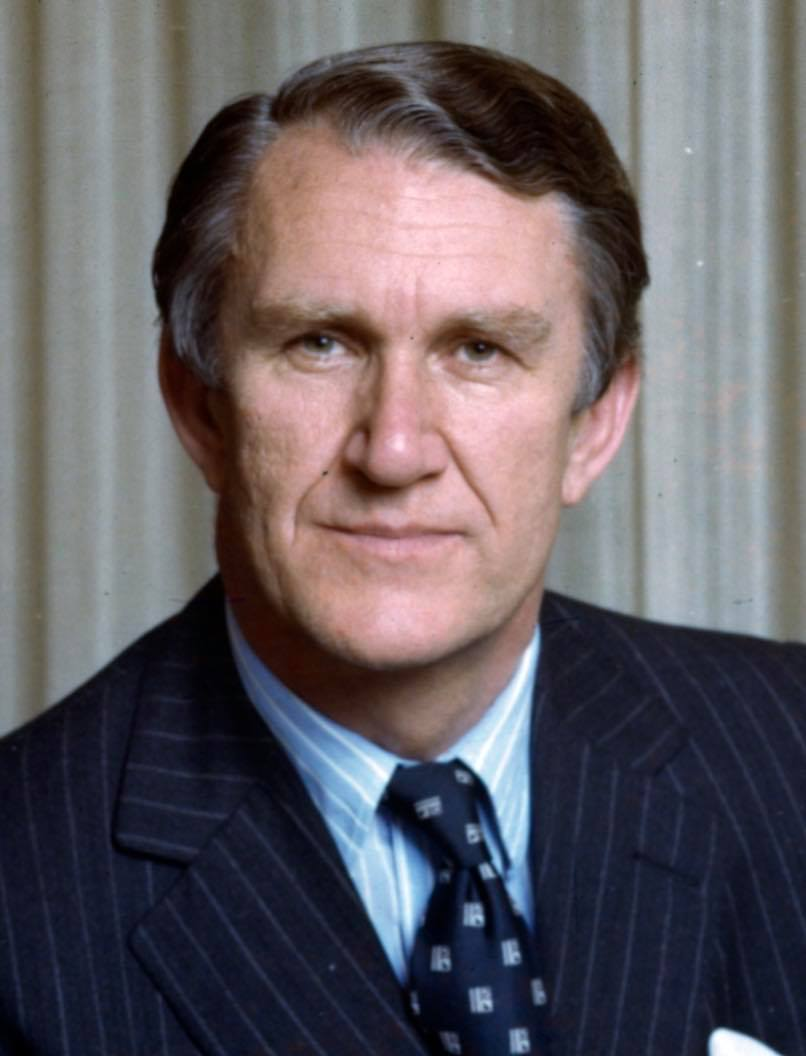
	First party	Second party
Leader	Bill Hayden	Malcolm Fraser
Party	Labor	Coalition
Seats before	1	1
Seats won	2	0
Seat change	▲1	▼1
Popular vote	68,916	48,016
Percentage	53.73%	37.43%
Swing	▲4.69pp	▼3.04pp
TPP	58.60%	41.40%
TPP swing	▲4.30pp	▼4.30pp

=== Canberra ===
This section is an excerpt from Electoral results for the Division of Canberra § 1980

1980 Australian federal election: Canberra
Party	Candidate	Votes	%	±%
Labor	Ros Kelly	32,352	52.4	+11.6
Liberal	John Haslem	25,957	42.1	−1.1
Democrats	Leo Nesic	2,845	4.6	−10.4
Independent	Kevin Wise	574	0.9	+0.9
Total formal votes		61,728	98.1	
Informal votes		1,215	1.9	
Turnout		62,943	94.9	
Two-party-preferred result
Labor	Ros Kelly		55.7	+6.7
Liberal	John Haslem		44.3	−6.7
Labor gain from Liberal		Swing	+6.7	

=== Fraser ===
This section is an excerpt from Electoral results for the Division of Fraser (Australian Capital Territory) § 1980

1980 Australian federal election: Fraser
Party	Candidate	Votes	%	±%
Labor	Ken Fry	36,564	57.3	−2.1
Liberal	Michael Yabsley	22,059	34.6	−6.0
Democrats	Dimmen de Graaff	4,156	6.5	+6.5
Independent	Kevin Wise	636	1.0	+1.0
Independent	Basil Yakimov	367	0.6	+0.6
Total formal votes		63,782	97.6	
Informal votes		1,537	2.4	
Turnout		65,319	93.8	
Two-party-preferred result
Labor	Ken Fry		62.5	+3.1
Liberal	Michael Yabsley		37.5	−3.1
Labor hold		Swing	+3.1	

== Northern Territory ==
1980 Australian federal election (Northern Territory)
← 1977	18 October 1980	1983 →

Division of Northern Territory
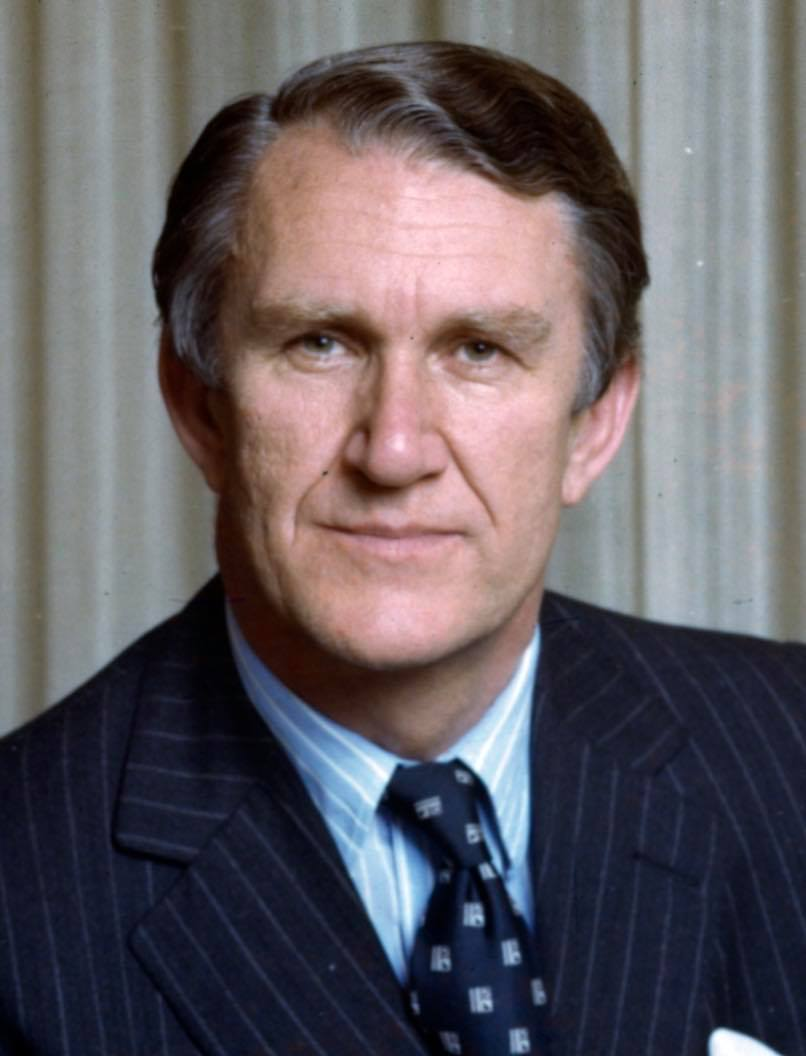

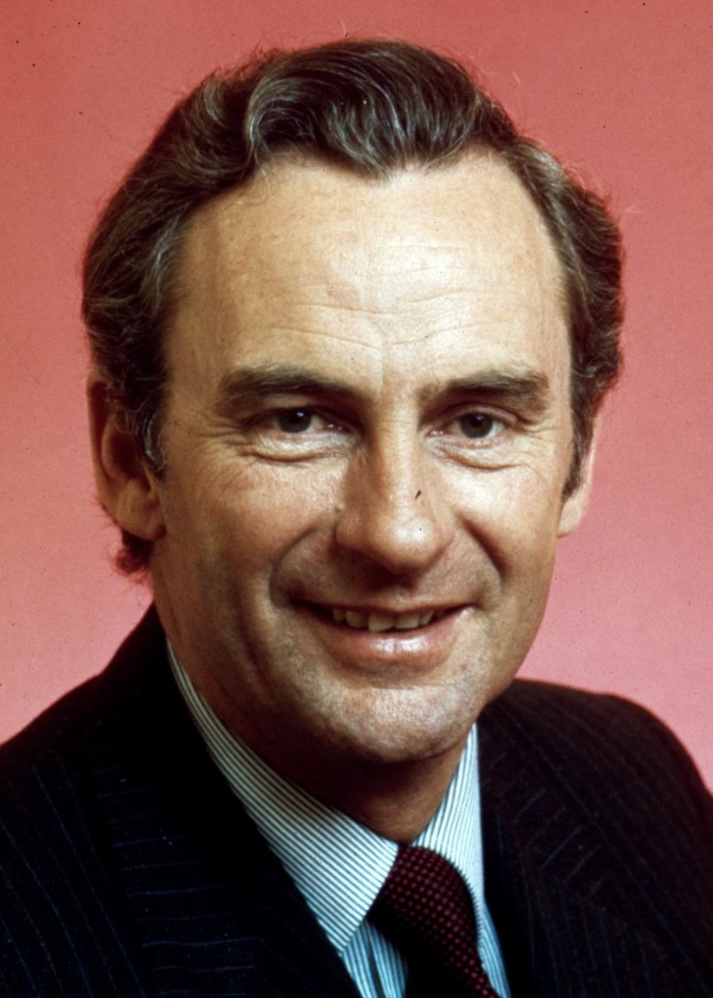
	First party	Second party
Leader	Malcolm Fraser	Bill Hayden
Party	Coalition	Labor
Seats before	1	0
Seats won	1	0
Seat change	Steady	Steady
Popular vote	18,805	17,426
Percentage	43.6%	40.4%
Swing	▼3.8pp	▼2.2pp
TPP	51.2%	48.8%
TPP swing	▼1.3pp	▲1.3pp

This section is an excerpt from Electoral results for the Division of Northern Territory § 1980

1980 Australian federal election: Northern Territory
Party	Candidate	Votes	%	±%
Country Liberal	Grant Tambling	18,805	43.6	−3.8
Labor	John Waters	17,426	40.4	−2.2
Democrats	Max Stewart	2,509	5.8	−1.3
Independent	Galarrwuy Yunupingu	2,415	5.6	+5.6
Independent	Pamela Gardiner	1,129	2.6	+2.6
Marijuana	Graham Gillian	486	1.1	+1.1
Christian Democrat	John McElroy	272	0.6	+0.6
Independent	Malcolm Womersley	130	0.3	+0.3
Total formal votes		43,172	95.1	
Informal votes		2,231	4.9	
Turnout		45,403	82.3	
Two-party-preferred result
Country Liberal	Grant Tambling	22,090	51.2	−1.3
Labor	John Waters	21,082	48.8	+1.3
Country Liberal hold		Swing	−1.3	

== See also ==
- Post-election pendulum for the 1980 Australian federal election
- Candidates of the 1980 Australian federal election
- Members of the Australian House of Representatives, 1980–1983
- Results of the 1980 Australian federal election (Senate)
