= Post-election pendulum for the 1980 Australian federal election =

The Mackerras pendulum as a way of predicting the outcome of an election contested between two major parties in a Westminster style lower house legislature such as the Australian House of Representatives, which is composed of single-member electorates and which uses a preferential voting system such as a Condorcet method or instant-runoff voting.

The pendulum works by lining up all of the seats held in Parliament for the government, the opposition and the crossbenches according to the percentage point margin they are held by on a two party preferred basis. This is also known as the swing required for the seat to change hands. Given a uniform swing to the opposition or government parties, the number of seats that change hands can be predicted.

Government seats (74)
Marginal
Wilmot	Tas	Max Burr	LIB	0.1
Kingston	SA	Grant Chapman	LIB	0.2
Barton	NSW	Jim Bradfield	LIB	0.4
Riverina	NSW	Noel Hicks	NCP	0.5
Phillip	NSW	Jack Birney	LIB	0.6
Herbert	Qld	Gordon Dean	LIB	0.9
Perth	WA	Ross McLean	LIB	1.0
Lowe	NSW	William McMahon	LIB	1.1
Leichhardt	Qld	David Thomson	NCP	1.1
Bowman	Qld	David Jull	LIB	1.2
Northern Territory	NT	Grant Tambling	CLP	1.2
Bendigo	Vic	John Bourchier	LIB	1.3
Calare	NSW	Sandy Mackenzie	NCP	1.5
Fadden	Qld	Don Cameron	LIB	1.5
Canning	WA	Mel Bungey	LIB	1.8
Casey	Vic	Peter Falconer	LIB	1.9
Stirling	WA	Ian Viner	LIB	2.0
Chisholm	Vic	Graham Harris	LIB	2.2
Dawson	Qld	Ray Braithwaite	NCP	2.2
Deakin	Vic	Alan Jarman	LIB	2.3
Denison	Tas	Michael Hodgman	LIB	2.4
Franklin	Tas	Bruce Goodluck	LIB	2.7
Eden-Monaro	NSW	Murray Sainsbury	LIB	2.8
Moore	WA	John Hyde	LIB	2.8
Macarthur	NSW	Michael Baume	LIB	3.2
Petrie	Qld	John Hodges	LIB	3.4
McPherson	Qld	Eric Robinson	LIB	3.6
Diamond Valley	Vic	Neil Brown	LIB	3.7
Sturt	SA	Ian Wilson	LIB	4.0
Bass	Tas	Kevin Newman	LIB	4.3
Wide Bay	Qld	Clarrie Millar	NCP	4.4
Flinders	Vic	Phillip Lynch	LIB	4.6
Moreton	Qld	James Killen	LIB	4.6
Tangney	WA	Peter Shack	LIB	4.6
Cook	NSW	Don Dobie	LIB	5.1
Braddon	Tas	Ray Groom	LIB	5.1
Bruce	Vic	Billy Snedden	LIB	5.4
Fairly safe
Balaclava	Vic	Ian Macphee	LIB	6.1
Cowper	NSW	Ian Robinson	NCP	6.5
New England	NSW	Ian Sinclair	NCP	6.5
Hume	NSW	Stephen Lusher	NCP	6.9
Barker	SA	James Porter	LIB	7.5
Paterson	NSW	Frank O'Keefe	NCP	7.7
Bennelong	NSW	John Howard	LIB	8.4
Dundas	NSW	Philip Ruddock	LIB	8.4
Lyne	NSW	Bruce Cowan	NCP	8.9
Fisher	Qld	Evan Adermann	NCP	8.9
Forrest	WA	Peter Drummond	LIB	9.8
Safe
Richmond	NSW	Doug Anthony	NCP	10.3
Gwydir	NSW	Ralph Hunt	NCP	10.4
Ryan	Qld	John Moore	LIB	10.4
Higgins	Vic	Roger Shipton	LIB	10.7
Kooyong	Vic	Andrew Peacock	LIB	11.1
Wannon	Vic	Malcolm Fraser	LIB	11.2
Farrer	NSW	Wal Fife	LIB	11.8
Gippsland	Vic	Peter Nixon	NCP	11.9
Curtin	WA	Victor Garland	LIB	12.3
Indi	Vic	Ewen Cameron	LIB	12.4
O'Connor	WA	Wilson Tuckey	LIB	12.5 v NCP
Boothby	SA	John McLeay Jr.	LIB	12.6
Kennedy	Qld	Bob Katter Sr.	NCP	12.7
Corangamite	Vic	Tony Street	LIB	12.8
Wentworth	NSW	Bob Ellicott	LIB	13.0
Mackellar	NSW	Jim Carlton	LIB	13.5
North Sydney	NSW	John Spender	LIB	14.5
Berowra	NSW	Harry Edward	LIB	15.0
Mitchell	NSW	Alan Cadman	LIB	15.6
Darling Downs	Qld	Tom McVeigh	NCP	15.8
Wakefield	SA	Geoffrey Giles	LIB	16.2
Maranoa	Qld	Ian Cameron	NCP	17.1
Warringah	NSW	Michael MacKellar	LIB	17.4
Murray	Vic	Bruce Lloyd	NCP	17.5
Very safe
Mallee	Vic	Peter Fisher	NCP	20.8
Bradfield	NSW	David Connolly	LIB	28.1

Opposition seats (51)
Marginal
Kalgoorlie	WA	Graeme Campbell	ALP	0.6
Ballarat	Vic	John Mildren	ALP	0.7
Lilley	Qld	Elaine Darling	ALP	0.8
McMillan	Vic	Barry Cunningham	ALP	1.4
Isaacs	Vic	David Charles	ALP	1.8
Brisbane	Qld	Manfred Cross	ALP	1.8
La Trobe	Vic	Peter Milton	ALP	2.3
Macquarie	NSW	Ross Free	ALP	2.8
Henty	Vic	Joan Child	ALP	2.8
Grey	SA	Laurie Wallis	ALP	3.4
Hawker	SA	Ralph Jacobi	ALP	3.8
Hotham	Vic	Lewis Kent	ALP	4.0
Capricornia	Qld	Doug Everingham	ALP	4.3
Canberra	ACT	Ros Kelly	ALP	5.7
Fairly safe
St George	NSW	Bill Morrison	ALP	6.1
Hindmarsh	SA	John Scott	ALP	6.2
Holt	Vic	Michael Duffy	ALP	6.9
Swan	WA	Kim Beazley	ALP	7.6
Robertson	NSW	Barry Cohen	ALP	8.1
Adelaide	SA	Chris Hurford	ALP	8.5
Banks	NSW	John Mountford	ALP	8.8
Burke	Vic	Andrew Theophanous	ALP	8.8
Corio	Vic	Gordon Scholes	ALP	9.8
Safe
Parramatta	NSW	John Brown	ALP	10.2
Batman	Vic	Brian Howe	ALP	10.7
Maribyrnong	Vic	Moss Cass	ALP	10.7
Prospect	NSW	Dick Klugman	ALP	11.2
Hughes	NSW	Les Johnson	ALP	12.1
Melbourne Ports	Vic	Clyde Holding	ALP	12.3
Bonython	SA	Neal Blewitt	ALP	12.4
Fraser	ACT	Ken Fry	ALP	12.5
Griffith	Qld	Ben Humphreys	ALP	12.5
Fremantle	WA	John Dawkins	ALP	13.1
Grayndler	NSW	Leo McLeay	ALP	13.5
Newcastle	NSW	Charles Jones	ALP	13.8
Cunningham	NSW	Stewart West	ALP	15.1
Reid	NSW	Tom Uren	ALP	15.5
Werriwa	NSW	John Kerin	ALP	16.6
Blaxland	NSW	Paul Keating	ALP	17.2
Melbourne	Vic	Ted Innes	ALP	18.1
Oxley	Qld	Bill Hayden	ALP	18.8
Port Adelaide	SA	Mick Young	ALP	18.8
Shortland	NSW	Peter Morris	ALP	19.3
Wills	Vic	Bob Hawke	ALP	19.9
Very safe
Chifley	NSW	John Armitage	ALP	20.1
Scullin	Vic	Harry Jenkins, Sr.	ALP	20.6
Hunter	NSW	Bob Brown	ALP	21.3
Kingsford Smith	NSW	Lionel Bowen	ALP	21.5
Lalor	Vic	Barry Jones	ALP	21.9
Gellibrand	Vic	Ralph Willis	ALP	23.4
Sydney	NSW	Les McMahon	ALP	23.8
