= Patti Warn =

Patricia Pauline "Patti" Warn (born 17 August 1944) is a former Australian trade unionist and political staffer. She was the first female president of the Tasmanian branch of the Australian Labor Party (1976–80).

Warn was born in Hobart to Les Warn and Pauline, née Parker. She attended St Michael's Collegiate School in Hobart, and graduated from the University of Tasmania with a Bachelor of Arts in 1965. From 1966 to 1967 she was education vice-president and deputy president of the National Union of Australian University Students before becoming a research officer for the ABC's Four Corners program. In 1973 she was appointed private secretary to the federal Minister for External Territories before being shifted to the Prime Minister's office as Gough Whitlam's media secretary in 1974. Following the Labor Party's defeat in 1975, she became the first female state secretary of the Tasmanian ALP, serving until 1980 when she became assistant private secretary to Senator Don Grimes. In that year she also assumed the position of vice-president of the YWCA of Canberra. She was the Labor candidate for Bass in 1980, but was unsuccessful.
