= Electoral results for the Division of Darling Downs =

Australian division election results

This is a list of electoral results for the Division of Darling Downs in Australian federal elections from the division's creation in 1901 until its abolition in 1983.

== Members ==
Member	Party	Term
William Henry Groom	Protectionist	1901–1901
(Sir) Littleton Groom	Protectionist	1901–1909
(Sir) Littleton Groom	Liberal	1909–1916
(Sir) Littleton Groom	Nationalist	1916–1929
(Sir) Littleton Groom	Independent Nationalist	1929–1929
Arthur Morgan	Nationalist	1929–1931
Sir Littleton Groom	Independent	1931–1933
Sir Littleton Groom	United Australia	1933–1936
Arthur Fadden	Country	1936–1949
(Sir) Reginald Swartz	Liberal	1949–1972
Tom McVeigh	Country, National	1972–1984

== Election results ==
=== Elections in the 1980s ===
==== 1983 ====
1983 Australian federal election: Darling Downs
Party	Candidate	Votes	%	±%
National	Tom McVeigh	42,627	61.7	−1.6
Labor	Ronald Cullin	22,524	32.6	+2.7
Democrats	David Groves	3,960	5.7	+0.2
Total formal votes		69,111	99.0	
Informal votes		715	1.0	
Turnout		69,826	93.9	
Two-party-preferred result
National	Tom McVeigh		64.0	−1.8
Labor	Ronald Cullin		36.0	+1.8
National hold		Swing	−1.8	

==== 1980 ====
1980 Australian federal election: Darling Downs
Party	Candidate	Votes	%	±%
National Country	Tom McVeigh	41,011	63.3	−4.8
Labor	Janet Hunt	19,379	29.9	+0.3
Democrats	Maria Hayboer	3,551	5.5	+5.5
Progress	David Proud	870	1.3	−1.1
Total formal votes		64,811	98.7	
Informal votes		850	1.3	
Turnout		65,661	94.8	
Two-party-preferred result
National Country	Tom McVeigh		65.8	−4.5
Labor	Janet Hunt		34.2	+4.5
National Country hold		Swing	−4.5	

=== Elections in the 1970s ===
==== 1977 ====
1977 Australian federal election: Darling Downs
Party	Candidate	Votes	%	±%
National Country	Tom McVeigh	42,630	68.1	+1.2
Labor	Robert Lingard	18,505	29.6	−3.5
Progress	David Proud	1,482	2.4	+2.4
Total formal votes		62,617	98.9	
Informal votes		677	1.1	
Turnout		63,294	94.8	
Two-party-preferred result
National Country	Tom McVeigh		70.3	+3.4
Labor	Robert Lingard		29.7	−3.4
National Country hold		Swing	+3.4	

==== 1975 ====
1975 Australian federal election: Darling Downs
Party	Candidate	Votes	%	±%
National Country	Tom McVeigh	42,133	69.4	+4.5
Labor	Peter Wood	18,590	30.6	−3.2
Total formal votes		60,723	99.0	
Informal votes		607	1.0	
Turnout		61,330	95.8	
National Country hold		Swing	+4.0	

==== 1974 ====
1974 Australian federal election: Darling Downs
Party	Candidate	Votes	%	±%
Country	Tom McVeigh	38,078	64.9	+32.6
Labor	Ronald Madden	19,860	33.8	−2.5
Australia	William Nobes	733	1.2	+1.2
Total formal votes		58,671	99.1	
Informal votes		556	0.9	
Turnout		59,227	95.7	
Two-party-preferred result
Country	Tom McVeigh		65.4	+6.6
Labor	Ronald Madden		34.6	−6.6
Country hold		Swing	+6.6	

==== 1972 ====
1972 Australian federal election: Darling Downs
Party	Candidate	Votes	%	±%
Labor	James Thomas	18,866	36.3	+3.8
Country	Tom McVeigh	16,783	32.3	+32.3
Liberal	Colin Brimblecombe	11,695	22.5	−35.0
Democratic Labor	Eugene Connolly	3,341	6.4	−3.6
Independent	Ronald Alford	1,312	2.5	+2.5
Total formal votes		51,997	98.3	
Informal votes		895	1.7	
Turnout		52,892	96.5	
Two-party-preferred result
Country	Tom McVeigh	31,875	61.3	+61.3
Labor	James Thomas	20,122	38.7	+3.4
Country gain from Liberal		Swing	−3.4	

=== Elections in the 1960s ===
==== 1969 ====
1969 Australian federal election: Darling Downs
Party	Candidate	Votes	%	±%
Liberal	Reginald Swartz	29,715	57.5	−2.3
Labor	Eugene Salas	16,785	32.5	+1.3
Democratic Labor	Francis Mullins	5,177	10.0	+1.0
Total formal votes		51,677	99.1	
Informal votes		480	0.9	
Turnout		52,157	95.9	
Two-party-preferred result
Liberal	Reginald Swartz		64.7	−3.7
Labor	Eugene Salas		35.3	+3.7
Liberal hold		Swing	−3.7	

==== 1966 ====
1966 Australian federal election: Darling Downs
Party	Candidate	Votes	%	±%
Liberal	Reginald Swartz	26,585	60.5	−0.7
Labor	Desmond Hare	13,413	30.5	−3.4
Democratic Labor	Francis Mullins	3,944	9.0	+4.1
Total formal votes		43,942	98.7	
Informal votes		573	1.3	
Turnout		44,515	96.9	
Two-party-preferred result
Liberal	Reginald Swartz		67.7	+2.6
Labor	Desmond Hare		32.3	−2.6
Liberal hold		Swing	+2.6	

==== 1963 ====
1963 Australian federal election: Darling Downs
Party	Candidate	Votes	%	±%
Liberal	Reginald Swartz	26,072	61.2	+10.2
Labor	Cyril Mitchell	14,418	33.9	−7.8
Democratic Labor	Kenneth Rawle	2,078	4.9	−2.5
Total formal votes		42,568	98.6	
Informal votes		589	1.4	
Turnout		43,157	97.0	
Two-party-preferred result
Liberal	Reginald Swartz		65.1	+8.2
Labor	Cyril Mitchell		34.9	−8.2
Liberal hold		Swing	+8.2	

==== 1961 ====
1961 Australian federal election: Darling Downs
Party	Candidate	Votes	%	±%
Liberal	Reginald Swartz	20,971	51.0	−5.5
Labor	Jack McCafferty	17,153	41.7	+7.4
Queensland Labor	Margaret Walsh	3,025	7.4	−1.9
Total formal votes		41,149	98.1	
Informal votes		803	1.9	
Turnout		41,952	97.3	
Two-party-preferred result
Liberal	Reginald Swartz		56.9	−7.0
Labor	Jack McCafferty		43.1	+7.0
Liberal hold		Swing	−7.0	

=== Elections in the 1950s ===
==== 1958 ====
1958 Australian federal election: Darling Downs
Party	Candidate	Votes	%	±%
Liberal	Reginald Swartz	22,469	56.5	−43.5
Labor	Jack McCafferty	13,623	34.3	+34.3
Queensland Labor	Margaret Walsh	3,680	9.3	+9.3
Total formal votes		39,772	98.2	
Informal votes		737	1.8	
Turnout		40,509	95.9	
Two-party-preferred result
Liberal	Reginald Swartz		63.9	−36.1
Labor	Jack McCafferty		36.1	+36.1
Liberal hold		Swing	−36.1	

==== 1955 ====
1955 Australian federal election: Darling Downs
Party	Candidate	Votes	%	±%
Liberal	Reginald Swartz	unopposed		
Liberal hold		Swing		

==== 1954 ====
1954 Australian federal election: Darling Downs
Party	Candidate	Votes	%	±%
Liberal	Reginald Swartz	24,801	65.0	−35.0
Labor	William Watson	13,331	35.0	+35.0
Total formal votes		38,132	99.3	
Informal votes		267	0.7	
Turnout		38,399	96.6	
Liberal hold		Swing	−35.0	

==== 1951 ====
1951 Australian federal election: Darling Downs
Party	Candidate	Votes	%	±%
Liberal	Reginald Swartz	unopposed		
Liberal hold		Swing		

=== Elections in the 1940s ===
==== 1949 ====
1949 Australian federal election: Darling Downs
Party	Candidate	Votes	%	±%
Liberal	Reginald Swartz	21,261	58.9	+58.9
Labor	James Kane	11,281	31.2	−5.0
Independent	Charles Farquharson	3,041	8.4	+8.4
Communist	Raymond Mullaly	281	0.8	+0.8
Independent	Charles Lacaze	260	0.7	+0.7
Total formal votes		36,124	98.4	
Informal votes		587	1.6	
Turnout		36,711	97.2	
Two-party-preferred result
Liberal	Reginald Swartz		62.5	+62.5
Labor	James Kane		37.5	−1.9
Liberal gain from Country		Swing	+1.9	

==== 1946 ====
1946 Australian federal election: Darling Downs
Party	Candidate	Votes	%	±%
Country	Arthur Fadden	31,550	59.9	+11.3
Labor	William English	17,902	34.0	−9.3
Services	Maxwell Owen	3,209	6.1	+6.1
Total formal votes		52,661	98.3	
Informal votes		901	1.7	
Turnout		53,562	96.2	
Two-party-preferred result
Country	Arthur Fadden		61.9	+9.4
Labor	William English		38.1	−9.4
Country hold		Swing	+9.4	

==== 1943 ====
1943 Australian federal election: Darling Downs
Party	Candidate	Votes	%	±%
Country	Arthur Fadden	26,123	48.6	−9.3
Labor	Leslie Bailey	23,253	43.3	+1.2
Independent	Raymond Mullaly	3,398	6.3	+6.3
One Parliament	Hugh Phair	989	1.8	+1.8
Total formal votes		53,763	98.4	
Informal votes		868	1.6	
Turnout		54,631	97.9	
Two-party-preferred result
Country	Arthur Fadden	28,232	52.5	−5.4
Labor	Leslie Bailey	25,531	47.5	+5.4
Country hold		Swing	−5.4	

==== 1940 ====
1940 Australian federal election: Darling Downs
Party	Candidate	Votes	%	±%
Country	Arthur Fadden	29,365	57.9	−2.8
Labor	Leslie Bailey	21,316	42.1	+8.0
Total formal votes		50,681	98.7	
Informal votes		675	1.3	
Turnout		51,356	97.0	
Country hold		Swing	−5.4	

=== Elections in the 1930s ===
==== 1937 ====
1937 Australian federal election: Darling Downs
Party	Candidate	Votes	%	±%
Country	Arthur Fadden	30,747	60.7	+60.7
Labor	Leslie Bailey	17,264	34.1	−5.1
Social Credit	Arthur Rushton	2,617	5.2	+5.2
Total formal votes		50,628	98.5	
Informal votes		784	1.5	
Turnout		51,412	97.7	
Two-party-preferred result
Country	Arthur Fadden		63.3	−2.5
Labor	Leslie Bailey		36.7	+2.5
Country hold		Swing	−2.5	

1936 Darling Downs by-election
Party	Candidate	Votes	%	±%
Country	Arthur Fadden	15,235	33.1	+33.1
Labor	John Buchanan	13,321	29.0	−10.2
United Australia	James Annand	8,725	19.0	−41.8
Conservative	Leslie Boyce	5,809	12.6	+12.6
Social Credit	Denis Hannay	2,929	6.4	+6.4
Total formal votes		46,019	96.9	
Informal votes		1,472	3.1	
Turnout		47,491	92.2	
Two-party-preferred result
Country	Arthur Fadden	26,380	57.3	+57.3
Labor	John Buchanan	19,639	42.7	+3.5
Country gain from United Australia		Swing	+3.5	

==== 1934 ====
1934 Australian federal election: Darling Downs
Party	Candidate	Votes	%	±%
United Australia	Sir Littleton Groom	29,428	60.8	+25.6
Labor	Phil Alke	18,940	39.2	+39.2
Total formal votes		48,368	98.0	
Informal votes		999	2.0	
Turnout		49,367	96.8	
United Australia gain from Independent		Swing	+25.6	

==== 1931 ====
1931 Australian federal election: Darling Downs
Party	Candidate	Votes	%	±%
Independent	Sir Littleton Groom	23,597	54.7	+31.2
United Australia	Arthur Morgan	15,212	35.2	−11.4
Independent	Herbert Yeates	4,365	10.1	+10.1
Total formal votes		43,174	98.0	
Informal votes		879	2.0	
Turnout		44,053	97.0	
Two-party-preferred result
Independent	Sir Littleton Groom		59.8	+59.8
United Australia	Arthur Morgan		40.2	−17.7
Independent gain from United Australia		Swing	+17.7	

=== Elections in the 1920s ===
==== 1929 ====
1929 Australian federal election: Darling Downs
Party	Candidate	Votes	%	±%
Nationalist	Arthur Morgan	19,238	46.6	−53.4
Labor	Evan Llewelyn	12,738	30.9	+30.9
Ind. Nationalist	Sir Littleton Groom	9,290	22.5	+22.5
Total formal votes		41,266	97.9	
Informal votes		864	2.1	
Turnout		42,130	97.2	
Two-party-preferred result
Nationalist	Arthur Morgan	23,873	57.9	−42.1
Labor	Evan Llewelyn	17,393	42.1	+42.1
Nationalist hold		Swing	−42.1	

==== 1928 ====
1928 Australian federal election: Darling Downs
Party	Candidate	Votes	%	±%
Nationalist	Sir Littleton Groom	unopposed		
Nationalist hold		Swing		

==== 1925 ====
1925 Australian federal election: Darling Downs
Party	Candidate	Votes	%	±%
Nationalist	Sir Littleton Groom	23,648	63.1	+4.5
Labor	Duncan McInnes	13,803	36.9	−4.5
Total formal votes		37,451	97.2	
Informal votes		1,063	2.8	
Turnout		38,514	93.1	
Nationalist hold		Swing	+4.5	

==== 1922 ====
1922 Australian federal election: Darling Downs
Party	Candidate	Votes	%	±%
Nationalist	Littleton Groom	19,592	58.6	−0.9
Labor	James MacDougall	13,857	41.4	+0.9
Total formal votes		33,449	96.8	
Informal votes		1,092	3.2	
Turnout		34,541	85.2	
Nationalist hold		Swing	−0.9	

=== Elections in the 1910s ===
==== 1919 ====
1919 Australian federal election: Darling Downs
Party	Candidate	Votes	%	±%
Nationalist	Littleton Groom	17,974	57.7	+1.6
Labor	Phil Alke	13,180	42.3	−1.6
Total formal votes		31,154	98.2	
Informal votes		569	1.8	
Turnout		31,723	87.1	
Nationalist hold		Swing	+1.6	

==== 1917 ====
1917 Australian federal election: Darling Downs
Party	Candidate	Votes	%	±%
Nationalist	Littleton Groom	17,815	56.1	−0.8
Labor	John Wilson	13,937	43.9	+0.8
Total formal votes		31,752	98.3	
Informal votes		544	1.7	
Turnout		32,296	90.5	
Nationalist hold		Swing	−0.8	

==== 1914 ====
1914 Australian federal election: Darling Downs
Party	Candidate	Votes	%	±%
Liberal	Littleton Groom	15,148	56.9	−3.1
Labor	Paul Bauers	11,495	43.1	+3.1
Total formal votes		26,643	96.7	
Informal votes		914	3.3	
Turnout		27,557	78.0	
Liberal hold		Swing	−3.1	

==== 1913 ====
1913 Australian federal election: Darling Downs
Party	Candidate	Votes	%	±%
Liberal	Littleton Groom	15,648	60.0	−8.8
Labor	Barnett Allen	10,451	40.0	+8.8
Total formal votes		26,099	97.2	
Informal votes		741	2.8	
Turnout		26,840	74.6	
Liberal hold		Swing	−8.8	

==== 1910 ====
1910 Australian federal election: Darling Downs
Party	Candidate	Votes	%	±%
Liberal	Littleton Groom	13,010	69.9	+4.8
Labour	Morris Harland	5,609	30.1	−4.8
Total formal votes		18,619	97.2	
Informal votes		540	2.8	
Turnout		19,159	57.2	
Liberal hold		Swing	+4.8	

=== Elections in the 1900s ===
==== 1906 ====
1906 Australian federal election: Darling Downs
Party	Candidate	Votes	%	±%
Protectionist	Littleton Groom	7,440	65.1	−34.9
Anti-Socialist	Horace Ransome	3,991	34.9	+34.9
Total formal votes		11,431	95.9	
Informal votes		488	4.1	
Turnout		11,919	37.8	
Protectionist hold		Swing	−34.9	

==== 1903 ====
1903 Australian federal election: Darling Downs
Party	Candidate	Votes	%	±%
Protectionist	Littleton Groom	unopposed		
Protectionist hold		Swing		

1901 Darling Downs by-election
Party	Candidate	Votes	%	±%
Protectionist	Littleton Groom	4,532	62.8	−15.7
Independent	Joshua Bell	2,687	37.2	+37.2
Total formal votes		7,219		
Protectionist hold		Swing	−15.7	

==== 1901 ====
1901 Australian federal election: Darling Downs
Party	Candidate	Votes	%	±%
Ind. Protectionist	William Groom	4,685	78.5	+78.5
Ind. Protectionist	Horace Ransome	1,283	21.5	+21.5
Total formal votes		5,968	96.4	
Informal votes		224	3.6	
Turnout		6,192	56.0	
Ind. Protectionist win		(new seat)		
