= Arthur Morgan (disambiguation) =

Arthur Morgan is the protagonist of the video game Red Dead Redemption 2.

Arthur Morgan may also refer to:

- Arthur Morgan (Australian politician, born 1856) (1856–1916), Premier of Queensland, Australia
- Arthur Ernest Morgan (1878–1975), American administrator, educator and engineer
- Arthur Morgan (Australian politician, born 1881) (1881–1957), member for Darling Downs in the Australian Parliament, 1929–1931
- Arthur Eustace Morgan (1886–1972), British professor of English and principal of University College Hull and McGill University
- Arthur C. Morgan (1904–1994), American sculptor
- Tony Morgan (sailor) (1931–2024; born Arthur Morgan), British Olympic sailor
- Arthur Morgan (Irish politician) (born 1954), Irish Sinn Féin politician and Teachta Dála for Louth, 2002–2011
