= Apsara Dance =

Cambodian dance

Robam Tep Apsara របាំទេពអប្សរា
- Genre: Royal Ballet of Cambodia
- Instrument: Pinpeat Orchestra
- Origin: Cambodia

Robam Tep Apsara (Khmer: របាំទេពអប្សរា) is one of the traditional dances of the Royal Ballet of Cambodia repertoire. It is performed by women, sewn into tight-fitting traditional dress, whose graceful, sinuous gestures are codified to narrate classical myths or religious stories. It is one of the national symbols of Cambodia.

== History ==
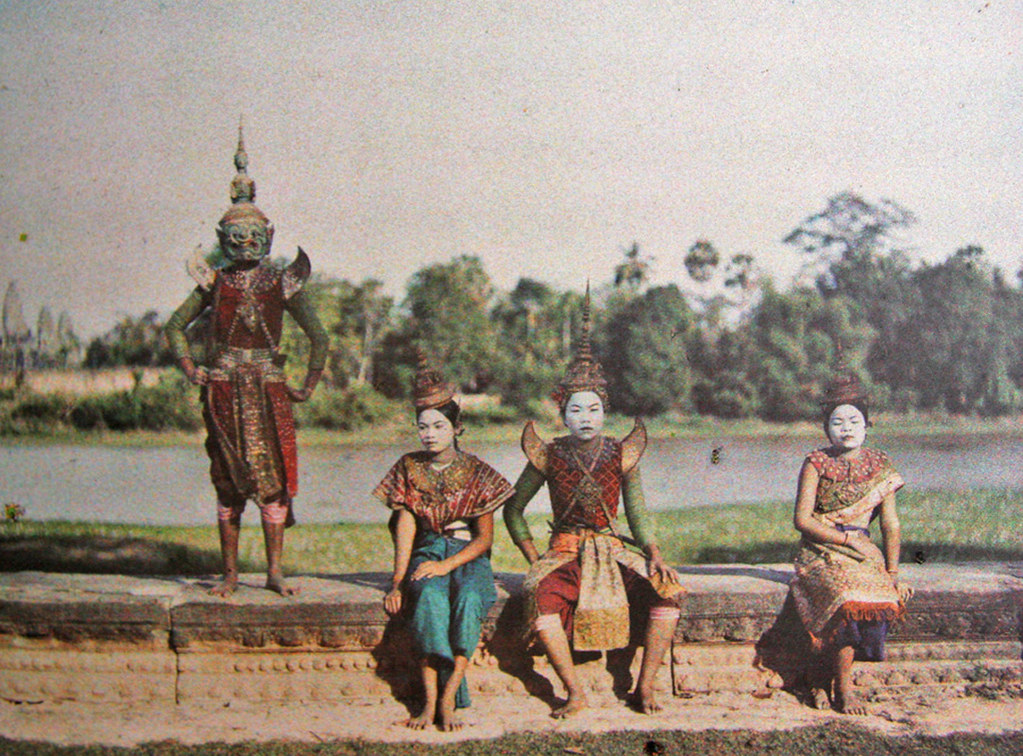
Cambodian ballet dancers by Angkor Wat in the early 20th century.

Apsara represent an important motif in the stone bas-reliefs of the Angkorian temples in Cambodia (8th–13th centuries AD), however all female images are not considered to be apsara. In harmony with the Indian association of dance with apsaras, Khmer female figures that are dancing or are poised to dance are considered apsara; Female figures, depicted individually or in groups, who are standing still and facing forward in the manner of temple guardians or custodians are called devatas.

In the 1950s, Queen Sisowath Kossamak, the wife of King Norodom Suramarit, was sent an invitation to visit the Sothearath primary school. While there, she saw the school mistress prepare an Angkor apsara dance performed by young school children in the paper apsara costume. This included a crown, sampot, and flower, all referencing apsaras represented at Angkor. The Queen was inspired to re-create the Apsara dance from the Phuong Neary dance (Khmer: របាំភួងនារី), and uses music from the pinpeat orchestra, a song titled 'Deum Chheung' (Khmer: ដើមឈិង). This led her first granddaughter, Princess Norodom Buppha Devi, a daughter of Norodom Sihanouk, to become the first professional apsara dancer of the modern era. The Princess started practicing the dance at five years old and danced Apsara for first time during King Norodom Sihanouk's tenure.

In 1967, the fine–boned young princess, clad in silk and glittering jewels, performed beneath the stars on the open pavilion within the palace walls, accompanied by the royal dance troupe and the pinpeat orchestra. Selected by her grandmother, Queen Sisowath Kossomak, to become a dancer when she was only a baby. She toured the world as the principal dancer of the apsara role.

== Costume ==
Apsara crown, anklets, & flower cascade.

The costumes of the apsara role is based on the devatas as depicted on the bas-relief of Angkor Wat. They wear a sampot sarabap, a type of silk brocade skirt-cloth. The sampot, worn samloy-style and also called samloy robab, is intricately pleated in the front like the Angkorean devata. The lead's sampot is generally white.

On top, a silk bodice is worn, generally skin-color, to suggest nudity.

=== Headdress ===
The headdress of the lead apsara has three points or tips, with two rows of spherical decorations like the apsara pictured at Angkor. Headdress worn by the subordinate dancers commonly have three points and only one row of sphere decoration. These crowns often include garlands of artificial hair with ornate adornments. The five-points crowns are frequently absent in modern dance routines.

A flower tassel is worn on the left side of her mokot and a champei on the right side of her head. Champeis are sometimes worn in a cascade in her hair.

=== Accessories ===
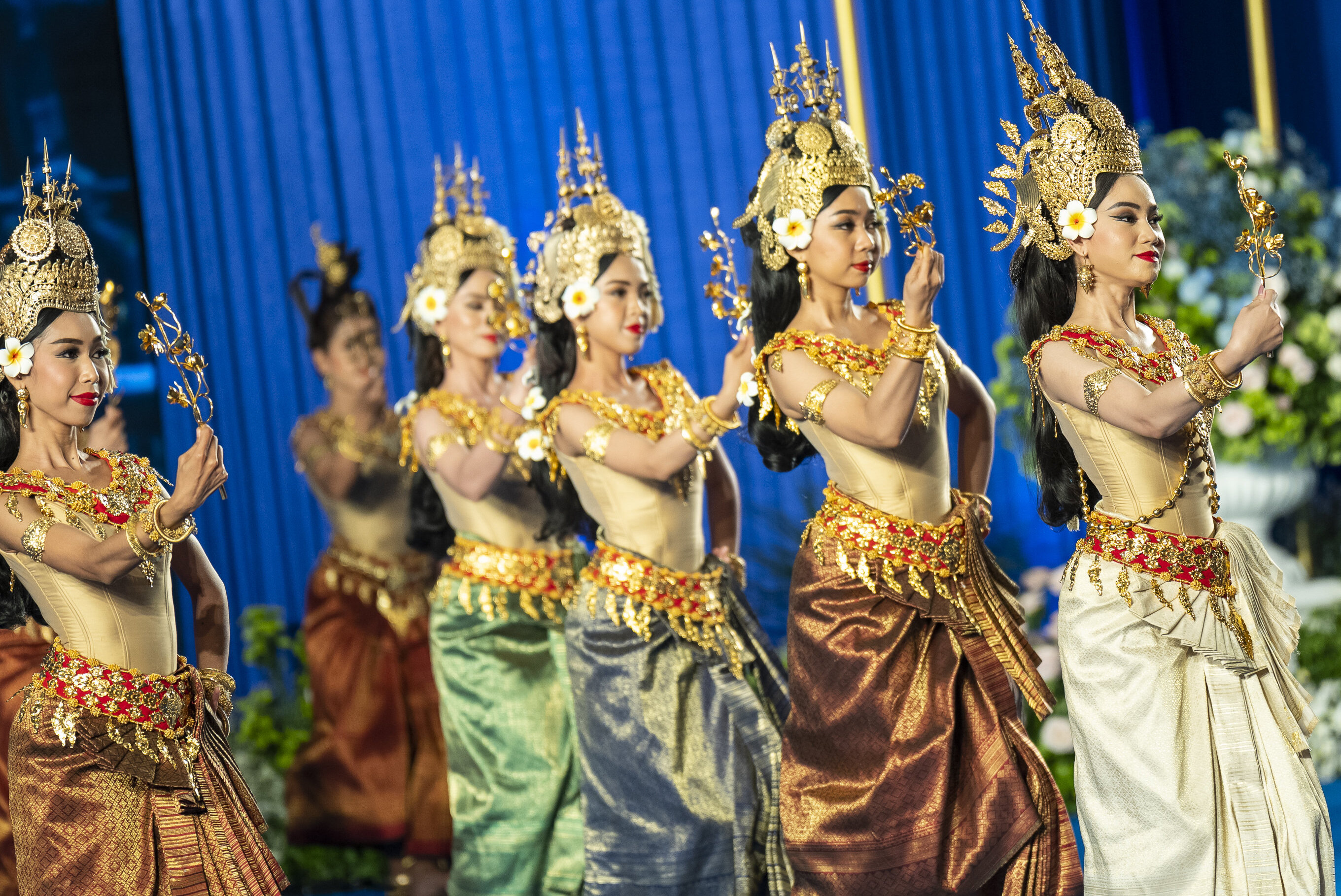
An Apsara Dance performance

The round decorative collar just below the neck, called srang kar or samrong kar, is embellished with detailed gold-colored copper ornaments and beaded designs. The elaborate decorations is usually found gracefully decorated on two separate rows. Additional copper ornaments are found hanging below these rows, in the shape of difficult-to-describe warped spear tips, the largest of which is centralized.

Kravat khim khat, an Apsara dancer's belt, resembles her samrong kar/srang kar.

Dangling earrings, which are bound in bunches, traditionally stretch almost to the shoulder. These dangling earrings are mainly duplicated from the design of the krorsang flower (a large spiny tree with sour fruit) and are preferred to the 'mete' (chili) flowers.

There are a total of four types of wrist jewelry: kong rak, a diamond-like studded bracelet decorated in a tree branch-like fashion; patrum, a spring-like coiled gold colored thick copper; kong ngor, bracelets (two sets are worn) of small, round beaded orb/sphere bunches connected to one another, and sanlek, an intricate and well decorated thickly rounded jewel. Additionally, an Apsara dancer may wear a garland of jasmine. The apsara wears an armlet, called snab dei or baing phap, on both arms.

Two types of gold ankle jewelry are usually worn by the Apsara dancer, the first being kong tong chhuk, and the second kong ngor (or kong kravel).

The sangvar is a loosely decorated band of beads worn crosswise. The golden flower is considered a body-decorating element, either worn on the waist or carried during the performance. It too is gold in color, and made of thin flexible copper.

== Prima Ballerinas ==
In the Royal Ballet, a prima ballerina for the apsara role is considered. Starting with Princess Norodom Buppha Devi there have been many others since the dance's conception. Sin Sakkada is the current prima ballerina for the apsara role.

- Mrs. Seng Sreymom (អ្នកស្រី សេង ស្រីមុំ)
- Mrs. Voan Savay (អ្នកស្រី វ័ន សាវៃ)
- Mrs. Douch Thach (អ្នកស្រី ឌុក ថាច)
- Mrs. Voan Savong (អ្នកស្រី វ័ន សាវង្ស)
- Mrs. Yim Devi (អ្នកស្រី យឹម ទេវី)
- Mrs. Mom Kanika (អ្នកស្រី ម៉ម កណិការ)
- Mrs. Ouk Phalla (អ្នកស្រី អ៊ុក ផល្លា)
- Mrs. Sok Sokhoeun (អ្នកស្រី សុខ សុខឿន)
- Mrs. Chap Chamroeunmina (អ្នកស្រី ចាប ចំរើនមិនា)
- Mrs. Chen Chansoda (អ្នកស្រី ចិន្ត ចន្ទសុដា)
- Ms. Sin Sakkada (កញ្ញា សុិន សក្កដា)

== See also ==
- Dance in Cambodia
- Earth in Flower
- Khmer classical dance

== Sources ==
- Keo, Narom; Prum, Sisaphanta (August 2003). របាំអប្សរា | Apsara Dance. Research Committee on Arts and Culture, Ministry of Culture and Fine Arts, Phnom Penh.
- "Apsara Dance | របាំអប្សរា". Angkor Database.
- Som, Somony (2018). ""Apsara" from Indian Mythology to Khmer Sculpture and Khmer Classical Dance" (PDF). Royal Academy of Cambodia.
- Cravath, Paul (1986). "The Ritual Origins of the Classical Dance Drama of Cambodia". Asian Theatre Journal. 3 (2): 179–203. doi:10.2307/1124400. JSTOR 1124400.
- Kol, Sarou (2018). "One Corner of Intangible Culture Heritage of Cambodia" (PDF). Royal Academy of Cambodia.
- Norodom Buppha Devi (2016). "Royal Dances of Cambodia — Revival and Preservation". Beyond the Apsara. London New York New Delhi: Routledge India. pp. 1–13. doi:10.4324/9780367817916-1. ISBN 978-1-138-66262-9.
- Tuchman-Rosta, Celia (2014). "From Ritual Form to Tourist Attraction: Negotiating the Transformation of Classical Cambodian Dance in a Changing World". Asian Theatre Journal. 31 (2): 524–544. doi:10.1353/atj.2014.0033 – via Project MUSE.
- Daugbjerg, Mads; Eisner, Rivka; Knudsen, Britta (2017). "A new identity rooted in antiquity: re-enacting Angkor and the invention of the Apsara dance during Cambodian independence". Re-Enacting the Past. Routledge. p. 32. doi:10.4324/9781315673431. ISBN 978-1-317-37615-6.
- Lytle, Tiffany J. (2023-12-08). "Apsara Aesthetics and Belonging: On Mixed-Race Cambodian American Performance". Genealogy. 7 (4): 97. doi:10.3390/genealogy7040097. ISSN 2313-5778.
- Ponsiri, Yuwadee (November 2022). "The Creation of an Artificial Dance: Apsara Dance (Tae We) Ta Muen Thom Dance to Cultural Tourism". Journal of Human and Society (in Thai). 4 (2). Sisaket Rajabhat University: 50–68.
