= Arthur C. Morgan =

American sculptor

Arthur Carmine Morgan (August 3, 1904 – September 9, 1994) was an American sculptor, mostly of Louisiana political and business figures. Morgan's work can be seen across his home state of Louisiana and in the Capitol Visitor Center, Washington, DC. He and his wife Gladys B. Morgan ran an art school, the Southwestern Institute of Arts, in their Shreveport home for over forty years.

== Early life and education ==
Born at Riverton Plantation in Ascension Parish, he was educated in Louisiana public and private schools. At an early age Morgan went to New England and New York, where he attended art schools and graduated from Beaux-Arts Institute of Design, a mostly vocational art school in New York City. He became a private pupil and protégé of Gutzon Borglum and worked in the studios of Mario Korbel, Attilio Piccirilli, and others.

== Sculpting and teaching career ==
Morgan began exhibiting his work at age fifteen. At least one critic called him a "boy prodigy." At age sixteen in 1920 Morgan was given his first commission, for a bust of physician Simon Baruch (father of financier Bernard M. Baruch). This led to more commissions for busts and bas-reliefs, often in bronze. He also made decorative bronzes and garden sculptures.

In 1928 Morgan went back to Louisiana to begin work on a proposed Longfellow Evangeline national monument at Bayou Teche in St. Martinville. Although Morgan worked in New Orleans on models for the project, it ended at that stage owing to funding woes.

That same year Morgan settled permanently in Shreveport where he taught sculpture, drawing and art history at Centenary College. There he met faculty member and watercolor artist Gladys Butler (born 1899), whom he married on July 26, 1929, in McDonald County, Missouri. In 1934 the Morgans left the college and began an art and music school in their home, calling it the Southwestern Institute of Arts.

The Morgans had two daughters, Diana Morgan Welsh (born 1930) and Cynthia Butler Morgan (born 1932). Cynthia died in May 1936 following a house fire. For his daughter's tombstone Morgan designed a granite medallion, with a bas-relief profile of the girl and Celtic lettering, which is listed by the Smithsonian. Following the fire, the Morgans moved with their art school to 657 Jordan Street in Shreveport where it stayed open for more than forty years. Built in 1909, by 2011 the classical revival, two-story, four-columned house was still standing but abandoned.

In 1975, after leasing their Shreveport property and furnishings to Max Edmonson, president of the Shreveport Boys choir, Morgan and his wife moved to London from whence they hoped to acquire marble in Italy for some of his sculpting projects. However these plans fell through and they came back to the United States in January 1978.

Morgan sculpted many busts and decorative bronzes, among them larger architectural sculptures and marble groups. His work is in private collections and public buildings such as Louisiana State University, Centenary College, the US Federal Court House at Alexandria, Louisiana, and the US Capitol in Washington D.C. Through the span of his career Morgan had long-lasting friendships with Jules Bache, Bernard M. Baruch, Lincoln Borglum, Frances Elliott Clark and Jean Despujols.

His wife Gladys B. Morgan died in 1981. Arthur C. Morgan died on September 9, 1994, in Shreveport, after which much of his work was reportedly thrown away or abandoned, though some was later recovered and put in storage. Morgan, his wife Gladys and their daughter Cynthia are buried together in the same family plot at Forest Park Cemetery in Shreveport. His grave is unmarked.

== Works and commissions ==
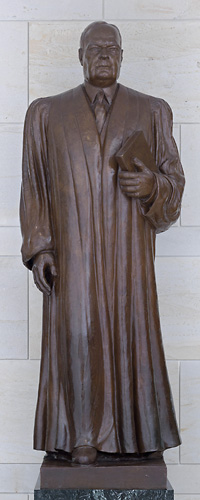
Morgan's bronze sculpture of Edward Douglass White at the US Capitol in Washington DC, given by the state of Louisiana in 1955 to the National Statuary Hall Collection

- Simon Baruch, (private collection) 1921
- Henry L. Fuqua, Louisiana governor, 1924.
- James M. Smith, president of Louisiana State University, 1931.
- R. B. Butler, judge, originally at the Terrebonne Parish Courthouse, Houma Louisiana, 1936.
- Cynthia medallion, 1936.
- Cecil Morgan, vice president of Esso Standard Oil Co. (private collection), 1939.
- Edward Douglass White, US supreme court justice, Capitol Visitor Center, Washington D.C., 1954 (given in 1955).
- S.D. Morehead, memorial, Centenary College campus, 1957.
- Earl K. Long, Louisiana governor, monument, Winnfield, Louisiana, 1962.
- Henry Miller Shreve monument, Riverfront Pkwy, Shreveport, Louisiana, 1967.
- Clyde E. Fant, mayor of Shreveport, 1975
- Jean Despujols, French- American painter, (private collection), 1948 & 1977
- John D. Ewing, editor and publisher, Shreveport Times Building.
- Marquis de Lafayette, French general, unveiled at the Waldorf-Astoria Hotel, N.Y., 1922
- Lyle Saxon, New Orleans journalist, Times-Picayune, 1931
- Peter Bonneau Jr., memorial medallion, Kappa Alpha Fraternity, 1947
- Van Cliburn medallion, Symphony House, 1958
- A. J. Hodges, Hodges Gardens, 1972
- John McWilliams Ford, mayor of Shreveport and later commissioner of finance (1930–1965).
- Stone carvings, St. Mark’s Episcopal Church and Holy Rosary Catholic Church.
- James Cousins, Michigan senator, portrait bust
- Joseph E. Ransdell, Louisiana senator
- Transportation of the Mails (bronzes), U.S. Post Office & Courthouse, Alexandria, Louisiana
- Fountain figures, Bossier Center and Kilpatrick Life Insurance Building.
