= Statue of Edward Douglass White =

Bronze sculpture in Washington, D.C.

Edward Douglass White
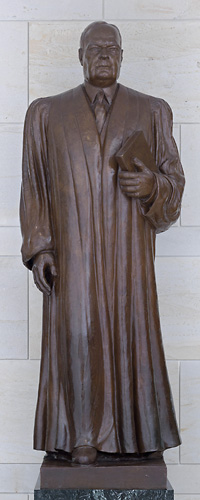
- Artist: Arthur C. Morgan
- Medium: Bronze sculpture
- Subject: Edward Douglass White
- Location: Washington, D.C., United States

Edward Douglass White is bronze sculpture depicting the American politician and jurist of the same name by Arthur C. Morgan, installed in the United States Capitol Visitor Center, in Washington, D.C., as part of the National Statuary Hall Collection. The statue was donated by the U.S. state of Louisiana in 1955.
