= 1936 Darling Downs by-election =

- 19 December 1936
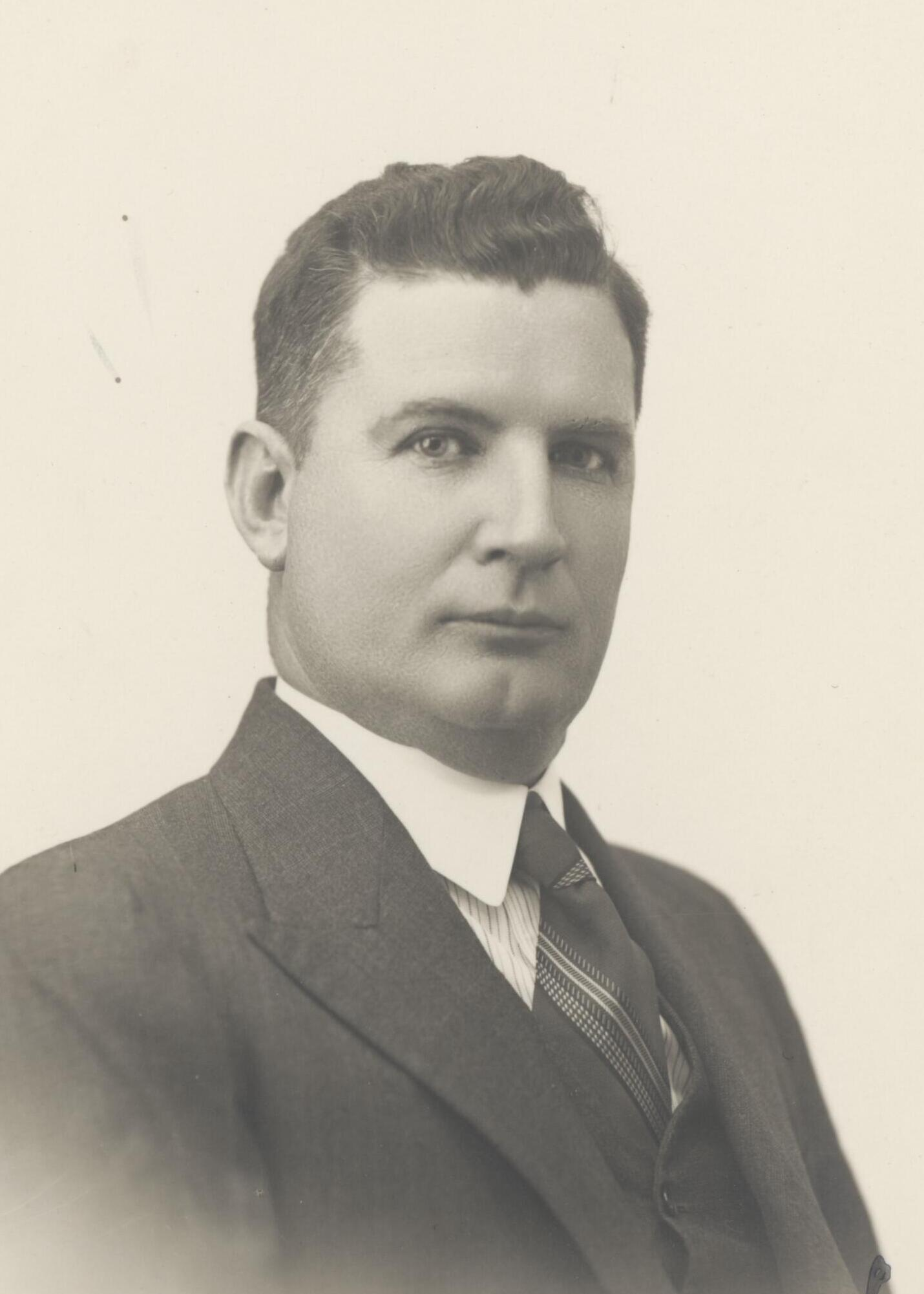
	First party	Second party
		LAB
Candidate	Arthur Fadden	John Buchanan
Party	Country	Labor
Popular vote	15,235	13,321
Percentage	33.1%	29.0%
Swing	▲33.1pp	▼10.2pp
TPP	57.3%	42.7%
TPP swing	▲57.3pp	▲3.5pp
	Third party	Fourth party
	UAP
Candidate	James Annand	Leslie Boyce
Party	United Australia	Independent Conservative
Popular vote	8,725	5,809
Percentage	19.0%	12.6%
Swing	▼41.4pp	▲12.6pp
MP before election
Littleton Groom
United Australia
Elected MP
Arthur Fadden
Country

A by-election was held for the Australian House of Representatives seat of Darling Downs on 19 December 1936. This was triggered by the death of United Australia Party MP and former Speaker Sir Littleton Groom.

The by-election was won by Country Party candidate and future Prime Minister Arthur Fadden.

== Results ==
Darling Downs by-election, 1936
Party	Candidate	Votes	%	±%
Country	Arthur Fadden	15,235	33.1	+33.1
Labor	John Buchanan	13,321	29.0	−10.2
United Australia	James Annand	8,725	19.0	−41.8
Conservative	Leslie Boyce	5,809	12.6	+12.6
Social Credit	Denis Hannay	2,929	6.4	+6.4
Total formal votes		46,019	96.9	
Informal votes		1,472	3.1	
Turnout		47,491	92.2	
Two-party-preferred result
Country	Arthur Fadden	26,380	57.3	+57.3
Labor	John Buchanan	19,639	42.7	+3.5
Country gain from United Australia		Swing	+3.5	
