= Forest Park Cemetery (Shreveport) =

Cemetery in Shreveport, Louisiana

Coordinates: 32°28′25″N 93°45′35″W

- Interactive map of Forest Park Cemetery

Details
- Location: Shreveport, Louisiana
- Country: United States
- Type: Private-Historic
- Style: Garden, park
- Owned by: Letum Care Inc.
- Size: 134 acres (54 ha)
- No. of graves: ~40,000

Forest Park Cemetery, also known as Forest Park East, is a historic, privately owned cemetery located at 3700 St. Vincent Avenue in Shreveport, Louisiana. Established in 1917, the cemetery spans nearly 134 acres and contains roughly 40,000 burials and internments.

== History ==
The cemetery was founded in 1917 by landscape architect Charles W. Hughes and Dr. Henry H. Nichols, who had the goal of blending nature with the environment while respecting and representing the final resting place for some of Shreveport's early residents. The first burial was recorded in April 1919, when 14-year-old Frederick Lanier Boanno was interred. During the Great Depression, the property became insolvent and was subsequently purchased by local business leader William C. Raspberry, who would rescue and stabilize burial operations. The burial grounds include numerous above ground mausoleums as well as in-ground burials. In 1958, it's sibling cemetery was established, Forest Park Cemetery West, which itself spans another 132 acres on Meriwether Road. The properties are currently owned by the Pennsylvania-based Letum Care Inc.

== Notable burials ==
- Arthur C. Morgan (1904–1994) - sculptor, educator
- Charles Emery Tooke Jr. (1912–1986) - State Senator, U.S. Navy officer
- Clyde Connell (1901–1998) - sculptor, artist
- Gabriel P. Disosway (1910–2001) - U.S. Airforce General
- John William Corrington (1932–1988) - novelist, poet, screenwriter
- Overton Brooks (1897–1961) - State Representative
- Rose McConnell Long (1892–1970) - U.S. Senator
