= 1901 Darling Downs by-election =

Australian federal by-election

| ← 1901 | 14 September 1901 | 1903 → |

The Darling Downs seat in the House of Representatives
- Turnout: 7,264
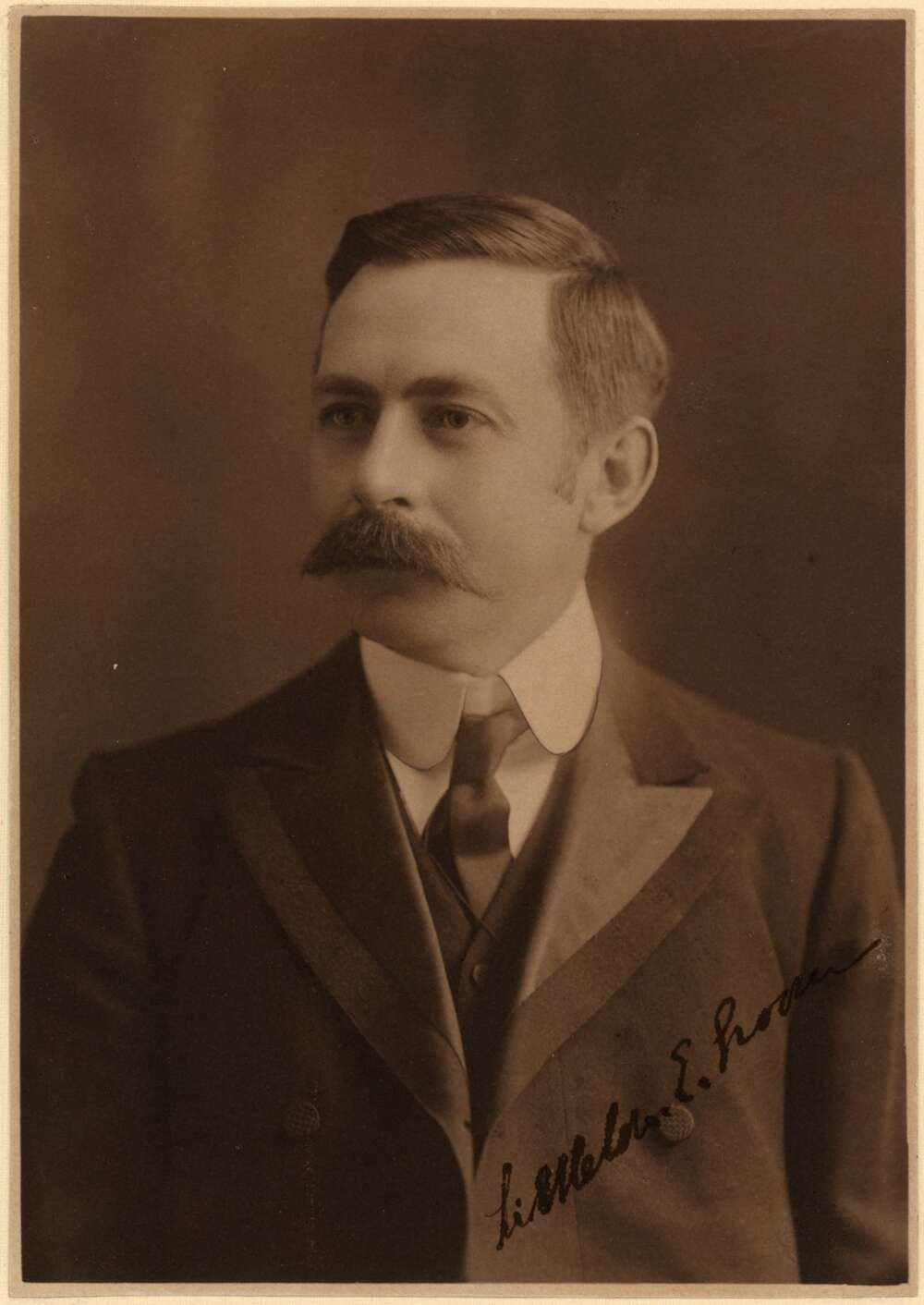

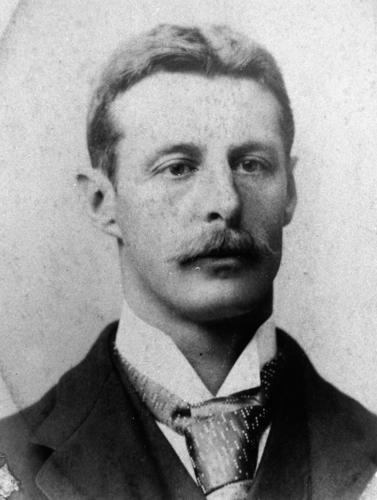
| | First party | Second party |
|---|---|---|
| Candidate | Littleton Groom | Joshua Thomas Bell |
| Party | Protectionist | Independent |
| Popular vote | 4,532 | 2,687 |
| Percentage | 62.78% | 37.22% |
| Swing | ▼15.72 | ▲37.22 |
MP before election
William Henry Groom
Protectionist
Elected MP
Littleton Groom
Protectionist

A by-election was held for the Australian House of Representatives electorate of Darling Downs in Queensland on 14 September 1901, a Saturday. It was triggered by the death of William Henry Groom on 8 August 1901. It was the first by-election of the Australian parliament since Federation. The writ for the by-election was issued on 13 August, nominations for candidates closed on 27 August.

== Results ==
Darling Downs by-election, 1901
| Party | Candidate | Votes | % | ±% |
|---|---|---|---|---|
| Protectionist | Littleton Groom | 4,532 | 62.78 | −15.72 |
| Independent | Joshua Thomas Bell | 2,687 | 37.22 | +37.22 |
| Total formal votes | | 7,219 | 99.38 | +3.00 |
| Informal votes | | 45 | 0.62 | −3.00 |
| Turnout | | 7,264 | N/A | N/A |
| Protectionist hold | | Swing | −15.72 | |

== Aftermath ==
Littleton Groom was elected in the by-election, receiving nearly 63 per cent of the vote. Groom was the third son of the deceased former member, William Groom. The other candidate in the by-election was Joshua Thomas Bell, a member of the Legislative Assembly of Queensland for the electoral district of Dalby.

== See also ==
- List of Australian federal by-elections
