= Arthur Fadden =

Prime Minister of Australia in 1941

The Right Honourable Sir Arthur Fadden GCMG
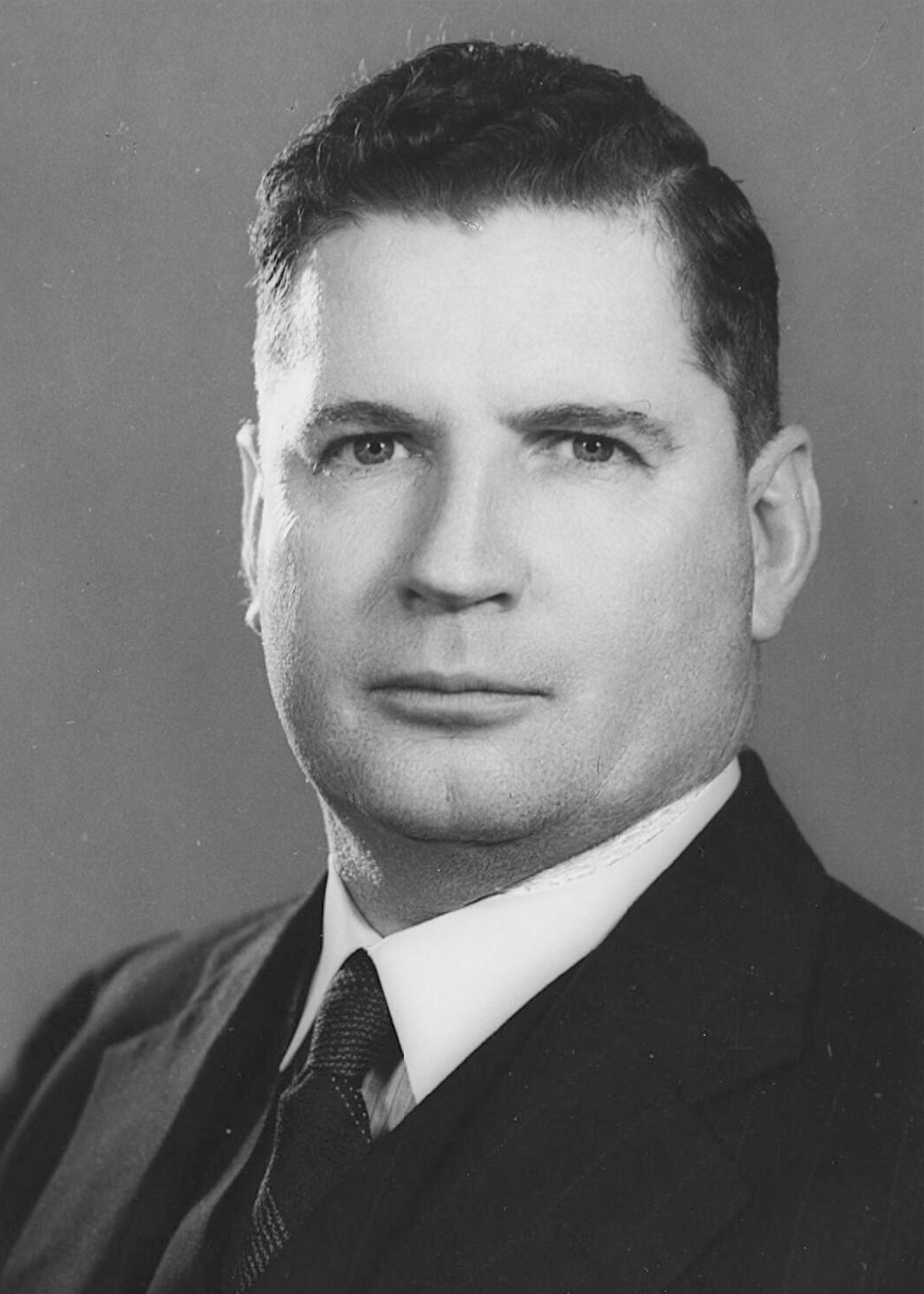
- Official portrait, 1940

13th Prime Minister of Australia
- In office 29 August 1941 – 7 October 1941
- Monarch: George VI
- Governor-General: Lord Gowrie
- Deputy: Robert Menzies
- Preceded by: Robert Menzies
- Succeeded by: John Curtin

4th Leader of the Country Party
- In office 12 March 1941 – 26 March 1958; Acting: 16 October 1940 – 12 March 1941
- Deputy: Himself; John McEwen
- Preceded by: Archie Cameron
- Succeeded by: John McEwen

Deputy Prime Minister of Australia
- De facto 19 December 1949 – 26 March 1958
- Prime Minister: Robert Menzies
- Preceded by: H. V. Evatt
- Succeeded by: John McEwen
- De facto 16 October 1940 – 29 August 1941
- Prime Minister: Robert Menzies
- Preceded by: Earle Page
- Succeeded by: Robert Menzies

Deputy Leader of the Country Party
- In office 16 October 1940 – 12 March 1941
- Leader: Archie Cameron; Himself (acting)
- Preceded by: Harold Thorby
- Succeeded by: John McEwen

Leader of the Opposition
- In office 7 October 1941 – 23 September 1943
- Prime Minister: John Curtin
- Deputy: Billy Hughes
- Preceded by: John Curtin
- Succeeded by: Robert Menzies

Treasurer of Australia
- In office 19 December 1949 – 9 December 1958
- Prime Minister: Robert Menzies
- Preceded by: Ben Chifley
- Succeeded by: Harold Holt
- In office 28 October 1940 – 7 October 1941
- Prime Minister: Robert Menzies; Himself
- Preceded by: Percy Spender
- Succeeded by: Ben Chifley
Federal electorates
Member of Parliament for McPherson
In office 10 December 1949 – 14 October 1958
Preceded by	New seat
Succeeded by	Charles Barnes
Member of Parliament for Darling Downs
In office 6 November 1936 – 10 December 1949
Preceded by	Littleton Groom
Succeeded by	Reginald Swartz
State electorates
Member of the Queensland Legislative Assembly for Kennedy
In office 11 June 1932 – 11 May 1935
Preceded by	Harry Bruce
Succeeded by	Cecil Jesson

Personal details
- Born: Arthur William Fadden; 13 April 1894 Ingham, Colony of Queensland
- Died: 21 April 1973 (aged 79) Brisbane, Queensland, Australia
- Resting place: Mount Thompson Crematorium
- Party: Country (from 1936)
- Other political affiliations: CPNP (until 1936)
- Spouse: Ilma Thornber (m. 1916)
- Children: 4
- Education: Walkerston State School
- Occupation: Politician; accountant

Sir Arthur William Fadden (13 April 1894 – 21 April 1973) was the 13th prime minister of Australia, serving from 29 August to 7 October 1941. He held office as the leader of the Country Party from 1940 to 1958 and served as treasurer of Australia from 1940 to 1941 and 1949 to 1958.

Fadden was born in Ingham, Queensland, to Irish immigrant parents. He was raised in Walkerston, and left school at the age of 15. He was appointed town clerk of Mackay in 1916, but following the 1918 cyclone moved to Townsville and opened an accountancy firm. He was elected to the Townsville City Council in 1930, and in 1932 was elected to the Queensland Legislative Assembly for the Country and Progressive National Party. Fadden lost his seat in 1935, but the following year won a by-election to the federal Division of Darling Downs.

In March 1940, Fadden was named a minister without portfolio in the government of Robert Menzies, who led the United Australia Party in a coalition with the Country Party. A few months later, following the deaths of three senior ministers in an air crash, he took over as Minister for Air and Minister for Civil Aviation. In October 1940, Fadden was elected acting leader of the Country Party as a compromise candidate, following a deadlocked leadership vote between Earle Page and John McEwen. He became the de facto deputy prime minister and was promoted by Menzies to treasurer.

Fadden was acting prime minister for four months early in 1941 (while Menzies was away in Europe), and became popular for his conciliatory manner. He became the official leader of the Country Party following a ballot in March 1941. In August 1941, Menzies resigned as prime minister after losing the confidence of his ministry. Fadden was elected leader of the UAP–Country coalition in his place, and consequently became prime minister. However, he held office for just 39 days before being replaced by John Curtin, whose Labor Party had successfully moved a motion of no confidence with the support of two independents. After losing the prime ministership, Fadden continued on as leader of the opposition for two more years. In that capacity, he eventually resigned in favour of Menzies following the coalition's massive defeat at the 1943 election.

When Menzies returned as prime minister in 1949, Fadden became treasurer and de facto deputy prime minister for a second time, holding office until his retirement from politics in 1958. Only Peter Costello has served in the position for longer. Fadden enjoyed one of the most rapid rises in Australian political history, moving from private citizen to the prime ministership in just 11 years. He was the first prime minister born in Queensland, and the first and only member of the Country Party to become prime minister with his own mandate (rather than just serving as a caretaker after the death of a predecessor).

== Early life ==
=== Childhood ===
Fadden was born in Ingham, Queensland, on 13 April 1894. He was the eldest of ten children – seven sons and three daughters – born to Annie (née Moorhead) and Richard John Fadden. His parents were both born in Ireland, his mother in County Tyrone and his father in County Galway.

Fadden moved to Walkerston at a young age, where his father was officer-in-charge of the local police station. He had a "typical country childhood", but suffered the deaths of three of his younger siblings in separate accidents. Fadden received his only formal education at the Walkerston State School, except for a brief period at Te Kowai while his usual school was being renovated. His first jobs included collecting cane beetles and performing sound effects at the local cinema. Fadden left school at the age of 15 and began working as a "billy boy" (odd-job man) on a cane-cutting gang at Pleystowe. He later secured an indoor job as an office boy at the Pleystowe Sugar Mill, where his colleagues include two future Labor MPs – Maurice Hynes and George Martens. In his spare time, he developed an interest in the theatre, both as a performer and treasurer of the local company.

=== Professional career ===
In April 1913, Fadden moved to Mackay to become assistant town clerk of the Mackay Town Council. He defeated 56 other applicants for the position. In 1916, his superior, Frederick Morley, was dismissed as town clerk over allegations of theft, which Fadden himself had uncovered. Morley eventually received a two-year jail term, and Fadden was promoted in his place, again defeating more than 50 other applicants; he was reputedly the "youngest town clerk in Australia". He had attempted to enlist in the Australian Army the previous year, but was rejected on health grounds. In 1918, Fadden served on the committee of the relief fund for the Mackay cyclone, which devastated the town and killed thirty people. However, he resigned as town clerk in September of that year and moved to Townsville (the largest settlement in North Queensland), where he established his own accountancy firm. He had qualified as an accountant through a correspondence course from a school in Melbourne.

According to his memoirs, Fadden initially struggled to make ends meet as an accountant, and considered relocating to Brisbane. However, he eventually found an unused loophole in the tax code that allowed him to gain a competitive advantage. His business prospered thereafter, and he was able to take on partners and opened a second office in Brisbane. In 1930, Fadden was elected to the Townsville City Council as part of a non-partisan grouping calling themselves the "serviceable six". He developed a feud with the city's chief engineer, Sidney Roberts, whom he publicly criticised for using coal from New South Wales instead of from the local Bowen Basin mines. He was once again able to use his auditing skills to his advantage, getting Roberts fired for inconsistencies in his balance sheets. The resulting publicity was a springboard for his political career.

== Early political career ==
=== State politics ===
At the 1932 Queensland state election, Fadden was elected to the Queensland Legislative Assembly as a member of the Country and Progressive National Party (CPNP). Aided by a favourable redistribution, he won the seat of Kennedy from the Australian Labor Party by just 62 votes. He was the only candidate from his party to win a seat from Labor, which won majority government on a swing of almost 10 points. In parliament, Fadden came to notice as a critic of the new government's financial operations. He accused the government of lacking transparency and accountability, particularly in its use of trust funds which he said had been used to cover up revenue deficiencies. His speeches impressed both his party and political correspondents, and he was asked to write a series of articles for The Courier-Mail.

Fadden was the CPNP's lead speaker in the 1934 budget debates, effectively making him the chief financial spokesman for the opposition (which would be considered today as Shadow Treasurer). In the lead-up to the 1935 state election, a redistribution turned Kennedy into a safe Labor seat. It was alleged by the opposition that the government had specifically targeted Fadden's seat in order to remove him as a political threat. Faced with certain defeat, he chose to run in the neighbouring seat of Mirani. However, he lost to Labor's Ted Walsh by 224 votes, as the government won a landslide victory. In his memoirs, he accused Labor of having pork-barreled Mirani in the lead-up to the election to ensure his defeat.

=== Move to federal politics ===
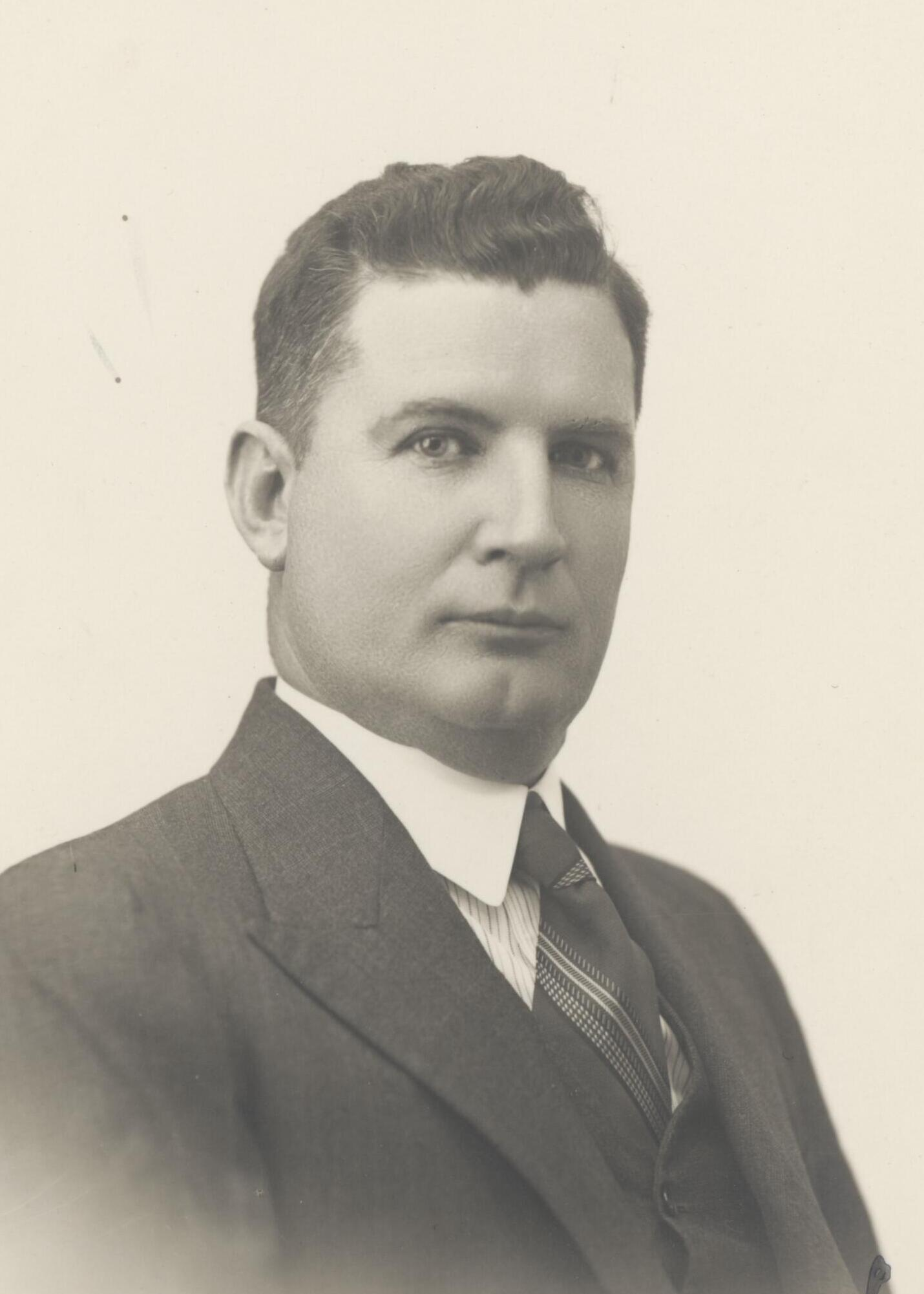
Fadden in 1938

After losing his seat in state parliament, Fadden moved to Brisbane, and initially returned to his accounting practice. In early 1936, he joined the Queensland Country Party, which had split from the CPNP in order to align with the federal Country Party. Later that year, he was elected to the Australian House of Representatives at a by-election for the Division of Darling Downs. It was caused by the death of the previous member, Littleton Groom, who was a member of the United Australia Party (UAP). Fadden, who had no previous connection with the area, was the first member of his party to contest the seat; the UAP suffered a negative swing of over 40 points. He consolidated his hold on the seat at the 1937 federal election, held less than a year later.

== Menzies government, 1939–1941 ==
=== Country Party tensions ===
In April 1939, Prime Minister Joseph Lyons died in office and was replaced by Country Party leader Earle Page on an interim basis. When Robert Menzies was elected by the United Australia Party (UAP) as Lyons' replacement, Page gave a speech accusing Menzies of disloyalty and questioning his record of military service. As a result of Page's attacks, which they deemed unfair, Fadden and Bernard Corser resigned from the parliamentary Country Party to sit as "Independent Country" members; they were soon followed by Oliver Badman and Thomas Collins. Fadden was generally seen as the leader of the group. When Page was forced out of the leadership in September 1939, they attempted to re-join the party, but the remaining members opted – by a single vote – not to re-admit them. Archie Cameron, generally seen as Page's ally, was elected as the party's new leader. Fadden did not regard Cameron favourably, in one debate stating: "I take this opportunity to declare without the slightest degree of reservation that the honourable gentleman is not my leader". When asked in another debate if he were still a member of the Country Party, he replied "no, I am not, thank goodness, as it is now constituted and under its present leadership". However, in early November 1939, Cameron invited the four breakaways to rejoin the party in the interests of unity, which they accepted.

The Country Party's coalition with the UAP had lapsed following Menzies' elevation to the prime ministership. In March 1940, Menzies and Cameron agreed to resume the coalition, providing an opportunity for five Country Party members to be added to the ministry. Cameron somewhat unexpectedly nominated Fadden as a Country Party representative, and he was appointed as an assistant minister to the Treasurer of Australia (Percy Spender) and the Minister for Supply and Development (Frederick Stewart). In August 1940, Fadden narrowly escaped being killed in the Canberra air disaster, which claimed the lives of three government ministers and the Chief of the General Staff. He was scheduled to be aboard the flight, which was transporting the ministers back to Canberra after a cabinet meeting in Melbourne, but instead took an overnight train. He traded places with Richard Elford (James Fairbairn's private secretary), who had wanted to stay in Melbourne to celebrate a wedding anniversary; both Elford and Fairbairn were among those killed. After the crash, Fadden replaced Fairbairn as Minister for Air and Minister for Civil Aviation; he also continued as assistant minister to the Treasurer.

=== Ascension to deputy prime minister ===
The 1940 Australian federal election resulted in a hung parliament. The UAP–Country coalition was able to remain in power with the support of two independent MPs, Alexander Wilson and Arthur Coles. The Country Party lost three seats to the Labor Party, and on 16 October the parliamentary party voted to remove Archie Cameron as leader. John McEwen and Earle Page both nominated for the leadership, and Fadden intended to nominate for the deputy leadership. McEwen and Page were tied at eight votes each after three separate ballots. During a break for dinner, Fadden was asked to become interim leader as a compromise between the two candidates, with the intention that another leadership ballot would be held in a few months. He was then elected unopposed as deputy leader and thus acting leader of the party. According to his biographer Tracey Arklay, "Fadden was selected because the majority in the party room considered that he was the man most likely to be able to broker deals and negotiate with Menzies and the UAP". Edgar Holt believed Fadden's personality was a major factor – "he had no obvious ambitions and he suffered from no delusions of grandeur [...] he was amiable and gregarious" – but also thought that Page had allowed Fadden to assume the leadership in order to deny it to McEwen.

As the acting leader of his party, Fadden became the de facto deputy prime minister and joined the Advisory War Council. He was sworn in as treasurer on 28 October 1940, succeeding Percy Spender, and presented his first budget less than a month later on 21 November. The budget featured increased levels of spending due to the ongoing war, offset by significant increases in taxation – including a reduction in the tax-free threshold, increased company taxes, and a tax on undistributed profits. In presenting the budget, Fadden noted that it brought about "the heaviest financial imposts ever placed upon the people of Australia". It was highly unpopular among the general public, which up until that point had perceived the war to be still quite distant. The independent MPs contemplated voting with the opposition to reject the budget, but after negotiations and some amendments it was able to be passed, allowing the government to continue in power.

Fadden was formally elected to the leadership of the Country Party on 12 March 1941, winning the ballot unopposed with the support of both McEwen and Page.

== Prime Minister, 1941 ==
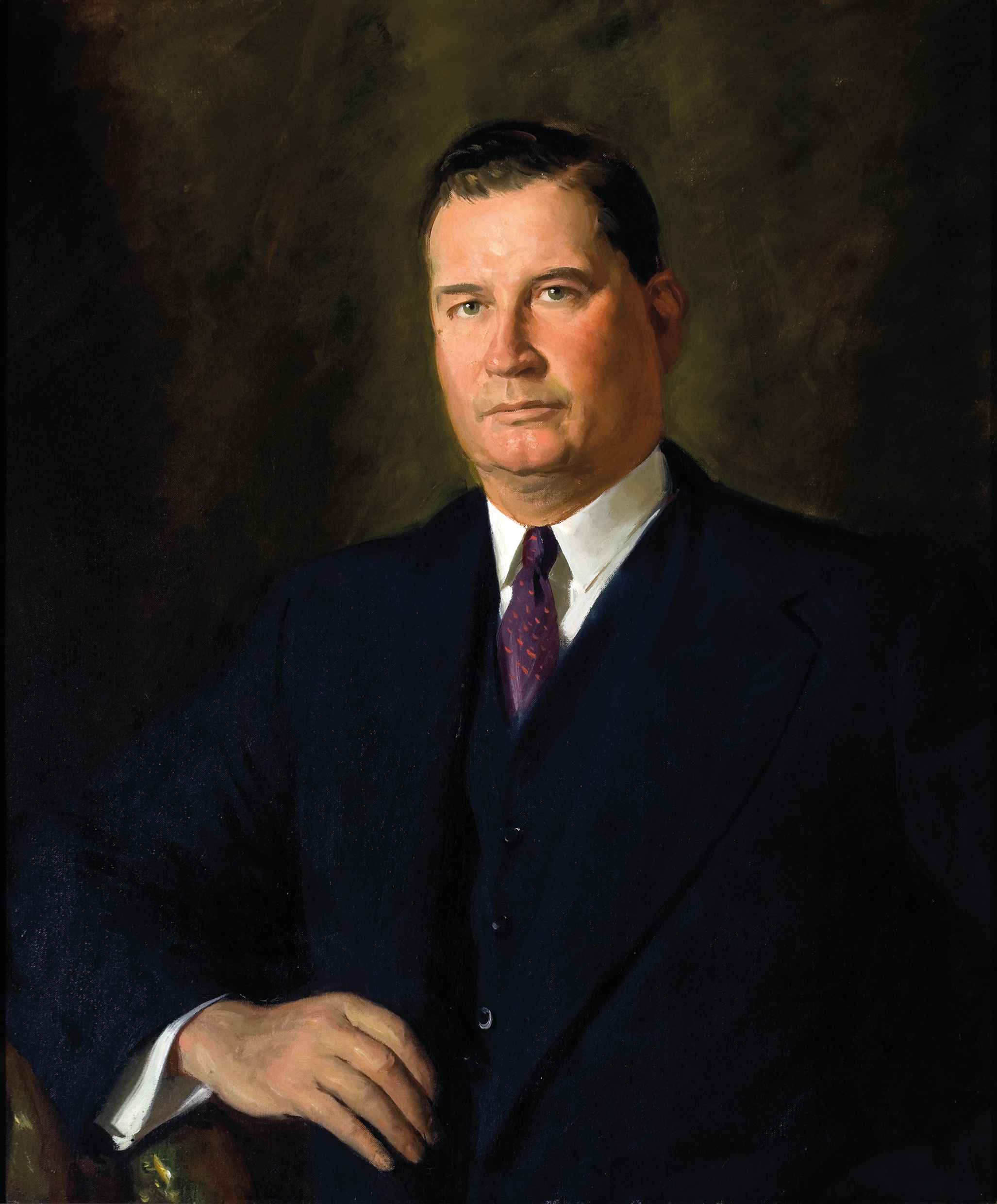
Parliament House portrait of Fadden by William Dargie, 1947

=== Swearing in and cabinet ===
In August 1941 Robert Menzies resigned as prime minister. Although the non-Labor Coalition had been in power for a decade, the UAP was so bereft of leadership that on 28 August a joint UAP-Country meeting chose Fadden as Coalition leader even though the Country Party was the smaller of the two non-Labor parties. Fadden was duly sworn in as prime minister the next day, and also remained treasurer. He was the only member of the Country/National Party to serve as prime minister without an expectation of a short tenure (the other two Country/National prime ministers, Page and McEwen, were caretakers).

Nevertheless, Fadden's term of office was troubled from the start. Even parliamentarians in his own party feared the worst. It was later reported that Fadden decided against moving into The Lodge, the official prime minister's residence in Canberra, after his predecessor as Country Party leader, Cameron, crudely told him that he would "scarcely have enough time to wear a track from the backdoor to the shithouse before you’ll be out".

Fadden made only minor changes to Menzies' final ministry, continuing as treasurer and allowing Menzies to continue as minister for defence co-ordination. He was one of six members of the Country Party in cabinet, with the other thirteen being UAP members.

=== War policy ===
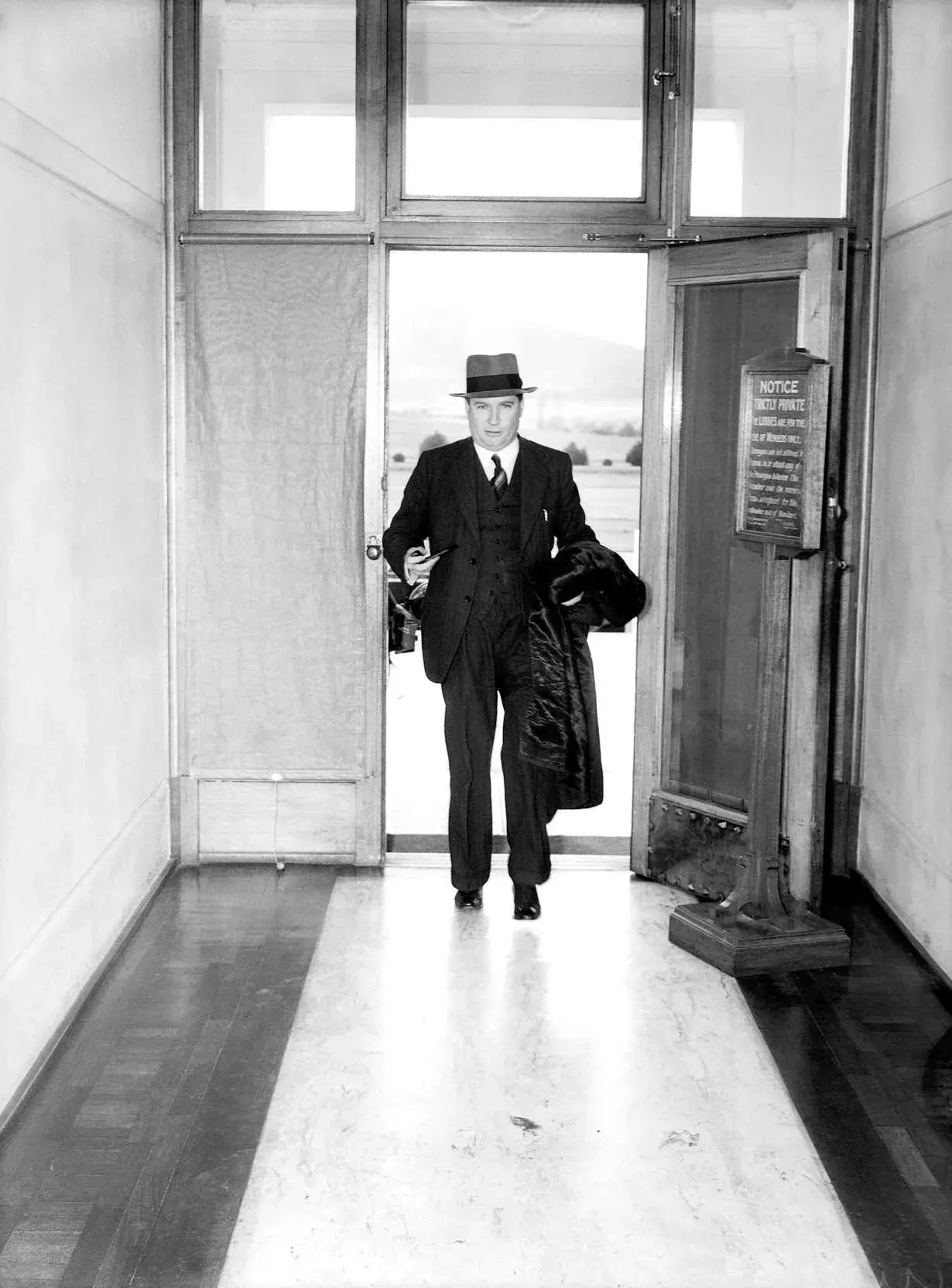
Fadden arriving at Parliament House, Canberra, during his prime ministership

Fadden's brief term as prime minister was marked by continued tension with the British government over the conduct of the war in Europe and the deployment of Australian military assets. One of his first actions as prime minister was to appoint Earle Page as a special envoy to the British war cabinet in London, an attempt to secure greater Australian involvement in British military policy. In a telegram shortly after his appointment, British prime minister Winston Churchill assured Fadden that "we shall never let you down if real danger comes". Fadden and Churchill subsequently came into conflict over the Australian troops at the Siege of Tobruk – the so-called "Rats of Tobruk" – who had been placed under British command. At the request of Australian general Thomas Blamey, Fadden ordered that the troops at Tobruk be returned to sole Australian control, stating to Churchill that it was "vital to [the] Australian people to have concentrated control and direction of its Expeditionary Forces". Churchill and the British government attempted to stall against passing on the orders and they were not carried out until Curtin succeeded as prime minister and reaffirmed Fadden's stance.

=== Winkler case ===
Parliament resumed three weeks after Fadden's appointment as prime minister. While continuing to govern in minority, he initially enjoyed the support of independents Arthur Coles and Alexander Wilson on the floor of the House. Their support proved crucial during the so-called "Winkler case", when ALP frontbencher Eddie Ward raised allegations made by journalist Joseph Winkler, who had been briefly employed in the Prime Minister's Office under Menzies and then been dismissed by Fadden. Winkler alleged that Attorney-General Billy Hughes, with Fadden's knowledge, had made illegal payments to trade union leaders to prevent industrial unrest during war.

Fadden addressed the allegations in an in camera session of parliament, during which he disclosed that the government had established a secret fund in 1916 to finance matters relating to national security, including payments to the anti-communist Australian Democratic Front. He subsequently established a royal commission into Winkler's allegations to satisfy opposition concerns. The commission, chaired by Percival Rogers, delivered its report after the government's defeat and found no evidence of illegal activity, although some concerns were noted over the evidence given by Hughes. Journalist Alan Reid nonetheless later suggested that the Winkler case had precipitated the government's defeat.

=== Budget ===
Fadden presented his second federal budget as treasurer and first as prime minister on 25 September 1941. The budget focused on raising additional revenue, as by that time he viewed war with Japan as inevitable. It included a major increase in military spending, from A£170 million (equivalent to $15.5 billion in 2022) to A£217 million (equivalent to $19.7 billion in 2022). Novel features of the budget were the institution of a system of post-war credits – effectively compulsory loans to the government – and the planned introduction of a national mortgage bank. The post-war credits were levied in a manner similar to income tax – up to 90 percent for the highest brackets – but accrued interest of two percent and would be repaid after the war. The budget also included an excess profits tax on corporations with a margin over eight percent.

In his memoirs, Fadden recalled the 1941–42 budget as one of the best two budgets he delivered as treasurer. He was particularly proud of the post-war credits scheme, which was based on a suggestion by John Maynard Keynes, but it was ultimately one of the few inclusions dropped by incoming ALP treasurer Ben Chifley after the government's defeat. Fadden later pointedly noted that, while his government had failed to pass its budget, the opposition had made no substantive criticisms of the budget itself.

=== Defeat ===
On 1 October 1941, during debate on the budget, opposition leader John Curtin moved that the "budget should be recast to ensure a more equitable distribution of the national burden", which the government treated as a loss of supply and therefore a confidence motion. The motion was fiercely debated until 3 October, when independent MP Arthur Coles rose and announced that he would vote against the government. The motion then proceeded to a vote which the government lost by 36 votes to 33, Coles and Wilson voting in favour. Fadden returned his commission to the Governor-General Lord Gowrie, who swore in Curtin as prime minister on 7 October after receiving confirmations from Coles and Wilson that they would support an ALP government.

Fadden's term in office lasted only 40 days and he later joked that, like the Great Flood, he had "reigned for forty days and forty nights". The defeat of the Fadden government is the most recent occasion on which an Australian government was forced to resign after being defeated on the floor of the House of Representatives. While apparently unsurprised and circumspect about his defeat, he was critical of Coles' role in voting down his budget and later alleged in parliament that Coles had only shifted his vote because Fadden had refused to appoint him to a cabinet post; Coles denied Fadden's account. Fadden had previously slighted Coles by ignoring a memorandum Coles had drafted on wartime policy, while both Coles and Wilson had been aggrieved with the handling of Menzies' departure and also had concerns over the Winkler allegations.

== Opposition (1941–1949) ==
=== Leader of the Opposition (1941–1943) ===
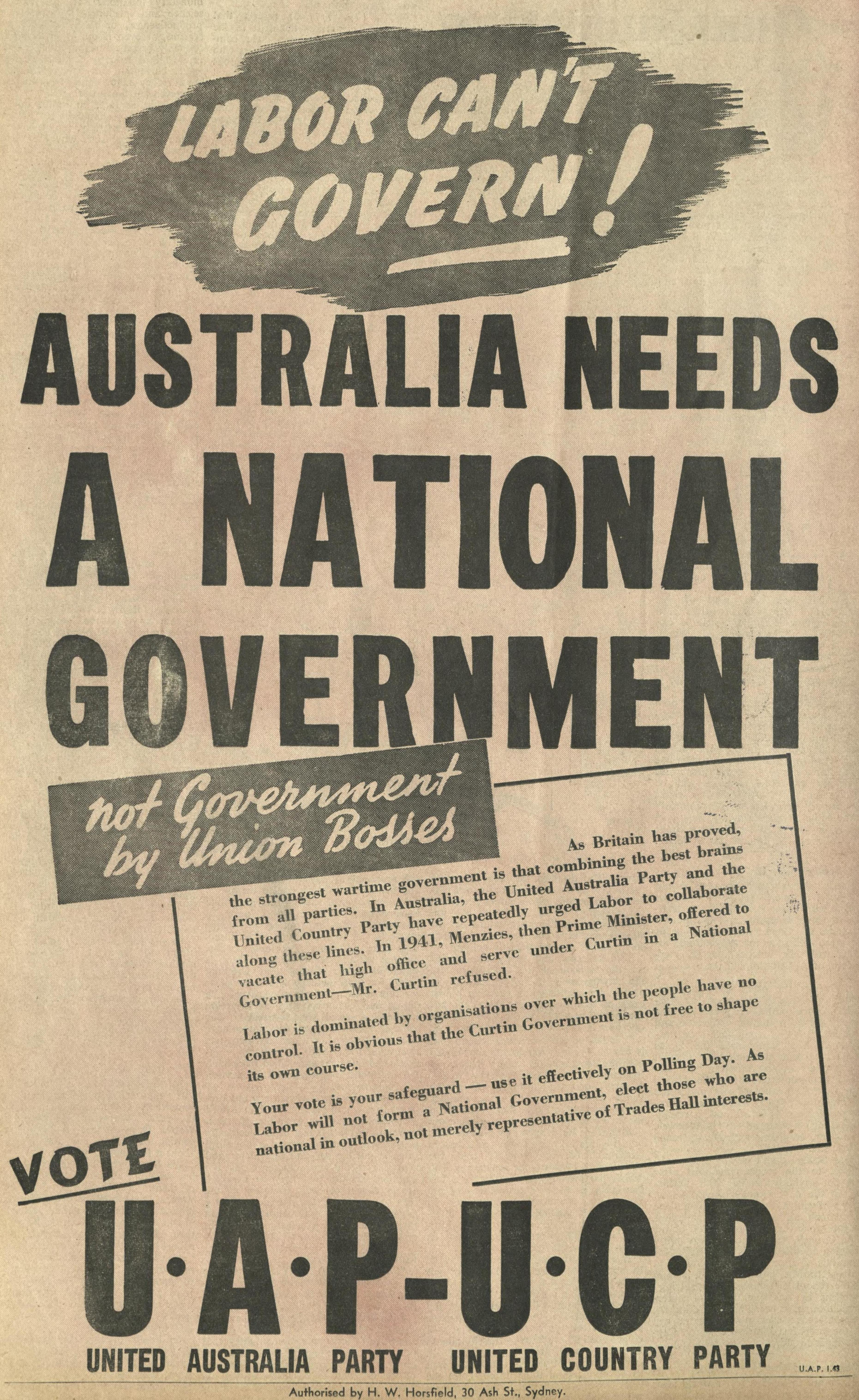
Election advertisement used by the Coalition at the 1943 Australian federal election

Following the fall of his ministry, a joint UAP-Country Party meeting endorsed Fadden as Leader of the Opposition, even though the UAP was nominally the senior coalition partner. As a result, Menzies resigned as UAP leader. The UAP was so bereft of leadership that it was forced to elect 79-year-old former Prime Minister Billy Hughes as its new leader. The Coalition sank into near-paralysis in opposition. Even allowing for Curtin's personal popularity, as well as the significant advantages which an incumbent government in a Westminster system has in wartime, Fadden proved a disappointment as Leader of the Opposition; he was unable to get the better of Curtin. The Coalition suffered a crushing loss in the 1943 election. It was reduced to 19 seats, including a mere seven for Fadden's Country Party. Accepting responsibility for this severe defeat, Fadden then handed the Opposition leadership back to Menzies, who had resumed the UAP leadership.

=== Rebuilding the Coalition (1943–1949) ===
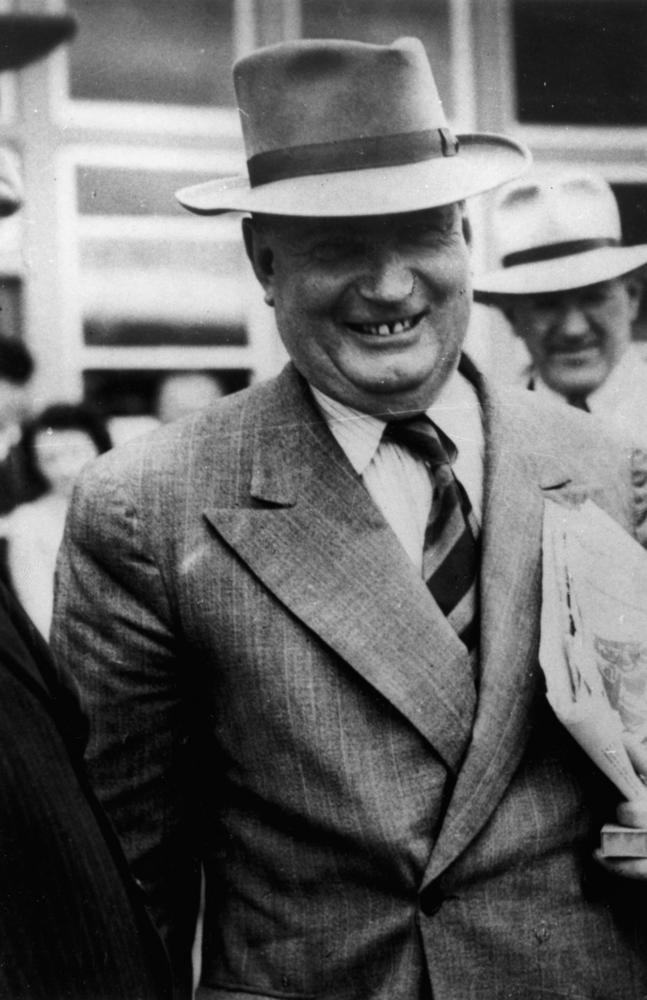
Fadden in 1949

After the 1943 election, the Country Party resolved to sit "as a separate party with its own leader, who shall be that leader alone", rather than continuing the joint opposition with the UAP. Fadden was re-elected as party leader with John McEwen as his deputy; both continued to sit on the Advisory War Council. They remained on the council after the UAP's withdrawal in 1944 and continued to attend meetings until its dissolution after the end of the war in 1945.

In parliament, Fadden and Menzies formed an initially uneasy partnership in their criticism of the Curtin government, with Fadden continuing to concentrate on financial matters. He and the Country Party initially supported the government's 1944 referendum giving the federal government expanded wartime powers, supporting the bill on its first reading; he had been a member of the drafting committee for a similar bill in 1942. However, by the third reading they joined Menzies and the UAP in voting against the referendum bill. Fadden subsequently played a leading role in the "No" campaign, arguing that its provisions were "dangerously wide" and would pave the way for socialism and an authoritarian government where Australians would "work under government compulsion [...] eat and wear what the bureaucrats ration out to them [...] live in mass-produced dwellings and [...] work wherever the bureaucrats tell them to work". The referendum failed and the campaign conducted by Fadden and Menzies has been cited as a template for later anti-Labor campaigns.

Fadden kept a distance as Menzies worked to create the new Liberal Party of Australia as a combination of the UAP and other right-wing organisations, preferring to preserve the separate identity of the Country Party. He and Menzies served as pallbearers at Curtin's funeral in July 1945, and in his memoirs Fadden stated that there was "no greater figure in Australian public life in my lifetime than Curtin". On a personal level Fadden felt greater affinity with Curtin and his successor Ben Chifley, each being the children of working-class Irish immigrants with limited academic training. However, his opposition to socialism ensured he never considered an alliance with the Labor Party, as had occurred at state level in Victoria where the Country Party governed with Labor support in the early 1940s.

=== Legal issues ===
In December 1943, Fadden sued the Australian Workers' Union and its affiliated newspaper The Worker for defamation, over a story alleging Fadden employed "enemy aliens" on illegally low wages on his sugar farms. He was awarded damages of £1,000 (equivalent to $80,000 in 2022) and "cherished the moral victory", choosing to frame and display the cheque in his house rather than cashing it.

During the parliamentary debate over the 1948–49 budget, Fadden alleged that the U.S. government was unwilling to share information with Australia due to the presence of "fifth columnists" in the government, citing confidential statements Chifley had made to British officials. In response, Chifley ordered the Commonwealth Investigation Branch to interview Fadden about how he had obtained the documents. Fadden refused to do so and subsequently moved a motion in the House of Representatives claiming a breach of parliamentary privilege, during which he compared the CIB to the Gestapo. His motion was defeated on party lines, while "the issue of whether police could question a member about his speeches in parliament remained unresolved".

== Treasurer, 1949–1958 ==
=== Post-war recovery ===
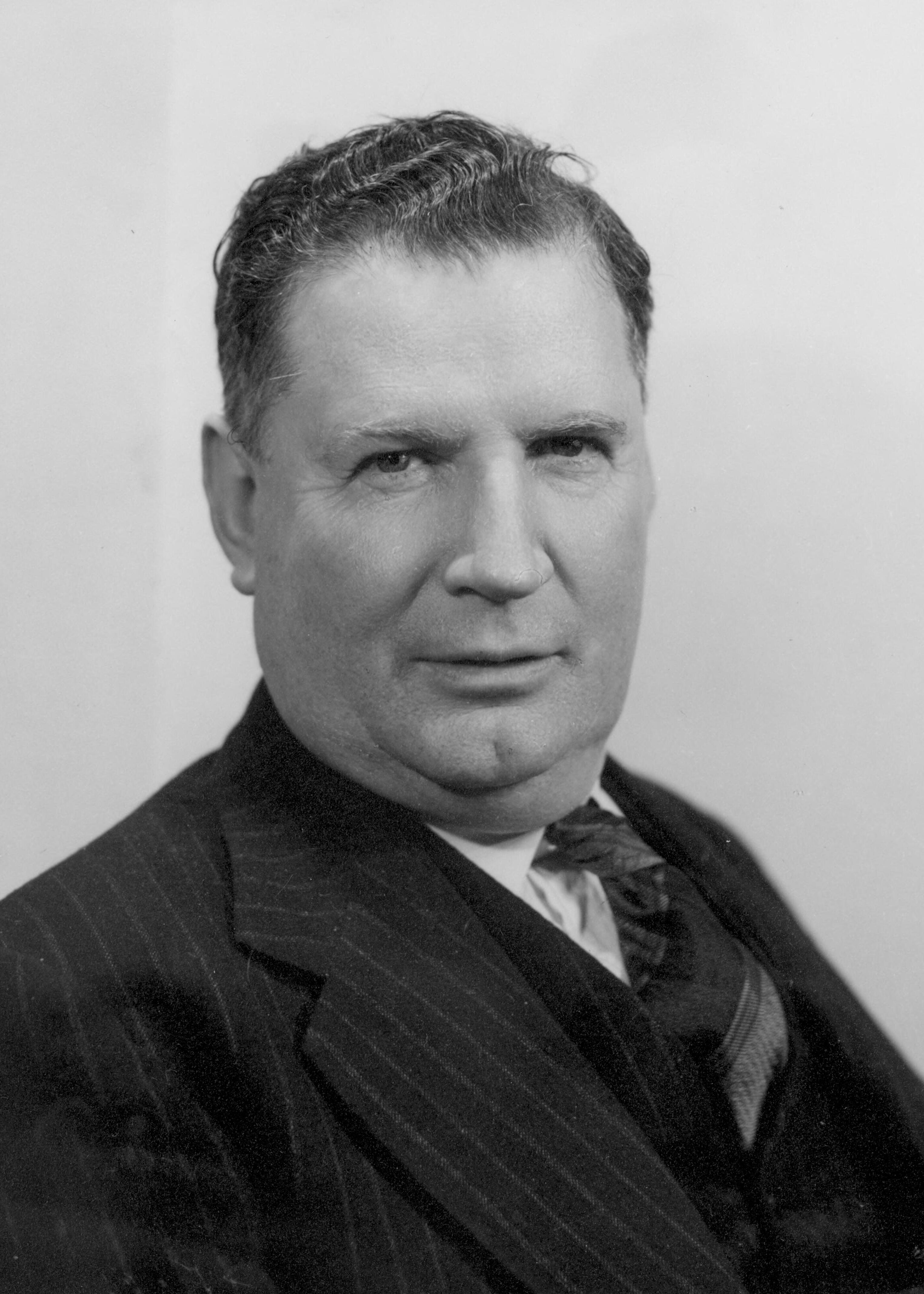
Fadden c. 1950

Fadden transferred to the new seat of McPherson at the 1949 election, with the Coalition returning to power in a landslide victory. He was reappointed treasurer in the fourth Menzies ministry on 19 December 1949. He was credited with developing the Coalition's popular policy of abolishing petrol rationing, a legacy from the war.

The Coalition won a massive victory in the 1949 election, and Fadden, who transferred to the newly created seat of the Division of McPherson on the Gold Coast, became treasurer in the second Menzies government. Although inflation was high in the early 1950s, forcing him to impose several "horror budgets" (such as in 1951, increasing overall taxation by 33% in response to a wool price boom), he generally presided over a booming economy, with times especially good for farmers.

Fadden was the only non-Liberal Treasurer in a Liberal-led Coalition government. Since Fadden's retirement every Treasurer in a Coalition government has been a Liberal.

=== Acting prime minister ===
As deputy prime minister, Fadden often deputised for Menzies during his frequent overseas trips. He served as acting prime minister for a record total of 676 days, both before and after his own stint as prime minister. In July 1950, while Menzies was in the United States, Fadden announced that Australia would commit ground troops to the United Nations Command in Korea. The decision was made at the urging of external affairs minister Percy Spender and without prior consultation with Menzies. Fadden was also acting prime minister when Menzies was travelling during the Suez Crisis, during which he announced Australian support for U.S. secretary of state John Foster Dulles' Suez Canal Users' Association proposal.

=== Final years in office ===
On the night before the 1954 federal election, Fadden was seriously injured in a car accident while travelling back to Brisbane from Dalby. Near Grantham, the car in which he was travelling failed to negotiate a curve on a slippery road, and rolled three times. Fadden, who had been sitting next to the driver, was pulled from the car unconscious and spent election day in hospital, unable to cast his vote. He was left with injuries to his face, head, and legs, and required five separate operations.

Fadden resigned as leader of the Country Party on 26 March 1958, with John McEwen elected unopposed as his successor. At the same time, he announced that he would retire from politics at the 1958 election. He delivered his eleventh and final budget on 5 August. Although the election was held on 22 November, he did not resign from the ministry until 9 December, remaining in office as treasurer for over two weeks while not being a member of parliament.

== Final years ==
After leaving parliament, Fadden pursued business interests across a wide range of industries. He visited Japan twice in 1959, and was appointed as the representative of a Japanese company hoping to acquire a licence to export iron ore from Western Australia. The deal fell through, which he attributed to political interference. Fadden was chairman of Centenary Estates Limited, which built the housing development that became known as the Centenary Suburbs. He took up several company directorships, including with the real estate firm Hooker Finance and the ice-cream manufacturer Toppa. He also worked as a consultant for a sugar mill in Tully, Queensland, and invested in an iron ore deposit at Mourilyan, Queensland. In 1960, he was commissioned by the state government to produce a report into the viability of Central Queensland ports.

In 1969, Fadden published a memoir titled They Called Me Artie. Reviewing the book for The Canberra Times, Don Aitkin observed that Fadden had "the reputation of a political buffoon, a man of earthy wit and hail-fellow-well-metness who survived in politics because he knew more and better stories than the next man [...] his autobiography does little to destroy that picture". Shortly before his death in 1973 he also published a nine-page account of his prime ministership in Australian Outlook, titled "Forty days and forty nights".

Fadden suffered from ill health during his retirement, including a bout of hepatitis and a vision defect that left him blind in one eye and required an operation to correct. He died of leukaemia on 21 April 1973, aged 79, at St Andrew's War Memorial Hospital in Brisbane. A state funeral was held at the Toowong Presbyterian Church on 27 April, followed by cremation at Mt Thompson Crematorium.

== Personal life ==
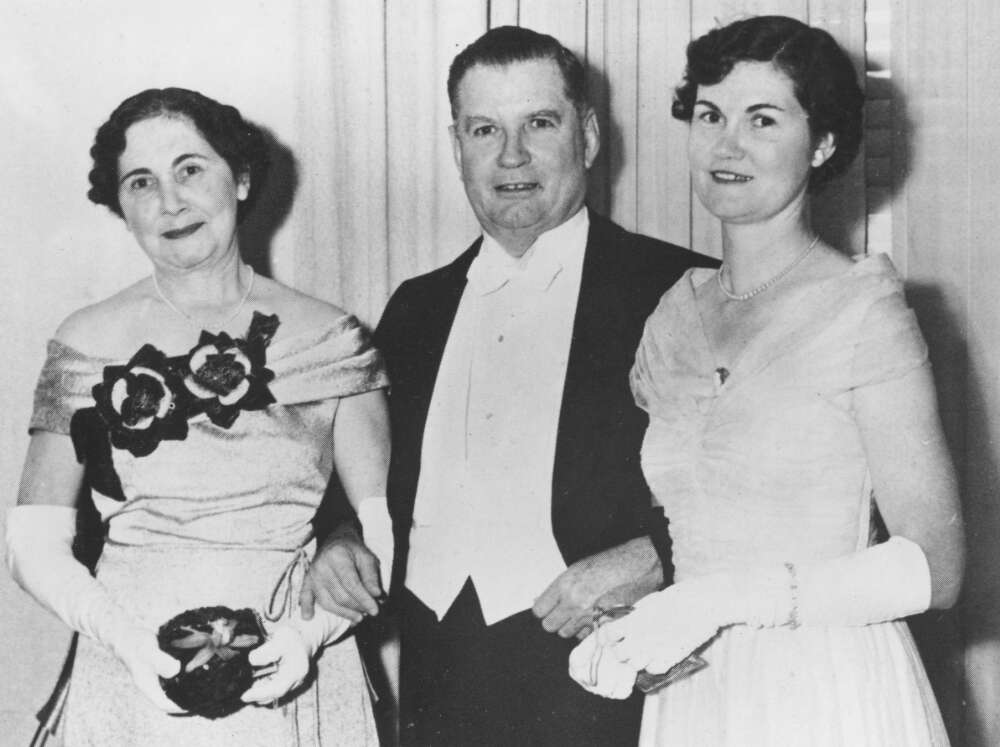
Fadden with his wife Ilma and daughter Betty at a ball in 1951

On 27 December 1916, Fadden married Ilma Nita Thornber (2 April 1895 – 14 May 1987), who worked as a milliner. Her father James Thornber and brother-in-law George Fay both served periods as mayor of Mackay. The couple had four children together – Gordon, John, Mavis, and Betty. His oldest son Gordon predeceased him, dying in 1956 at the age of 34. Arthur Fadden was initiated as a Freemason in Lodge Caledonia, No. 737 S.C. (Mackay, Qld), on 29 July 1915. After being elected to the Australian Parliament on 19 December 1936, he joined Lamington Lodge, No. 110 U.G.L.Q.(Brisbane, Qld), on 4 February 1937. Bro. Sir Arthur Fadden remained a member of Lamington Lodge, No. 110 U.G.L.Q., until he resigned in March 1973, a month before his passing.

Arthur Fadden was once a member of an acting group in Mackay called the "Nigger Minstrel Troupe".

== Honours ==
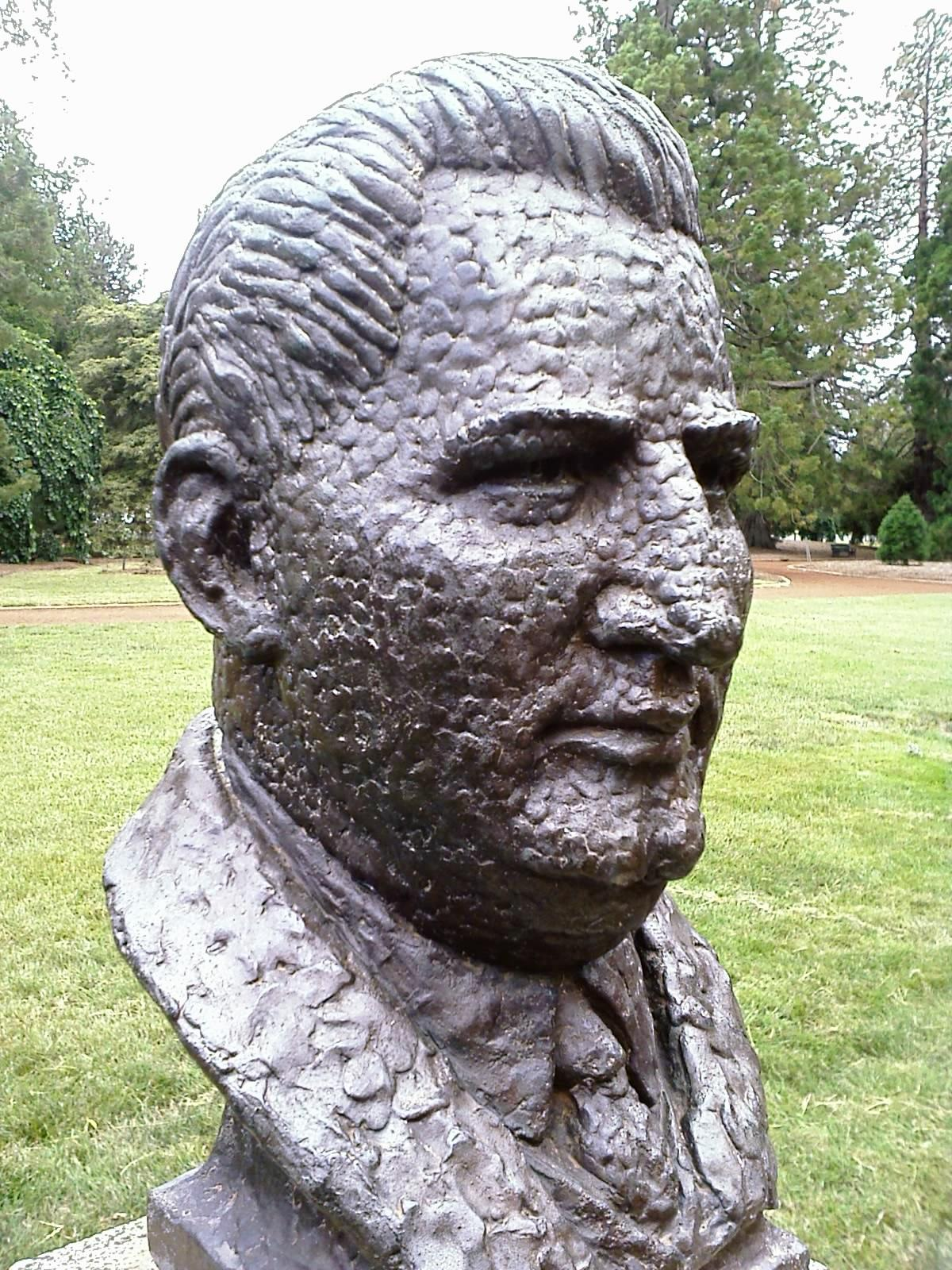
Bust of Arthur Fadden by sculptor Wallace Anderson located in the Prime Minister's Avenue in the Ballarat Botanical Gardens

Fadden was appointed to the Privy Council in 1942, which granted him the style "Right Honourable", and was made a Knight Commander of the Order of St Michael and St George (KCMG) in 1951. He was knighted in person by King George VI in London on 31 January 1952, only a week before the King's death, and formally sworn of the Privy Council the following day. In his memoirs he recalled that the King had accidentally knighted him as "Sir William" (his middle name). He corrected the King who knighted him again as "Sir Arthur". Fadden was raised to Knight Grand Cross (GCMG) of the order in 1958, to mark his retirement from politics. In 1972, he was made a Doctor of Laws honoris causa by the University of Queensland.

After Fadden's death, the Canberra suburb of Fadden and the federal electoral Division of Fadden in Queensland were named in his honour, as is traditional for Australian prime ministers. In 1975 he was honoured on a postage stamp bearing his portrait issued by Australia Post. In 1976, the Sir Arthur Fadden Memorial Garden was established in the Brisbane suburb of Mount Ommaney, consisting of 3,000 trees.

== See also ==
- Fadden Ministry

Parliament of Queensland
Preceded by Harry Bruce	Member for Kennedy; 1932–1935	Succeeded by Cecil Jesson
Parliament of Australia
Preceded by Littleton Groom	Member for Darling Downs; 1936–1949	Succeeded by Reginald Swartz
New division	Member for McPherson; 1949–1958	Succeeded by Charles Barnes
Political offices
Preceded by James Fairbairn	Minister for Air; 1940	Succeeded by John McEwen
Preceded by James Fairbairn	Minister for Civil Aviation; 1940	Succeeded by John McEwen
Preceded by Percy Spender	Minister Assisting the Treasurer; 1940	Succeeded by Larry Anthony
Preceded by Harold Holt	Minister Assisting the Minister for Supply and Development; 1940	Succeeded by Thomas Collins
Preceded by Robert Menzies	Treasurer of Australia; 1940–1941	Succeeded by Ben Chifley
Preceded by Robert Menzies	Prime Minister of Australia; 1941	Succeeded by John Curtin
Preceded by John Curtin	Leader of the Opposition of Australia; 1941–1943	Succeeded by Robert Menzies
Preceded by Ben Chifley	Treasurer of Australia; 1949–1958	Succeeded by Harold Holt
Party political offices
Preceded by Harold Thorby	Deputy Leader of the Country Party; 1940–1941	Succeeded by John McEwen
Preceded by Archie Cameron	Leader of the Country Party; 1941–1958	Succeeded by John McEwen
