= Division of Darling Downs =

Former Australian federal electoral division

Darling Downs Australian House of Representatives Division
- Created: 1901
- Abolished: 1984
- Namesake: Darling Downs

The Division of Darling Downs was an Australian electoral division in the state of Queensland. The division was proclaimed in 1900, and was one of the original 65 divisions to be contested at the first federal election. It was named after the Darling Downs region of Queensland, and consisted mainly of the city of Toowoomba and surrounding rural areas. The seat was safely conservative for its entire existence, almost always held by the Country Party (now called the National Party), or the Liberal Party and its predecessors. Its prominent members included Sir Littleton Groom, Cabinet minister and Speaker, and Arthur Fadden, Prime Minister of Australia in 1941.

The electorate's first member, William Henry Groom, died in the same year as the first Commonwealth Parliament meeting in Melbourne, in 1901. His death led to Australia's first by-election, which was won by his son Littleton. The seat was abolished in 1984, being replaced by the Division of Groom, named after the aforesaid Littleton Groom.

== Members ==
Image	Member	Party	Term	Notes
	William Henry Groom (1833–1901)	Protectionist	30 March 1901 – 8 August 1901	Previously held the Legislative Assembly of Queensland seat of Drayton and Toowoomba. Died in office. Son was Littleton Groom
	Sir Littleton Groom (1867–1936)	Protectionist	14 September 1901 – 26 May 1909	Served as minister under Deakin, Cook, Hughes and Bruce. Served as Speaker during the Bruce Government. Lost seat. Father was William Henry Groom
	Sir Littleton Groom (1867–1936)	Liberal	26 May 1909 – 17 February 1917	Served as minister under Deakin, Cook, Hughes and Bruce. Served as Speaker during the Bruce Government. Lost seat. Father was William Henry Groom
	Sir Littleton Groom (1867–1936)	Nationalist	17 February 1917 – September 1929	Served as minister under Deakin, Cook, Hughes and Bruce. Served as Speaker during the Bruce Government. Lost seat. Father was William Henry Groom
	Sir Littleton Groom (1867–1936)	Independent Nationalist	September 1929 – 12 October 1929	Served as minister under Deakin, Cook, Hughes and Bruce. Served as Speaker during the Bruce Government. Lost seat. Father was William Henry Groom
	Arthur Morgan (1881–1957)	Nationalist	12 October 1929 – 7 May 1931	Lost seat
	Arthur Morgan (1881–1957)	United Australia	7 May 1931 – 19 December 1931	Lost seat
	Sir Littleton Groom (1867–1936)	Independent	19 December 1931 – August 1933	Died in office. Father was William Henry Groom
	Sir Littleton Groom (1867–1936)	United Australia	August 1933 – 6 November 1936	Died in office. Father was William Henry Groom
	Arthur Fadden (1894–1973)	Country	19 December 1936 – 10 December 1949	Previously held the Legislative Assembly of Queensland seat of Kennedy. Served as minister under Menzies. Served as deputy prime minister under Menzies. Served as Prime Minister in 1941. Served as Opposition Leader from 1941 to 1943. Transferred to the Division of McPherson
	Sir Reginald Swartz (1911–2006)	Liberal	10 December 1949 – 2 November 1972	Served as minister under Menzies, Holt, McEwen, Gorton and McMahon. Retired
	Tom McVeigh (1930–)	Country	2 December 1972 – 2 May 1975	Served as minister under Fraser. Transferred to the Division of Groom after Darling Downs was abolished in 1984
	Tom McVeigh (1930–)	National Country	2 May 1975 – 16 October 1982	Served as minister under Fraser. Transferred to the Division of Groom after Darling Downs was abolished in 1984
	Tom McVeigh (1930–)	Nationals	16 October 1982 – 1 December 1984	Served as minister under Fraser. Transferred to the Division of Groom after Darling Downs was abolished in 1984
