= Littleton Groom =

Australian politician (1867–1936)

The Honourable Sir Littleton Groom KCMG KC
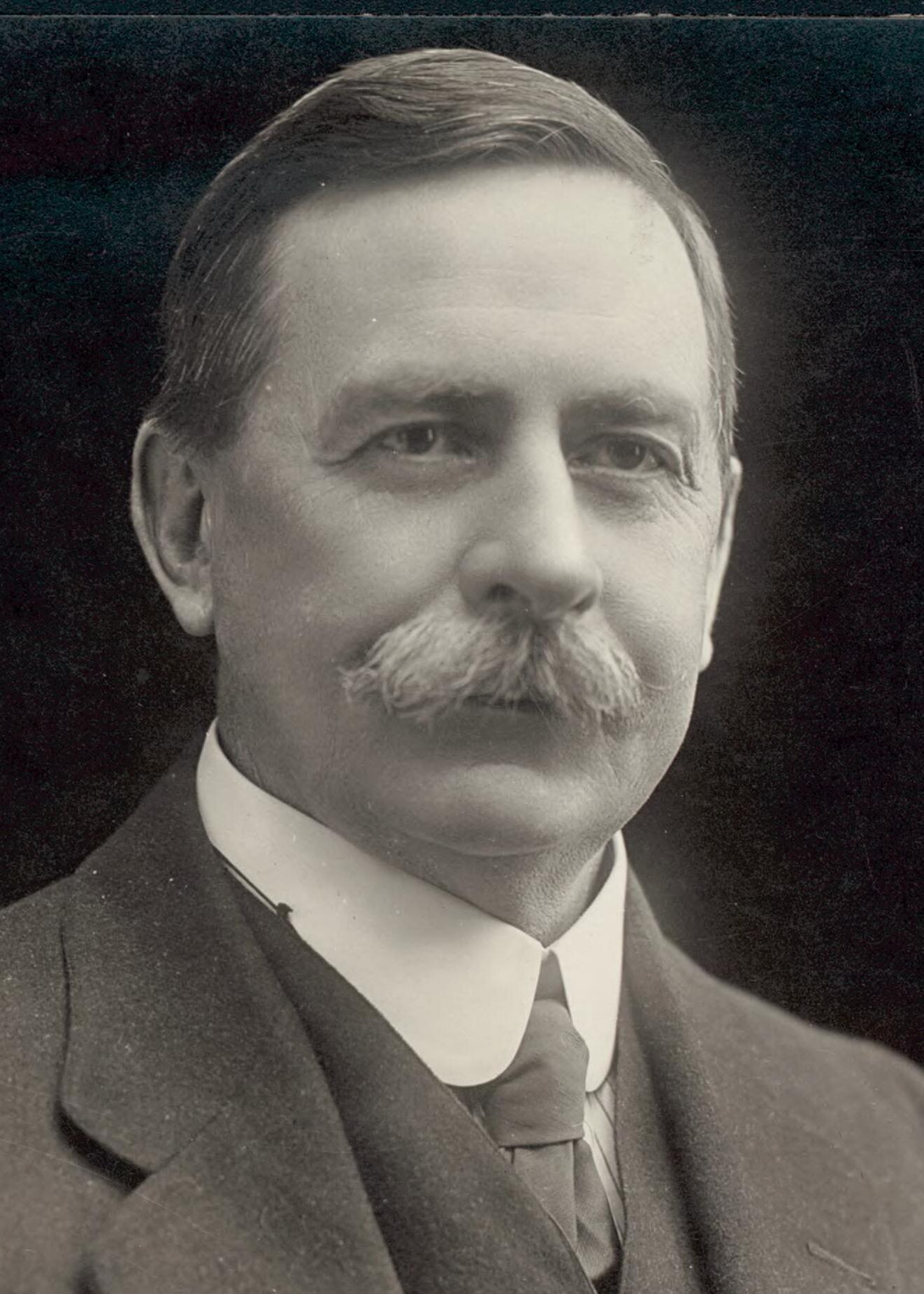

6th Speaker of the Australian House of Representatives
- In office 13 January 1926 – 11 October 1929
- Preceded by: William Watt
- Succeeded by: Norman Makin

Attorney-General of Australia
- In office 21 December 1921 – 18 December 1925
- Prime Minister: Billy Hughes; Stanley Bruce
- Preceded by: Billy Hughes
- Succeeded by: John Latham

Minister for Works and Railways
- In office 27 March 1918 – 21 December 1921
- Prime Minister: Billy Hughes
- Preceded by: William Watt
- Succeeded by: Richard Foster

Minister for Trade and Customs
- In office 24 June 1913 – 17 September 1914
- Prime Minister: Joseph Cook
- Preceded by: Frank Tudor
- Succeeded by: Frank Tudor

Minister for External Affairs
- In office 2 June 1909 – 29 April 1910
- Prime Minister: Alfred Deakin
- Preceded by: Lee Batchelor
- Succeeded by: Lee Batchelor

Attorney-General of Australia
- In office 12 October 1906 – 13 November 1908
- Prime Minister: Alfred Deakin
- Preceded by: Isaac Isaacs
- Succeeded by: Billy Hughes

Minister for Home Affairs
- In office 5 July 1905 – 12 October 1906
- Prime Minister: Alfred Deakin
- Preceded by: Dugald Thomson
- Succeeded by: Thomas Ewing

Member of the Australian Parliament for Darling Downs
- In office 19 December 1931 – 6 November 1936
- Preceded by: Arthur Morgan
- Succeeded by: Arthur Fadden
- In office 14 September 1901 – 12 October 1929
- Preceded by: William Henry Groom
- Succeeded by: Arthur Morgan

Personal details
- Born: Littleton Ernest Groom; 22 April 1867 Toowoomba, Queensland, Australia
- Died: 6 November 1936 (aged 69) Canberra, Australian Capital Territory, Australia
- Party: Protectionist (1901–09); Fusion (1909–17); Nationalist (1917–29); Independent (1929–33); UAP (1933–36)
- Spouse: Jessie Bell (m. 1894)
- Education: University of Melbourne
- Occupation: Lawyer

Sir Littleton Ernest Groom KCMG KC (22 April 1867 – 6 November 1936) was an Australian politician. He held ministerial office under four prime ministers between 1905 and 1925, and subsequently served as Speaker of the House of Representatives from 1926 to 1929.

Groom was the son of William Henry Groom, who had arrived in Australia as a convict but became a prominent public figure in the Colony of Queensland. He was a lawyer by profession, entering federal parliament at the 1901 Darling Downs by-election following his father's death. Groom was first appointed to cabinet by Alfred Deakin in 1905. Over the following two decades he served as Minister for Home Affairs (1905–1906), Attorney-General (1906–1908), External Affairs (1909–1910), Trade and Customs (1913–1914), Vice-President of the Executive Council (1917–1918), Works and Railways (1918–1921), and Attorney-General (1921–1925).

A political liberal and anti-socialist, Groom was initially affiliated with Deakin's Protectionists, who were later superseded by the Liberals (1909) and Nationalists (1917). He came into conflict with Prime Minister Stanley Bruce during the 1920s, and as speaker in 1929 refused to use his casting vote to save the government on a confidence motion. He was expelled from the Nationalists and lost his seat at the resulting election, but was re-elected in 1931 as an independent. He joined the United Australia Party (UAP) in 1933 and continued as a backbencher until his death in 1936.

== Early life ==
Groom was born on 22 April 1867 in Toowoomba, Queensland. He was the third son of Grace (née Littleton) and William Henry Groom. His English-born father had been transported to Australia as a convict in 1846, but became a successful businessman and public official, serving as mayor of Toowoomba and in the Queensland Legislative Assembly and Australian House of Representatives.

Groom attended Toowoomba North State School and Toowoomba Grammar School, where he was school dux and captain of the cricket and football teams. He went on to attend Ormond College at the University of Melbourne, winning scholarships and graduating Bachelor of Arts in 1889 and Bachelor of Laws in 1891. Groom subsequently returned to Queensland and practised as a barrister in Brisbane. He was "a leading figure in the Queensland University Extension Movement" and was also involved with the Brisbane Literary Circle and the Brisbane School of Arts. In 1900 he was appointed a deputy judge on the District Court of Queensland.

In July 1894, Groom married Jessie Bell, with whom he had two daughters.

== Politics ==
=== Early years ===
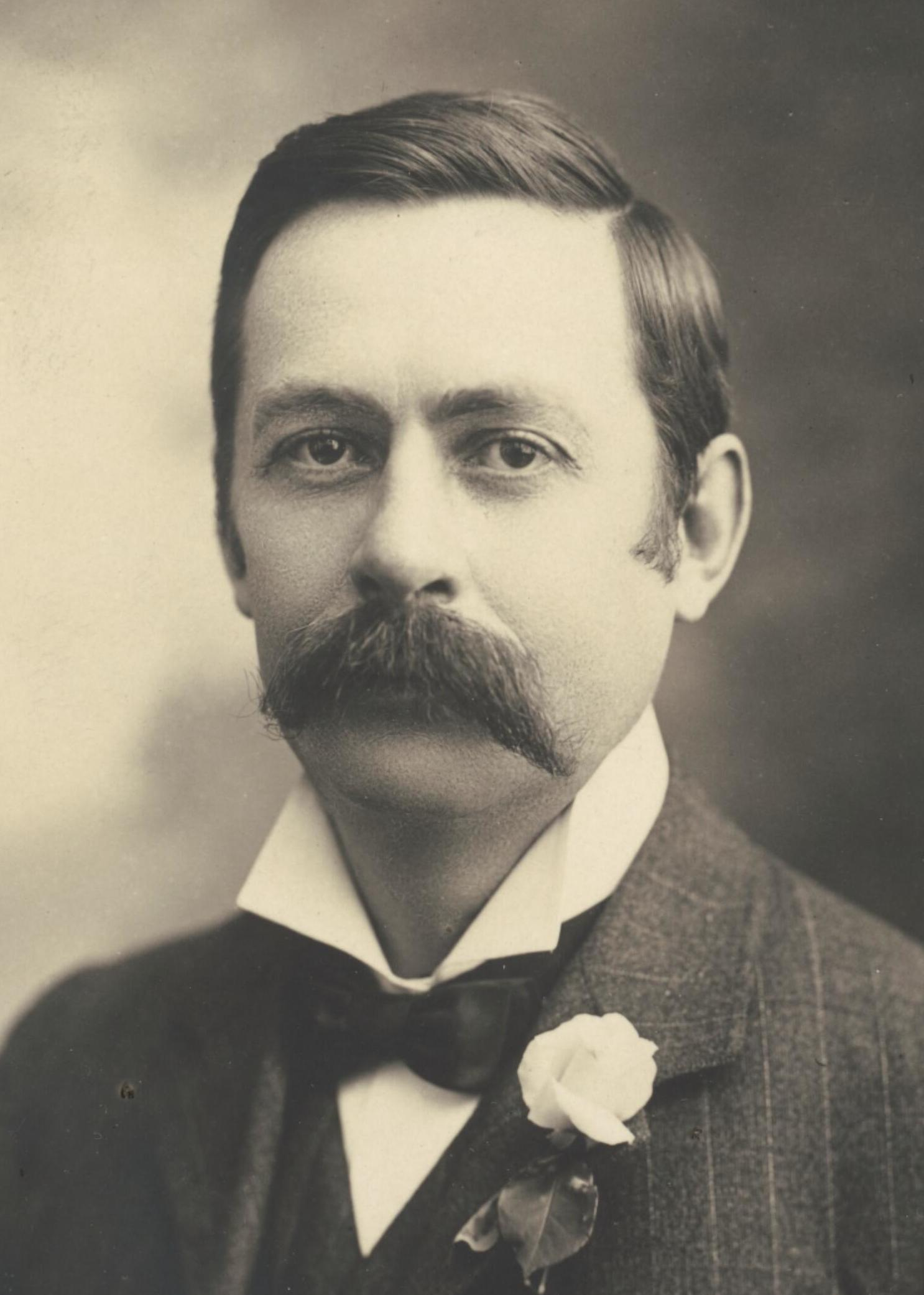
Groom early in his career

Groom's father was elected to the House of Representatives at the inaugural 1901 federal election, but in August 1901 became the first federal MP to die in office. His son quickly agreed to stand at the resulting by-election in the seat of Darling Downs. He was publicly endorsed by Prime Minister Edmund Barton, but the government provided little assistance and none of its members campaigned on his behalf. Groom was opposed by Joshua Thomas Bell, a conservative independent whose father had similarly been a colonial MP. His policy speech in Toowoomba called for federal co-ordination of agriculture, old-age pensions, and compulsory arbitration, although "his great emphasis was on the necessity of the White Australia policy". His margin of victory was smaller than his father's had been, though still comfortable, and in celebration his supporters pulled him and his wife through the streets of Toowoomba in a wagonette. He proclaimed that "liberalism has triumphed over conservatism, and [...] you have decided that Australia shall be white".

Groom joined the radical faction of Barton's Liberal Protectionist Party and his views were closely aligned with those of Alfred Deakin. He devoted his maiden speech to the topic of immigration, supporting a total ban on non-white immigration into Australia and declaring his opposition to miscegenation. In contrast to other rural MPs, Groom was a centralist who felt the federal government should use its full constitutional powers; he "frequently stressed federal parliamentarians should deal with things from a continental rather than a state viewpoint." He lobbied for the immediate creation of a High Court, arguing that it was essential to preserve the rights of smaller states.

In 1904, Groom supported Australian Labor Party (ALP) leader Chris Watson's amendment to the Conciliation and Arbitration Bill which would extend its reach to state railway employees. However, he voted with the Deakin government against Andrew Fisher's amendment, a vote which became a confidence motion and resulted in Deakin's resignation. Groom was subsequently one of seven Protectionists who gave regular support to the short-lived Watson government. After another change of government he was part of a group of Protectionists who sat on the opposition benches under Watson as leader of the opposition. In November 1904 he introduced the first successful private member's bill, passed as the Life Assurance Companies Act 1905, to regulate life insurance policies taken out on children under the age of 10.

=== Government minister ===
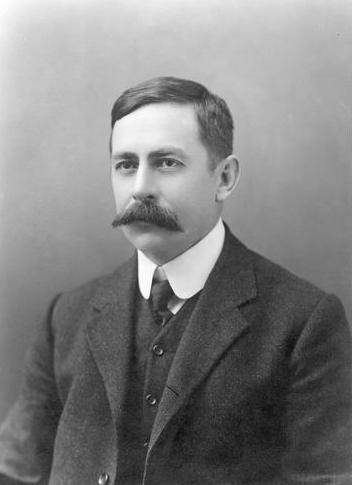
Groom c. 1910

In July 1905, Deakin replaced Reid as prime minister and appointed Groom as Minister for Home Affairs in the new ministry. His department had a number of responsibilities, including oversight of the Commonwealth Public Service, public works, federal elections, and the siting of the national capital. Although relatively young and inexperienced, he was one of the few Queenslanders considered suitable by Deakin and was also ideologically close to the ALP upon whose support the government depended.

One of Groom's first acts was to introduce the Census and Statistics Act 1905, establishing the Commonwealth Bureau of Census and Statistics as a complement to existing state bureaus of statistics. He correctly anticipated that the states would eventually hand over their offices to federal control, but his attempt to appoint Timothy Coghlan as the inaugural Commonwealth Statistician brought him into conflict with Joseph Carruthers, the premier of New South Wales. Groom also introduced the Meteorology Act 1906 to create the Bureau of Meteorology. Unlike the bureau of statistics, he had secured agreement from the states to cede control before introducing the legislation. His general philosophy was that "wherever the Commonwealth could satisfactorily perform a duty handled by the states it should be allowed to do so".

Groom's Lands Acquisition Act 1906 allowed for compulsory acquisition by the federal government and the granting of mining leases on federal land. In the same year he achieved agreement with the states over the valuation of properties transferred to the Commonwealth under section 69 of the constitution. Groom further clashed with Joseph Carruthers over the location of the capital, which the Watson government's Seat of Government Act 1904 had fixed as Dalgety, New South Wales. Rather than acquiescing, Carruthers instead offered three alternative sites closer to the state capital of Sydney. In December 1905, Groom introduced another bill which would have defined the limits of the capital district. During the second reading speech he accused the New South Wales state government of parochialism and obstructionism, which was poorly received. The bill was allowed to lapse and the issue was not resolved until the Seat of Government Act 1908 established Canberra as the new capital.

In October 1906, Groom became Attorney General until the defeat of the Deakin government in November 1908. Groom passed legislation to defend the Harvester Judgment and successfully introduced legislation providing Commonwealth invalid and old age pensions. He was closely involved with the implementation of the government's New Protection policy which sought to make government support for industry contingent on employers paying "fair and reasonable" wages.

With the formation of the Fusion government in June 1909, Groom became Minister for External Affairs until the Fusion's defeat in the 1910 election.

He had carried legislation establishing the High Commission of Australia in London. After the 1910 election, he became a strong opponent of Labor and attacked its establishment of a government-owned Commonwealth Bank and its attempt to gain the power to control monopolies. He was Trade and Customs in the Cook Ministry from June 1913 to September 1914.

Groom was Vice-President of the Executive Council in Hughes's Nationalist government from November 1917 to March 1918 and Works and Railways from March 1918 to December 1921. He encouraged railway development and was involved in accelerating the construction of Canberra.

In December 1921 he became Attorney-General again. He was Minister for Trade and Customs and Minister for Health in May and June 1924, following Austin Chapman's resignation on grounds of ill health. Groom led the 1924 Australian delegation to the Fifth Assembly of the League of Nations in Geneva and chaired a committee, which formulated a protocol to establish a system of international arbitration and later voted to support its protocol despite an instruction to abstain. Groom involved himself in attempts to deport "foreign" agitators, but due to his poor handling of these and other matters, he was obliged to resign in December 1925.

=== Speaker of the House ===
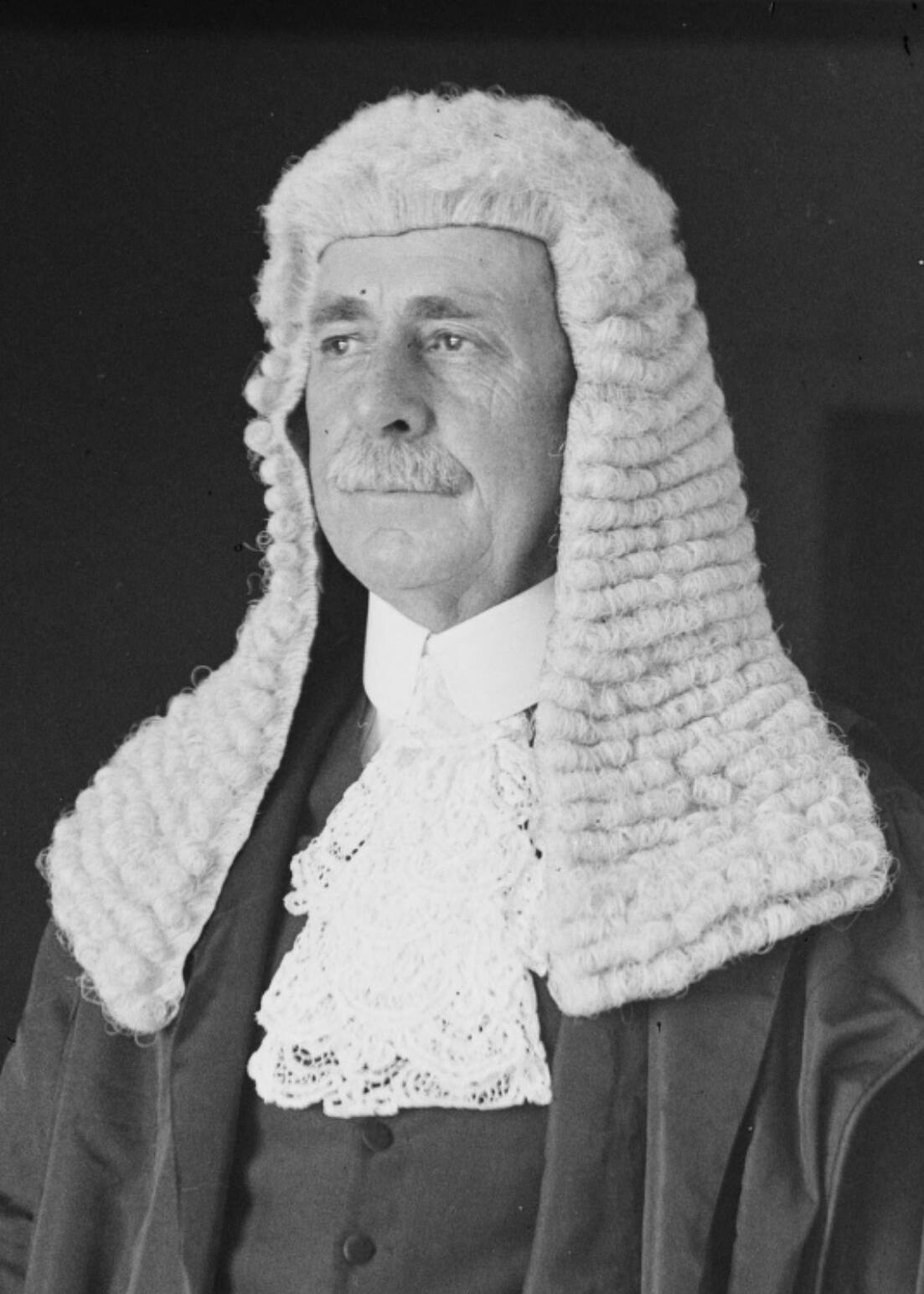
Groom as Speaker of the House in 1928

In return for his resignation, Groom was elected as Speaker of the House of Representatives and presided from January 1926 to 1929, when he helped oversee the move of federal Parliament from Melbourne to the newly constructed capital Canberra.

His refusal to use his tiebreaking vote as speaker on a bill that would remove the Commonwealth from most of its involvement in conciliation and arbitration led to the collapse of the Bruce government, triggering the 1929 election. His action was motivated partly by his views on the obligations of an independent speaker, but he also disliked the bill, and he still resented his forced resignation in 1925.

=== Final years ===
The Nationalists expelled Groom from the party, forcing him to run for reelection as an independent. In a bitter campaign, Groom was eliminated on the first count, making him the first serving Speaker to lose his own seat at an election.

Groom returned to his legal practice in Brisbane for two years. In 1931 election, he sought to take back his old seat. Running again as an independent, he handily defeated his successor, Arthur Morgan. In a reversal of two years earlier, he won an outright majority on the first count. After two years as an independent, he joined the United Australia Party, successor to the Nationalists, in August 1933. From 1932 to 1936 he was chairman of the Bankruptcy Legislation Committee and in earlier years he also acted on various royal commissions and select committees. He died in Canberra of cerebro-vascular disease. Groom was survived by his wife and one of their two daughters.

== Other activities ==
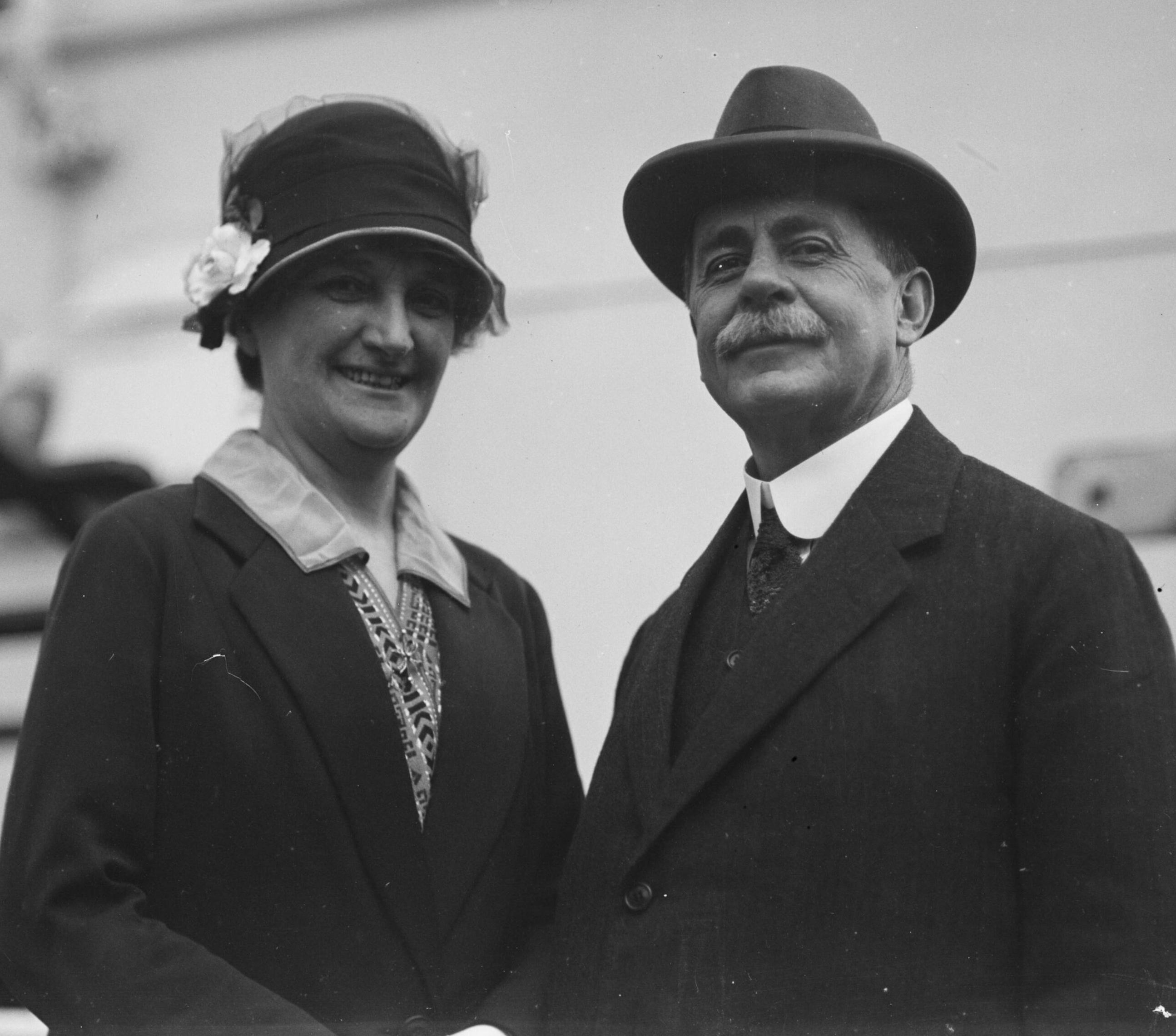
Groom in 1925 with his wife Jessie

Groom was joint author with Sir John Quick of the Judicial Power of the Commonwealth in 1904 and he was part author of various Queensland legal publications.

A member of the General Synod of the Anglican Church, Groom was knighted in January 1924 for his services to politics. In 1984, his old seat of Darling Downs was renamed the Division of Groom in his honour. He is commemorated by a number of features in Toowoomba, including Groom Park.

Groom's elder brother, Henry Littleton Groom, was a long serving member of the Queensland Legislative Council.

== Legacy ==
After his death, Groom bequeathed many of the books from his personal library to the Canberra University College Library (which would become the Australian National University's Chifley Library).

== See also ==
- Members of the Parliament of Australia who have served for at least 30 years
- Political families of Australia

Political offices
Preceded by Dugald Thomson	Minister for Home Affairs; 1905–1906	Succeeded by Thomas Ewing
Preceded by Isaac Isaacs	Attorney-General of Australia; 1906–1908	Succeeded by Billy Hughes
Preceded by Lee Batchelor	Minister for External Affairs; 1909–1910	Succeeded by Lee Batchelor
Preceded by Frank Tudor	Minister for Trade and Customs; 1913–1914	Succeeded by Frank Tudor
Preceded by Edward Millen	Vice-President of the Executive Council; 1917–1918	Succeeded by Edward Russell
Preceded by William Watt	Minister for Works and Railways; 1918–1921	Succeeded by Richard Foster
Preceded by Billy Hughes	Attorney-General of Australia; 1921–1925	Succeeded by John Latham
Preceded by Austin Chapman	Minister for Trade and Customs; Minister for Health; 1924	Succeeded by Herbert Pratten
Parliament of Australia
Preceded by William Watt	Speaker of the Australian House of Representatives; 1926–1929	Succeeded by Norman Makin
Preceded by William Henry Groom	Member for Darling Downs; 1901–1929	Succeeded by Arthur Morgan
Preceded by Arthur Morgan	Member for Darling Downs; 1931–1936	Succeeded by Arthur Fadden
