= Earth in Flower =

Earth in Flower - The Divine Mystery of the Cambodian Dance Drama
- Earth in Flower - The Divine Mystery of the Cambodian Dance Drama
- Author: Paul Cravath
- Cover artist: Jean Despujols
- Language: English
- Genre: Non-fiction History
- Published: May 2008 DatASIA (US)
- Publication place: United States
- Media type: Print (Hardback & Paperback)
- Pages: 544 pp - Includes bibliography and index
- ISBN: 978-1-934431-28-3 (US hardback edition)
- OCLC: 232161171
- LC Class: GV1703.C3 C73 2007

Earth in Flower is a 2008 book, a historical analysis of Khmer classical dance formerly known as the Royal Ballet of Cambodia. Over the past millennium, the women performers were living goddesses, priestesses, performers, queens, concubines, hostages and diplomats.

== Research history ==
A wartime twist of fate during Cambodia's tumultuous Lon Nol regime made University of Hawaiʻi researcher Paul Cravath one of the only Westerners in history to gain full access to the formerly sequestered troupe of royal dancers, their teachers, theater and archives. Following primary research in Cambodia, Thailand and Laos, the author spent ten years doing archival and primary research in the United States. After submitting the study as his doctoral thesis, the paper was only seen by a handful of researchers on microfilm available from UMI.

The primary sources that the Cambodian Ministry of Culture made available to the author were themselves unique. Even more critical was the time he gathered the information; between January and April, 1975. The author escaped Phnom Penh on a military transport with his research intact on April 6, 1975; the city fell to the Khmer Rouge on April 15, beginning one of the most destructive genocides in human history. Under the Khmer Rouge, most of the people and archives the author accessed were destroyed. It is estimated that 90% of Cambodia's dancers and teachers perished.

Beginning in 2005, the publisher and author collaborated to issue a publicly available edition of this research to add to the cultural record of the Cambodian people. The book edition of Earth in Flower contains the complete original thesis with additional photos, new graphics, and supplemental information.

== Cover ==
The Meadows Museum of Art granted permission to feature Jean Despujols's artwork on the cover of Earth in Flower.

In the 1930s, Saem was a dancer with Princess Wongat Say Sangvann’s royal troupe in Phnom Penh. The princess married the youngest son of King Sisowath Monivong, Prince Yong Kath, when she herself was a royal dancer. Saem’s skill impressed the princess, who adopted her as a foster child. In 1937, Despujols painted Saem on the Rainbow Bridge at Angkor Wat where special dance performances were held; she holds her right hand in the classic gesture symbolizing a flower.

The interior page layout concept for this book was designed and developed by Sue Balcer.

Saem's "Cinderella story" embodies the history of the Cambodian dance tradition and the hope of Cambodia’s future. In ancient times, girls from all levels of society pledged their service to temples and to learning the dance. Saem's devotion to the art led to her royal adoption. Her story speaks to the modern Spirit of Cambodia, empowering women and men from every level in society to participate in the Khmer Renaissance.

== Books and articles citing Earth in Flower ==
- Apsara: The Feminine in Cambodian Art by Amy Catlin. JSTOR Asian Music, Vol. 22, No. 1 (Autumn, 1990 - Winter, 1991), pages 173-174.
- The Cambridge Guide to Asian Theatre by James R. Brandon, 1993.
- Dance in Cambodia by Toni Samantha Phim, Ashley Thompson, 2000. ISBN 978-983-56-0059-3
- Dance of Life by Julie B. Mehta, 2001. ISBN 978-981-218-085-8
- Domesticating the Empire: Race, Gender, and Family Life in French and Dutch Colonialism Edited by Julia Ann Clancy-Smith, Frances Gouda, 1998. ISBN 978-0-8139-1781-8
- Khmer Court Dance JSTOR, Asian Music, Volume 25, Number 1/2, 25th Anniversary Double Issue (1993 - 1994), pages 322-326
- Ethnomusicology by Helen Myers, 1993. ISBN 0-393-03378-3
- "Female Imagery in Ancient Khmer Sculpture," by Dr. Robert L. Brown in Apsara: The Feminine in Khmer Art, ed. Amy Catlin (Los Angeles: the Woman's Building, 1987):6-10
- Oxford Journals: The Changing Religious Beliefs and Ritual Practices among Cambodians in Diaspora by Chean Rithy Men, 2002.
- PDF - Selected Resources - People from Cambodia, Laos & Vietnam Compiled by Judy Lewis, 1993.
- Sasagawa Hideo: Post/colonial Discourses on the Cambodian Court Dance Southeast Asian Studies, Volume 42, Number 4, March 2005
- Southeast Asian Languages and Literatures: A Bibliographical Guide to... By Ernst Ulrich Kratz, 2002.
