= Arthur Morgan (Australian politician, born 1881) =

Australian politician

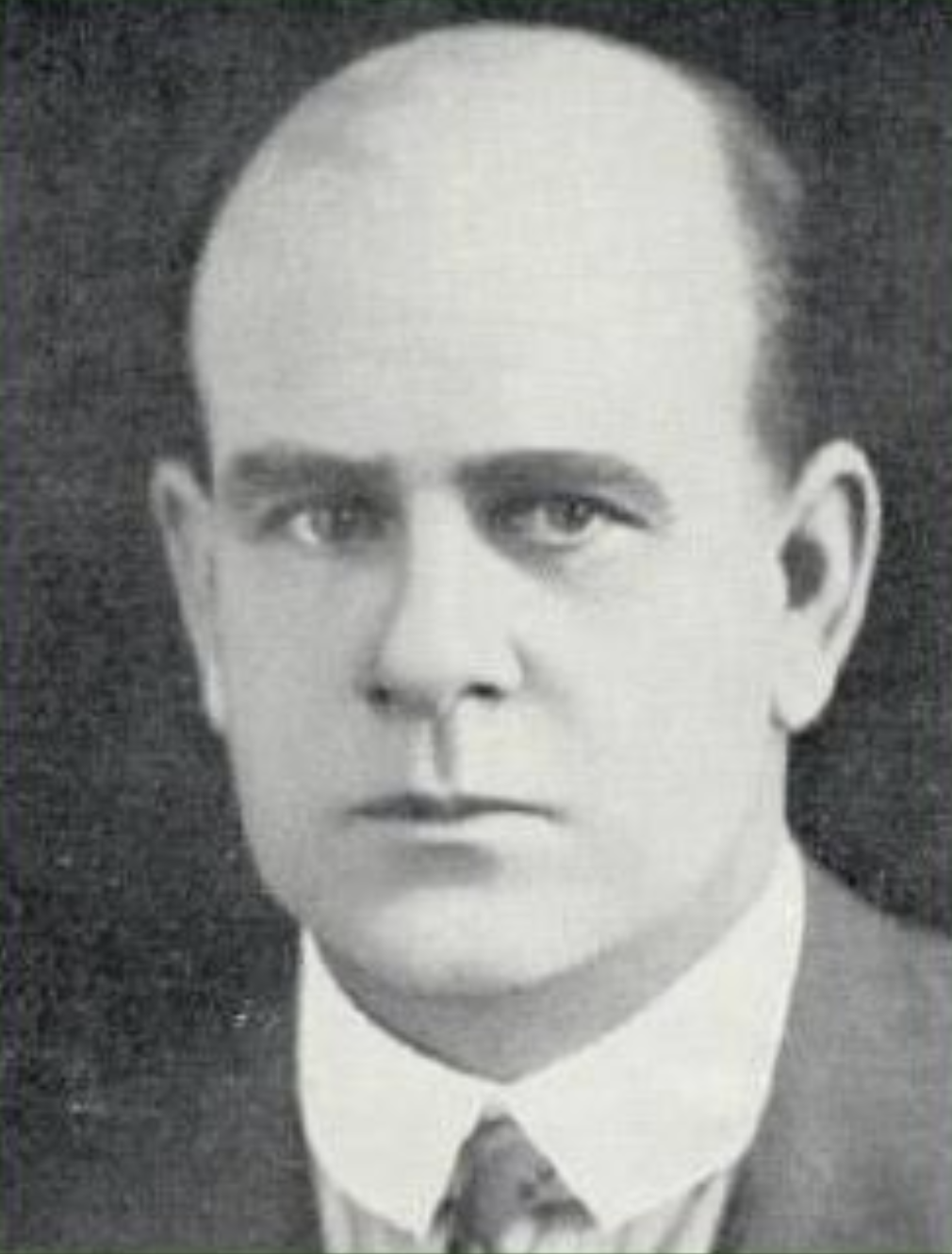

Member of the Australian Parliament for Darling Downs
- In office 12 October 1929 – 19 December 1931
- Preceded by: Littleton Groom
- Succeeded by: Littleton Groom

Personal details
- Born: 1881 Warwick, Queensland
- Died: 2 August 1957 (aged 75–76)
- Party: Nationalist Party of Australia
- Relations: Arthur Morgan (father) James Morgan (grandfather)
- Occupation: Associate editor

Arthur Clinton Morgan (1881 – 2 August 1957) was an Australian politician. He was a Nationalist Party member of the Australian House of Representatives from 1929 to 1931, representing the electorate of Darling Downs.

Morgan was born at Warwick, son of Premier of Queensland Sir Arthur Morgan and grandson of Queensland colonial MP James Morgan. He received a state school education at Warwick and was attached to the staff of the state Hansard and the state parliament for several years until c. 1904 before going to work for his family's newspaper, the Warwick Argus, as an apprentice journalist and then a sub-editor from 1910 to 1914, after which his family sold the newspaper. He served a term as a Town of Warwick councillor and was an unsuccessful Kidstonite candidate for the Legislative Assembly in 1908.

Morgan enlisted for service in World War I on 7 February 1915 and embarked with the 11th Light Horse Regiment reinforcements on 2 June 1915. He served in the Gallipoli campaign and in Palestine before being invalided home in early 1917. After the war, he returned to journalism, initially as associate editor of the Daily Mail in Brisbane from 1918 to 1921, then as editor of the new Graziers' Review from 1921 to 1927, and finally as editor of the Brisbane Sun from 1927 until his election to parliament.

In 1929, Morgan was elected to the Australian House of Representatives as the Nationalist member for Darling Downs, defeating sitting member Littleton Groom, who was running as an independent. He was a member of the Select Committee on the Tobacco Industry from 1923 to 1930. He held the seat until his defeat by Groom, again running as an independent, in 1931.

He was touted as a potential candidate for seats in the early-to-mid-1930s, but this did nor occur. Morgan died in 1957.

He married Anna Hobbs in 1907; they had two sons and two daughters.

Parliament of Australia
Preceded by Littleton Groom	Member for Darling Downs; 1929 – 1931	Succeeded by Littleton Groom
