= Electoral results for the Division of Maranoa =

Division election results

This is a list of electoral results for the Division of Maranoa in Australian federal elections from the division's creation in 1901 until the present.

== Members ==
Member	Party	Term
Jim Page	Labor	1901–1921
James Hunter	Country	1921–1940
Frank Baker	Labor	1940–1943
Charles Adermann	Country	1943–1949
Charles Russell	Country	1949–1950
Charles Russell	Independent	1950–1951
Wilfred Brimblecombe	Country	1951–1966
James Corbett	Country	1966–1980
Ian Cameron	National	1980–1990
Bruce Scott	National	1990–2010
Bruce Scott	Liberal National	2010–2016
David Littleproud	Liberal National	2016–present

== Election results ==
=== Elections in the 2020s ===
==== 2025 ====
2025 Australian federal election: Maranoa
Party	Candidate	Votes	%	±%
People First	Rod Draper			
Liberal National	David Littleproud			
Greens	Elizabeth Johnston			
Libertarian	Michael Offerdahl			
Family First	John Matthew Whittle			
Labor	Alex Newman			
Trumpet of Patriots	Jonathan Allen Cumes			
One Nation	Sharon Duncan			
Total formal votes				
Informal votes				
Turnout				

==== 2022 ====
2022 Australian federal election: Maranoa
Party	Candidate	Votes	%	±%
Liberal National	David Littleproud	52,382	56.26	+0.26
Labor	Dave Kerrigan	14,236	15.29	−0.26
One Nation	Mike Kelly	11,070	11.89	−2.73
United Australia	Nathan McDonald	6,202	6.66	+3.03
Greens	Ellisa Parker	4,533	4.87	+1.45
Shooters, Fishers, Farmers	Malcolm Richardson	3,695	3.97	+3.97
Federation	Brett Tunbridge	997	1.07	+1.07
Total formal votes		93,115	96.64	+0.59
Informal votes		3,234	3.36	−0.59
Turnout		96,349	88.39	−3.54
Two-party-preferred result
Liberal National	David Littleproud	67,153	72.12	−3.30
Labor	Dave Kerrigan	25,962	27.88	+3.30
Liberal National hold		Swing	−3.30	

Alluvial diagram for preference flows in the seat of Maranoa in the 2022 federal election. The winning candidate got over 50% of first preference votes, so this alluvial diagram is indicative only, and preference flows were not used to determine the final result. The preference flows were used to determine the two-candidate-preferred.

=== Elections in the 2010s ===
==== 2019 ====
2019 Australian federal election: Maranoa
Party	Candidate	Votes	%	±%
Liberal National	David Littleproud	51,950	56.00	+6.81
Labor	Linda Little	14,427	15.55	−2.72
One Nation	Rosemary Moulden	13,564	14.62	−3.20
Katter's Australian	Anthony Wallis	4,245	4.58	−0.20
United Australia	Julie Saunders	3,367	3.63	+3.63
Greens	Emmeline Chidley	3,177	3.43	+0.03
Conservative National	Darren Christiansen	2,030	2.19	+2.19
Total formal votes		92,760	96.05	+1.58
Informal votes		3,813	3.95	−1.58
Turnout		96,573	91.93	−0.71
Notional two-party-preferred count
Liberal National	David Littleproud	69,961	75.42	+7.88
Labor	Linda Little	22,799	24.58	−7.88
Two-candidate-preferred result
Liberal National	David Littleproud	67,239	72.49	+6.63
One Nation	Rosemary Moulden	25,521	27.51	−6.63
Liberal National hold		Swing	+6.63	

==== 2016 ====
2016 Australian federal election: Maranoa
Party	Candidate	Votes	%	±%
Liberal National	David Littleproud	44,297	49.19	−8.23
Labor	Dave Kerrigan	16,456	18.27	+1.98
One Nation	Lynette Keehn	16,047	17.82	+17.82
Katter's Australian	Rick Gurnett	4,306	4.78	−0.81
Greens	Katherine Hompes	3,056	3.39	+0.32
Family First	Myfanwy Schenk	2,905	3.23	+0.47
CountryMinded	Luke Arbuckle	2,141	2.38	+2.38
Rise Up Australia	Sherrilyn Church	841	0.93	−0.03
Total formal votes		90,049	94.47	−1.14
Informal votes		5,269	5.53	+1.14
Turnout		95,318	92.74	−1.66
Notional two-party-preferred count
Liberal National	David Littleproud	60,821	67.54	−4.74
Labor	Dave Kerrigan	29,228	32.46	+4.74
Two-candidate-preferred result
Liberal National	David Littleproud	59,308	65.86	−6.42
One Nation	Lynette Keehn	30,741	34.14	+34.14
Liberal National hold		Swing	N/A	

==== 2013 ====
2013 Australian federal election: Maranoa
Party	Candidate	Votes	%	±%
Liberal National	Bruce Scott	51,622	57.42	−8.10
Labor	Nick Cedric-Thompson	14,649	16.29	−3.67
Palmer United	John Bjelke-Petersen	12,506	13.91	+13.91
Katter's Australian	Rowell Walton	5,027	5.59	+5.59
Greens	Grant Newson	2,762	3.07	−2.08
Family First	John Spellman	2,481	2.76	−1.33
Rise Up Australia	George Clouston	861	0.96	+0.96
Total formal votes		89,908	95.61	+0.55
Informal votes		4,124	4.39	−0.55
Turnout		94,032	94.40	+0.75
Two-party-preferred result
Liberal National	Bruce Scott	64,987	72.28	−0.61
Labor	Nick Cedric-Thompson	24,921	27.72	+0.61
Liberal National hold		Swing	−0.61	

==== 2010 ====
2010 Australian federal election: Maranoa
Party	Candidate	Votes	%	±%
Liberal National	Bruce Scott	57,100	65.52	+7.00
Labor	Geoff Keating	17,398	19.96	−9.94
Independent	Charles Nason	4,597	5.28	+5.28
Greens	Grant Newson	4,490	5.15	+1.94
Family First	Greg McKay	3,560	4.09	+0.35
Total formal votes		87,145	95.06	−1.26
Informal votes		4,530	4.94	+1.26
Turnout		91,675	93.59	−1.33
Two-party-preferred result
Liberal National	Bruce Scott	63,520	72.89	+8.83
Labor	Geoff Keating	23,625	27.11	−8.83
Liberal National hold		Swing	+8.83	

=== Elections in the 2000s ===
==== 2007 ====
2007 Australian federal election: Maranoa
Party	Candidate	Votes	%	±%
National	Bruce Scott	46,293	58.57	+10.75
Labor	Mike Bathersby	23,288	29.46	+7.65
Family First	David Totenhofer	3,034	3.84	−0.15
One Nation	Rod Watson	2,774	3.51	−1.61
Greens	Bob East	2,646	3.35	+1.10
Democrats	Alan Dickson	1,004	1.27	+0.14
Total formal votes		79,039	96.44	+1.38
Informal votes		2,920	3.56	−1.38
Turnout		81,959	94.47	−0.87
Two-party-preferred result
National	Bruce Scott	50,936	64.44	−6.61
Labor	Mike Bathersby	28,103	35.56	+6.61
National hold		Swing	−6.61	

==== 2004 ====
2004 Australian federal election: Maranoa
Party	Candidate	Votes	%	±%
National	Bruce Scott	47,846	60.51	+7.40
Labor	Shane Guley	17,636	22.30	−1.84
One Nation	Santo Ferraro	3,535	4.47	−10.13
Family First	Stephen Moloney	3,067	3.88	+3.88
Independent	Philip Black	2,570	3.25	+3.25
New Country	Rick Benham	1,654	2.09	+2.09
Greens	Jonathan Rihan	1,580	2.00	+0.08
Democrats	Greg Ridge	903	1.14	−2.54
Citizens Electoral Council	David Klingsporn	280	0.35	−0.43
Total formal votes		79,071	95.24	−0.08
Informal votes		3,955	4.76	+0.08
Turnout		83,026	94.48	−1.72
Two-party-preferred result
National	Bruce Scott	56,085	70.93	+5.55
Labor	Shane Guley	22,986	29.07	−5.55
National hold		Swing	+5.55	

==== 2001 ====
2001 Australian federal election: Maranoa
Party	Candidate	Votes	%	±%
National	Bruce Scott	41,685	54.92	+9.73
Labor	David Bowden	17,696	23.32	−1.80
One Nation	Mark McNichol	11,429	15.06	−7.34
Democrats	Rhonda Wilson	2,977	3.92	+1.12
Greens	Noel Nemeth	1,512	1.99	+0.58
Citizens Electoral Council	Cindy Rolls	600	0.79	+0.47
Total formal votes		75,899	95.31	−0.93
Informal votes		3,732	4.69	+0.93
Turnout		79,631	95.53	
Two-party-preferred result
National	Bruce Scott	50,103	66.01	+1.59
Labor	David Bowden	25,796	33.99	−1.59
National hold		Swing	+1.59	

=== Elections in the 1990s ===
==== 1998 ====
1998 Australian federal election: Maranoa
Party	Candidate	Votes	%	±%
National	Bruce Scott	34,075	45.19	−21.48
Labor	Elizabeth Pommer	18,936	25.11	+1.14
One Nation	Robyn Cadzow	16,892	22.40	+22.40
Democrats	Regina Gleeson	2,114	2.80	−3.16
Independent	Lorraine Wheeldon	2,076	2.75	+2.75
Greens	Kim Olsen	1,066	1.41	+1.29
Citizens Electoral Council	Peter Miller	243	0.32	+0.32
Total formal votes		75,402	96.24	−0.80
Informal votes		2,944	3.76	+0.80
Turnout		78,346	94.58	−0.81
Two-party-preferred result
National	Bruce Scott	48,576	64.42	−7.07
Labor	Elizabeth Pommer	26,826	35.58	+7.07
National hold		Swing	−7.07	

==== 1996 ====
1996 Australian federal election: Maranoa
Party	Candidate	Votes	%	±%
National	Bruce Scott	53,867	70.49	+17.06
Labor	Bob Murray	16,066	21.02	−4.05
Democrats	Alan May	4,630	6.06	+3.43
Indigenous Peoples	Franklin Beatty	1,855	2.43	+1.62
Total formal votes		76,418	97.02	−0.12
Informal votes		2,348	2.98	+0.12
Turnout		78,766	95.39	−0.34
Two-party-preferred result
National	Bruce Scott	57,792	75.73	+7.59
Labor	Bob Murray	18,526	24.27	−7.59
National hold		Swing	+7.59	

==== 1993 ====
1993 Australian federal election: Maranoa
Party	Candidate	Votes	%	±%
National	Bruce Scott	41,502	53.43	+6.42
Labor	Anne Jones	19,475	25.07	−5.47
Liberal	Gerard Clarke	6,859	8.83	−4.80
Confederate Action	Andrew Chambers	3,703	4.77	+4.77
Independent	Brian Hooper	2,248	2.89	+2.89
Democrats	Danny Dutton	2,039	2.63	−5.54
Greens	Sarah Moles	1,217	1.57	+1.57
Indigenous Peoples	Rose Turnbull	626	0.81	+0.81
Total formal votes		77,669	97.14	−0.74
Informal votes		2,288	2.86	+0.74
Turnout		79,957	95.73	
Two-party-preferred result
National	Bruce Scott	52,874	68.13	+4.64
Labor	Anne Jones	24,731	31.87	−4.64
National hold		Swing	+4.64	

==== 1990 ====
1990 Australian federal election: Maranoa
Party	Candidate	Votes	%	±%
National	Bruce Scott	31,594	47.7	−7.8
Labor	John Adams	20,716	31.3	−0.8
Liberal	John Stone	8,373	12.6	−7.8
Democrats	Mary Hopkins	5,567	8.4	+4.3
Total formal votes		66,250	97.8	
Informal votes		1,469	2.2	
Turnout		67,719	94.7	
Two-party-preferred result
National	Bruce Scott	41,838	63.2	−1.7
Labor	John Adams	24,351	36.8	+1.7
National hold		Swing	−1.7	

=== Elections in the 1980s ===
==== 1987 ====
1987 Australian federal election: Maranoa
Party	Candidate	Votes	%	±%
National	Ian Cameron	35,594	55.5	−7.4
Labor	Raymond Paroz	20,596	32.1	+0.6
Liberal	Bruce Christie	5,364	8.4	+8.4
Democrats	Richard McCarthy	2,605	4.1	−1.5
Total formal votes		64,159	95.9	
Informal votes		2,728	4.1	
Turnout		66,887	93.1	
Two-party-preferred result
National	Ian Cameron	41,604	64.9	−0.6
Labor	Raymond Paroz	22,550	35.1	+0.6
National hold		Swing	−0.6	

==== 1984 ====
1984 Australian federal election: Maranoa
Party	Candidate	Votes	%	±%
National	Ian Cameron	38,132	62.9	+2.6
Labor	Dave Summers	19,084	31.5	−1.4
Democrats	Mike Brannigan	3,384	5.6	−1.2
Total formal votes		60,600	95.1	
Informal votes		3,121	4.9	
Turnout		63,721	93.6	
Two-party-preferred result
National	Ian Cameron	39,690	65.5	+1.9
Labor	Dave Summers	20,910	34.5	−1.9
National hold		Swing	+1.9	

==== 1983 ====
1983 Australian federal election: Maranoa
Party	Candidate	Votes	%	±%
National	Ian Cameron	39,591	62.9	+5.6
Labor	Warren Keats	19,057	30.3	+0.8
Democrats	Austin Brannigan	4,300	6.8	+2.9
Total formal votes		62,948	98.9	
Informal votes		723	1.1	
Turnout		63,671	93.7	
Two-party-preferred result
National	Ian Cameron		66.2	−0.9
Labor	Warren Keats		33.8	+0.9
National hold		Swing	−0.9	

==== 1980 ====
1980 Australian federal election: Maranoa
Party	Candidate	Votes	%	±%
National Country	Ian Cameron	35,035	57.3	−11.4
Labor	Kenneth Abbey	18,047	29.5	+5.8
Liberal	Reginald Kerslake	5,655	9.2	+9.2
Democrats	Austin Brannigan	2,412	3.9	+0.6
Total formal votes		61,149	98.5	
Informal votes		902	1.5	
Turnout		62,051	94.5	
Two-party-preferred result
National Country	Ian Cameron		67.1	−6.5
Labor	Kenneth Abbey		32.9	+6.5
National Country hold		Swing	−6.5	

=== Elections in the 1970s ===
==== 1977 ====
1977 Australian federal election: Maranoa
Party	Candidate	Votes	%	±%
National Country	James Corbett	41,466	68.7	−1.9
Labor	John Kidman	14,320	23.7	−1.8
Democrats	Betty Whitworth	2,012	3.3	+3.3
Independent	Christopher Caldwell	1,663	2.8	+2.8
Progress	Maurice Fountain	879	1.5	−2.4
Total formal votes		60,340	98.5	
Informal votes		925	1.5	
Turnout		61,265	95.3	
Two-party-preferred result
National Country	James Corbett		73.6	−0.1
Labor	John Kidman		26.4	+0.1
National Country hold		Swing	−0.1	

==== 1975 ====
1975 Australian federal election: Maranoa
Party	Candidate	Votes	%	±%
National Country	James Corbett	30,158	68.8	+0.1
Labor	Reuben Coupe	11,962	27.3	−4.0
Workers	Lindsay Sturgess	1,688	3.9	+3.9
Total formal votes		43,808	98.8	
Informal votes		515	1.2	
Turnout		44,323	95.5	
Two-party-preferred result
National Country	James Corbett		71.9	+3.2
Labor	Reuben Coupe		28.1	−3.2
National Country hold		Swing	+3.2	

==== 1974 ====
1974 Australian federal election: Maranoa
Party	Candidate	Votes	%	±%
Country	James Corbett	30,104	68.7	+12.1
Labor	Janice Saltau	13,721	31.3	−4.9
Total formal votes		43,825	98.8	
Informal votes		535	1.2	
Turnout		44,360	95.1	
Country hold		Swing	+6.7	

==== 1972 ====
1972 Australian federal election: Maranoa
Party	Candidate	Votes	%	±%
Country	James Corbett	22,863	56.6	+1.2
Labor	Timothy Walker	14,615	36.2	−2.3
Democratic Labor	Harry Green	2,327	5.8	−0.3
Independent	James Dwyer	595	1.5	+1.5
Total formal votes		40,400	98.2	
Informal votes		722	1.8	
Turnout		41,122	94.6	
Two-party-preferred result
Country	James Corbett		62.0	+1.7
Labor	Timothy Walker		38.0	−1.7
Country hold		Swing	+1.7	

=== Elections in the 1960s ===
==== 1969 ====
1969 Australian federal election: Maranoa
Party	Candidate	Votes	%	±%
Country	James Corbett	23,413	55.4	−5.4
Labor	Edward Bertolotti	16,283	38.5	+8.3
Democratic Labor	John Davis	2,576	6.1	−2.9
Total formal votes		42,272	99.0	
Informal votes		420	1.0	
Turnout		42,692	93.9	
Two-party-preferred result
Country	James Corbett		60.3	−7.7
Labor	Edward Bertolotti		39.7	+7.7
Country hold		Swing	−7.7	

==== 1966 ====
1966 Australian federal election: Maranoa
Party	Candidate	Votes	%	±%
Country	James Corbett	22,656	59.5	+4.7
Labor	Jack Tonkin	11,974	31.5	−10.9
Democratic Labor	Bryan Hurley	3,419	9.0	+6.2
Total formal votes		38,049	98.5	
Informal votes		582	1.5	
Turnout		38,631	94.0	
Two-party-preferred result
Country	James Corbett		66.7	+9.7
Labor	Jack Tonkin		33.3	−9.7
Country hold		Swing	+9.7	

==== 1963 ====
1963 Australian federal election: Maranoa
Party	Candidate	Votes	%	±%
Country	Wilfred Brimblecombe	20,649	54.8	+7.3
Labor	Trevor Alexander	15,965	42.4	−1.9
Democratic Labor	Mervyn Eunson	1,054	2.8	−5.4
Total formal votes		37,668	98.4	
Informal votes		627	1.6	
Turnout		38,295	93.6	
Two-party-preferred result
Country	Wilfred Brimblecombe		57.0	+3.4
Labor	Trevor Alexander		43.0	−3.4
Country hold		Swing	+3.4	

==== 1961 ====
1961 Australian federal election: Maranoa
Party	Candidate	Votes	%	±%
Country	Wilfred Brimblecombe	17,554	47.5	−4.3
Labor	Trevor Alexander	16,390	44.3	+10.0
Queensland Labor	Bryan Hurley	3,013	8.2	−5.7
Total formal votes		36,957	98.5	
Informal votes		563	1.5	
Turnout		37,520	92.5	
Two-party-preferred result
Country	Wilfred Brimblecombe	19,823	53.6	−9.3
Labor	Trevor Alexander	17,134	46.4	+9.3
Country hold		Swing	−9.3	

=== Elections in the 1950s ===
==== 1958 ====
1958 Australian federal election: Maranoa
Party	Candidate	Votes	%	±%
Country	Wilfred Brimblecombe	18,699	51.8	+7.2
Labor	Leslie Beaumont	12,384	34.3	+34.3
Queensland Labor	Alfred Dohring	5,027	13.9	+13.9
Total formal votes		36,110	98.2	
Informal votes		660	1.8	
Turnout		36,770	92.0	
Two-party-preferred result
Country	Wilfred Brimblecombe		62.9	+11.8
Labor	Leslie Beaumont		37.1	+37.1
Country hold		Swing	+11.8	

==== 1955 ====
1955 Australian federal election: Maranoa
Party	Candidate	Votes	%	±%
Country	Wilfred Brimblecombe	15,363	44.6	+2.3
Independent	Charles Russell	15,066	43.7	+26.3
Independent	Paul Bauers	4,035	11.7	+11.7
Total formal votes		34,464	98.0	
Informal votes		710	2.0	
Turnout		35,174	92.3	
Two-party-preferred result
Country	Wilfred Brimblecombe	17,596	51.1	−3.0
Independent	Charles Russell	16,868	48.9	+48.9
Country hold		Swing	−3.0	

==== 1954 ====
1954 Australian federal election: Maranoa
Party	Candidate	Votes	%	±%
Country	Wilfred Brimblecombe	14,323	42.3	+9.9
Labor	Eric Taylor	13,649	40.3	+2.6
Independent	Charles Russell	5,906	17.4	−12.5
Total formal votes		33,878	99.3	
Informal votes		230	0.7	
Turnout		34,108	94.3	
Two-party-preferred result
Country	Wilfred Brimblecombe	18,364	54.2	−2.6
Labor	Eric Taylor	15,514	45.8	+2.6
Country hold		Swing	−2.6	

==== 1951 ====
1951 Australian federal election: Maranoa
Party	Candidate	Votes	%	±%
Labor	Alfred Dohring	11,989	37.7	−2.7
Country	Wilfred Brimblecombe	10,316	32.4	−27.2
Independent	Charles Russell	9,502	29.9	+29.9
Total formal votes		31,807	98.5	
Informal votes		475	1.5	
Turnout		32,282	93.4	
Two-party-preferred result
Country	Wilfred Brimblecombe	18,071	56.8	−2.8
Labor	Alfred Dohring	13,736	43.2	+2.8
Country hold		Swing	−2.8	

=== Elections in the 1940s ===
==== 1949 ====
1949 Australian federal election: Maranoa
Party	Candidate	Votes	%	±%
Country	Charles Russell	18,652	59.6	+6.3
Labor	Martin Laracy	12,657	40.4	−1.6
Total formal votes		31,309	98.9	
Informal votes		335	1.1	
Turnout		31,644	93.8	
Country hold		Swing	+3.8	

==== 1946 ====
1946 Australian federal election: Maranoa
Party	Candidate	Votes	%	±%
Country	Charles Adermann	29,547	58.0	+7.0
Labor	John Dufficy	18,934	37.2	−11.8
Services	John Walker	2,441	4.8	+4.8
Total formal votes		50,922	98.2	
Informal votes		909	1.8	
Turnout		51,831	89.6	
Two-party-preferred result
Country	Charles Adermann		61.6	+10.6
Labor	John Dufficy		38.4	−10.6
Country hold		Swing	+10.6	

==== 1943 ====
1943 Australian federal election: Maranoa
Party	Candidate	Votes	%	±%
Country	Charles Adermann	26,963	51.0	+6.4
Labor	Frank Baker	25,914	49.0	+1.1
Total formal votes		52,877	98.7	
Informal votes		686	1.3	
Turnout		53,563	92.0	
Country gain from Labor		Swing	+2.6	

==== 1940 ====
1940 Australian federal election: Maranoa
Party	Candidate	Votes	%	±%
Labor	Frank Baker	24,105	47.9	+6.5
Country	Bob McGeoch	22,452	44.6	−3.8
Independent	Henry Madden	3,808	7.6	+7.6
Total formal votes		50,365	98.2	
Informal votes		939	1.8	
Turnout		51,304	90.3	
Two-party-preferred result
Labor	Frank Baker	25,987	51.6	+5.9
Country	Bob McGeoch	24,378	48.4	−5.9
Labor gain from Country		Swing	+5.9	

=== Elections in the 1930s ===
==== 1937 ====
1937 Australian federal election: Maranoa
Party	Candidate	Votes	%	±%
Country	James Hunter	24,846	48.4	−3.4
Labor	Randolph Bedford	21,272	41.4	+0.5
Social Credit	Henry Madden	5,257	10.2	+2.9
Total formal votes		51,375	98.2	
Informal votes		963	1.8	
Turnout		52,338	93.3	
Two-party-preferred result
Country	James Hunter	27,914	54.3	−5.7
Labor	Randolph Bedford	23,461	45.7	+5.7
Country hold		Swing	−5.7	

==== 1934 ====
1934 Australian federal election: Maranoa
Party	Candidate	Votes	%	±%
Country	James Hunter	24,928	51.8	+2.1
Labor	Duncan Watson	19,674	40.9	−3.9
Social Credit	William Argaet	3,493	7.3	+7.3
Total formal votes		48,095	98.1	
Informal votes		935	1.9	
Turnout		49,030	92.8	
Two-party-preferred result
Country	James Hunter		56.5	+1.7
Labor	Duncan Watson		43.5	−1.7
Country hold		Swing	+1.7	

==== 1931 ====
1931 Australian federal election: Maranoa
Party	Candidate	Votes	%	±%
Country	James Hunter	16,278	51.8	−3.1
Labor	Myles Ferricks	15,119	48.2	+3.1
Total formal votes		31,397	98.2	
Informal votes		564	1.8	
Turnout		31,961	92.2	
Country hold		Swing	−3.1	

=== Elections in the 1920s ===
==== 1929 ====
1929 Australian federal election: Maranoa
Party	Candidate	Votes	%	±%
Country	James Hunter	17,215	54.9	−3.4
Labor	Robert Munro	14,123	45.1	+3.4
Total formal votes		31,338	97.2	
Informal votes		891	2.8	
Turnout		32,229	92.4	
Country hold		Swing	−3.4	

==== 1928 ====
1928 Australian federal election: Maranoa
Party	Candidate	Votes	%	±%
Country	James Hunter	16,837	58.3	+5.7
Labor	Jack Reid	12,024	41.7	−5.7
Total formal votes		28,861	95.7	
Informal votes		1,289	4.3	
Turnout		30,150	90.6	
Country hold		Swing	+5.7	

==== 1925 ====
1925 Australian federal election: Maranoa
Party	Candidate	Votes	%	±%
Country	James Hunter	14,463	52.6	−1.8
Labor	Samuel Brassington	13,024	47.4	+1.8
Total formal votes		27,487	97.1	
Informal votes		824	2.9	
Turnout		28,311	83.8	
Country hold		Swing	−1.8	

==== 1922 ====
1922 Australian federal election: Maranoa
Party	Candidate	Votes	%	±%
Country	James Hunter	13,207	54.4	+11.9
Labor	John Durkin	11,086	45.6	−5.5
Total formal votes		24,293	96.2	
Informal votes		951	3.8	
Turnout		25,244	76.7	
Country hold		Swing	+6.1	

==== 1921 by-election ====
1921 Maranoa by-election
Party	Candidate	Votes	%	±%
Country	James Hunter	11,751	53.2	+5.9
Labor	William Dunstan	10,329	46.8	−5.9
Total formal votes		22,080	99.6	
Informal votes		89	0.4	
Turnout		22,169	73.8	
Country gain from Labor		Swing	+5.9	

=== Elections in the 1910s ===
==== 1919 ====
1919 Australian federal election: Maranoa
Party	Candidate	Votes	%	±%
Labor	Jim Page	12,127	52.7	−2.1
Primary Producers	James Hunter	10,885	47.3	+47.3
Total formal votes		23,012	97.6	
Informal votes		563	2.4	
Turnout		23,575	77.1	
Labor hold		Swing	−2.1	

==== 1917 ====
1917 Australian federal election: Maranoa
Party	Candidate	Votes	%	±%
Labor	Jim Page	13,850	54.8	−45.2
Nationalist	Herbert Yeates	11,409	45.2	+45.2
Total formal votes		25,259	97.1	
Informal votes		753	2.9	
Turnout		26,012	84.4	
Labor hold		Swing	−45.2	

==== 1914 ====
1914 Australian federal election: Maranoa
Party	Candidate	Votes	%	±%
Labor	Jim Page	unopposed		
Labor hold		Swing		

==== 1913 ====
1913 Australian federal election: Maranoa
Party	Candidate	Votes	%	±%
Labor	Jim Page	13,969	65.0	−4.8
Liberal	Herbert Yeates	7,516	35.0	+4.8
Total formal votes		21,485	96.6	
Informal votes		752	3.4	
Turnout		22,237	68.6	
Labor hold		Swing	−4.8	

==== 1910 ====
1910 Australian federal election: Maranoa
Party	Candidate	Votes	%	±%
Labour	Jim Page	10,862	71.0	+2.2
Liberal	Jasper Harvey	4,436	29.0	−2.2
Total formal votes		15,298	96.8	
Informal votes		510	3.2	
Turnout		15,808	53.6	
Labour hold		Swing	+2.2	

=== Elections in the 1900s ===
==== 1906 ====
1906 Australian federal election: Maranoa
Party	Candidate	Votes	%	±%
Labour	Jim Page	6,599	68.8	−6.2
Anti-Socialist	Joseph Little	2,989	31.2	+6.2
Total formal votes		9,588	94.2	
Informal votes		593	5.8	
Turnout		10,181	41.2	
Labour hold		Swing	−6.2	

==== 1903 ====
1903 Australian federal election: Maranoa
Party	Candidate	Votes	%	±%
Labour	Jim Page	7,173	75.0	+21.7
Protectionist	Daniel Leahy	2,390	25.0	−21.7
Total formal votes		9,563	97.2	
Informal votes		280	2.8	
Turnout		9,843	58.4	
Labour hold		Swing	+21.7	

==== 1901 ====
1901 Australian federal election: Maranoa
Party	Candidate	Votes	%	±%
Labour	Jim Page	2,998	53.3	+53.3
Free Trade	George Bunning	2,629	46.7	+46.7
Total formal votes		5,627	98.9	
Informal votes		62	1.1	
Turnout		5,689	65.2	
Labour win		(new seat)		
