= 1861 in the United States =

- Decades: 1840s; 1850s; 1860s; 1870s; 1880s
- See also: History of the United States (1849–1865); Timeline of United States history (1860–1899); List of years in the United States

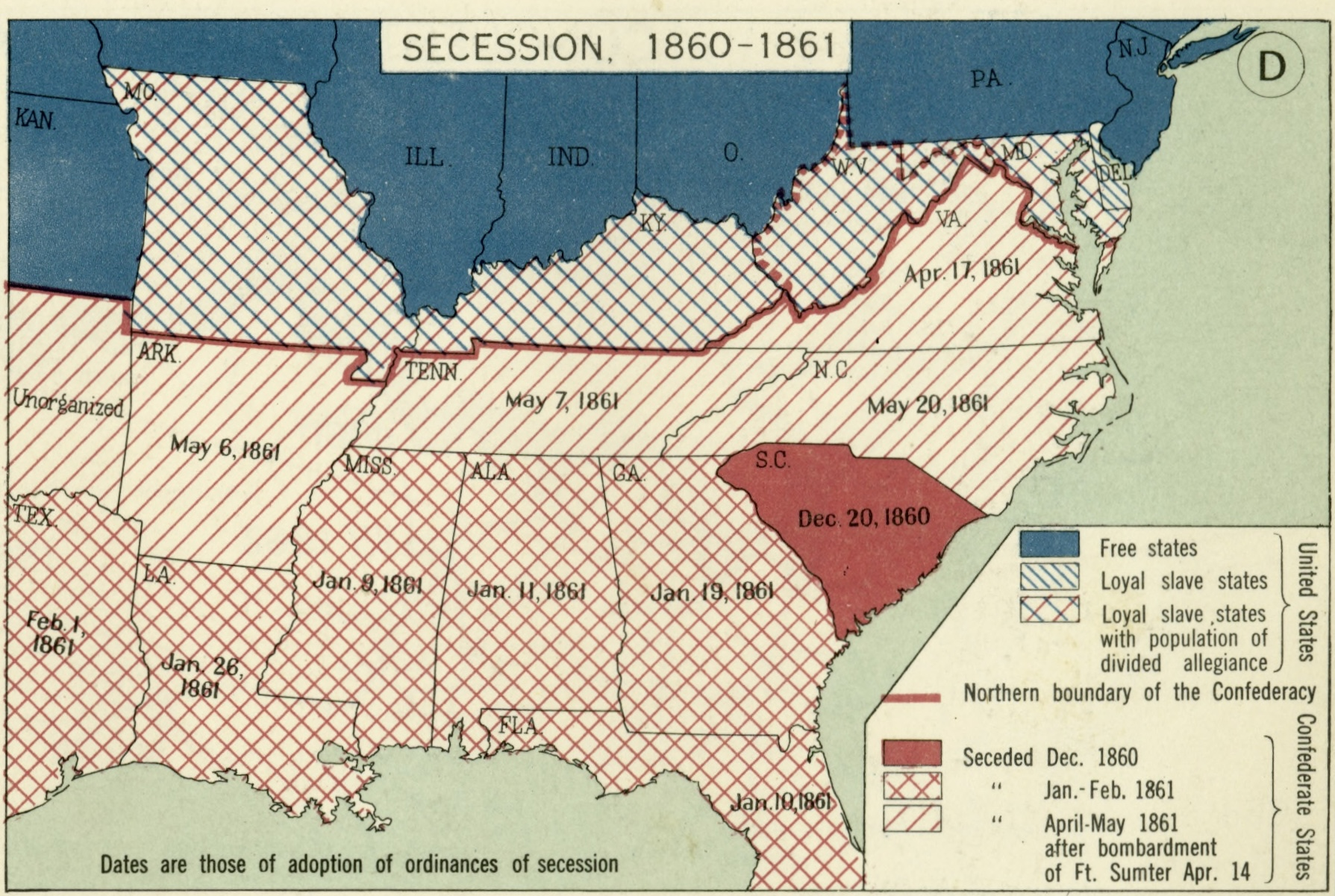
Map of the secession crisis of 1860 to 1861

Events from the year 1861 in the United States. This year marked the beginning of the American Civil War.

== Incumbents ==
=== Federal government ===
- President:

James Buchanan (D-Pennsylvania) (until March 4)
Abraham Lincoln (R-Illinois) (starting March 4)

- Vice President:

John C. Breckinridge (D-Kentucky) (until March 4)
Hannibal Hamlin (R-Maine) (starting March 4)

- Chief Justice: Roger B. Taney (Maryland)
- Speaker of the House of Representatives:

William Pennington (R-New Jersey) (until March 4)
Galusha A. Grow (R-Pennsylvania) (starting July 4)

- Congress: 36th (until March 4), 37th (starting March 4)

==== State governments ====
Governors and lieutenant governors

=== Governors ===
- Governor of Alabama: Andrew B. Moore (Democratic) (until December 2), John Gill Shorter (Democratic) (starting December 2)
- Governor of Arkansas: Henry Massey Rector (Democratic)
- Governor of California: John G. Downey (Democratic)
- Governor of Connecticut: William A. Buckingham (Republican)
- Governor of Delaware: William Burton (Democratic)
- Governor of Florida: Madison S. Perry (Democratic) (until October 7), John Milton (Democratic) (starting October 7)
- Governor of Georgia: Joseph E. Brown (Democratic)
- Governor of Illinois: John Wood (Republican) (until January 14), Richard Yates (Republican) (starting January 14)
- Governor of Indiana:
  - until January 14: Abram A. Hammond (Democratic)
  - January 14–16: Henry S. Lane (Republican)
  - starting January 16: Oliver P. Morton (Republican)
- Governor of Iowa: Samuel J. Kirkwood (Republican)
- Governor of Kansas: Samuel Medary (Democratic) (until February 9), Charles L. Robinson (Republican) (starting February 9)
- Governor of Kentucky: Beriah Magoffin (Democratic)
- Governor of Louisiana: Thomas Overton Moore (Democratic)
- Governor of Maine: Lot M. Morrill (Democratic) (until January 2), Israel Washburn Jr. (Republican) (starting January 2)
- Governor of Maryland: Thomas H. Hicks (Know Nothing)/(Republican)
- Governor of Massachusetts: Nathaniel Prentice Banks (Republican) (until January 3), John Albion Andrew (Republican) (starting January 3)
- Governor of Michigan: Moses Wisner (Republican) (until January 2), Austin Blair (Republican) (starting January 2)
- Governor of Minnesota: Alexander Ramsey (Republican)
- Governor of Mississippi: John J. Pettus (Democratic)
- Governor of Missouri:
  - until January 3: Robert Marcellus Stewart (Democratic)
  - January 3 – July 31: Claiborne Fox Jackson (Democratic)
  - starting July 31: Hamilton Rowan Gamble (Republican)
- Governor of New Hampshire: Ichabod Goodwin (Republican) (until June 6), Nathaniel S. Berry (Republican) (starting June 6)
- Governor of New Jersey: Charles Smith Olden (Republican)
- Governor of New York: Edwin D. Morgan (Republican)
- Governor of North Carolina: John Willis Ellis (Democratic) (until July 7), Henry Toole Clark (Democratic) (starting July 7)
- Governor of Ohio: William Dennison Jr. (Republican)
- Governor of Oregon: John Whiteaker (Democratic)
- Governor of Pennsylvania: William F. Packer (Democratic) (until January 15), Andrew Gregg Curtin (Republican) (starting January 15)
- Governor of Rhode Island: William Sprague IV (Republican)
- Governor of South Carolina: Francis Wilkinson Pickens (Democratic)
- Governor of Tennessee: Isham G. Harris (Democratic)
- Governor of Texas:
  - until March 18: Sam Houston (Independent)
  - March 18 – November 7: Edward Clark (Democratic)
  - starting November 7: Francis R. Lubbock (Democratic)
- Governor of Vermont: Erastus Fairbanks (Republican) (until October 11), Frederick Holbrook (Republican) (starting October 11)
- Governor of Virginia: John Letcher (Democratic)
- Governor of Wisconsin: Alexander W. Randall (Republican)

=== Lieutenant governors ===
- Lieutenant Governor of California: Isaac N. Quinn (Democratic) (until January 7), Pablo de la Guerra (Democratic) (starting January 7)
- Lieutenant Governor of Connecticut: Julius Catlin (Republican) (until month and day unknown), Benjamin Douglas (Republican) (starting month and day unknown)
- Lieutenant Governor of Illinois: Francis Hoffmann (Republican)
- Lieutenant Governor of Indiana:
  - until January 14: vacant
  - January 14–16: Oliver P. Morton (Republican)
  - starting January 16: John R. Cravens (Republican)
- Lieutenant Governor of Iowa: Nicholas J. Rusch (Republican)
- Lieutenant Governor of Kansas: Joseph Pomeroy Root (Republican)
- Lieutenant Governor of Kentucky: vacant
- Lieutenant Governor of Louisiana: Henry M. Hyams (Democratic)
- Lieutenant Governor of Massachusetts:
  - until January 3: Eliphalet Trask (political party unknown)
  - January 3 – month and day unknown: John Z. Goodrich (political party unknown)
  - starting month and day unknown: vacant
- Lieutenant Governor of Michigan:
  - until month and day unknown: Edmund B. Fairfield (Republican)
  - month and day unknown: James M. Birney (Republican)
  - month and day unknown: Joseph R. Williams (Republican)
  - starting month and day unknown: Henry T. Backus (Republican)
- Lieutenant Governor of Minnesota: Ignatius L. Donnelly (Republican)
- Lieutenant Governor of Missouri:
  - until January 3: Hancock Lee Jackson (Democratic)
  - January 3 – July 31: Thomas Caute Reynolds (Democratic)
  - starting July 31: William Preble Hall (Republican)
- Lieutenant Governor of New York: Robert Campbell (Republican)
- Lieutenant Governor of Ohio: Robert C. Kirk (Republican)
- Lieutenant Governor of Rhode Island: J. Russell Bullock (political party unknown) (until month and day unknown), Samuel G. Arnold (political party unknown) (starting month and day unknown)
- Lieutenant Governor of South Carolina: W. W. Harllee (Democratic)
- Lieutenant Governor of Texas: Edward Clark (Democratic) (until month and day unknown), John McClannahan Crockett (Democratic) (starting month and day unknown)
- Lieutenant Governor of Vermont: Levi Underwood (Republican)
- Lieutenant Governor of Virginia: Robert Latane Montague (no political party)
- Lieutenant Governor of Wisconsin: Butler G. Noble (Republican)

== Events ==
=== January–March ===
Confederate States of America

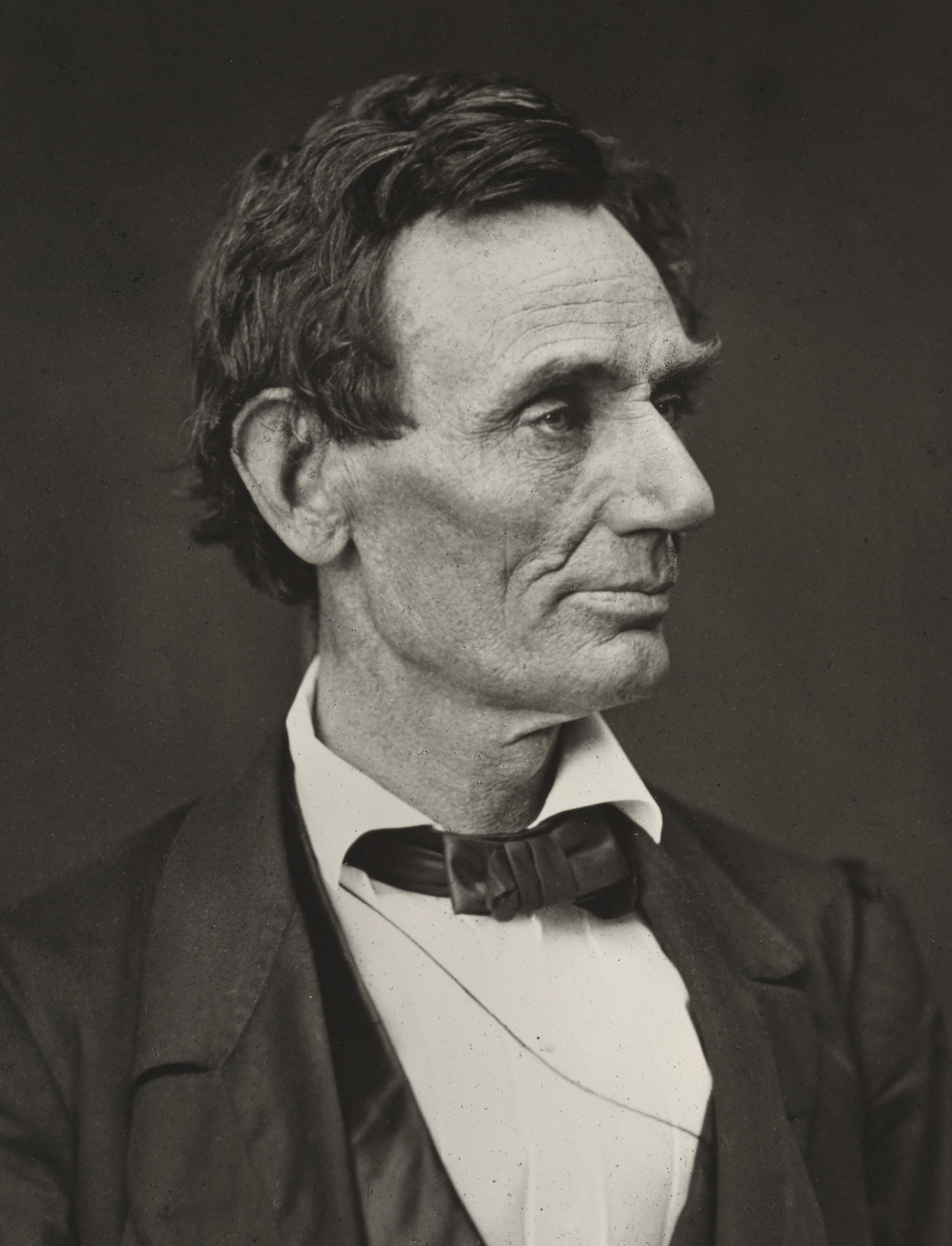
March 4: Abraham Lincoln becomes the 16th U.S. president

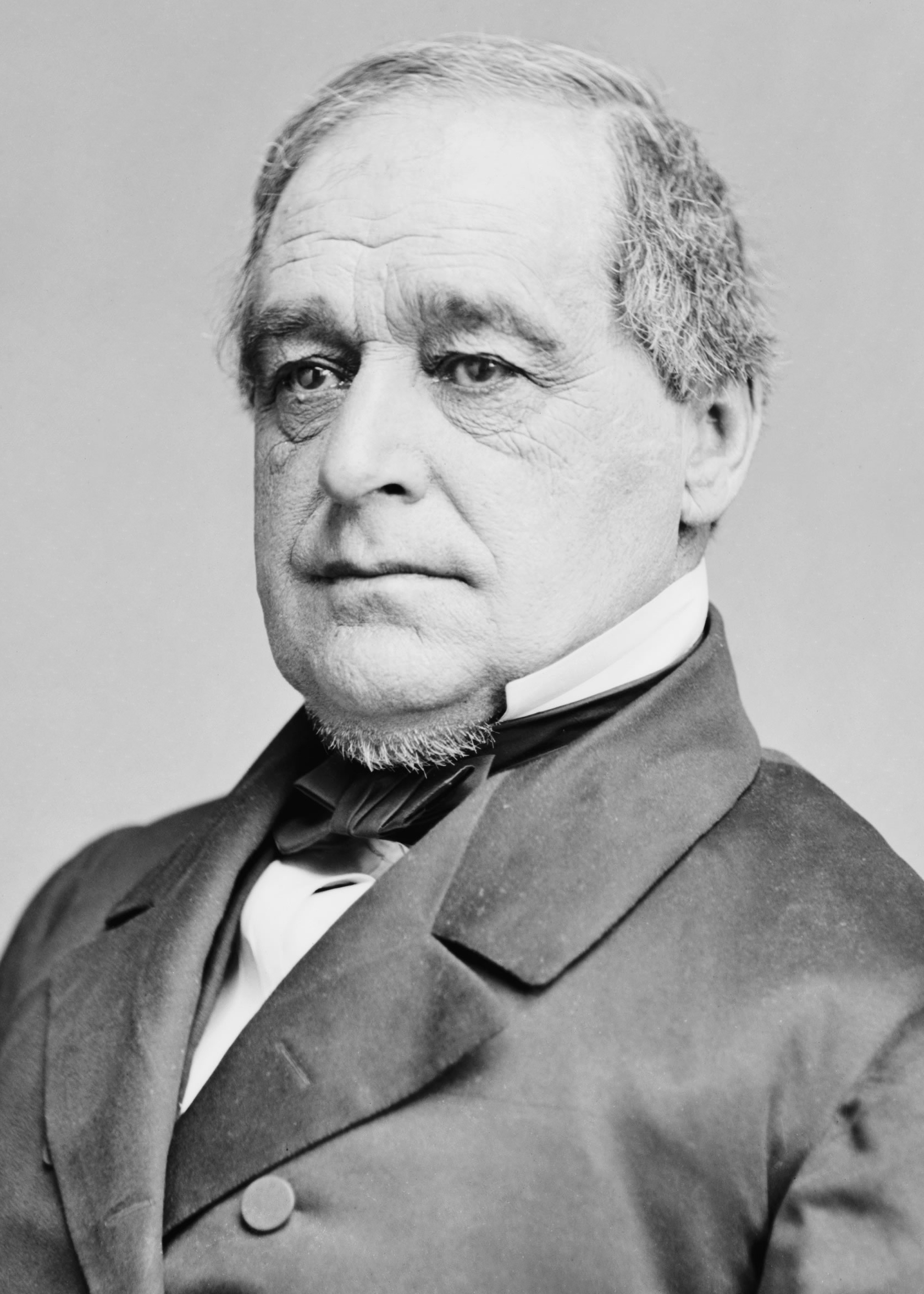
Hannibal Hamlin becomes the 15th U.S. vice president

- January 3 – American Civil War: Delaware votes not to secede from the Union.
- January 9 – Mississippi becomes the second state to secede from the Union, preceding the American Civil War.
- January 10 – American Civil War: Florida secedes from the Union.
- January 11 – American Civil War: Alabama secedes from the Union.
- January 12 – Major Robert Anderson sends dispatches to Washington.
- January 12 – American Civil War: Florida state troops demand surrender of Fort Pickens.
- January 18 – American Civil War: Georgia secedes from the Union.
- January 21 – American Civil War: Jefferson Davis resigns from the United States Senate. Ordinance of Secession is ratified.
- January 26 – American Civil War: Louisiana secedes from the Union.
- January 29 – Kansas is admitted as the 34th U.S. state (see History of Kansas).
- February 1 – American Civil War: Texas secedes from the Union.
- February 4 – American Civil War: Delegates from six seceded states meet at the Montgomery Convention in Montgomery, Alabama.
- February 8 – American Civil War: The Confederate States of America adopts the Provisional Constitution of the Confederate States.
- February 9 – American Civil War: Jefferson Davis is elected the provisional president of the Confederate States of America by the Weed Convention at Montgomery, Alabama.
- February 11 – American Civil War: The U.S. House unanimously passes a resolution guaranteeing non-interference with slavery in any state.
- February 18 – American Civil War: In Montgomery, Alabama, Jefferson Davis is inaugurated as the provisional president of the Confederate States of America.
- February 23 – President-elect Abraham Lincoln arrives secretly in Washington, D.C., after an assassination attempt in Baltimore.
- February 28 – Colorado Territory is organized.
- March 2 – Nevada Territory and Dakota Territory are organized.
- March 4
  - Abraham Lincoln is sworn in as the 16th president of the United States, and Hannibal Hamlin is sworn in as the 15th vice president.
  - American Civil War: The Stars and Bars is adopted as the flag of the Confederate States of America.
- March 11 – American Civil War: The Constitution of the Confederate States is adopted.

=== April–June ===
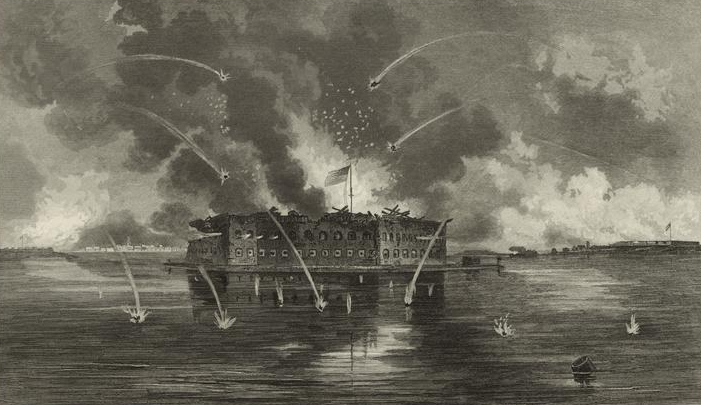
April 12–14: Battle of Fort Sumter, the beginning of the American Civil War

- April 12 – Battle of Fort Sumter: The American Civil War begins at Fort Sumter, South Carolina.
- April 14 – Battle of Fort Sumter: Fort Sumter surrenders to Confederate forces.
- April 17 – The state of Virginia secedes from the Union.
- April 20 – American Civil War: Robert E. Lee resigns his commission in the United States Army in order to command the forces of the state of Virginia.
- April 25 – American Civil War: The Union Army arrives in Washington, D.C.
- April 27 – American Civil War:
  - President Abraham Lincoln suspends the writ of habeas corpus in Maryland.
- May 6 – American Civil War: Arkansas secedes from the Union.
- May 7 – American Civil War: Tennessee secedes from the Union.
- May 8 – American Civil War: Richmond, Virginia, is named the capital of the Confederate States of America.
- May 10 – American Civil War – Camp Jackson Affair: Union military forces clash with civilians on the streets of St. Louis, Missouri, resulting in the deaths of at least 28 people and injuries to another 100.
- May 13 – American Civil War: Queen Victoria issues a "proclamation of neutrality" which recognizes the breakaway states as having belligerent rights.
- May 20
  - American Civil War: Kentucky proclaims its neutrality which lasts until September 3, when Confederate forces enter the state.
  - American Civil War: North Carolina secedes from the Union.

=== July–September ===
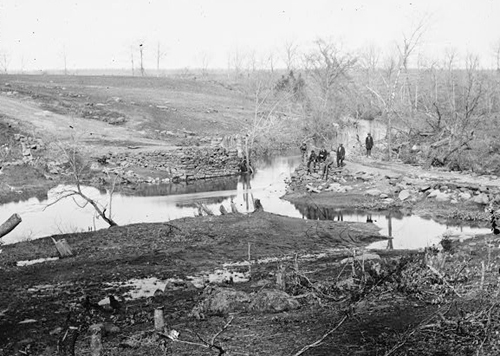
July 21: Confederate victory at the First Battle of Bull Run

- July 13 – American Civil War: The Battle of Corrick's Ford takes place in western Virginia.
- July 21 – American Civil War – First Battle of Bull Run aka First Manassas: at Manassas Junction, Virginia, the first major battle of the war ends in a Confederate victory.
- July 22 – American Civil War: After Union forces led by Nathaniel Lyon capture the Missouri state capital of Jefferson City, the Missouri Constitutional Convention reconvenes and removes pro-secessionist Governor Claiborne Fox Jackson from office, replacing him with a pro-Union governor.
- July 25 – American Civil War: The Crittenden–Johnson Resolution is passed by the U.S. Congress, stating that the war is being fought to preserve the Union and not to end slavery.
- July 26 – American Civil War: George B. McClellan assumes command of the Army of the Potomac following a disastrous Union defeat at the First Battle of Bull Run.
- August 5
  - American Civil War: In order to help pay for the war effort, the United States government issues the first income tax as part of the Revenue Act of 1861 (3% of all incomes over US$800; rescinded in 1872).
  - The U.S. Army abolishes flogging.
  - John Gill Shorter is elected the 17th governor of Alabama defeating Thomas H. Watts.
- August 10 – American Civil War: The first major battle west of the Mississippi River, the Battle of Wilson's Creek, is fought, with a Confederate victory.
- September 3 – American Civil War: Confederate General Leonidas Polk invades neutral Kentucky, prompting the state legislature to ask for Union assistance.
- September 6 – American Civil War: Forces under Union General Ulysses S. Grant bloodlessly capture Paducah, Kentucky, which gives the Union control the mouth of the Tennessee River.

=== October–December ===
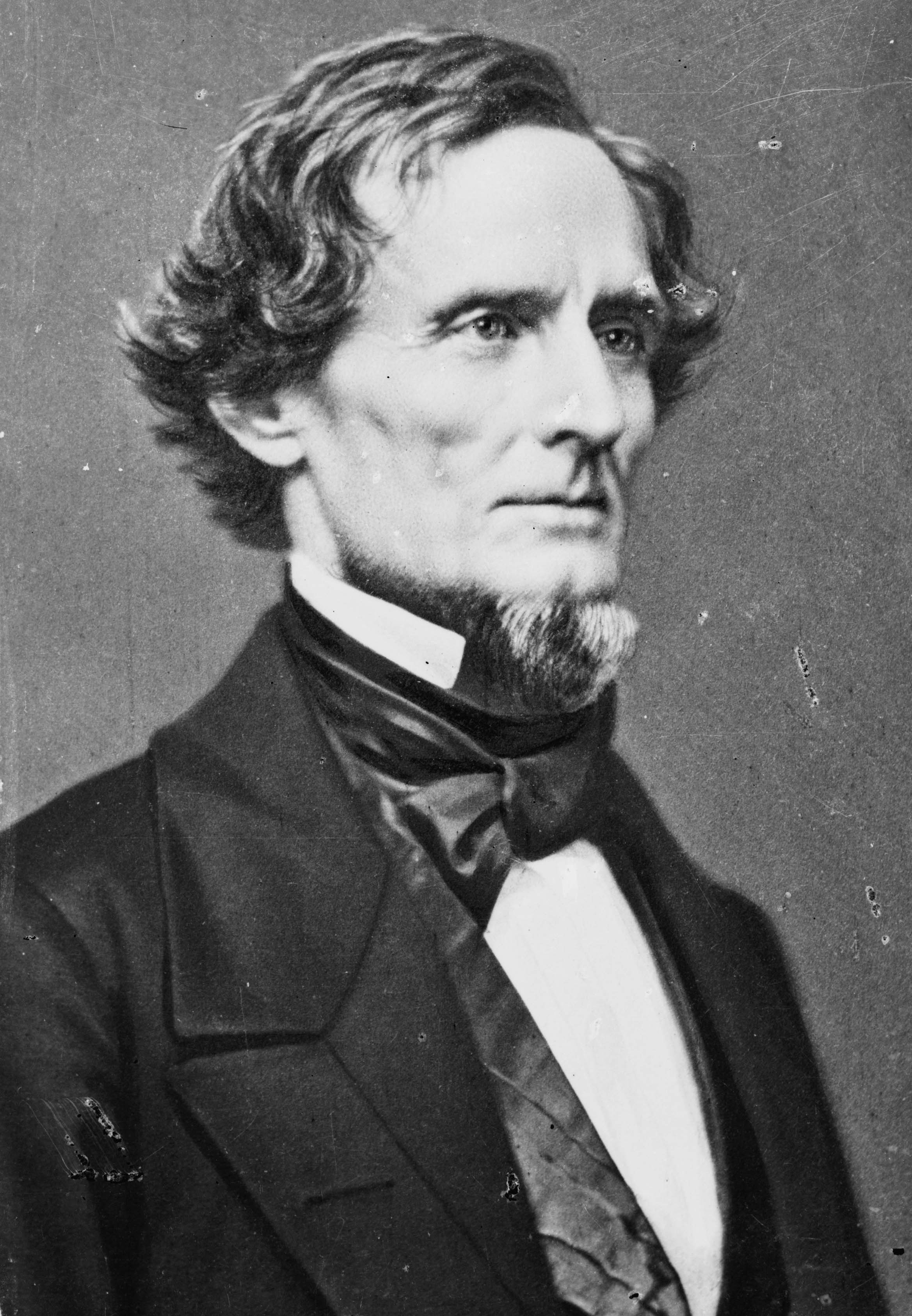
November 6: Jefferson Davis elected President of the CSA

- October 9 – American Civil War – Battle of Santa Rosa Island: Confederate forces are defeated in their effort to take the island.
- October 21 – American Civil War – Battle of Ball's Bluff: Union forces under Colonel Edward Baker are defeated by Confederate troops in the second major battle of the war. Baker, a close friend of Abraham Lincoln, is killed in the fighting.
- October 28 – A small pro-secessionist section of the Missouri legislature takes up a bill for Missouri's secession from the Union.
- October 30 – The bill is passed for Missouri's secession from the Union.
- October 31
  - Missouri's secession from the Union bill is signed by Governor Claiborne Fox Jackson, but by this date Governor Jackson only controls parts of South-Western Missouri. Union forces led by general John C. Frémont have consolidated control over the vast majority of Missouri.
  - American Civil War: Citing failing health, Union General Winfield Scott resigns as Commander of the United States Army.
- November 1 – American Civil War: U.S. President Abraham Lincoln appoints George B. McClellan as commander of the Union Army, replacing the aged General Winfield Scott.
- November 2 – American Civil War: Western Department Union General John C. Frémont is relieved of command and replaced by David Hunter.
- November 6 – American Civil War: Jefferson Davis is elected president of the Confederate States of America.
- November 7 – American Civil War – Battle of Belmont: In Mississippi County, Union forces led by General Ulysses S. Grant overrun a Confederate camp but are forced to retreat when Confederate reinforcements arrive.
- November 8 – American Civil War – Trent Affair: The USS San Jacinto stops the United Kingdom mail ship Trent and arrests two Confederate envoys, James Mason and John Slidell, sparking a diplomatic crisis between the U.K. and U.S.
- November 21 – American Civil War: Confederate President Jefferson Davis appoints Judah Benjamin Secretary of War.
- November 28 – American Civil War: Acting on the ordinance passed by the Jackson government, the Confederate Congress admits Missouri as the 12th Confederate state.
- December 2 – John Gill Shorter is sworn in as the 17th governor of Alabama replacing Andrew B. Moore.
- December 10 – American Civil War: Kentucky is accepted into the Confederate States of America.

=== Ongoing ===
- Secession crisis (1860–1861)
- American Civil War (1861–1865)

=== Undated ===
- Alonzo E. Deitz founds the A. E. Deitz lock company in Brooklyn, New York.

== Births ==
- January 7 – Louise Imogen Guiney, poet (died 1920)
- January 12 – James Mark Baldwin, philosopher and psychologist (died 1934)
- January 26 – Frank O. Lowden, 25th Governor of Illinois from 1917 and U.S. Representative from Illinois from 1906 to 1911 (died 1943)
- January 29 – William M. Butler, U.S. Senator from Massachusetts from 1892 to 1895 (died 1937)
- January (date unknown) – Elmer Halsey, Member of the Washington House of Representatives from 1909 to 1919 and from 1923 to 1927 (died 1943)
- February 15 – Martin Burns, wrestler and coach (died 1937)
- February 26 – Godfrey Lowell Cabot, industrialist and philanthropist (died 1962)
- March 1 – Henry Harland, novelist and editor (died 1905)
- March 15 – Joseph M. Devine, 6th Governor of North Dakota from 1898 to 1899 (died 1938)
- March 20 – Wilds P. Richardson, U.S. Army officer (died 1929)
- April 17 – Willard Saulsbury Jr., U.S. Senator from Delaware from 1913 to 1919 (died 1927)
- April 19 – John Grier Hibben, minister, philosopher and educator (died 1933)
- April 20 – James D. Phelan, U.S. Senator from California from 1915 to 1921 (died 1930)
- April 23 – John Peltz, baseball player (died 1906)
- April 27 – William Lorimer, U.S. Senator from Illinois from 1909 to 1912 (died 1934)
- May 16 – Herman Webster Mudgett, alias H. H. Holmes, serial killer (died 1896)
- May 20 – Henry Gantt, project engineer (died 1919)
- May 25 – Julia Boynton Green, poet (died 1947)
- June 2 – Helen Herron Taft, First Lady of the U.S. as wife of the 27th president, William Howard Taft (died 1943)
- June 6 – Joseph M. Terrell, U.S. Senator from Georgia from 1910 to 1911 (died 1912)
- June 29 – William James Mayo, physician, medic, co-founder of Mayo Clinic (died 1939)
- July 7 – Nettie Stevens, geneticist (died 1912)
- July 9 – James M. Beck, politician (died 1936)
- July 11 – George W. Norris, U.S. Senator from Nebraska from 1913 till 1943 (died 1944)
- July 22
  - Joseph L. Bristow, U.S. Senator from Kansas from 1909 to 1915 (died 1944)
  - James Speyer, banker (died 1941)
- July 26 – James K. Vardaman, politician (died 1930)
- August 3 – Samuel M. Shortridge, U.S. Senator from California from 1921 till 1933 (died 1952)
- August 4 – Jesse W. Reno, inventor, builder of the first working escalator (died 1947)
- August 6 – Edith Roosevelt, née Carow, First Lady of the U.S. (died 1948)
- August 9
  - L. B. Hanna, 11th Governor of North Dakota from 1913 till 1917 (died 1948)
  - Dorothea Klumpke, astronomer (died 1942)
- August 20 – Anna Shelton, businesswoman (died 1939)
- September 5 – Charles Hodgdon, Member of the Washington House of Representatives from 1917 to 1919 (died 1948)
- September 20 – Herbert Putnam, Librarian of Congress (died 1955)
- September 21 – L. Heisler Ball, U.S. Senator from Delaware from 1919 to 1925 (died 1932)
- September 30 – William Wrigley Jr., chewing gum industrialist (died 1932)
- October 4 – Frederic Remington, painter, illustrator, sculptor and writer (died 1909)
- October 19 – William J. Burns, detective and director of Bureau of Investigation (died 1932)
- November 2 – Charles W. Waterman, U.S. Senator from Colorado from 1927 to 1932 (died 1932)
- November 6
  - Thomas Watt Gregory, U.S. Attorney General (died 1933)
  - James Naismith, Canadian-born inventor of basketball (died 1939)
- November 10 – Bessie Alexander Ficklen, doggerel poet and hand puppet specialist (died 1945)
- November 11 – Frank R. Baker, Member of the Washington House of Representatives from 1893 to 1899 (died 1952)
- November 14 – Frederick Jackson Turner, historian (died 1932)
- November 26 – Albert B. Fall, U.S. Senator from New Mexico from 1912 to 1921 and Secretary of the Interior from 1921 to 1923 under President Warren G. Harding (died 1944)
- December 8 – William C. Durant, businessman (died 1947)
- December 15 – Charles Duryea, engineer and manufacturer of motor vehicles (died 1938)
- December 30 – Charles Hanford Henderson, educator and author (died 1941)

== Deaths ==
- April 4 – John McLean, U.S. Postmaster General from 1823 to 1829, Associate Justice of the Supreme Court from 1829 to 1861 (born 1785)
- April 8 – Elisha Otis, industrialist, founder of the Otis Elevator Company (born 1811)
- April 15
  - Joseph S. Donovan, slave trader of Baltimore (born 1800)
  - Isaiah Stillman, U.S. Army major in the Black Hawk War (born 1793)
- May 21 – Benjamin Paul Akers, sculptor (born 1825)
- May 24 – Elmer E. Ellsworth, first Union officer to die in the Civil War (born 1837)
- June 3 – Stephen A. Douglas, Senator from Illinois from 1847 till 1861 and presidential candidate (born 1813)
- June 5 – John Garland, Bvt. Brigadier General in the Union Army (born 1793)
- June 13 – Richard Lawrence, failed assassin of Andrew Jackson (born c. 1800–1801)
- July 7 – John Willis Ellis, 35th Governor of North Carolina from 1859 to 1861 (born 1820)
- July 13 – Robert S. Garnett, Confederate brigadier general (born 1819)
- July 22 – Barnard Elliott Bee Jr., Confederate general (born 1824)
- August 10 – Nathaniel Lyon, Union Army brigadier general, first general to be killed in the Civil War (born 1818)
- August 12 – Eliphalet Remington, gunmaker (born 1793)
- August 17 – Alcée Louis la Branche, politician (born 1806)
- October 5 – Kinsley S. Bingham, U.S. Senator from Michigan from 1859 to 1861 (born 1808)
- October 20 – William Woodbridge, Governor of Michigan from 1840 to 1841 and U.S. Senator from Michigan from 1841 to 1847 (born 1780)
- October 21 – Edward Dickinson Baker, U.S. Senator from Oregon from 1860 to 1861 (born 1811)
- October 26 – Edward "Ned" Kendall, bandleader and instrumentalist (keyed bugle) (born 1808)
- November 28 – Richard M. Young, U.S. Senator from Illinois from 1837 to 1843 (born 1798)

== See also ==
- Timeline of United States history (1860–1899)
