= Frank Baker =

Frank Baker may refer to:

== Sport ==
- Home Run Baker (John Franklin Baker, 1886–1963), American baseball player
- Frank Baker (cricketer) (1887–1961), Irish cricketer
- Frank Baker (American football) (1909–1985), American football player
- Frank Baker (footballer) (1918–1989), English footballer
- Frank Baker (outfielder) (1944–2010), American baseball player
- Frank Baker (shortstop) (born 1946), American baseball player

== Politics ==
- Frank D. Baker (1852–1927), American politician in Michigan
- Frank R. Baker (1861–1952), American politician in the state of Washington
- B. Frank Baker (1864–1939), American businessman and politician in Illinois
- Frank E. Baker (politician) (died 1957), American politician
- Francis Patrick Baker (1873–1959), member of the Australian House of Representatives
- Francis Matthew John Baker (1903–1939), member of the Australian House of Representatives
- Frank Baker (Boston politician) (born 1968), member of the Boston City Council

== Others ==
- Frank Baker (physician) (1841–1918), American physician
- Frank Baker (actor) (1892–1980), Australian western actor of the silent era
- Frank Baker (writer) (1908–1982), English author, actor, musician and television scriptwriter
- Frank Baker (1922–1989), Vancouver alderman and owner of The Attic restaurant
- Frank Baker (diplomat) (born 1961), British ambassador

== See also ==
- Francis Baker (disambiguation)
- Franklin Baker (1872–1946), American flour miller
