= David Russell (barrister) =

Australian barrister

David Russell AM RFD QC
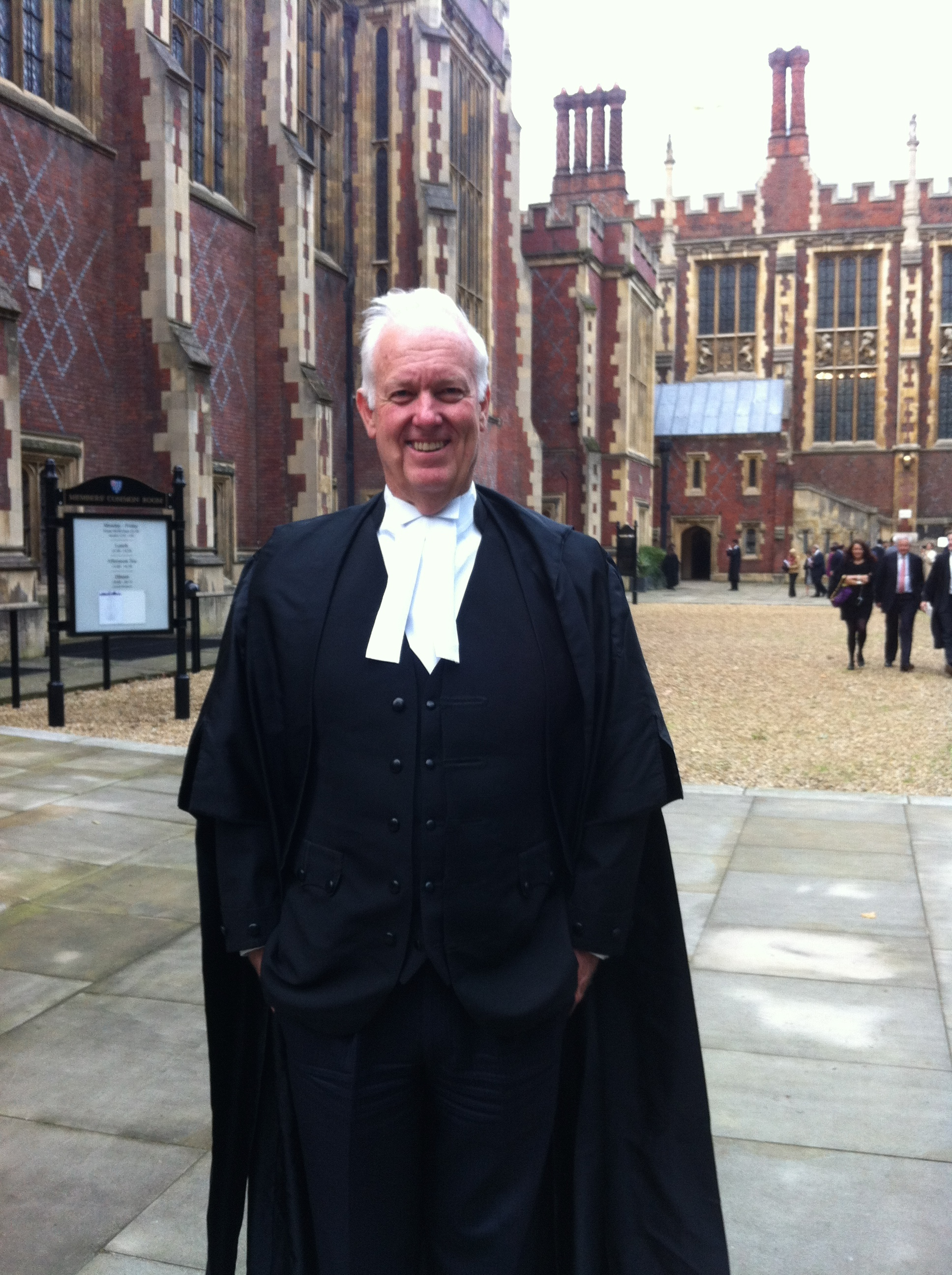

Personal details
- Born: 2 December 1950 (age 75) Dalby, Queensland
- Party: Liberal National Party
- Spouse(s): Deborah Russell† (1975–2011)
- Education: University of Queensland (BA, LL.B., LL.M.)
- Profession: Lawyer
- Website: www.davidrussellqc.com

David Graham Russell, AM, RFD, KC (born 2 December 1950) is an Australian barrister who specialises in international tax law.

== Early life and education ==
David Russell was born in the town of Dalby in Queensland as the second son of Charles Wilfred Russell MP and Hilary Maude Russell (née Newton), subsequently H M Russell OBE. He attended Jimbour State School from 1956 to 1960, after which he attended Anglican Church Grammar School in Brisbane from 1961 to 1967. His university years were spent at the University of Queensland in Brisbane, where he received his Bachelor of Arts in 1971, his Bachelor of Laws in 1974, and finally his Master of Laws in 1983.

== Career ==
=== Professional ===
Russell was admitted as a solicitor in Queensland in 1974, and was called to the Bar in 1977. He is admitted to practise in Australia, England and Wales (where he is a member of Lincoln's Inn), the Courts of the Dubai International Financial Centre, New York (as a legal consultant), New Zealand and Papua New Guinea. He was appointed Queen's Counsel in Australia in 1986.

He has practised in Dubai and London at Outer Temple Chambers, Sydney at Ground Floor Wentworth Chambers and Brisbane at Sir Harry Gibbs Chambers,

He has acted for Commonwealth and State Governments as well as individuals and corporations.

Russell was President of the Taxation Institute of Australia from 1993 to 1995, and of the Asia Oceania Tax Consultants' Association from 1996 to 2000. He is a member of the Law Council of Australia Business Law Section Taxation Committee. He served as a member of the Ministerial Consultative Committee for the Tax Law Improvement Project from 1994 to 1997 and as a member of the Steering Committee for the National Review of Standards for the Tax Profession in 1993 and 1994. From 1991 to 1995, he was a member of the National Tax Liaison Group.

Russell has lectured and written extensively on taxation related topics in Australia and overseas, and served as a member of the Advisory Editorial Board of Australian Tax Practice. He has lectured at the University of Sydney for the Master of Taxation course, the University of Queensland for the Master of Laws course and served as an adjunct professor of the University of Queensland. He was the Australian correspondent for Oxford University Press's academic journal Trusts & Trustees. and is now one of its co-editors.

He was Chairman of STEP Australia, a member of the STEP World Wide Council until 2018. Deputy Chair of STEP WorldWide in 2018 and 2019 and a member of STEP's Professional Standards and Public Policy Committees and the Committee of the STEP Contentious Trusts & Estates Special Interest Group, a co-chair of the United Arab Emirates Chapter of the International Section of the New York State Bar Association, and a member of the Executive Committee of the Section, an Academician of The International Academy of Estate and Trust Law, a member of The Worshipful Company of Tax Advisers, a member of The Commercial Bar Association, an Honorary Member of The Taxation Institute of Hong Kong, a Fellow Member of the Chartered Institute of Taxation (UK) and a Freeman of the City of London.

Russell is listed in the Taxation Category in the Australian Financial Review's Best Lawyers review of the Australian Legal Profession in 2008 and all later years. In 2012, he was made a Member of the Order of Australia for, amongst other things, "service … to taxation law and legal education". In 2014 he was awarded Chartered Tax Adviser of the Year. Since 2017 he has been a member of Legal Week's Private Client Clobal Elite [url=https://privateclientglobalelite.com].

From 2016 to 2018, he chaired the DIFC's Wealth Management Review, and is Executive Editor of the Laws of the DIFC [ref=https://academy.difc.ae/publication/laws-difc-volume-1/].

=== Political ===
Yet there is someone else whose role in conceiving of the new party should also be acknowledged: my colleague David Russell QC, for whom the fusion of the Liberal and National parties in Queensland, to create what we might describe as ‘Liberalism with Queensland characteristics’, has been a life-work.

— George Brandis QC, The Spectator, 31 March 2012

David Russell served continuously on the State Executive of the Liberal National Party of Queensland and its predecessor party, the National Party of Australia — Queensland from 1984 to 2014 apart from six months in 2008–2009. He was President of the National Party in Queensland from 1995 to 1999, Vice-President of the National Party of Australia from 1990 to 1995, and 1999 to 2005, and President of the National Party of Australia from 2005 to 2006. He played a significant part in the merger of the National and Liberal Parties in Queensland in 2008, and was Vice-President of the Liberal Party of Australia from 2009 to 2011.

=== Other ===
Outside the law, Russell maintains his interest in his family's rural business, Russell Pastoral Company, and its flagship property, Jimbour Station in Jimbour, Queensland.

He served as President of the Australia-Japan Society in Queensland from 1997 to 2002, and as inaugural President of the National Federation of Australia Japan Societies from 2001 to 2005. In 2010 he was awarded the Order of the Rising Sun with Gold Rays and Neck Ribbon for services to Australia–Japan relations.

== Personal life ==
Russell married Deborah Ann Campbell on 19 September 1975. Deborah was the daughter of The Hon. Sir Walter Benjamin Campbell AC QC and Georgina Margaret Campbell (née Pearce). They have one son, Andrew Russell.

== Publications ==
- Towards greater fairness in taxation: A Model Taxpayer Charter (2013) ISBN 978-0-9550262-6-3 – with Michael Cadesky & Ian Hayes
