= Hodgdon (surname) =

Hodgdon is a surname. Notable people with the surname include:

- Albion Reed Hodgdon (1909–1976), American botanist
- Bruce Hodgdon, American politician
- Charles Hodgdon (1861–1948), American politician
- Daniel Hodgdon, American academic administrator
- Drew Hodgdon (born 1981), American football player
- John Hodgdon (1800-?), American politician
- Sylvester Phelps Hodgdon (1830–1906), American painter
- Ted Hodgdon (1902–1984), American motorcycle journalist, corporate publicist, motorcycle distribution executive, and antique motorcycle enthusiast
