= Francis Baker =

Francis Baker may refer to:

- Francis Asbury Baker (1820–1865), deacon
- Francis E. Baker (1860–1924), Indiana Supreme Court justice and U.S. federal judge
- Francis Matthew John Baker (1903–1939), member of the Australian House of Representatives
- Francis Patrick Baker (1873–1959), member of the Australian House of Representatives
- Francis Raymond Baker (born 1961), British ambassador
- Francis Baker (cricketer) (1847–1901), English cricketer
- Francis Eustace Baker (1933–2023), governor of Saint Helena, Ascension and Tristan da Cunha

== See also ==
- Frank Baker (disambiguation)
- Frances Baker, British painter (1873–1944)
