= 1921 Maranoa by-election =

- 30 July 1921
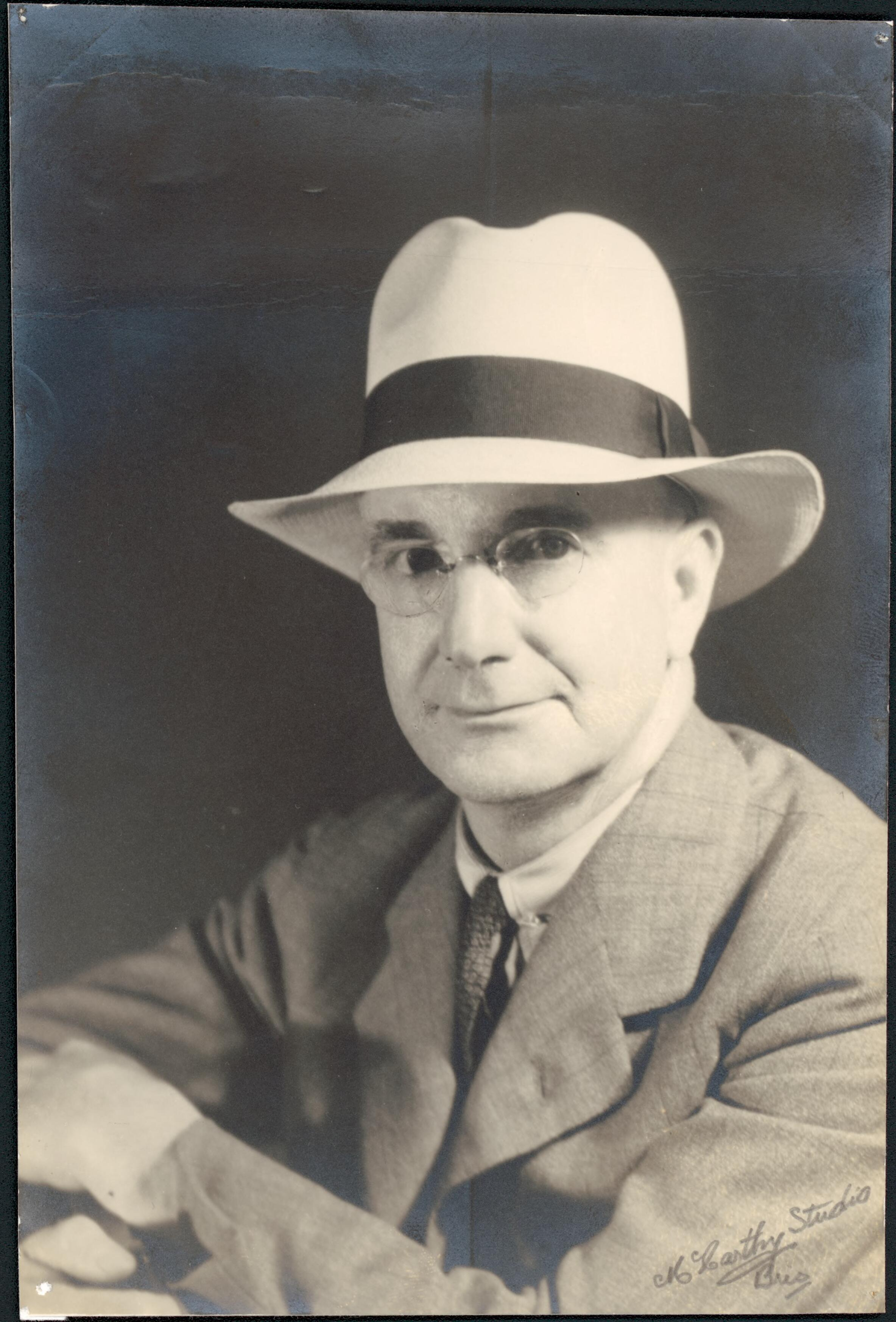
	First party	Second party
		ALP
Candidate	James Hunter	William Dunstan
Party	Country	Labor
Popular vote	11,751	10,329
Percentage	53.2%	46.8%
Swing	▲5.9pp	▼5.9pp
MP before election
Jim Page
Labor
Elected MP
James Hunter
National

A by-election was held for the Australian House of Representatives seat of Maranoa on 30 July 1921. This was triggered by the death of Labor MP Jim Page.

The by-election was won by Country Party candidate James Hunter, giving the Country Party their first seat in Queensland.

Former Queensland Premier and Labor MP T. J. Ryan contracted pneumonia while campaigning for the Labor candidate William Dunstan, leading to Ryan's own death.

== Results ==
Maranoa by-election, 1921
Party	Candidate	Votes	%	±%
Country	James Hunter	11,751	53.2	+5.9
Labor	William Dunstan	10,329	46.8	−5.9
Total formal votes		22,080	99.6	
Informal votes		89	0.4	
Turnout		22,169	73.8	
Country gain from Labor		Swing	+5.9	
