= Tony Molloy (lawyer) =

New Zealand lawyer (born 1944)

Tony Molloy KC
- Born: Anthony Patrick Molloy; 3 March 1944 (age 82); Auckland, New Zealand
- Education: University of Auckland
- Occupations: Barrister and solicitor
- Spouse: Petra Molloy
- Relatives: Nessie Snedden (grandfather)

Anthony Patrick Molloy KC (born 3 March 1944) is a New Zealand lawyer, legal commentator and controversialist.

== Early life and family ==
Molloy was born in the Auckland suburb of Mount Albert on 3 March 1944, the son of Joan Molloy (née Snedden) and Pat Molloy, who was overseas serving as a flying officer in the Royal New Zealand Air Force at the time. His mother is the daughter of cricketer and solicitor Nessie Snedden. Molloy was educated by the Christian Brothers at St Peter's College, Auckland, by the Jesuit Fathers at Holy Name Seminary, Christchurch. He went on to study at the University of Auckland, where he won the Hugh Campbell Scholarship in law, and graduated with a Bachelor of Laws degree in 1968.

== Legal career ==
Molloy was admitted to the Supreme Court (now High Court) as a barrister and solicitor in Auckland in 1967. He commenced practice as a barrister sole in 1969. His practice has been largely in the areas of banking law, domestic and international income and capital taxation, goods and services tax, partnership law, property law, trusts and wills. He has been active in establishing, in the taxation area, the principles of administrative law and judicial review, appearing as counsel in several important cases before the superior courts of New Zealand.

For many years, Molloy was part-time lecturer at the University of Auckland Law School in the law of trusts, wills and succession, and was, for ten years, assessor and moderator in those subjects for all the university law schools in New Zealand. He has published widely, most notably, Molloy on Income Tax (1976) and, with PRH Webb, The Law of Partnership in New Zealand (1998). In 1977, Molloy was awarded the degree of Doctor of Laws (LLD) by the University of Auckland in recognition of his "contributions of special excellence to legal scholarship".

In 1984, Molloy was appointed Queen's Counsel. In 1990, he was awarded the New Zealand 1990 Commemoration Medal.

Molloy has also practised in canon law as counsel appointed by the Catholic Bishop of Auckland in the ecclesiastical courts of the Catholic Church. Molloy has served as co-editor of the legal journal Trusts and Trustees.

== Winebox Inquiry ==
In 1994, Molloy was appointed as taxation adviser to counsel assisting the Winebox Inquiry. His appointment drew protests from some of the parties and in early 1995 the commissioner Sir Ronald Davison terminated Molloy's appointment. Molloy later published a book (Thirty Pieces of Silver (1998)) on some of the issues relevant to that inquiry and, more broadly, the role in New Zealand, of the large legal firm, Russell McVeagh McKenzie Bartleet & Co. He has also published other comment on the Winebox Inquiry.

== Judicial specialisation ==
Molloy has complained about New Zealand's "one judge fits all" approach to law, where the legal profession fails to insist counsel should not argue cases in areas where they have no competence, and parliament fails to insist judges sit on cases only where they have acknowledged expertise. He has been supported by some lawyers and criticised by others, including the attorney-general, Christopher Finlayson, who suggested in 2012 that Molloy surrender his QC warrant.

== Wine grower ==
In 1980, Molloy and his wife Petra established the St Nesbit vineyard and winery at Karaka, 30 kilometres (19 mi) south of Auckland, on a peninsula on the Manukau Harbour. The original plantings were Cabernet Sauvignon, Cabernet Franc and Merlot. From these vines, St Nesbit produced an award-winning red wine. However, the vines were decimated by leaf roll virus in the early 1990s and had to be removed. The vineyard was then replanted with the five Bordeaux varieties (the three mentioned above with Petit Verdot and Malbec) using new clones, low-vigour rootstock and very high plant densities. The first vintage was released from the new vineyard in 2002. It was the first St Nesbit released in 10 years. St Nesbit continues to make only one wine, a vineyard-determined blend.

== Selected works ==
- Molloy on income tax, Butterworths, Wellington, 1976.
- Molloy on tax disputes, investigations and crimes, Fishmore Press, Auckland, 1988.
- Principles of the law of partnership, Butterworths, Wellington, 1996 (with PRH Webb).
- Thirty pieces of silver: a big New Zealand law firm and its concept of professional responsibility, viewed through its words, its works and its documents, Howling at the Moon productions, Auckland, 1998;
