= Wilfred Brimblecombe =

Australian politician (1898–1973)

Wilfred Brimblecombe CBE
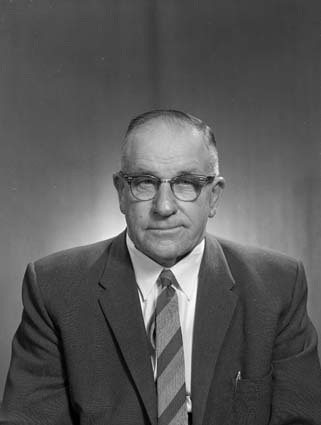

Member of the Australian Parliament for Maranoa
- In office 28 April 1951 – 31 October 1966
- Preceded by: Charles Russell
- Succeeded by: James Corbett

Personal details
- Born: 6 February 1898 Laidley, Queensland
- Died: 14 September 1973 (aged 75) Brisbane
- Party: Australian Country Party
- Spouse: Carrie Edna Storey
- Occupation: Farmer

Wilfred John Brimblecombe, CBE (6 February 1898 – 14 September 1973) was an Australian politician. Born in Laidley, Queensland, he was educated at Ipswich Grammar School and then Queensland Agricultural College. He was a farmer, and served in the military 1915–1919, after which he was a councillor on Wambo Shire Council. In 1951, he was elected to the Australian House of Representatives as the Country Party member for Maranoa, defeating the sitting member, Charles Russell, who had been expelled from the Country Party for supporting the appreciation of the pound. He held the seat until his retirement in 1966. Brimblecombe died in 1973.

Parliament of Australia
Preceded by Charles Russell	Member for Maranoa; 1951 – 1966	Succeeded by James Corbett
