= Ian Cameron (politician) =

Australian retired politician

Member of the Australian Parliament for Maranoa
- In office 18 October 1980 – 19 February 1990
- Preceded by: James Corbett
- Succeeded by: Bruce Scott

Personal details
- Born: 8 March 1938 (age 88) Melbourne, Victoria
- Party: National Party of Australia
- Occupation: Farmer

Ian Milne Dixon Cameron (born 8 March 1938) is an Australian politician. He was a National Country Party member of the Australian House of Representatives, representing the electorate of Maranoa.

Born in Melbourne, Cameron moved to Queensland where he was a farmer and grazier. He was a Shire of Tara councillor from 1971 to 1980 and had been president of the Young Country Party from 1967 to 1968 and a member of the National Party Management Committee from 1976 to 1980.

Cameron was elected to the House of Representatives at the 1980 federal election. He opposed the return of Uluru to its traditional owners in 1985, responding "give 'em Melbourne" in a parliamentary debate on the issue. In 1986, in debate on a women's affirmative action bill, Cameron said he had "never seen such a wank of a bill in his life", argued for eliminating support for unmarried mothers, that married women should be encouraged to stay home and that men should be paid more than women to facilitate that, adding "They could be making the kitchen a lot more attractive than what they're doing these days". His wife Jill Cameron responded "He's entitled to his view and I'm entitled to mine. I'll speak to him when he gets home." In July 1986, he called for the cancellation of a contract to buy defence helicopters from the United States in response to American wheat tariffs.

He was reported to have been a "staunch supporter" of the Joh for Canberra push in 1987, and was one of the rebel National Party MPs who were excluded from the federal party room for a period. However, he strongly resisted rumours that his seat of Maranoa might be a path into parliament for Joh Bjelke-Petersen, declaring after he had been re-endorsed in the face of some opposition that he had "no idea for which seat Joh would be endorsed, but it would not be Maranoa". He was National Party spokesman on housing and construction from April to August 1987 amidst the party divisions, and then became Shadow Minister for Local Government from August 1987 to March 1988.

In March 1988, Cameron was arrested on charges of drink-driving, assaulting and resisting police, after he was reported to have kicked a police officer during a drink-driving stop in Brisbane. He was immediately stood down from the shadow ministry, and was later found guilty, convicted, fined and sentenced to a six-month good behaviour bond, with an appeal unsuccessful. Cameron lost National Party preselection to Bruce Scott for the 1990 election, reportedly due to concerns about his behaviour, and retired at the election.

Cameron unsuccessfully challenged Sir Robert Sparkes for the presidency of the National Party in 1990 and then returned to farming. He was injured in an industrial accident in August 2014, when a machinery collapse saw him trapped in an underground grain silo for seven hours.

Parliament of Australia
Preceded by James Corbett	Member for Maranoa; 1980–1990	Succeeded by Bruce Scott
