= James Corbett (politician) =

Australian politician

James Corbett MBE
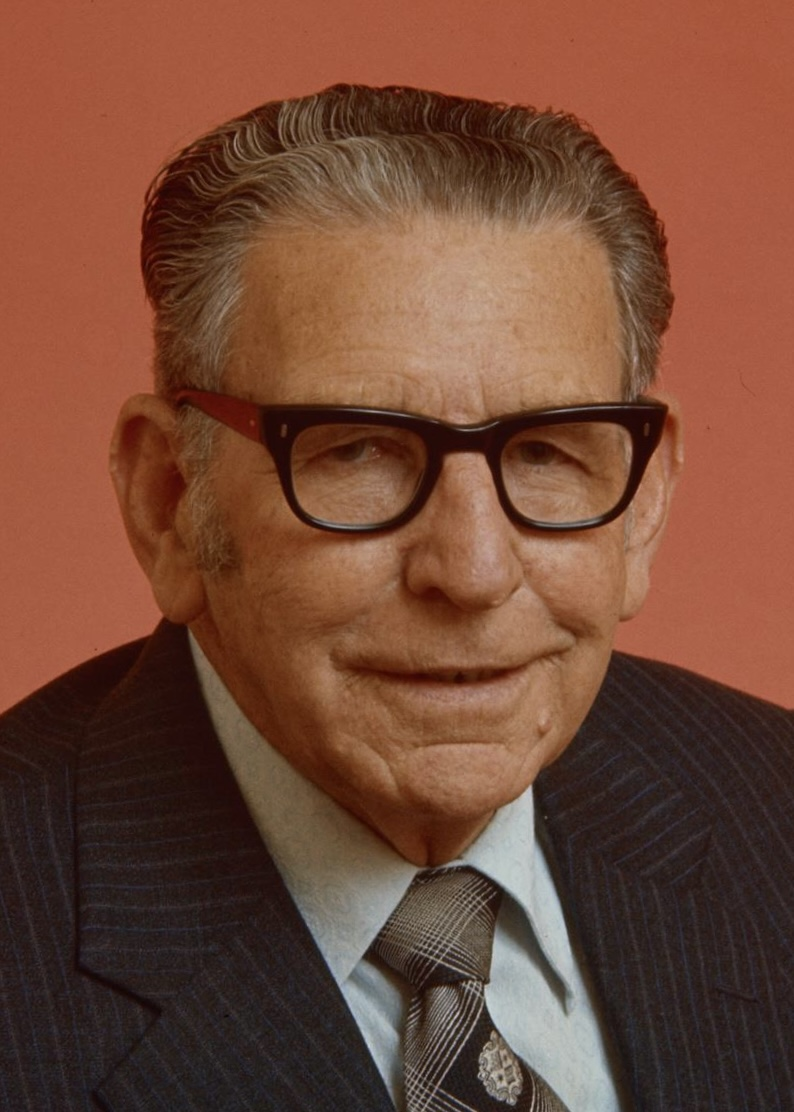
- Corbett in 1974

Member of the Australian Parliament for Maranoa
- In office 26 November 1966 – 19 September 1980
- Preceded by: Wilfred Brimblecombe
- Succeeded by: Ian Cameron

Personal details
- Born: 17 July 1906 Temora, New South Wales, Australia
- Died: 3 March 2005 (aged 98) Miles, Queensland
- Party: National Country Party
- Occupation: Farmer; Grazier

James Corbett, MBE (17 July 1906 – 3 March 2005) was an Australian politician. He was a member of the National Country Party and served in the House of Representatives from 1966 to 1980, representing the Queensland seat of Maranoa. Outside of politics he was a farmer and grazier on the Darling Downs.

== Early life ==
Corbett was born on 17 July 1906 in Temora, New South Wales. He was educated at state and Catholic schools.

Corbett was a grazier and wheat farmer in Queensland before entering politics, with properties on the Darling Downs near Miles and Dulacca. He was active in agricultural circles, serving as vice-president of the Graziers Association of South Eastern Queensland and on the executive of the United Graziers Association of Queensland. He also served as deputy chairman of the Murilla Shire Council from 1958 to 1967.

== Politics ==
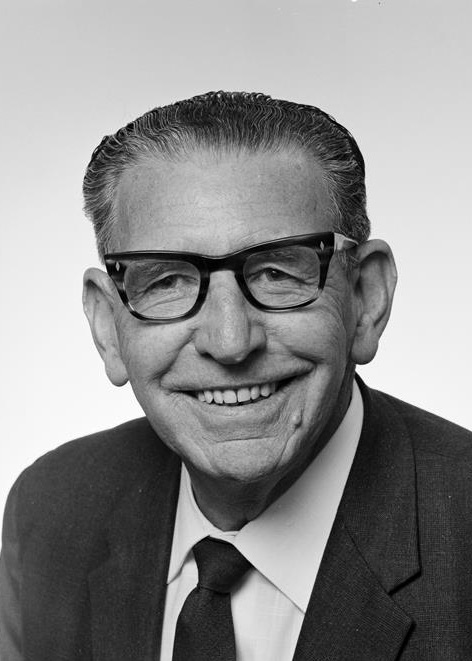
Corbett in 1971

Corbett was a state vice-president of the Country Party. He was an unsuccessful preselection candidate prior to the 1961 federal election, opposing the incumbent Country Party MP Wilfred Brimblecombe in the seat of Maranoa. In September 1965, following Brimblecombe's retirement, he defeated Sir William Gunn in the Maranoa preselection ballot in a contest that attracted national attention due to Gunn's high profile as chairman of the Australian Wool Board. His victory came despite Gunn being the preferred candidate of Country Party leader John McEwen, and was attributed in part to the perception of Gunn as a parachute candidate.

Corbett was elected to the House of Representatives at the 1966 federal election, retaining Maranoa for the Country Party. In parliament he served on a number of committees and was a deputy chairman of committees from 1970 to 1972. He was mostly concerned with rural issues, including water conservation, improvements to rural communications, and distance education where he advocated on behalf of the Isolated Children's Parents' Association.

Corbett served as the National Country Party's whip from 1976 to 1980. According to The Canberra Times, he kept a low profile and after announcing his retirement in 1980 remarked to a reporter that it was the first time he had spoken to a member of the Canberra Press Gallery. He retired from parliament at the 1980 federal election.

== Personal life ==
Corbett was appointed a Member of the Order of the British Empire (MBE) in the 1986 New Year Honours "in recognition of service to the community". He died on 3 March 2005, aged 98.

Parliament of Australia
Preceded by Wilfred Brimblecombe	Member for Maranoa; 1966–1980	Succeeded by Ian Cameron
