= Charles Hanford Henderson =

American educator and author

Charles Hanford Henderson (December 30, 1861 – January 2, 1941) was an American educator and author.

== Biography ==
Born in Philadelphia, he graduated from the University of Pennsylvania in 1882; was lecturer at the Franklin Institute 1883–86; Professor of Physics and Chemistry in the Philadelphia Manual Training School 1889–91, principal 1893–95; Ph.D. at Zurich in 1892; lecturer on education at Harvard 1897–98; and director Pratt Institute, Brooklyn, 1898–99.

Henderson founded Camp Marienfeld a Summer Camp for Boys and was its headmaster for 17 years, and was headmaster of the Marienfeld Open-Air School at Samarcand, North Carolina, 1914–16. Marienfeld; a pioneer among camps was established by Dr. Henderson in the summer of 1896 in Milford, Pennsylvania, and was moved to Chesham, New Hampshire in 1899 and operated into the 1950s. It was a study camp for boys and stressed the educational program of the progressive camp.

Henderson was an early proponent of manual training and the Arts and Crafts movement in industry. He advocated redesigning the school to suit the nature and needs of the child. Marietta Johnson, the founder of the Marietta Johnson School of Organic Education in Fairhope, Alabama credited Henderson with having coined the term "organic education" in his 1902 book Education and the Larger Life which was one of her educational bibles. Henderson was then a rival of John Dewey in the education reform movement.

He was a prolific author who wrote about progressive education, manual training for boys, the value of hand work and the benefits of summer camps. Henderson's reputation rests largely on his academic papers published in periodicals such as Popular Science, Harper's Magazine, the Atlantic Monthly and the North American Review. His books include: Elements of Physics (1900); Education and the Larger Life (1902); John Percyfield: The Anatomy of Cheerfulness (1903); Children of Good Fortune (1905); Lighted Lamp (1908); Pay-day (1911); What It Is to Be Educated (1914).

Henderson was an elected Member of the American Philosophical Society (1896).

In retirement he designed and maintained a summer home in the Arts and Crafts style in the artist’s colony of Tryon, North Carolina. Henderson's winter home was in Daytona Beach, Florida, where he died in 1941.
