= Alonzo E. Deitz =

American lock manufacturer

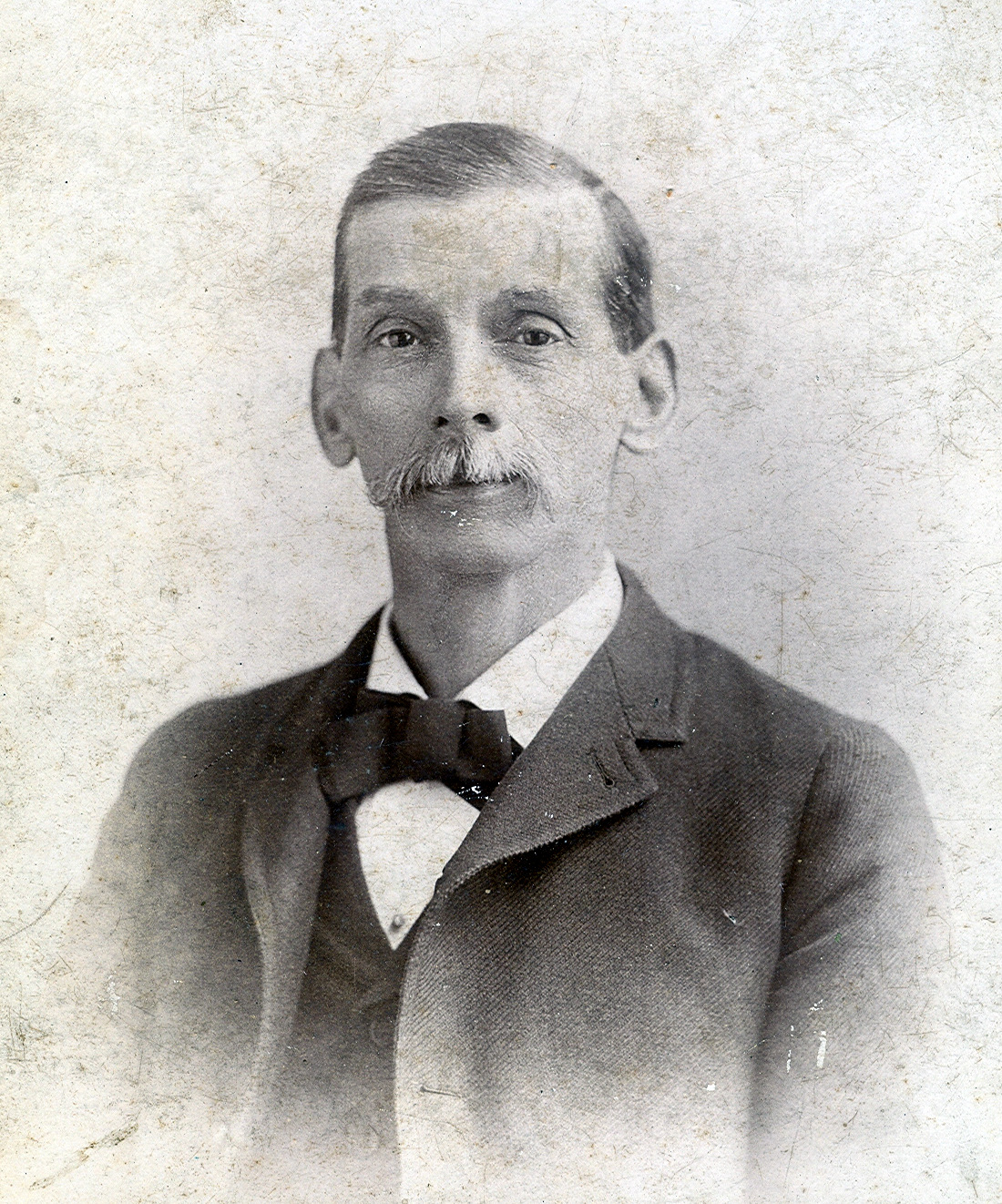
A. E. Deitz in 1891

Alonzo Edward Deitz (c. 1836 in New York – 1921) was an American lock manufacturer who founded the A. E. Deitz lock company in Brooklyn, New York in 1861. Deitz held two patents for innovative locks with a distinctive pin tumbler arrangement parallel to the longitudinal axis of the key. His steam-powered factory with 60 employees was established at Clymer Street in Brooklyn, adjacent to the Brooklyn Navy Yard. Hundreds of different models were available in published catalogs, including padlocks and locks for doors and drawers. Deitz locks were exported worldwide during the late 19th and early 20th centuries.
