= Division of Maranoa =

Australian federal electoral division

Coordinates: 25.807°S 144.718°E

Maranoa Australian House of Representatives Division
- Interactive map of boundaries since the 2019 federal election
- Created: 1901
- MP: David Littleproud
- Party: National (Note: Member of the Liberal National Party of Queensland sitting with the federal parliamentary National Party.)
- Namesake: Maranoa River
- Electors: 115,570 (2025)
- Area: 729,897 km^{2} (281,814.8 sq mi)
- Demographic: Rural
Electorates around Maranoa:
Kennedy	Kennedy	Capricornia, Flynn
Lingiari (NT)	Maranoa	Wide Bay, Maranoa, Groom
Grey (SA)	Parkes (NSW), New England (NSW), Page (NSW)	Wright

The Division of Maranoa is an Australian electoral division in the state of Queensland.

Maranoa extends across the Southern Outback and is the largest electorate in Queensland and the fifth largest federal electorate in Australia, being three times the size of Victoria. Maranoa is noted for its strong conservatism; in the 2016, 2019 and 2025 federal elections, Pauline Hanson's One Nation finished ahead of Labor on preference count, reaching a peak in 2016 with 17.82% of the primary vote.

Maranoa is a stronghold for the Liberal National Party of Queensland. The current MP is David Littleproud, former Minister of Agriculture and former leader of the National Party.

== Geography ==
Since 1984, federal electoral division boundaries in Australia have been determined at redistributions by a redistribution committee appointed by the Australian Electoral Commission. Redistributions occur for the boundaries of divisions in a particular state, and they occur every seven years, or sooner if a state's representation entitlement changes or when divisions of a state are malapportioned.

== History ==
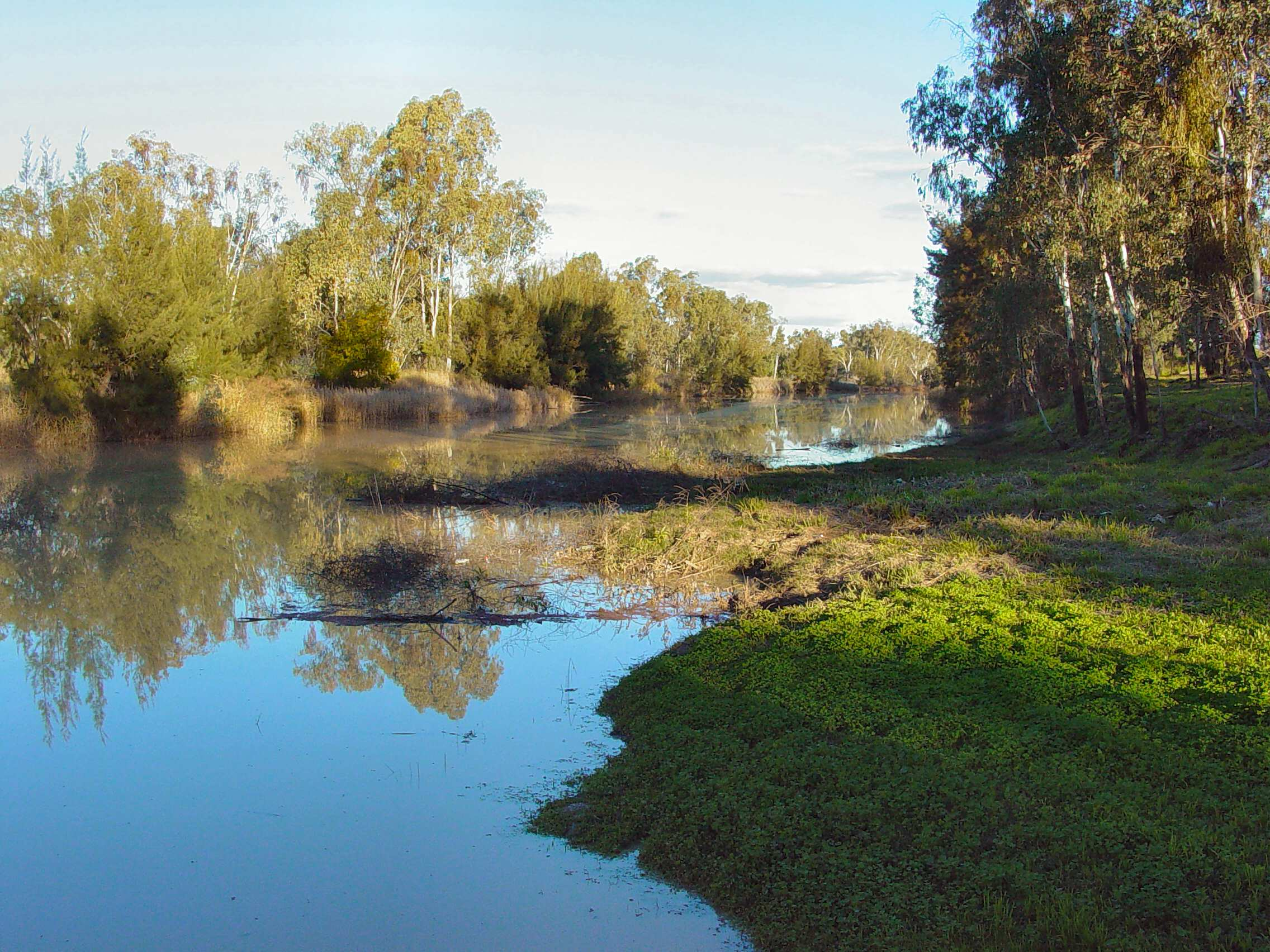
The Maranoa River, the division's namesake

The division was proclaimed in 1900, and was one of the original 65 divisions to be contested at the first federal election. It is named after the Maranoa River, which runs through the division. Located in the mostly rural southwestern portion of the state, towns located in Maranoa include Charleville, Cunnamulla, Dalby, Roma, Kingaroy, Stanthorpe, Winton and Warwick.

Maranoa is a comfortably safe seat for The Nationals; it was the first Queensland seat won by that party. Originally a safe Labor seat, it has been in National hands for all but three years since a 1921 by-election, and without interruption since 1943. Maranoa was taken by the then-Country Party in 1943 despite a landslide Labor victory nationally—one of only seven seats won by the Country Party. At the 2016, 2019 federal elections, and 2025 federal elections One Nation overtook Labor for second place after preferences were distributed.

At the 2025 election, Maranoa was the Coalition's safest seat; Littleproud sits on a majority of 20 percent against One Nation.

The seat was nicknamed the 'Kingdom of Maranoa' by John Howard after it returned the highest 'No' vote in the 1999 referendum on Australia becoming a republic. The seat's then MP, Bruce Scott, put the result down to the electorate being "well informed". 24 years later, in the Indigenous Voice referendum, the seat would again return the highest 'No' vote against the proposition; earning it the new nickname 'The No Capital of Australia'.

== Members ==
Image	Member	Party	Term	Notes
	Jim Page (1861–1921)	Labor	30 March 1901 – 3 June 1921	Served as Chief Government Whip in the House under Fisher and Hughes. Died in office
	James Hunter (1882–1968)	Country	30 July 1921 – 27 August 1940	Served as minister under Lyons. Retired
	Frank Baker (1873–1959)	Labor	21 September 1940 – 21 August 1943	Lost seat
	Charles Adermann (1896–1979)	Country	21 August 1943 – 10 December 1949	Transferred to the Division of Fisher
	Charles Russell (1907–1977)	Country	10 December 1949 – 7 October 1950	Previously held the Legislative Assembly of Queensland seat of Dalby. Lost seat
	Charles Russell (1907–1977)	Independent	7 October 1950 – 28 April 1951	Previously held the Legislative Assembly of Queensland seat of Dalby. Lost seat
	Wilfred Brimblecombe (1898–1973)	Country	28 April 1951 – 31 October 1966	Retired
	James Corbett (1908–2005)	Country	26 November 1966 – 2 May 1975	Retired
	James Corbett (1908–2005)	National Country	2 May 1975 – 19 September 1980	Retired
	Ian Cameron (1938–)	National Country	18 October 1980 – 16 October 1982	Retired
	Ian Cameron (1938–)	Nationals	16 October 1982 – 19 February 1990	Retired
	Bruce Scott (1943–)	Nationals	24 March 1990 – 9 May 2016	Served as minister under Howard. Served as Deputy Speaker under Gillard, Rudd, Abbott and Turnbull. Retired
	David Littleproud (1976–)	Nationals	2 July 2016 – present	Served as minister under Turnbull and Morrison. Incumbent. Served as leader of the National Party from 2022 to 2026.

== Election results ==
2025 Australian federal election: Maranoa
Party	Candidate	Votes	%	±%
Liberal National	David Littleproud	51,947	53.18	−3.08
Labor	Alex Newman	15,675	16.05	+0.76
One Nation	Sharon Duncan	12,018	12.30	+0.41
People First	Rod Draper	5,552	5.68	+5.68
Greens	Elizabeth Johnston	5,032	5.15	+0.28
Family First	John Matthew Whittle	2,802	2.87	+2.87
Trumpet of Patriots	Jonathan Allen Cumes	2,764	2.83	+1.76
Libertarian	Michael Offerdahl	1,897	1.94	+1.94
Total formal votes		97,687	94.57	−2.07
Informal votes		5,606	5.43	+2.07
Turnout		103,293	89.42	+1.03
Notional two-party-preferred count
Liberal National	David Littleproud	72,253	73.96	+1.84
Labor	Alex Newman	25,434	26.04	−1.84
Two-candidate-preferred result
Liberal National	David Littleproud	68,476	70.10	−2.02
One Nation	Sharon Duncan	29,211	29.90	+29.90
Liberal National hold				
