= Trusts & Trustees =

- Discipline: Trust law
- Language: English
- Edited by: Toby Graham, Tony Molloy

Publication details
- History: 1994-present
- Publisher: Oxford University Press
- Frequency: 10/year

Standard abbreviations
- ISO 4: Trusts Trustees

Indexing
- ISSN: 1363-1780 (print); 1752-2110 (web)
- LCCN: 2007211006
- OCLC no.: 475595973

Links
- Journal homepage; Online access; Online archive

Trusts & Trustees is a peer-reviewed law journal published ten times per year by Oxford University Press. The journal covers trust law and practice, including case notes on topical cases and updates on trends and developments from around the world. The editors-in-chief are Thomas Fletcher, Benjamin Lister, David Russell AM KC, and Johanna Niegel.
