= National Federation of Australia Japan Societies =

National Federation of Australia Japan Societies (NFAJS)
- Abbreviation: NFAJS
- Formation: 1975
- Type: Federation – Not for profit – National community organisation
- Legal status: Community
- Purpose: Promotion of cultures of Australia and Japan to each other
- Headquarters: Sydney, NSW, Australia
- Region served: Asia, Oceania
- Members: 15–20 groups with hundreds of individual members
- Official language: English with many Japanese speaking members
- President: Philip Mitchell Sydney – (Max 4 year Term in office)
- Website: http://www.austjapanfed.org.au/
- Remarks: Facilitators of a National Bi-Annual Conference

The National Federation of Australia Japan Societies (NFAJS) is a federation of societies that promote the importance of the relationship between the peoples of Japan and Australia.

== Memberships ==
Australian Capital Territory

- Australia-Japan Society Inc

New South Wales

- Australia-Japan Society of NSW Inc
- Australia-Japan Society of Coffs Harbour
- Cowra Japan Society

Northern Territory

- Australian-Japanese Association of the NT Inc.

Queensland

- Australia-Japan Society Queensland Inc
- Australia-Japan Society Far North Queensland
- Australia-Japan Society Sunshine Coast
- Australia-Japan Society Townsville

South Australia

- Australia Japan Association of South Australia
- Japan Australia Friendship Association

Tasmania

- Australia Japan Society (Tasmania) Inc.

Victoria

- Australia-Japan Society of Victoria Inc

Western Australia

- Australia-Japan Society – Western Australia Inc.
- Australia-Japan Society – Geraldton
- Australia-Japan Society – Broome
- Australia-Japan Society – Bunbury
