= Charles Adermann =

Australian politician (1896–1979)

The Right Honourable Sir Charles Adermann KBE
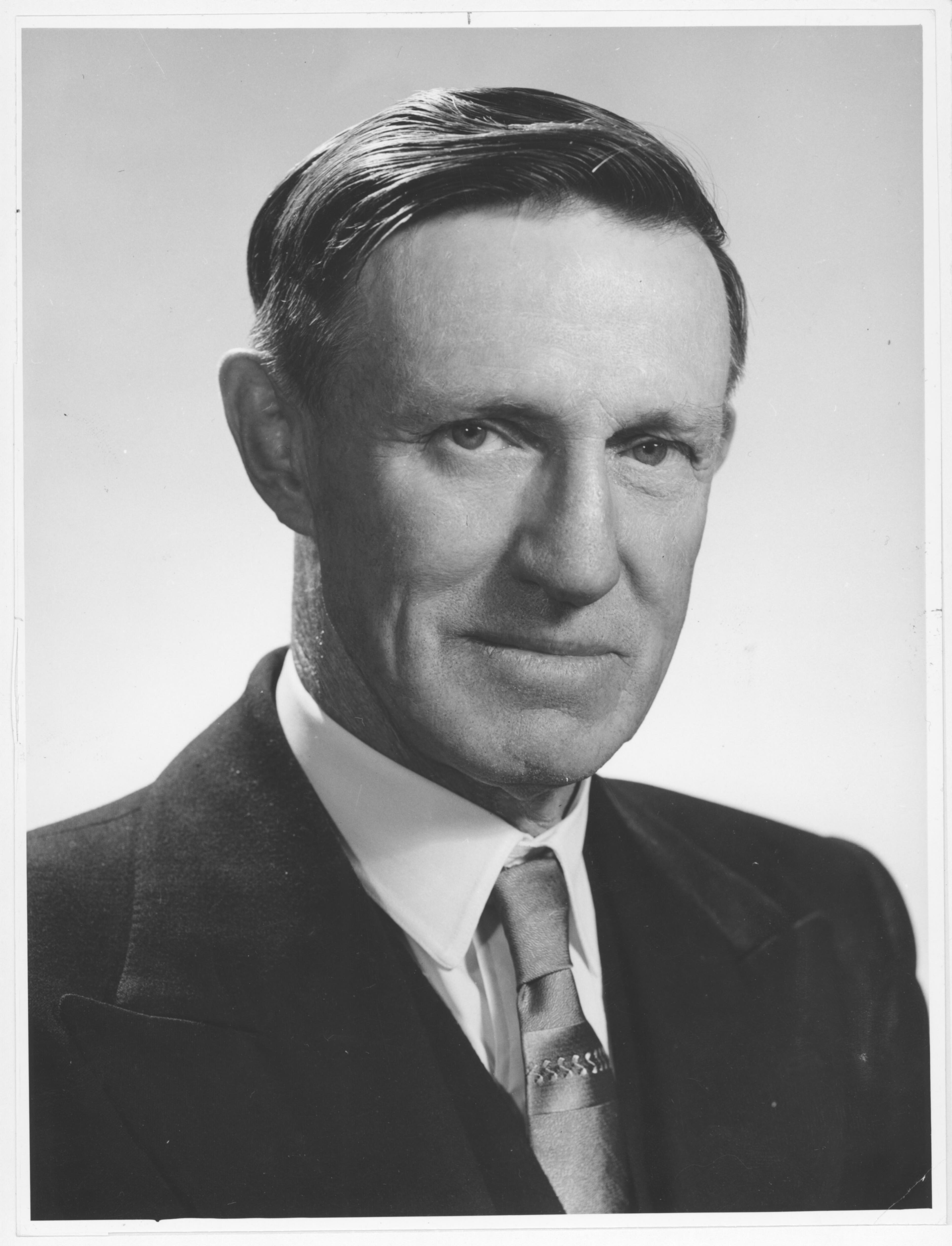

Minister for Primary Industry
- In office 10 December 1958 – 16 October 1967
- Prime Minister: Robert Menzies; Harold Holt
- Preceded by: William McMahon
- Succeeded by: Doug Anthony

Deputy Leader of the Country Party
- In office 11 December 1963 – 8 December 1966
- Leader: John McEwen
- Preceded by: Charles Davidson
- Succeeded by: Doug Anthony

Member of the Australian Parliament for Fisher
- In office 10 December 1949 – 2 November 1972
- Preceded by: New seat
- Succeeded by: Evan Adermann

Member of the Australian Parliament for Maranoa
- In office 21 August 1943 – 10 December 1949
- Preceded by: Frank Baker
- Succeeded by: Charles Russell

Personal details
- Born: 3 August 1896 near Lowood, Queensland, Australia
- Died: 9 May 1979 (aged 82) Dalby, Queensland, Australia
- Party: Country
- Spouse: Mildred Turner (m. 1926)
- Relations: Ernest Aderman (brother); Evan Adermann (son)
- Occupation: Peanut farmer

Sir Charles Frederick Adermann, KBE (3 August 1896 – 9 May 1979) was an Australian politician who served in the House of Representatives from 1943 to 1972, representing the Country Party. He was the party's deputy leader from 1964 to 1966 and served as Minister for Primary Industry from 1958 to 1967. He was a peanut farmer before entering politics.

== Early life ==
Adermann was born on 3 August 1896 at Vernor Siding near Lowood, Queensland. He was the eighth child of German immigrant parents Emilie (née Litzow) and Carl Friederich Adermann. His younger brother Ernest Aderman(n) became a member of parliament in New Zealand. Adermann grew up in Wooroolin where his parents established the first local branch of the Churches of Christ. He attended state schools until the age of 13, and later studied farm management by correspondence. During the First World War, he was rejected for military service on medical grounds, attempting to enlist after his brother Robert was killed in action in 1916.

Adermann became a leader of the South Burnett farming community. He served as chairman of the Peanut Board from 1925 to 1931 and 1934 to 1952, overseeing the establishment of a compulsory collective marketing system which processed, stored, and sold crops on behalf of peanut growers. Adermann married Mildred Turner in 1926, with whom he had two sons and two daughters. In 1938, he began a series of Sunday school radio broadcasts on 4SB under the name "Uncle John".

== Political career ==
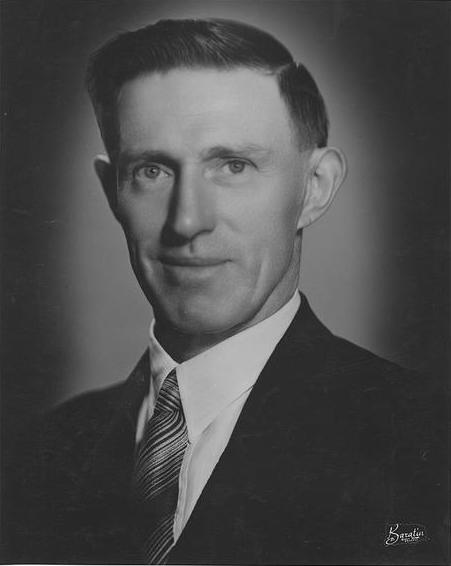
Adermann during the 1940s.

Adermann served on the Kingaroy Shire Council from 1939 to 1946. He was elected to the House of Representatives at the 1943 federal election, winning the seat of Maranoa for the Country Party from the incumbent Australian Labor Party (ALP) member Francis Baker. His seat the only non-Labor gain at the election and came against a nationwide swing to the ALP.

Adermann was re-elected to Maranoa at the 1946 election. He transferred to the newly created seat of Fisher at the 1949 election, winning re-election on a further eight occasions. He was re-elected unopposed at the 1955 election. He served as chairman of committees (deputy speaker) from 1950 to 1958.

=== Government minister ===
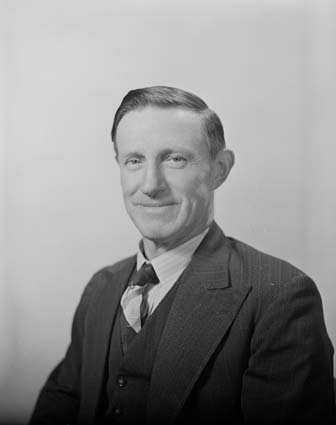
Adermann in 1956

Adermann was appointed Minister for Primary Industry in the Menzies ministry in December 1958 and was admitted to Cabinet in February 1960. He was responsible for granting additional assistance to rural producers. In 1964 he became Deputy Leader of the Country Party, a position he held until 1966. He was dropped from the ministry in 1967. He retired from parliament at the 1972 election and handed his seat to his son, Evan.

== Personal life ==
In 1926, Adermann married Mildred Turner, with whom he had four children. His son Evan succeeded him in the seat of Fisher and also became a federal government minister. His grandson Greg Adermann, who lived with Charles for a period the former's senior schooling years, has served as the Councillor for the Brisbane City Council Pullenvale Ward since March 2020.

Adermann died on 9 May 1979 at his daughter's house in Dalby, Queensland. He was interred at the Taabinga Cemetery near Kingaroy.

== See also ==
- Politics of Australia

Political offices
Preceded by William McMahon	Minister for Primary Industry; 1958–67	Succeeded by Doug Anthony
Parliament of Australia
Preceded by Frank Baker	Member for Maranoa; 1943–49	Succeeded by Charles Russell
New division	Member for Fisher; 1949–72	Succeeded by Evan Adermann
Party political offices
Preceded by Charles Davidson	Deputy Leader of the Country Party of Australia; 1964–66	Succeeded by Doug Anthony
