= Bruce Scott (Australian politician) =

Australian politician

The Honourable Bruce Scott AM
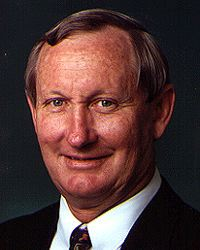

Minister for Veterans' Affairs
- In office 11 March 1996 – 26 November 2001
- Prime Minister: John Howard
- Preceded by: Con Sciacca
- Succeeded by: Danna Vale

Member of the Australian Parliament for Maranoa
- In office 24 March 1990 – 9 May 2016
- Preceded by: Ian Cameron
- Succeeded by: David Littleproud

Personal details
- Born: 20 October 1943 (age 83) Roma, Queensland, Australia
- Party: National

Bruce Craig Scott AM (born 20 October 1943) is an Australian former politician. He was a member of the National Party and represented the Division of Maranoa in the House of Representatives from 1990 to 2016. He served as Minister for Veterans' Affairs in the Howard government from 1996 to 2001.

== Early life ==
Scott was born in Roma, Queensland, and was educated at the Anglican Church Grammar School in Brisbane. Before entering politics, Scott was a wool and grain grower. He served as president of the Queensland Merino Stud Sheep Breeders Association, president of the Maranoa Graziers' Association and president of the Australian Association of Stud Merino Breeders. He was a Nuffield Farming Scholar in 1983.

== Politics ==
Scott was first elected to parliament at the 1990 federal election, retaining the Division of Maranoa that has been in Country/National hands for all but three years since 1921, and without interruption since 1943. He was a member of the Opposition Shadow Ministry 1992–96. He was Minister for Veterans' Affairs from 1996 to 2001, and also Minister Assisting the Minister for Defence from 1998 to 2001.

Following the resignation of Harry Jenkins Jr. as Speaker of the House on 24 November 2011, Scott was nominated for the position of Deputy Speaker of the House by Liberal MP Christopher Pyne. Scott accepted the nomination and a ballot took place, installing Anna Burke as the Deputy Speaker of the House. Following the resignation of Peter Slipper as Speaker on 9 October 2012, Burke was elected as his replacement. Scott was nominated by Pyne as Deputy; with his nomination seconded by Tony Windsor. Scott defeated Steve Georganas in a ballot.

Scott announced on 3 August 2015 that he would not stand in the next election.

Political offices
Preceded by Con Sciacca	Minister for Veterans' Affairs; 1996–2001	Succeeded by Danna Vale
Parliament of Australia
Preceded by Ian Cameron	Member for Maranoa; 1990–2016	Succeeded by David Littleproud
