= Charles Russell (Australian politician) =

Australian politician

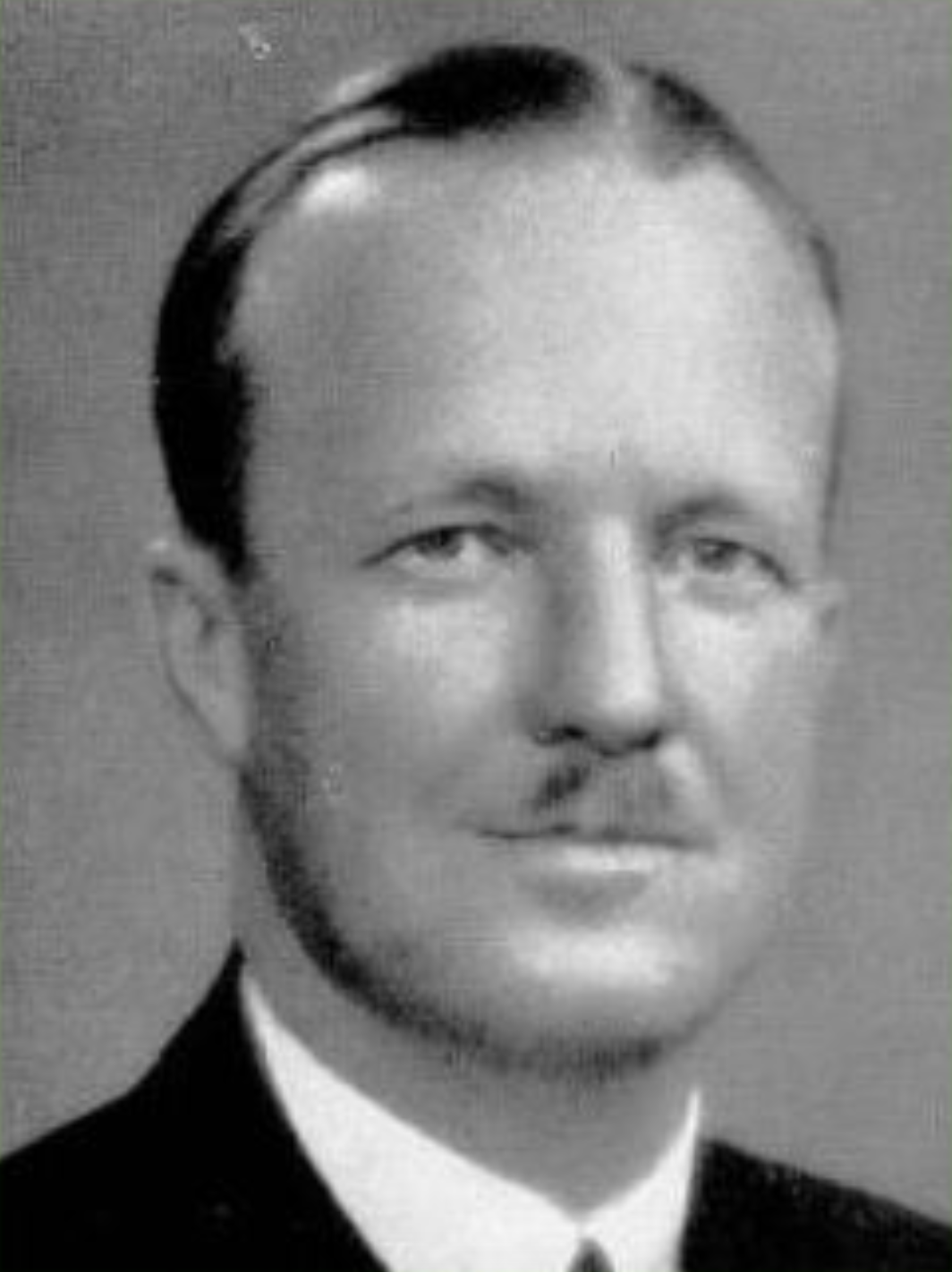

Member of the Queensland Parliament for Dalby
- In office 3 May 1947 – 28 October 1949
- Preceded by: Aubrey Slessar

Member of the Australian Parliament for Maranoa
- In office 10 December 1949 – 28 April 1951
- Preceded by: Charles Adermann
- Succeeded by: Wilfred Brimblecombe

Personal details
- Born: 24 April 1907 Manilla, New South Wales
- Died: 21 October 1977 (aged 70) Dalby, Queensland
- Party: Country (1949–50); Independent (1950–51); Democratic (1953)
- Spouse: Hilary Maude Newton
- Occupation: Grazier

Charles Wilfred Russell (24 April 1907 – 21 October 1977) was an Australian politician, pastoralist and right wing activist who served briefly in both the Queensland and federal parliaments. Initially a member of the Country Party, he later became one of its key critics and campaigned actively against it in the 1950s and 1960s. His successful court action invalidating the Queensland government's stock levy in 1977, in the last year of his life, was one of his most significant achievements.

== Early life ==
Russell was born at Willambi, Manilla, near Tamworth in New South Wales. He was the fourth of five children, and the only surviving son, born to grazier Wilfred Adams Russell (who served in the Legislative Assembly of Queensland 1926–32) and his wife Millicent, daughter of pastoralist Charles Baldwin. The family moved to Queensland in 1910, settling at Dalmally station near Roma. In 1923, Wilfred acquired Jimbour Station, a property in the Darling Downs built by Sir Joshua Bell. Charles was educated at Cranbrook School in Sydney, and later worked as a jackeroo on his father's western Queensland sheep stations. In 1930 he became manager of Nardoo station in Cunnamulla.

== Local politics and advocacy ==
Wilfred Russell died in 1932, and Charles inherited the family properties. Elected to Wambo Shire Council in 1932, he was a prominent spokesman for the wool industry and advocated the construction of all-weather roads. He joined the board of Sturmfels Primary Producers' Co-operative Association in 1937 and was influential in arranging its merger with the Queensland Primary Producers' Co-operative Association.

In 1934, Russell travelled to the United States, where he learned to fly and acquired his first aeroplane, a Beechcraft Staggerwing. He enlisted as an airman pilot in the Royal Australian Air Force on 10 February 1941, and by May was a flight lieutenant, serving as an instructor at training schools around Australia until his transfer to the RAAF Reserve on 28 February 1944.

== Family ==
On 27 July 1944 at St John's Anglican Cathedral in Brisbane Charles Russell married Hilary Maude Newton, daughter of pastoralist Frank Newton. Together they had one daughter and four sons, one of whom is David Russell QC, barrister and politician

== State and federal politics ==
In 1936, Russell had helped to found the Queensland Country Party, and contested the Legislative Assembly of Queensland seats of Warrego in 1938 and Dalby in 1944. In 1947, the beneficiary of a campaign organised by James Killen, Russell was elected to the seat of Dalby, and focused on transport, land settlement, decentralisation and rural industries. He described the atmosphere of the Parliament as "friendly" but was frustrated in Opposition, leading to his decision to transfer to federal politics. He was endorsed as the Country Party's candidate for the seat of Maranoa at the 1949 federal election and was easily elected.

Disillusioned by the federal party's inability to act on its election promises, Russell resigned from the parliamentary party on 7 October 1950 when the government refused to raise the exchange rate and imposed a tax on wool. He sat on the cross benches for the rest of his term and contested the 1951 federal election as an independent. He polled 29.9% of the vote behind Labor's candidate, Alfred Dohring, and the official Country candidate, Wilfred Brimblecombe. His preferences ensured Brimblecombe's victory over Dohring.

== Later life ==
Russell was expelled by the Country Party after the election and applied to join the Liberal Party, but was rejected. He was a candidate for the Senate in the 1953 Senate only election as third on the Democratic ticket headed by Sir Raphael Cilento. He attempted to regain Maranoa at the 1954 election and came third with 17.4%. The absence of a Labor candidate for Maranoa at the 1955 election gave him 43.7% of the vote, finishing with 48.9% of the two-candidate preferred vote. He later contested the Queensland state seat of Condamine in 1972.

Russell's wealth and prominent connexions allowed him to continue to campaign for his beliefs. He continued to challenge both the Country Party and the Menzies Government, losing a High Court appeal against the validity of the federal wool tax in 1965 but successfully invalidating the Queensland government's stock levy in 1977.

Russell's views placed him on the right of the political spectrum. He was devoted to anti-socialism and the British Empire, and was associated with several other men who were disaffected with the major political parties, including Cilento, George Griffiths and economist Colin Clark. Russell and Cilento formed the short-lived Australian Democratic Party during the 1950s, and in the 1960s he was a leader in the Basic Industries Group and held membership of the Federal Inland Development Organisation. Although he had links with the Australian League of Rights, he did not join the League as he was opposed to its espousal of Social Credit theories. He joined the Workers Party (later the Progress Party) in the 1970s.

Russell and his wife Hilary co-wrote a book on their property in 1955, Jimbour: Its History and Development; Jimbour House was classified by the National Trust of Queensland and became a popular entertainment venue. Russell published his autobiography, Country Crisis, in 1976.

Russell died at Dalby Hospital of a cerebral haemorrhage on 20 October 1977, a day after he collapsed while speaking at a meeting of the Maranoa branch of the Progress Party. He was survived by his wife, their daughter and their four sons. He was cremated.

Parliament of Australia
Preceded by Charles Adermann	Member for Maranoa; 1949 – 1951	Succeeded by Wilfred Brimblecombe
Parliament of Queensland
Preceded by Aubrey Slessar	Member for Dalby; 1947 – 1949	Abolished
