= James Hunter (politician) =

Australian politician (1882–1968)

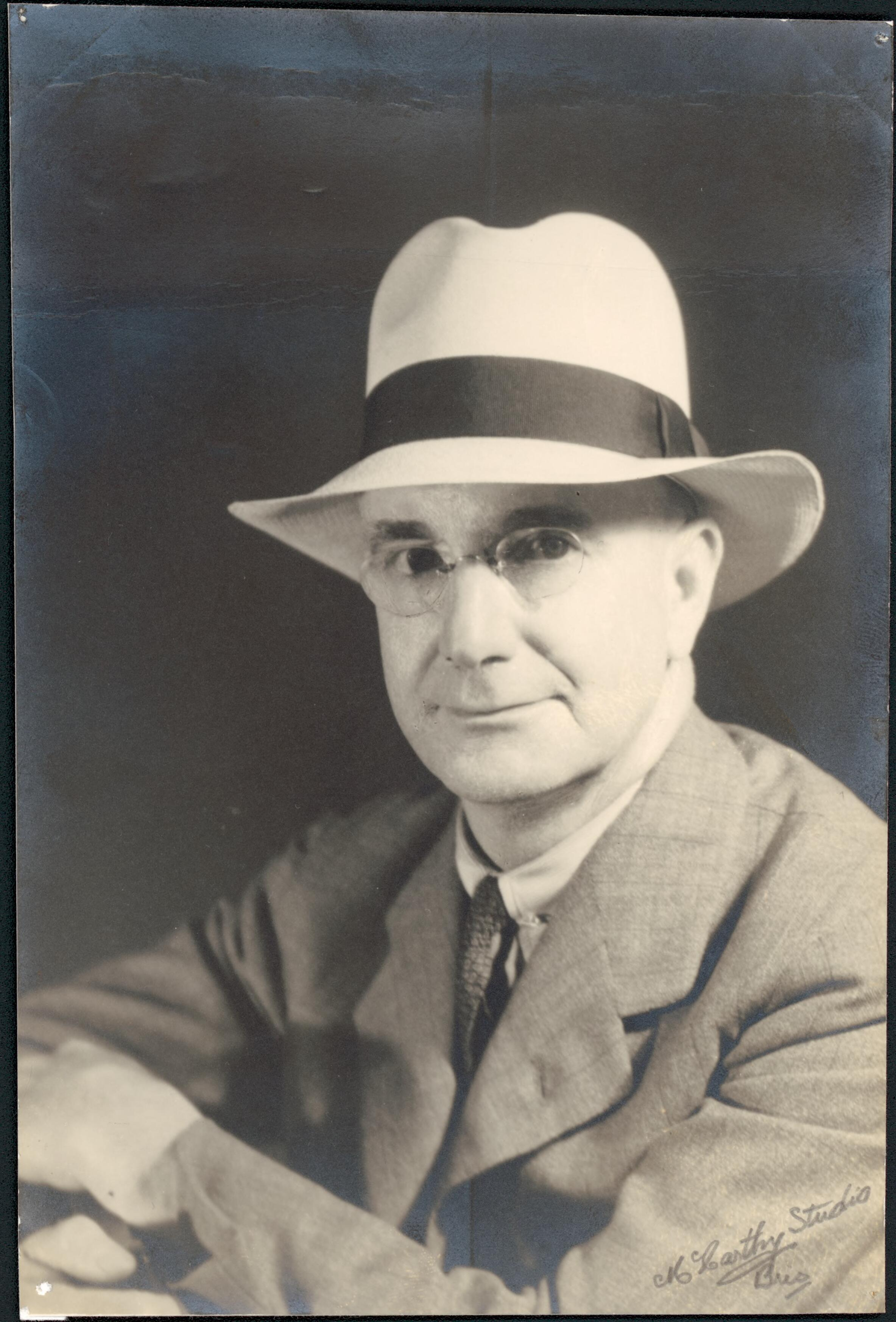

Member of the Australian Parliament for Maranoa
- In office 30 July 1921 – 27 August 1940
- Preceded by: Jim Page
- Succeeded by: Frank Baker

Personal details
- Born: 4 July 1882 Springburn, Scotland
- Died: 27 October 1968 (aged 86) Sandgate, Queensland
- Party: Australian Country Party
- Spouse: Florence Phoebe Nason (d. 1960)
- Children: 2 sons
- Occupation: Accountant

James Aitchison Johnston Hunter (4 July 1882 – 27 October 1968) was an Australian politician.

Hunter was born at Springburn, near Glasgow, Scotland and migrated with his family to Brisbane in 1884 educated there. He joined the state public service and became an accountant in the Queensland Railways. In 1908, he married Florence Phoebe Nason, who came from a family of pastoralists established near Surat. She predeceased him in 1960 aged 76. In 1912, he set up as a public accountant at Dalby.

Hunter won the Australian House of Representatives seat of Maranoa at a 1921 by-election. In November 1934 he was appointed a minister without portfolio in the third Lyons ministry. He was not reappointed to the ministry after the November 1937 election. In 1936, he cofounded the Queensland Country Party, which replaced the Country and Progressive National Party in Queensland. He retired from parliament ahead of the November 1940 election.

Hunter died at a retirement home in the Brisbane suburb of Sandgate and was buried in Toowong Cemetery.

== Notes ==
Parliament of Australia
Preceded by Jim Page	Member for Maranoa; 1921–40	Succeeded by Frank Baker
