= William Dunstan (politician) =

Australian politician

The Hon William Dunstan
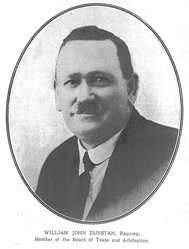

Member of the Queensland Legislative Council
- In office 19 February 1920 – 15 June 1921
- In office 15 August 1921 – 23 March 1922

Personal details
- Born: William John Dunstan; 13 October 1873 Beechworth, Victoria, Australia
- Died: 13 September 1930 (aged 56) Brisbane, Queensland, Australia
- Resting place: Toowong Cemetery
- Party: Labor
- Occupation: Gold and opal miner

William John Dunstan (13 October 1873 – 13 September 1930) was an Australian politician. He was a Labor member of the Queensland Legislative Council from 1920 to 1922, when the council was abolished.
