= Jim Page (politician) =

Australian politician

The Honourable Jim Page
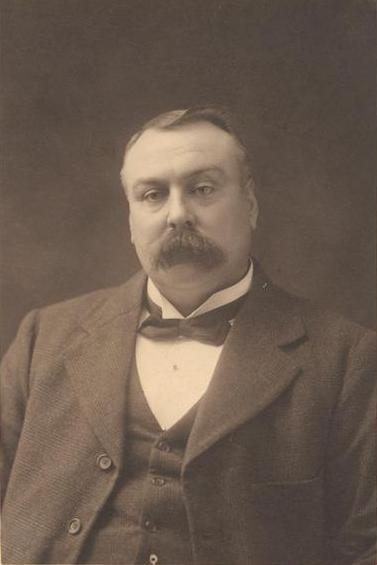

Member of the Australian Parliament for Maranoa
- In office 30 March 1901 – 3 June 1921
- Preceded by: New seat
- Succeeded by: James Hunter

Personal details
- Born: 1861 London, England
- Died: 3 June 1921 (aged 59–60) Moonee Ponds, Victoria, Australia
- Party: Australian Labor Party
- Occupation: Railway worker, unionist

James Page (1861 – 3 June 1921) was an Australian politician. He was an Australian Labor Party member of the Australian House of Representatives from 1901 until his death, representing the electorate of Maranoa.

== Early life ==
Page was born in London, England, and was raised and educated in a Barnardo's Home. He joined the British Army, serving from 1877 to 1883, and fighting as a gunner in the Royal Artillery in the Anglo-Zulu War, seeing action in the Battle of Rorke's Drift, and then again serving in the First Boer War. He "bought himself out of" the army after his war service and undertook casual work such as bricklaying, before migrating to Queensland in the 1880s on the ship Scottish Hero, arriving in Rockhampton with little to his name.

In Queensland, Page worked odd jobs such as fencer, navvy, bush carpenter and bricklayer, as a ganger on the Queensland Central Railway, and as overseer of works for the Barcaldine Divisional Board. He is occasionally reported as having been a shearer, and some form of union leader during the 1891 shearers strike, but that appears to be incorrect. He became the proprietor of the Welcome Home Hotel in Barcaldine in 1893, but gave up that lease in 1897 and took over the Exchange Hotel, which he operated until his election to parliament. He was Provincial Grand Master of the Rockhampton District and later Queensland Grand Master of the Independent Order of Odd Fellows and was a Past Master of the Barcaldine Masonic Lodge.

== Politics ==
In 1901, he was elected to the Australian House of Representatives in the first federal election, winning the Queensland rural seat of Maranoa for the Labor Party. He held the position of party whip from 1913. He held the seat until his death in 1921.

In later years, Page "disposed of his western interests" and lived for several years in Brisbane. He had reportedly had "some months of painful illness" in 1920, including an eye condition that left him facing possible blindness. Page died in his bed in Moonee Ponds, Melbourne, on 3 June 1921; although he had been ill the previous year, he had been active in the House as late as the previous day and his death was sudden and unexpected. His funeral was held at St John's Cathedral in Brisbane, and he was buried in Toowong Cemetery.

Parliament of Australia
New seat	Member for Maranoa; 1901–1921	Succeeded by James Hunter
