= Charles Hodgdon =

American politician

Charles W. Hodgdon
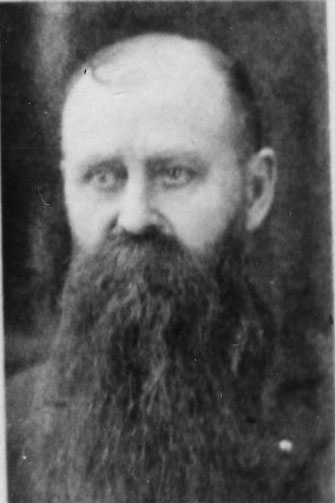
- Hodgdon in 1917

Member of the Washington House of Representatives for the 30th district
- In office 1917–1919

Personal details
- Born: September 5, 1861 New York, United States
- Died: September 27, 1948 (aged 87) Grays Harbor County, Washington, United States
- Party: Democratic

Charles W. Hodgdon (September 5, 1861 – September 27, 1948) was an American politician in the state of Washington. He served in the Washington House of Representatives from 1917 to 1919.
