= Frank R. Baker =

American politician

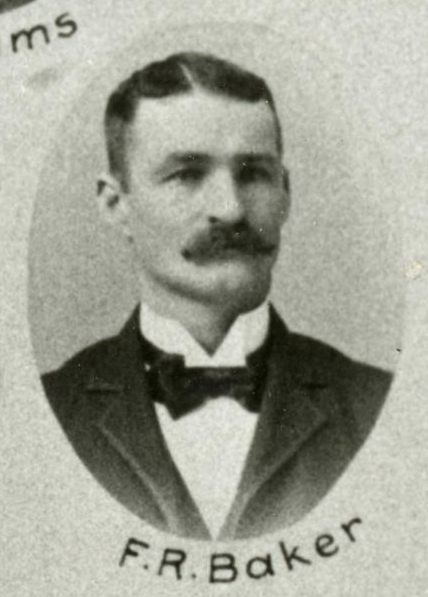
- Baker in 1895

Member of the Washington House of Representatives from the 37th district
- In office January 9, 1893 – January 9, 1899
- Preceded by: S. J. Smyth
- Succeeded by: A. R. Heilig

Personal details
- Born: Frank Rinaldo Baker; November 11, 1861 Bentonsport, Iowa, U.S.
- Died: April 9, 1952 (aged 90) Riverside County, California, U.S.
- Party: Populist
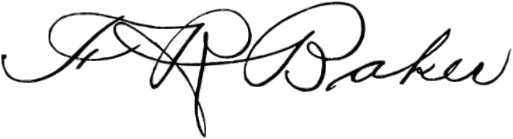
- Signature

Frank Rinaldo Baker (November 11, 1861 – April 9, 1952) was an American politician in the state of Washington. He served in the Washington House of Representatives.
