= Francis Patrick Baker =

Australian politician (1873–1959)

Frank Baker
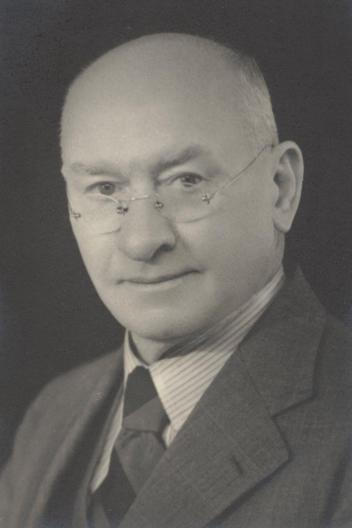

Member of the Australian Parliament for Maranoa
- In office 21 September 1940 – 21 August 1943
- Preceded by: James Hunter
- Succeeded by: Charles Adermann

Personal details
- Born: 30 May 1873 Leyburn, Queensland
- Died: 2 June 1959 (aged 86)
- Party: Australian Labor Party
- Children: Frank Baker
- Occupation: Teacher

Francis Patrick Baker (30 May 1873 – 2 June 1959) was an Australian politician, serving one term as the representative for seat of Maranoa in the Australian House of Representatives from September 1940 to August 1943.

== Early life and career ==
Baker was born in Leyburn, Queensland, Australia on 30 May 1873. Educated in private schools in Queensland, Baker became a state school teacher for 10 years before serving as an Inspector for Schools for a further 20 years.

== Political career ==
In 1940, Baker was elected to represent the seat of Maranoa in the Australian House of Representatives as a member of the Australian Labor Party—only the second time Labor had ever won this normally safe conservative seat in the remote west of Queensland. Baker was narrowly beaten in the 1943 federal election by Charles Adermann of the Australian Country Party, becoming the only Labor incumbent to be defeated in an election that saw Labor win its most-ever seats in the House at the time.

In Parliament, Baker called for a moratorium on farm foreclosures during World War II. He also argued for the need to maintain a sufficient workforce in rural employment to ensure the continuity of primary production in support of the war effort. Baker supported the placement of refugee doctors in rural communities, stating that when large numbers of local doctors were enlisting in the armed services, suitably qualified refugees were needed to meet the health care needs in smaller country towns. He was an outspoken supporter of the National Security Act and the Government's right to use whatever financial means necessary to defend Australia during the war.

Between 1931 and 1939, Baker's son, Francis Matthew John Baker, served as a member of the House of Representatives for the electorate of Oxley and then the electorate of Griffith. Baker senior's election in 1940 is the only instance where a father has been elected to the Australian federal parliament after his son.

== After politics ==
After losing his parliamentary seat, Baker became a grazier in Beaudesert, Queensland. He died on 2 June 1959 and was buried in South Brisbane Cemetery.

.

Parliament of Australia
Preceded by James Hunter	Member for Maranoa; 1940–1943	Succeeded by Charles Adermann
