= Candidates of the 1937 Australian federal election =

This article provides information on candidates who stood for the 1937 Australian federal election. The election was held on 23 October 1937.

In 1936, the Lang Labor group had been reabsorbed into the Australian Labor Party. Seats are still designated as being held by Lang Labor.

== By-elections, appointments and defections ==
=== By-elections and appointments ===
- On 1 June 1935, David Oliver Watkins (Labor) was elected to succeed his father David Watkins (Labor) as the member for Newcastle.
- On 17 August 1935, Harold Holt (UAP) was elected to succeed George Maxwell (UAP) as the member for Fawkner.
- On 26 September 1935, Guy Arkins (UAP) was appointed a New South Wales Senator to replace Lionel Courtenay (UAP).
- On 19 August 1936, Thomas Marwick (Country) was appointed a Western Australian Senator replace William Carroll (Country).
- On 12 December 1936, Bill Riordan (Labor) was elected to succeed Darby Riordan (Labor) as the member for Kennedy.
- On 19 December 1936, Arthur Fadden (Country) was elected to succeed Sir Littleton Groom (UAP) as the member for Darling Downs.
- On 8 May 1937, William Scully (Labor) was elected to succeed Aubrey Abbott (Country) as the member for Gwydir.
- On 2 September 1937, Ben Courtice (Labor) was appointed a Queensland Senator to replace John MacDonald (Labor).
- On 21 October 1937, Philip McBride (UAP) was appointed a South Australian Senator to replace Oliver Badman (Country).

=== Defections ===
- In 1936, the Australian Labor Party (NSW) was reabsorbed into the Australian Labor Party. NSW Labor members rejoined the federal party: Jack Beasley (West Sydney), Joe Clark (Darling), Joe Gander (Reid), Jock Garden (Cook), Rowley James (Hunter), Bert Lazzarini (Werriwa), Dan Mulcahy (Lang), Sol Rosevear (Dalley) and Eddie Ward (East Sydney).

== Redistributions and seat changes ==
- Redistributions of electoral boundaries occurred in Victoria and Western Australia.
  - In Victoria, the Country-held seat of Echuca was abolished. A new seat, Deakin (notionally UAP), was created.
    - The member for Echuca, John McEwen (Country), contested Indi.
    - The member for Indi, William Hutchinson (UAP), contested Deakin.
  - There were minimal changes in Western Australia.
- The member for Lilley (Qld), Sir Donald Cameron (UAP), contested the Senate.
- South Australian Senator Oliver Badman (Country) resigned from the Senate to contest Grey, as part of a Coalition deal that saw Philip McBride (UAP), the member for Grey, appointed to Badman's vacancy in the Senate.

== Retiring Members and Senators ==
=== Labor ===
- Jock Garden MP (Cook, NSW)

=== United Australia ===
- Archibald Fisken MP (Ballaarat, Vic)
- Eric Harrison MP (Bendigo, Vic)
- Senator Charles Cox (NSW)
- Senator Jack Duncan-Hughes (SA)
- Senator Sir Walter Massy-Greene (NSW)

== House of Representatives ==
Sitting members at the time of the election are shown in bold text. Successful candidates are highlighted in the relevant colour. Where there is possible confusion, an asterisk (*) is also used.

=== New South Wales ===
Electorate	Held by	Labor candidate	Coalition candidate	Other candidates
Barton	United Australia	John Donovan	**Albert Lane** (UAP)	Stanley Allen (SC)
Calare	Country	William Folster	**Harold Thorby** (CP)	
Cook	Labor (NSW)	Tom Sheehan		Cyril Glassop (Ind Lab)
Cowper	Country	Abraham Brindley	**Earle Page** (CP)	
Dalley	Labor (NSW)	**Sol Rosevear**	Arthur Brough (UAP)	
Darling	Labor (NSW)	**Joe Clark**		Alexander Huie (Ind)
East Sydney	Labor (NSW)	**Eddie Ward**	Arthur Butterell (UAP)	Thomas Grant (Ind); Louis Phillips (Ind)
Eden-Monaro	United Australia	Claude Allen	**John Perkins** (UAP)	
Gwydir	Labor	**William Scully**	Ernest Batchelor (CP)	
Hume	Country	Essell Hoad	**Thomas Collins** (CP)	
Hunter	Labor (NSW)	**Rowley James**		
Lang	Labor (NSW)	**Dan Mulcahy**	Matthew Calman (UAP)	Ernest Carr (SC)
Macquarie	United Australia	Tony Luchetti	**John Lawson** (UAP)	
Martin	United Australia	Stan Taylor	**William McCall** (UAP)	George Carruthers (SC)
New England	Country	Leigh Cuthbertson	**Victor Thompson** (CP)	
Newcastle	Labor	**David Watkins**		Hilton Sykes (Ind)
North Sydney	United Australia	Henry Clayden	**Billy Hughes** (UAP)	Percival Minahan (SC)
Parkes	United Australia	Karl Guhl	**Sir Charles Marr** (UAP)	
Parramatta	United Australia	Albert Rowe	**Sir Frederick Stewart** (UAP)	Dick George (Ind); Harold Meggitt (Ind)
Reid	Labor (NSW)	**Joe Gander**	Reuben Jenner (UAP)	
Richmond	Country	Jim Fredericks	Larry Anthony* (CP); Robert Gibson (CP); **Roland Green** (CP)	
Riverina	Country	William Quirk	**Horace Nock** (CP)	Robert Ballantyne (Ind)
Robertson	United Australia	Gordon Cross	**Sydney Gardner** (UAP)	John Metcalfe (Ind)
Warringah	United Australia	Walter Salter	**Sir Archdale Parkhill** (UAP)	Joseph Hamlet (Ind UAP); Percy Spender* (Ind UAP)
Watson	United Australia	William Dignam	**John Jennings** (UAP)	
Wentworth	United Australia	Thomas Conway	**Eric Harrison** (UAP)	
Werriwa	Labor (NSW)	**Bert Lazzarini**	Henry Storey (UAP)	
West Sydney	Labor (NSW)	**Jack Beasley**		

=== Northern Territory ===
Electorate	Held by	Labor candidate	Independent candidates
Northern Territory	Independent	Robert Toupein	**Adair Blain***; Ronald Hughes-Jones; Harold Nelson

=== Queensland ===
Electorate	Held by	Labor candidate	Coalition candidate	Social Credit candidate	Communist candidate
Brisbane	Labor	**George Lawson**	Graham Hart (UAP)	Ambrose Sawtell	
Capricornia	Labor	**Frank Forde**	Edwin Hiskens (CP)	John Harding	
Darling Downs	Country	Leslie Bailey	**Arthur Fadden** (CP)	Arthur Rushton	
Griffith	Labor	**Francis Baker**	Dugald Clark (UAP)	William Moore	
Herbert	Labor	**George Martens**	James Wilkie (CP)	Henry Beck	Fred Paterson
Kennedy	Labor	**Bill Riordan**	Alex Kippen (CP)	Herbert Price	
Lilley	United Australia	Edmund Taylor	William Jolly (UAP)	Harry Cash	
Maranoa	Country	Randolph Bedford	**James Hunter** (CP)	Henry Madden	
Moreton	United Australia	John McCoy	**Josiah Francis** (UAP)	Henry Hogg	
Wide Bay	Country	George Watson	**Bernard Corser** (CP)	Geoffrey Nichols	

=== South Australia ===
Electorate	Held by	Labor candidate	Coalition candidate	Other candidates
Adelaide	United Australia	Ken Bardolph; Herbert George; George Edwin Yates	**Fred Stacey** (UAP)	
Barker	Country		**Archie Cameron** (CP)	Charles Lloyd (Ind)
Boothby	United Australia	Kevin McEntee; Leonard Pilton	**John Price** (UAP)	William Hardy (Ind)
Grey	United Australia	James Marner	Oliver Badman (CP)	Alfred Parker (Ind)
Hindmarsh	Labor	**Norman Makin**	Harry Hatwell (UAP)	
Wakefield	United Australia	Raymond Davis	**Charles Hawker** (UAP)	

=== Tasmania ===
Electorate	Held by	Labor candidate	UAP candidate	Other candidates
Bass	Labor	**Claude Barnard**	Allan Guy	John Watson (Ind)
Darwin	United Australia	Edwin Brown	**George Bell**	
Denison	Labor	**Gerald Mahoney**	Sir John McPhee	Maxwell Hickman (Ind Lab); Athol Smith (SC)
Franklin	Labor	**Charles Frost**	Hugh Warner	
Wilmot	United Australia	Lancelot Spurr; Maurice Weston	**Joseph Lyons**	

=== Victoria ===
Electorate	Held by	Labor candidate	Coalition candidate	Other candidates
Balaclava	United Australia	Phillip Nash	**Thomas White** (UAP)	John Atkinson (Ind)
Ballaarat	United Australia	Reg Pollard	Stanley Walker (UAP)	
Batman	Labor	**Frank Brennan**	Albert Peters (UAP)	
Bendigo	United Australia	Ernest Duus	Walter Pearce (UAP); George Rankin* (CP)	
Bourke	Labor	**Maurice Blackburn**	Richard Griffiths (UAP)	
Corangamite	United Australia	Arthur Haywood	**Geoffrey Street** (UAP)	
Corio	United Australia	Leo Carmody	**Richard Casey** (UAP)	
Deakin	United Australia	Paul Jones	**William Hutchinson** (UAP)	
Fawkner	United Australia	William Doran	**Harold Holt** (UAP)	William Bottomley (Ind)
Flinders	United Australia		**James Fairbairn*** (UAP); Reginald Skeat (CP)	Alexander Amess (SC); Ralph Gibson (CPA)
Gippsland	Country	James L McKenna	**Thomas Paterson** (CP)	
Henty	United Australia	Sydney Walker	**Sir Henry Gullett** (UAP)	Rupert Hornabrook (Ind)
Indi	Country	William Hartshorne	**John McEwen** (CP)	
Kooyong	United Australia	Thomas Brennan	**Robert Menzies** (UAP)	Leslie Hollins (Ind)
Maribyrnong	Labor	**Arthur Drakeford**	Malcolm Fenton (UAP)	Edward Turner (Ind)
Melbourne	Labor	**William Maloney**		
Melbourne Ports	Labor	**Jack Holloway**		
Wannon	United Australia	Don McLeod	Robert Rankin (CP); **Thomas Scholfield*** (UAP)	
Wimmera	Country		**Hugh McClelland** (CP)	Alexander Wilson (Ind)
Yarra	Labor	**James Scullin**	Douglas Knight (UAP)	

=== Western Australia ===
Electorate	Held by	Labor candidate	Coalition candidate	Independent candidates
Forrest	Country	Ernest Hoar	**John Prowse** (CP)	
Fremantle	Labor	**John Curtin**	Eric Isaachsen (UAP)	Henry Wright
Kalgoorlie	Labor	**Albert Green**	Stephen Kellow (UAP)	
Perth	United Australia	Tom Burke	**Walter Nairn*** (UAP); Jack Simons (UAP)	Viv James
Swan	Country	John Steele	**Henry Gregory** (CP)	

== Senate ==
Sitting Senators are shown in bold text.

=== New South Wales ===
Four seats were up for election. One of these was a short-term vacancy caused by United Australia Party Senator Lionel Courtenay's death; this had been filled in the interim by Guy Arkins. The United Australia Party-Country Party Coalition was defending four seats. United Australia Party Senator Dick Dein and Country Party Senator Mac Abbott were not up for re-election.

Labor candidates	Coalition candidates	Other candidates
Stan Amour*; John Armstrong*; Tom Arthur*; Bill Ashley*	**Guy Arkins** (UAP); David Hall (UAP); **Charles Hardy** (CP); Basil Helmore (UAP)	Peter Pollack (Ind)

=== Queensland ===
Three seats were up for election. The Labor Party was defending three seats. United Australia Party Senators Thomas Crawford and Harry Foll and Country Party Senator Walter Cooper were not up for re-election.

Labor candidates	Coalition candidates	Social Credit candidates
**Gordon Brown***; **Joe Collings***; **Ben Courtice***	Frederick Annand (UAP); Sir Donald Cameron (UAP); James Heading (CP)	John Aird; Bertram Allen; William Argaet

=== South Australia ===
Three seats were up for election. The United Australia Party was defending three seats. United Australia Party Senators James McLachlan, George McLeay and Oliver Uppill were not up for re-election.

Labor candidates	UAP candidates	Group A candidates	Other candidates
John Daly; Edgar Dawes; Bert Hoare; Mick O'Halloran; Frederick Ward; Michael Woods	**Philip McBride***; **Alexander McLachlan***; Keith Wilson*	Thomas Dunsford; Ernest Evans; Frederick James	Jeanne Young (Ind)

=== Tasmania ===
Three seats were up for election. The United Australia Party was defending three seats. United Australia Party Senators Charles Grant, John Hayes and Herbert Hays were not up for re-election.

Labor candidates	UAP candidates
Bill Aylett*; Richard Darcey*; Charles Lamp*; Herbert McKay	Donald Cameron; Ernest Freeland; Henry McFie; **John Millen**; **Herbert Payne**; **Burford Sampson**

=== Victoria ===
Three seats were up for election. The United Australia Party was defending three seats. United Australia Party Senators Charles Brand and John Leckie and Country Party Senator William Gibson were not up for re-election.

Labor candidates	UAP candidates	Country candidates	Other candidates
John Barnes*; Don Cameron*; Richard Keane*	**Tom Brennan**; **James Guthrie**; **William Plain**	George Budge; Samuel Geddes; James Marchbank	Marcus Wettenhall (Ind)

=== Western Australia ===
Three seats were up for election. The United Australia Party-Country Party Coalition was defending three seats. United Australia Party Senators Herbert Collett and Allan MacDonald and Country Party Senator Bertie Johnston were not up for re-election.

Labor candidates	Coalition candidates	Other candidates
Robert Clothier*; James Cunningham*; James Fraser*	**Patrick Lynch** (UAP); **Thomas Marwick** (CP); **Sir George Pearce** (UAP)	Carlyle Ferguson (Ind)

== See also ==
- 1937 Australian federal election
- Members of the Australian House of Representatives, 1934–1937
- Members of the Australian House of Representatives, 1937–1940
- Members of the Australian Senate, 1935–1938
- Members of the Australian Senate, 1938–1941
- List of political parties in Australia
