= 1937 Australian House of Representatives election =

Australian federal election, 23 October 1937 House of Representatives << 1934–1940 >>
| Enrolled voters | 4,080,038 | | | | |
| Votes cast | 3,699,269 | | Turnout | 95.17 | –0.96 |
| Informal votes | 95,928 | | Informal | 2.59 | –0.85 |
Summary of votes by party
| Party | Primary votes | % | Swing | Seats | Change |
| Labor | 1,555,737 | 43.17% | +16.36% | 29 | + 11 |
| United Australia | 1,214,526 | 33.71% | +0.73% | 28 | ± 0 |
| Country | 560,279 | 12.61% | +2.93% | 15 | + 1 |
| Social Credit | 79,432 | 2.20% | –2.49% | 0 | ± 0 |
| Communist | 17,153 | 0.48% | –0.86% | 0 | ± 0 |
| Independent | 176,214 | 4.89% | +2.38% | 2 | + 2 |
| Total | 3,603,341 | | | 74 | |

This is a list of electoral division results for the Australian 1937 federal election.

== New South Wales ==
=== Barton ===
1937 Australian federal election: Barton
| Party | Candidate | Votes | % | ±% |
|---|---|---|---|---|
| United Australia | Albert Lane | 28,342 | 49.3 | +2.9 |
| Labor | John Donovan | 23,539 | 41.0 | +41.0 |
| Social Credit | Stanley Allen | 5,562 | 9.7 | −1.4 |
| Total formal votes | | 57,443 | 97.9 | |
| Informal votes | | 1,254 | 2.1 | |
| Turnout | | 58,697 | 98.0 | |
Two-party-preferred result
| United Australia | Albert Lane | 29,780 | 51.8 | +0.4 |
| Labor | John Donovan | 27,663 | 48.2 | −0.4 |
| United Australia hold | | Swing | +0.4 | |

=== Calare ===
1937 Australian federal election: Calare
| Party | Candidate | Votes | % | ±% |
|---|---|---|---|---|
| Country | Harold Thorby | 26,378 | 52.2 | +17.0 |
| Labor | William Folster | 24,114 | 47.8 | +41.5 |
| Total formal votes | | 50,492 | 98.2 | |
| Informal votes | | 921 | 1.8 | |
| Turnout | | 51.413 | 96.5 | |
| Country hold | | Swing | −1.8 | |

=== Cook ===
1937 Australian federal election: Cook
| Party | Candidate | Votes | % | ±% |
|---|---|---|---|---|
| Labor | Tom Sheehan | 38,201 | 70.3 | +45.2 |
| Independent Labor | Cyril Glassop | 16,125 | 29.7 | +29.7 |
| Total formal votes | | 56,642 | 95.9 | |
| Informal votes | | 2,316 | 4.1 | |
| Turnout | | 56,642 | 97.0 | |
| Labor gain from Labor (NSW) | | Swing | +78.6 | |

=== Cowper ===
1937 Australian federal election: Cowper
| Party | Candidate | Votes | % | ±% |
|---|---|---|---|---|
| Country | Earle Page | 32,000 | 63.2 | −1.0 |
| Labor | Abraham Brindley | 18,646 | 36.8 | +36.8 |
| Total formal votes | | 50,646 | 98.3 | |
| Informal votes | | 888 | 1.7 | |
| Turnout | | 51,534 | 95.9 | |
| Country hold | | Swing | −7.2 | |

=== Dalley ===
1937 Australian federal election: Dalley
| Party | Candidate | Votes | % | ±% |
|---|---|---|---|---|
| Labor | Sol Rosevear | 32,646 | 57.7 | +51.0 |
| United Australia | Arthur Brough | 23,961 | 42.3 | +4.0 |
| Total formal votes | | 56,607 | 97.7 | |
| Informal votes | | 1,305 | 2.3 | |
| Turnout | | 57,912 | 96.9 | |
| Labor gain from Labor (NSW) | | Swing | −0.1 | |

=== Darling ===
1937 Australian federal election: Darling
| Party | Candidate | Votes | % | ±% |
|---|---|---|---|---|
| Labor | Joe Clark | 32,515 | 66.2 | +37.6 |
| Independent | Alexander Huie | 16,581 | 33.8 | +33.8 |
| Total formal votes | | 49,096 | 97.3 | |
| Informal votes | | 1,347 | 2.7 | |
| Turnout | | 50,443 | 94.6 | |
| Labor gain from Labor (NSW) | | Swing | +66.2 | |

=== East Sydney ===
1937 Australian federal election: East Sydney
| Party | Candidate | Votes | % | ±% |
|---|---|---|---|---|
| Labor | Eddie Ward | 28,484 | 56.0 | +51.3 |
| United Australia | Arthur Butterell | 20,429 | 40.2 | −2.1 |
| Independent | Thomas Grant | 1,603 | 3.2 | +3.2 |
| Independent | Louis Phillips | 348 | 0.7 | +0.7 |
| Total formal votes | | 50,864 | 97.0 | |
| Informal votes | | 1,587 | 3.0 | |
| Turnout | | 52,451 | 93.7 | |
Two-party-preferred result
| Labor | Eddie Ward | | 58.0 | +58.0 |
| United Australia | Arthur Butterell | | 42.0 | −2.1 |
| Labor gain from Labor (NSW) | | Swing | +2.1 | |

=== Eden-Monaro ===
1937 Australian federal election: Eden-Monaro
| Party | Candidate | Votes | % | ±% |
|---|---|---|---|---|
| United Australia | John Perkins | 28,872 | 57.5 | +0.9 |
| Labor | Claude Allen | 21,299 | 42.5 | +33.7 |
| Total formal votes | | 50,171 | 98.3 | |
| Informal votes | | 863 | 1.7 | |
| Turnout | | 51,034 | 97.3 | |
| United Australia hold | | Swing | −1.3 | |

=== Gwydir ===
1937 Australian federal election: Gwydir
| Party | Candidate | Votes | % | ±% |
|---|---|---|---|---|
| Labor | William Scully | 27,140 | 52.4 | +0.1 |
| Country | Ernest Batchelor | 24,679 | 47.6 | −4.9 |
| Total formal votes | | 51,819 | 98.9 | |
| Informal votes | | 601 | 1.1 | |
| Turnout | | 52,420 | 96.8 | |
| Labor hold | | Swing | +6.9 | |

=== Hume ===
1937 Australian federal election: Hume
| Party | Candidate | Votes | % | ±% |
|---|---|---|---|---|
| Country | Thomas Collins | 27,784 | 54.1 | +1.2 |
| Labor | Essell Hoad | 23,526 | 45.9 | +32.1 |
| Total formal votes | | 51,310 | 98.4 | |
| Informal votes | | 853 | 1.6 | |
| Turnout | | 52,163 | 96.4 | |
| Country hold | | Swing | −2.3 | |

=== Hunter ===
1937 Australian federal election: Hunter
| Party | Candidate | Votes | % | ±% |
|---|---|---|---|---|
| Labor | Rowley James | unopposed | | |
| Labor gain from Labor (NSW) | | Swing | | |

=== Lang ===
1937 Australian federal election: Lang
| Party | Candidate | Votes | % | ±% |
|---|---|---|---|---|
| Labor | Dan Mulcahy | 28,379 | 50.4 | +43.3 |
| United Australia | Matthew Calman | 25,547 | 45.3 | +7.4 |
| Social Credit | Ernest Carr | 2,435 | 4.3 | −6.7 |
| Total formal votes | | 56,361 | 97.5 | |
| Informal votes | | 1,437 | 2.5 | |
| Turnout | | 57,798 | 97.5 | |
Two-party-preferred result
| Labor | Dan Mulcahy | | 52.6 | +52.6 |
| United Australia | Matthew Calman | | 47.4 | +4.5 |
| Labor gain from Labor (NSW) | | Swing | −4.5 | |

=== Macquarie ===
1937 Australian federal election: Macquarie
| Party | Candidate | Votes | % | ±% |
|---|---|---|---|---|
| United Australia | John Lawson | 26,392 | 52.1 | +6.8 |
| Labor | Tony Luchetti | 24,272 | 47.9 | +27.1 |
| Total formal votes | | 50,664 | 98.4 | |
| Informal votes | | 827 | 1.6 | |
| Turnout | | 51,491 | 98.6 | |
| United Australia hold | | Swing | −1.3 | |

=== Martin ===
1937 Australian federal election: Martin
| Party | Candidate | Votes | % | ±% |
|---|---|---|---|---|
| United Australia | William McCall | 30,971 | 56.1 | +2.5 |
| Labor | Stan Taylor | 20,186 | 36.6 | +29.4 |
| Social Credit | George Carruthers | 4,009 | 7.3 | −3.0 |
| Total formal votes | | 55,166 | 97.7 | |
| Informal votes | | 1,304 | 2.3 | |
| Turnout | | 56,470 | 97.6 | |
Two-party-preferred result
| United Australia | William McCall | | 60.3 | −0.2 |
| Labor | Stan Taylor | | 39.7 | +0.2 |
| United Australia hold | | Swing | −0.2 | |

=== New England ===
1937 Australian federal election: New England
| Party | Candidate | Votes | % | ±% |
|---|---|---|---|---|
| Country | Victor Thompson | 29,994 | 61.0 | +16.9 |
| Labor | Leigh Cuthbertson | 19,196 | 39.0 | +39.0 |
| Total formal votes | | 49,190 | 97.7 | |
| Informal votes | | 1,141 | 2.3 | |
| Turnout | | 50,331 | 96.4 | |
| Country hold | | Swing | −0.7 | |

=== Newcastle ===
1937 Australian federal election: Newcastle
| Party | Candidate | Votes | % | ±% |
|---|---|---|---|---|
| Labor | David Watkins | 44,085 | 79.3 | +21.2 |
| Independent | Hilton Sykes | 11,579 | 20.7 | +20.7 |
| Total formal votes | | 55,579 | 95.9 | |
| Informal votes | | 2,379 | 4.1 | |
| Turnout | | 57,958 | 97.3 | |
| Labor hold | | Swing | +21.2 | |

=== North Sydney ===
1937 Australian federal election: North Sydney
| Party | Candidate | Votes | % | ±% |
|---|---|---|---|---|
| United Australia | Billy Hughes | 38,386 | 65.9 | +0.8 |
| Labor | Henry Clayden | 16,254 | 27.9 | +27.9 |
| Social Credit | Percival Minahan | 3,568 | 6.1 | −5.6 |
| Total formal votes | | 58,208 | 97.7 | |
| Informal votes | | 1,344 | 2.3 | |
| Turnout | | 59,552 | 97.2 | |
Two-party-preferred result
| United Australia | Billy Hughes | | 69.0 | −2.0 |
| Labor | Henry Clayden | | 31.0 | +31.0 |
| United Australia hold | | Swing | −2.0 | |

=== Parkes ===
1937 Australian federal election: Parkes
| Party | Candidate | Votes | % | ±% |
|---|---|---|---|---|
| United Australia | Sir Charles Marr | 35,468 | 63.7 | +3.7 |
| Labor | Karl Guhl | 20,217 | 36.3 | +36.3 |
| Total formal votes | | 55,685 | 98.1 | |
| Informal votes | | 1,050 | 1.9 | |
| Turnout | | 56,735 | 96.8 | |
| United Australia hold | | Swing | −2.6 | |

=== Parramatta ===
1937 Australian federal election: Parramatta
| Party | Candidate | Votes | % | ±% |
|---|---|---|---|---|
| United Australia | Sir Frederick Stewart | 37,972 | 67.9 | +2.8 |
| Labor | Albert Rowe | 14,747 | 26.4 | +22.4 |
| Independent | Dick George | 2,118 | 3.8 | +3.8 |
| Independent | Harold Meggitt | 1,100 | 2.0 | +2.0 |
| Total formal votes | | 55,937 | 97.4 | |
| Informal votes | | 1,504 | 2.6 | |
| Turnout | | 57,441 | 96.4 | |
Two-party-preferred result
| United Australia | Sir Frederick Stewart | | 69.8 | +0.4 |
| Labor | Albert Rowe | | 30.2 | +30.2 |
| United Australia hold | | Swing | +0.4 | |

=== Reid ===
1937 Australian federal election: Reid
| Party | Candidate | Votes | % | ±% |
|---|---|---|---|---|
| Labor | Joe Gander | 33,738 | 60.3 | +3.5 |
| United Australia | Reuben Jenner | 22,239 | 39.7 | +7.7 |
| Total formal votes | | 55,977 | 96.4 | |
| Informal votes | | 1,468 | 2.6 | |
| Turnout | | 57,445 | 96.8 | |
| Labor gain from Labor (NSW) | | Swing | +60.3 | |

=== Richmond ===
1937 Australian federal election: Richmond
| Party | Candidate | Votes | % | ±% |
|---|---|---|---|---|
| Country | Roland Green | 15,842 | 30.3 | −1.2 |
| Labor | Jim Fredericks | 15,253 | 29.3 | +29.3 |
| Country | Larry Anthony | 12,524 | 24.1 | +24.1 |
| Country | Robert Gibson | 8,433 | 16.2 | +16.2 |
| Total formal votes | | 52,052 | 97.6 | |
| Informal votes | | 1,276 | 2.4 | |
| Turnout | | 53,328 | 97.0 | |
Two-party-preferred result
| Country | Larry Anthony | 28,940 | 55.6 | +4.5 |
| Country | Roland Green | 23,112 | 44.4 | +44.4 |
| Country hold | | Swing | +4.5 | |

=== Riverina ===
1937 Australian federal election: Riverina
| Party | Candidate | Votes | % | ±% |
|---|---|---|---|---|
| Country | Horace Nock | 24,756 | 49.4 | −5.6 |
| Labor | William Quirk | 20,182 | 40.3 | +27.2 |
| Independent | Robert Ballantyne | 5,165 | 10.3 | +10.3 |
| Total formal votes | | 50,103 | 98.1 | |
| Informal votes | | 975 | 1.9 | |
| Turnout | | 51,078 | 95.7 | |
Two-party-preferred result
| Country | Horace Nock | 28,661 | 57.2 | −2.1 |
| Labor | William Quirk | 21,442 | 42.8 | +2.1 |
| Country hold | | Swing | −2.1 | |

=== Robertson ===
1937 Australian federal election: Robertson
| Party | Candidate | Votes | % | ±% |
|---|---|---|---|---|
| United Australia | Sydney Gardner | 24,691 | 47.6 | +5.0 |
| Labor | Gordon Cross | 22,923 | 44.2 | +44.2 |
| Independent | John Metcalfe | 4,220 | 8.1 | +8.1 |
| Total formal votes | | 51,834 | 97.1 | |
| Informal votes | | 1,553 | 2.9 | |
| Turnout | | 53,387 | 96.2 | |
Two-party-preferred result
| United Australia | Sydney Gardner | 27,544 | 53.1 | −3.1 |
| Labor | Gordon Cross | 24,290 | 46.9 | +46.9 |
| United Australia hold | | Swing | −3.1 | |

=== Warringah ===
1937 Australian federal election: Warringah
| Party | Candidate | Votes | % | ±% |
|---|---|---|---|---|
| United Australia | Sir Archdale Parkhill | 26,568 | 43.9 | −27.4 |
| Ind. United Australia | Percy Spender | 17,322 | 28.6 | +28.6 |
| Labor | Walter Salter | 8,494 | 14.0 | +14.0 |
| Ind. United Australia | Joseph Hamlet | 8,200 | 13.5 | +13.5 |
| Total formal votes | | 60,584 | 98.2 | |
| Informal votes | | 1,118 | 1.8 | |
| Turnout | | 61,702 | 97.2 | |
Two-party-preferred result
| Ind. United Australia | Percy Spender | 31,446 | 51.9 | +51.9 |
| United Australia | Sir Archdale Parkhill | 29,138 | 48.1 | −29.4 |
| Ind. United Australia gain from United Australia | | Swing | +29.4 | |

=== Watson ===
1937 Australian federal election: Watson
| Party | Candidate | Votes | % | ±% |
|---|---|---|---|---|
| United Australia | John Jennings | 31,187 | 53.8 | −1.1 |
| Labor | William Dignam | 26,788 | 46.2 | +39.7 |
| Total formal votes | | 57,975 | 98.0 | |
| Informal votes | | 1,157 | 2.0 | |
| Turnout | | 59,132 | 96.5 | |
| United Australia hold | | Swing | −4.9 | |

=== Wentworth ===
1937 Australian federal election: Wentworth
| Party | Candidate | Votes | % | ±% |
|---|---|---|---|---|
| United Australia | Eric Harrison | 40,398 | 67.4 | +1.7 |
| Labor | Thomas Conway | 19,499 | 32.6 | +32.6 |
| Total formal votes | | 59,897 | 97.8 | |
| Informal votes | | 1,343 | 2.2 | |
| Turnout | | 61,240 | 96.1 | |
| United Australia hold | | Swing | −3.6 | |

=== Werriwa ===
1937 Australian federal election: Werriwa
| Party | Candidate | Votes | % | ±% |
|---|---|---|---|---|
| Labor | Bert Lazzarini | 31,188 | 55.3 | +51.9 |
| United Australia | Henry Storey | 25,190 | 44.7 | −1.4 |
| Total formal votes | | 56,378 | 97.8 | |
| Informal votes | | 1,241 | 2.2 | |
| Turnout | | 57,619 | 96.9 | |
| Labor gain from Labor (NSW) | | Swing | +55.3 | |

=== West Sydney ===
1937 Australian federal election: West Sydney
| Party | Candidate | Votes | % | ±% |
|---|---|---|---|---|
| Labor | Jack Beasley | unopposed | | |
| Labor gain from Labor (NSW) | | Swing | | |

== Victoria ==
=== Balaclava ===
1937 Australian federal election: Balaclava
| Party | Candidate | Votes | % | ±% |
|---|---|---|---|---|
| United Australia | Thomas White | 36,602 | 58.1 | −13.7 |
| Labor | Phillip Nash | 13,746 | 21.8 | −2.0 |
| Independent | John Atkinson | 12,613 | 20.0 | +20.0 |
| Total formal votes | | 62,961 | 97.9 | |
| Informal votes | | 1,321 | 2.1 | |
| Turnout | | 64,282 | 96.5 | |
Two-party-preferred result
| United Australia | Thomas White | | 67.1 | −6.9 |
| Labor | Phillip Nash | | 32.9 | +6.9 |
| United Australia hold | | Swing | −6.9 | |

=== Ballaarat ===
1937 Australian federal election: Ballaarat
| Party | Candidate | Votes | % | ±% |
|---|---|---|---|---|
| Labor | Reg Pollard | 24,784 | 50.6 | +5.7 |
| United Australia | Stanley Walker | 24,186 | 49.4 | +16.1 |
| Total formal votes | | 48,970 | 99.1 | |
| Informal votes | | 467 | 0.9 | |
| Turnout | | 49,437 | 97.1 | |
| Labor gain from United Australia | | Swing | +3.5 | |

=== Batman ===
1937 Australian federal election: Batman
| Party | Candidate | Votes | % | ±% |
|---|---|---|---|---|
| Labor | Frank Brennan | 36,439 | 63.4 | +8.6 |
| United Australia | Albert Peters | 21,013 | 36.6 | −8.6 |
| Total formal votes | | 57,452 | 98.2 | |
| Informal votes | | 1,037 | 1.8 | |
| Turnout | | 58,489 | 96.9 | |
| Labor hold | | Swing | +8.6 | |

=== Bendigo ===
1937 Australian federal election: Bendigo
| Party | Candidate | Votes | % | ±% |
|---|---|---|---|---|
| Labor | Ernest Duus | 18,834 | 39.5 | −0.5 |
| Country | George Rankin | 15,081 | 31.6 | +7.6 |
| United Australia | Walter Pearce | 13,748 | 28.8 | −6.4 |
| Total formal votes | | 47,663 | 98.5 | |
| Informal votes | | 740 | 1.5 | |
| Turnout | | 48,403 | 96.0 | |
Two-party-preferred result
| Country | George Rankin | 27,100 | 56.9 | −0.3 |
| Labor | Ernest Duus | 20,563 | 43.1 | +0.3 |
| Country gain from United Australia | | Swing | −0.3 | |

=== Bourke ===
1937 Australian federal election: Bourke
| Party | Candidate | Votes | % | ±% |
|---|---|---|---|---|
| Labor | Maurice Blackburn | 38,793 | 68.1 | +8.4 |
| United Australia | Richard Griffiths | 18,162 | 31.9 | −2.6 |
| Total formal votes | | 56,955 | 97.5 | |
| Informal votes | | 1,460 | 2.5 | |
| Turnout | | 58,415 | 96.7 | |
| Labor hold | | Swing | +3.2 | |

=== Corangamite ===
1937 Australian federal election: Corangamite
| Party | Candidate | Votes | % | ±% |
|---|---|---|---|---|
| United Australia | Geoffrey Street | 25,788 | 53.9 | +13.8 |
| Labor | Arthur Haywood | 22,096 | 46.1 | +9.3 |
| Total formal votes | | 47,884 | 99.0 | |
| Informal votes | | 494 | 1.0 | |
| Turnout | | 48,378 | 96.5 | |
| United Australia hold | | Swing | −5.7 | |

=== Corio ===
1937 Australian federal election: Corio
| Party | Candidate | Votes | % | ±% |
|---|---|---|---|---|
| United Australia | Richard Casey | 28,845 | 56.5 | −1.5 |
| Labor | Leo Carmody | 22,170 | 43.5 | +4.1 |
| Total formal votes | | 51,015 | 98.6 | |
| Informal votes | | 701 | 1.4 | |
| Turnout | | 51,716 | 96.7 | |
| United Australia hold | | Swing | −1.8 | |

=== Deakin ===
1937 Australian federal election: Deakin
| Party | Candidate | Votes | % | ±% |
|---|---|---|---|---|
| United Australia | William Hutchinson | 30,442 | 59.7 | +5.5 |
| Labor | Paul Jones | 20,512 | 40.3 | +9.5 |
| Total formal votes | | 50,954 | 98.2 | |
| Informal votes | | 911 | 1.8 | |
| Turnout | | 51,865 | 95.8 | |
| United Australia hold | | Swing | −6.7 | |

=== Fawkner ===
1937 Australian federal election: Fawkner
| Party | Candidate | Votes | % | ±% |
|---|---|---|---|---|
| United Australia | Harold Holt | 33,277 | 55.1 | −12.4 |
| Labor | William Doran | 17,124 | 28.4 | +2.7 |
| Independent | William Bottomley | 9,941 | 16.5 | +16.5 |
| Total formal votes | | 60,342 | 97.4 | |
| Informal votes | | 1,602 | 2.6 | |
| Turnout | | 61,944 | 93.8 | |
Two-party-preferred result
| United Australia | Harold Holt | | 62.4 | −8.5 |
| Labor | William Doran | | 37.6 | +8.5 |
| United Australia hold | | Swing | −8.5 | |

=== Flinders ===
1937 Australian federal election: Flinders
| Party | Candidate | Votes | % | ±% |
|---|---|---|---|---|
| United Australia | James Fairbairn | 27,085 | 53.0 | −7.9 |
| Country | Reginald Skeat | 12,497 | 24.5 | −15.9 |
| Social Credit | Alexander Amess | 6,884 | 13.5 | +13.5 |
| Communist | Ralph Gibson | 4,630 | 9.1 | +2.1 |
| Total formal votes | | 51,096 | 96.8 | |
| Informal votes | | 1,709 | 3.2 | |
| Turnout | | 52,805 | 96.5 | |
Two-party-preferred result
| United Australia | James Fairbairn | | 61.7 | −9.6 |
| Country | Reginald Skeat | | 38.3 | +38.3 |
| United Australia hold | | Swing | −9.6 | |

=== Gippsland ===
1937 Australian federal election: Gippsland
| Party | Candidate | Votes | % | ±% |
|---|---|---|---|---|
| Country | Thomas Paterson | 29,069 | 61.1 | |
| Labor | James McKenna | 18,483 | 38.9 | |
| Total formal votes | | 47,552 | 98.4 | |
| Informal votes | | 765 | 1.6 | |
| Turnout | | 48,317 | 96.2 | |
| Country hold | | Swing | | |

=== Henty ===
1937 Australian federal election: Henty
| Party | Candidate | Votes | % | ±% |
|---|---|---|---|---|
| United Australia | Sir Henry Gullett | 31,574 | 53.0 | −3.5 |
| Labor | Sydney Walker | 19,324 | 32.5 | +8.3 |
| Independent | Rupert Hornabrook | 8,647 | 14.5 | +14.5 |
| Total formal votes | | 59,545 | 97.6 | |
| Informal votes | | 1,450 | 2.4 | |
| Turnout | | 60,995 | 96.2 | |
Two-party-preferred result
| United Australia | Sir Henry Gullett | | 60.3 | −5.9 |
| Labor | Sydney Walker | | 39.7 | +5.9 |
| United Australia hold | | Swing | −5.9 | |

=== Indi ===
1937 Australian federal election: Indi
| Party | Candidate | Votes | % | ±% |
|---|---|---|---|---|
| Country | John McEwen | 30,660 | 61.2 | +13.2 |
| Labor | William Hartshorne | 19,478 | 38.8 | +3.3 |
| Total formal votes | | 50,138 | 98.6 | |
| Informal votes | | 699 | 1.4 | |
| Turnout | | 50,837 | 96.7 | |
| Country hold | | Swing | −1.7 | |

=== Kooyong ===
1937 Australian federal election: Kooyong
| Party | Candidate | Votes | % | ±% |
|---|---|---|---|---|
| United Australia | Robert Menzies | 31,690 | 51.3 | −11.4 |
| Labor | Thomas Brennan | 15,247 | 24.7 | +6.6 |
| Independent | Leslie Hollins | 14,841 | 24.0 | +24.0 |
| Total formal votes | | 61,778 | 97.9 | |
| Informal votes | | 1,326 | 2.1 | |
| Turnout | | 63,104 | 95.6 | |
Two-party-preferred result
| United Australia | Robert Menzies | | 57.3 | −15.0 |
| Labor | Thomas Brennan | | 42.7 | +15.0 |
| United Australia hold | | Swing | −15.0 | |

=== Maribyrnong ===
1937 Australian federal election: Maribyrnong
| Party | Candidate | Votes | % | ±% |
|---|---|---|---|---|
| Labor | Arthur Drakeford | 37,111 | 62.3 | +12.5 |
| United Australia | Malcolm Fenton | 20,799 | 34.9 | −6.1 |
| Independent | Edward Turner | 1,703 | 2.9 | +2.9 |
| Total formal votes | | 59,613 | 97.7 | |
| Informal votes | | 1,376 | 2.3 | |
| Turnout | | 60,989 | 97.8 | |
Two-party-preferred result
| Labor | Arthur Drakeford | | 63.7 | +6.0 |
| United Australia | Malcolm Fenton | | 36.3 | −6.0 |
| Labor hold | | Swing | +6.0 | |

=== Melbourne ===
1937 Australian federal election: Melbourne
| Party | Candidate | Votes | % | ±% |
|---|---|---|---|---|
| Labor | William Maloney | unopposed | | |
| Labor hold | | Swing | | |

=== Melbourne Ports ===
1937 Australian federal election: Melbourne Ports
| Party | Candidate | Votes | % | ±% |
|---|---|---|---|---|
| Labor | Jack Holloway | unopposed | | |
| Labor hold | | Swing | | |

=== Wannon ===
1937 Australian federal election: Wannon
| Party | Candidate | Votes | % | ±% |
|---|---|---|---|---|
| Labor | Don McLeod | 19,520 | 39.3 | +6.9 |
| United Australia | Thomas Scholfield | 18,526 | 37.3 | +0.7 |
| Country | Robert Rankin | 11,618 | 23.4 | −6.6 |
| Total formal votes | | 49,664 | 98.6 | |
| Informal votes | | 700 | 1.4 | |
| Turnout | | 50,364 | 96.6 | |
Two-party-preferred result
| United Australia | Thomas Scholfield | 25,489 | 51.3 | −3.7 |
| Labor | Don McLeod | 24,175 | 48.7 | +3.7 |
| United Australia hold | | Swing | −3.7 | |

=== Wimmera ===
1937 Australian federal election: Wimmera
| Party | Candidate | Votes | % | ±% |
|---|---|---|---|---|
| Independent | Alexander Wilson | 24,179 | 51.9 | +51.9 |
| Country | Hugh McClelland | 22,396 | 48.1 | +14.8 |
| Total formal votes | | 46,575 | 98.9 | |
| Informal votes | | 541 | 1.1 | |
| Turnout | | 47,116 | 96.1 | |
| Independent gain from Country | | Swing | +2.9 | |

=== Yarra ===
1937 Australian federal election: Yarra
| Party | Candidate | Votes | % | ±% |
|---|---|---|---|---|
| Labor | James Scullin | 37,381 | 64.0 | +9.0 |
| United Australia | Douglas Knight | 20,999 | 36.0 | +0.2 |
| Total formal votes | | 58,380 | 97.7 | |
| Informal votes | | 1,393 | 2.3 | |
| Turnout | | 59,773 | 94.7 | |
| Labor hold | | Swing | +2.4 | |

== Queensland ==
=== Brisbane ===
1937 Australian federal election: Brisbane
| Party | Candidate | Votes | % | ±% |
|---|---|---|---|---|
| Labor | George Lawson | 28,818 | 51.5 | −0.4 |
| United Australia | Graham Hart | 24,808 | 44.3 | +5.2 |
| Social Credit | Ambrose Sawtell | 2,362 | 4.2 | +0.1 |
| Total formal votes | | 55,988 | 96.5 | |
| Informal votes | | 2,003 | 3.5 | |
| Turnout | | 57,991 | 94.6 | |
Two-party-preferred result
| Labor | George Lawson | | 53.6 | −4.9 |
| United Australia | Graham Hart | | 46.4 | +4.9 |
| Labor hold | | Swing | −4.9 | |

=== Capricornia ===
1937 Australian federal election: Capricornia
| Party | Candidate | Votes | % | ±% |
|---|---|---|---|---|
| Labor | Frank Forde | 27,221 | 50.4 | −9.9 |
| Country | Edwin Hiskens | 20,543 | 38.0 | +38.0 |
| Social Credit | John Harding | 6,235 | 11.5 | +11.5 |
| Total formal votes | | 53,999 | 98.5 | |
| Informal votes | | 849 | 1.5 | |
| Turnout | | 54,848 | 96.2 | |
Two-party-preferred result
| Labor | Frank Forde | | 56.2 | −4.1 |
| Country | Edwin Hiskens | | 44.8 | +45.8 |
| Labor hold | | Swing | −4.1 | |

=== Darling Downs ===
1937 Australian federal election: Darling Downs
| Party | Candidate | Votes | % | ±% |
|---|---|---|---|---|
| Country | Arthur Fadden | 30,747 | 60.7 | +60.7 |
| Labor | Leslie Bailey | 17,264 | 34.1 | −5.1 |
| Social Credit | Arthur Rushton | 2,617 | 5.2 | +5.2 |
| Total formal votes | | 50,628 | 98.5 | |
| Informal votes | | 784 | 1.5 | |
| Turnout | | 51,412 | 97.7 | |
Two-party-preferred result
| Country | Arthur Fadden | | 63.3 | −2.5 |
| Labor | Leslie Bailey | | 36.7 | +2.5 |
| Country hold | | Swing | −2.5 | |

=== Griffith ===
1937 Australian federal election: Griffith
| Party | Candidate | Votes | % | ±% |
|---|---|---|---|---|
| Labor | Francis Baker | 27,864 | 48.3 | −5.1 |
| United Australia | Dugald Clark | 23,756 | 41.2 | +6.1 |
| Social Credit | William Moore | 6,108 | 10.6 | −0.9 |
| Total formal votes | | 57,728 | 97.2 | |
| Informal votes | | 1,681 | 2.8 | |
| Turnout | | 59,409 | 97.4 | |
Two-party-preferred result
| Labor | Francis Baker | 29,026 | 50.3 | −8.9 |
| United Australia | Dugald Clark | 28,702 | 49.7 | +8.9 |
| Labor hold | | Swing | −8.9 | |

=== Herbert ===
1937 Australian federal election: Herbert
| Party | Candidate | Votes | % | ±% |
|---|---|---|---|---|
| Labor | George Martens | 25,766 | 43.6 | −8.7 |
| Country | James Wilkie | 17,252 | 29.2 | +29.2 |
| Communist | Fred Paterson | 12,523 | 21.2 | +12.9 |
| Social Credit | Henry Beck | 3,622 | 6.1 | +6.1 |
| Total formal votes | | 59,163 | 95.1 | |
| Informal votes | | 3,019 | 4.9 | |
| Turnout | | 62,182 | 94.4 | |
Two-party-preferred result
| Labor | George Martens | 39,263 | 66.4 | +5.4 |
| Country | James Wilkie | 19,900 | 33.6 | +33.6 |
| Labor hold | | Swing | +5.4 | |

=== Kennedy ===
1937 Australian federal election: Kennedy
| Party | Candidate | Votes | % | ±% |
|---|---|---|---|---|
| Labor | Bill Riordan | 30,356 | 64.0 | +4.3 |
| Country | Alex Kippen | 14,812 | 31.2 | +31.2 |
| Social Credit | Herbert Price | 2,269 | 4.8 | +4.8 |
| Total formal votes | | 47,437 | 97.0 | |
| Informal votes | | 1,443 | 3.0 | |
| Turnout | | 48,880 | 91.3 | |
Two-party-preferred result
| Labor | Bill Riordan | | 66.4 | +2.5 |
| Country | Alex Kippen | | 33.6 | −2.5 |
| Labor hold | | Swing | +2.5 | |

=== Lilley ===
1937 Australian federal election: Lilley
| Party | Candidate | Votes | % | ±% |
|---|---|---|---|---|
| United Australia | William Jolly | 31,814 | 56.6 | +5.2 |
| Labor | Edmund Taylor | 21,386 | 38.0 | −1.9 |
| Social Credit | Harry Cash | 3,040 | 5.4 | +5.4 |
| Total formal votes | | 56,240 | 97.0 | |
| Informal votes | | 1,720 | 3.0 | |
| Turnout | | 57,960 | 97.3 | |
Two-party-preferred result
| United Australia | William Jolly | | 60.3 | +4.5 |
| Labor | Edmund Taylor | | 39.7 | −4.5 |
| United Australia hold | | Swing | +4.5 | |

=== Maranoa ===
1937 Australian federal election: Maranoa
| Party | Candidate | Votes | % | ±% |
|---|---|---|---|---|
| Country | James Hunter | 24,846 | 48.4 | −3.4 |
| Labor | Randolph Bedford | 21,272 | 41.4 | +0.5 |
| Social Credit | Henry Madden | 5,257 | 10.2 | +2.9 |
| Total formal votes | | 51,375 | 98.2 | |
| Informal votes | | 963 | 1.8 | |
| Turnout | | 52,338 | 93.3 | |
Two-party-preferred result
| Country | James Hunter | 27,914 | 54.3 | −5.7 |
| Labor | Randolph Bedford | 23,461 | 45.7 | +5.7 |
| Country hold | | Swing | −5.7 | |

=== Moreton ===
1937 Australian federal election: Moreton
| Party | Candidate | Votes | % | ±% |
|---|---|---|---|---|
| United Australia | Josiah Francis | 32,813 | 55.3 | +4.1 |
| Labor | John McCoy | 22,021 | 37.1 | −1.1 |
| Social Credit | Henry Hogg | 4,508 | 7.6 | −3.0 |
| Total formal votes | | 59,342 | 97.8 | |
| Informal votes | | 1,335 | 2.2 | |
| Turnout | | 60,677 | 97.7 | |
Two-party-preferred result
| United Australia | Josiah Francis | | 59.1 | +2.6 |
| Labor | John McCoy | | 40.9 | −2.6 |
| United Australia hold | | Swing | +2.6 | |

=== Wide Bay ===
1937 Australian federal election: Wide Bay
| Party | Candidate | Votes | % | ±% |
|---|---|---|---|---|
| Social Credit | Geoffrey Nichols | 20,356 | 39.6 | +27.9 |
| Country | Bernard Corser | 19,437 | 37.8 | −15.9 |
| Labor | George Watson | 11,644 | 22.6 | −9.8 |
| Total formal votes | | 51,437 | 98.2 | |
| Informal votes | | 942 | 1.8 | |
| Turnout | | 52,379 | 95.5 | |
Two-party-preferred result
| Country | Bernard Corser | 25,991 | 50.5 | −9.3 |
| Social Credit | Geoffrey Nichols | 25,446 | 49.5 | +49.5 |
| Country hold | | Swing | −9.3 | |

== South Australia ==
=== Adelaide ===
1937 Australian federal election: Adelaide
| Party | Candidate | Votes | % | ±% |
|---|---|---|---|---|
| United Australia | Fred Stacey | 26,575 | 45.3 | +8.5 |
| Labor | Ken Bardolph | 16,989 | 28.9 | +17.8 |
| Labor | George Edwin Yates | 9,683 | 16.5 | +16.5 |
| Labor | Herbert George | 5,451 | 9.3 | +9.3 |
| Total formal votes | | 58,698 | 93.3 | |
| Informal votes | | 4,196 | 6.7 | |
| Turnout | | 62,894 | 96.5 | |
Two-party-preferred result
| United Australia | Fred Stacey | 31,721 | 54.0 | +0.8 |
| Labor | Ken Bardolph | 26,977 | 46.0 | −0.8 |
| United Australia hold | | Swing | +0.8 | |

=== Barker ===
1937 Australian federal election: Barker
| Party | Candidate | Votes | % | ±% |
|---|---|---|---|---|
| Country | Archie Cameron | 35,559 | 63.6 | +1.3 |
| Independent | Charles Lloyd | 20,375 | 36.4 | +36.4 |
| Total formal votes | | 55,934 | 95.4 | |
| Informal votes | | 2,724 | 4.6 | |
| Turnout | | 58,658 | 96.9 | |
| Country hold | | Swing | −5.1 | |

=== Boothby ===
1937 Australian federal election: Boothby
| Party | Candidate | Votes | % | ±% |
|---|---|---|---|---|
| United Australia | John Price | 31,362 | 51.9 | −9.1 |
| Labor | Kevin McEntee | 12,077 | 20.0 | +7.1 |
| Independent | William Hardy | 9,136 | 15.1 | +15.1 |
| Labor | Leonard Pilton | 7,859 | 13.0 | +13.0 |
| Total formal votes | | 60,434 | 94.0 | |
| Informal votes | | 3,831 | 6.0 | |
| Turnout | | 64,265 | 96.4 | |
Two-party-preferred result
| United Australia | John Price | | 59.8 | −5.9 |
| Labor | Kevin McEntee | | 40.2 | +5.9 |
| United Australia hold | | Swing | −5.9 | |

=== Grey ===
1937 Australian federal election: Grey
| Party | Candidate | Votes | % | ±% |
|---|---|---|---|---|
| Country | Oliver Badman | 24,153 | 52.0 | +52.0 |
| Labor | James Marner | 17,528 | 37.8 | +3.6 |
| Independent | Alfred Parker | 4,736 | 10.2 | +10.2 |
| Total formal votes | | 46,417 | 95.8 | |
| Informal votes | | 2,029 | 4.2 | |
| Turnout | | 48,446 | 97.2 | |
Two-party-preferred result
| Country | Oliver Badman | | 57.1 | +57.1 |
| Labor | James Marner | | 42.9 | +2.9 |
| Country gain from United Australia | | Swing | −2.9 | |

=== Hindmarsh ===
1937 Australian federal election: Hindmarsh
| Party | Candidate | Votes | % | ±% |
|---|---|---|---|---|
| Labor | Norman Makin | 43,215 | 70.7 | +8.8 |
| United Australia | Harry Hatwell | 17,918 | 29.3 | +29.3 |
| Total formal votes | | 61,133 | 95.8 | |
| Informal votes | | 2,662 | 4.2 | |
| Turnout | | 63,795 | 97.1 | |
| Labor hold | | Swing | +4.0 | |

=== Wakefield ===
1937 Australian federal election: Wakefield
| Party | Candidate | Votes | % | ±% |
|---|---|---|---|---|
| United Australia | Charles Hawker | 32,113 | 63.4 | −1.7 |
| Labor | Raymond Davis | 18,508 | 36.6 | +17.4 |
| Total formal votes | | 50,621 | 96.1 | |
| Informal votes | | 2,073 | 3.9 | |
| Turnout | | 52,694 | 96.5 | |
| United Australia hold | | Swing | −10.6 | |

== Western Australia ==
=== Forrest ===
1937 Australian federal election: Forrest
| Party | Candidate | Votes | % | ±% |
|---|---|---|---|---|
| Country | John Prowse | 22,894 | 54.4 | −5.7 |
| Labor | Ernest Hoar | 19,153 | 45.6 | +17.0 |
| Total formal votes | | 42,047 | 96.7 | |
| Informal votes | | 1,430 | 3.3 | |
| Turnout | | 43,477 | 94.2 | |
| Country hold | | Swing | −9.4 | |

=== Fremantle ===
1937 Australian federal election: Fremantle
| Party | Candidate | Votes | % | ±% |
|---|---|---|---|---|
| Labor | John Curtin | 29,548 | 55.2 | +9.5 |
| United Australia | Eric Isaachsen | 21,857 | 40.9 | +0.5 |
| Independent | Henry Wright | 2,081 | 3.9 | +3.9 |
| Total formal votes | | 53,486 | 96.7 | |
| Informal votes | | 1,827 | 3.3 | |
| Turnout | | 55,313 | 94.7 | |
Two-party-preferred result
| Labor | John Curtin | | 57.2 | +4.6 |
| United Australia | Eric Isaachsen | | 42.8 | −4.6 |
| Labor hold | | Swing | +4.6 | |

=== Kalgoorlie ===
1937 Australian federal election: Kalgoorlie
| Party | Candidate | Votes | % | ±% |
|---|---|---|---|---|
| Labor | Albert Green | 25,771 | 73.6 | −26.4 |
| United Australia | Stephen Kellow | 9,235 | 26.4 | +26.4 |
| Total formal votes | | 35,006 | 96.0 | |
| Informal votes | | 1,457 | 4.0 | |
| Turnout | | 36,463 | 88.4 | |
| Labor hold | | Swing | −26.4 | |

=== Perth ===
1937 Australian federal election: Perth
| Party | Candidate | Votes | % | ±% |
|---|---|---|---|---|
| United Australia | Walter Nairn | 21,800 | 41.1 | +22.6 |
| Labor | Tom Burke | 18,091 | 34.1 | +0.1 |
| United Australia | Jack Simons | 10,035 | 18.9 | +18.9 |
| Independent | Viv James | 3,085 | 5.8 | +5.8 |
| Total formal votes | | 53,011 | 96.4 | |
| Informal votes | | 1,980 | 3.6 | |
| Turnout | | 54,991 | 93.6 | |
Two-party-preferred result
| United Australia | Walter Nairn | 31,942 | 60.3 | +2.9 |
| Labor | Tom Burke | 21,069 | 39.7 | −2.9 |
| United Australia hold | | Swing | +2.9 | |

=== Swan ===
1937 Australian federal election: Swan
| Party | Candidate | Votes | % | ±% |
|---|---|---|---|---|
| Country | Henry Gregory | 26,299 | 58.1 | −5.9 |
| Labor | John Steele | 18,951 | 41.9 | +5.9 |
| Total formal votes | | 45,250 | 96.5 | |
| Informal votes | | 1,623 | 3.5 | |
| Turnout | | 46,873 | 92.5 | |
| Country hold | | Swing | −5.9 | |

== Tasmania ==
=== Bass ===
1937 Australian federal election: Bass
| Party | Candidate | Votes | % | ±% |
|---|---|---|---|---|
| Labor | Claude Barnard | 12,583 | 50.4 | +22.8 |
| United Australia | Allan Guy | 9,760 | 39.1 | −2.4 |
| Independent | John Watson | 2,621 | 10.5 | −0.5 |
| Total formal votes | | 24,964 | 97.6 | |
| Informal votes | | 612 | 2.4 | |
| Turnout | | 25,576 | 96.5 | |
Two-party-preferred result
| Labor | Claude Barnard | | 55.7 | +5.4 |
| United Australia | Allan Guy | | 44.3 | −5.4 |
| Labor hold | | Swing | +5.4 | |

=== Darwin ===
1937 Australian federal election: Darwin
| Party | Candidate | Votes | % | ±% |
|---|---|---|---|---|
| United Australia | George Bell | 13,557 | 52.5 | −1.9 |
| Labor | Edwin Brown | 12,270 | 47.5 | +1.9 |
| Total formal votes | | 25,827 | 97.9 | |
| Informal votes | | 559 | 2.1 | |
| Turnout | | 26,386 | 95.8 | |
| United Australia hold | | Swing | −1.9 | |

=== Denison ===
1937 Australian federal election: Denison
| Party | Candidate | Votes | % | ±% |
|---|---|---|---|---|
| Labor | Gerald Mahoney | 11,652 | 47.5 | −1.7 |
| United Australia | John McPhee | 10,123 | 41.3 | −0.7 |
| Independent Labor | Maxwell Hickman | 2,159 | 8.8 | +8.8 |
| Social Credit | Athol Smith | 600 | 2.4 | −6.3 |
| Total formal votes | | 24,534 | 96.8 | |
| Informal votes | | 1,067 | 4.2 | |
| Turnout | | 25,601 | 96.3 | |
Two-party-preferred result
| Labor | Gerald Mahoney | 13,218 | 53.9 | +3.6 |
| United Australia | John McPhee | 11,316 | 46.1 | −3.6 |
| Labor hold | | Swing | +3.6 | |

=== Franklin ===
1937 Australian federal election: Franklin
| Party | Candidate | Votes | % | ±% |
|---|---|---|---|---|
| Labor | Charles Frost | 15,348 | 58.0 | +14.9 |
| United Australia | Hugh Warner | 11,133 | 42.0 | +2.2 |
| Total formal votes | | 26,481 | 97.8 | |
| Informal votes | | 599 | 2.2 | |
| Turnout | | 27,080 | 97.0 | |
| Labor hold | | Swing | +5.6 | |

=== Wilmot ===
1937 Australian federal election: Wilmot
| Party | Candidate | Votes | % | ±% |
|---|---|---|---|---|
| United Australia | Joseph Lyons | 12,365 | 53.2 | −4.3 |
| Labor | Lancelot Spurr | 6,384 | 27.4 | +27.4 |
| Labor | Maurice Weston | 4,511 | 19.4 | +19.4 |
| Total formal votes | | 23,260 | 96.8 | |
| Informal votes | | 776 | 3.2 | |
| Turnout | | 24,036 | 94.3 | |
Two-party-preferred result
| United Australia | Joseph Lyons | | 55.1 | −4.3 |
| Labor | Lancelot Spurr | | 44.9 | +4.3 |
| United Australia hold | | Swing | −4.3 | |

== Northern Territory ==
=== Northern Territory ===
1937 Australian federal election: Northern Territory
| Party | Candidate | Votes | % | ±% |
|---|---|---|---|---|
| Independent | Adair Blain | 963 | 38.2 | −11.6 |
| Labor | Robert Toupein | 920 | 36.5 | −9.2 |
| Independent | Ronald Hughes-Jones | 333 | 13.2 | +13.2 |
| Independent | Harold Nelson | 305 | 12.1 | +12.1 |
| Total formal votes | | 2,521 | 98.8 | |
| Informal votes | | 32 | 1.2 | |
| Turnout | | 2,553 | 80.1 | |
Two-party-preferred result
| Independent | Adair Blain | 1,310 | 52.0 | +0.2 |
| Labor | Robert Toupein | 1,211 | 48.0 | −0.2 |
| Independent hold | | Swing | +0.2 | |

== See also ==
- Candidates of the 1937 Australian federal election
- Members of the Australian House of Representatives, 1937–1940
