= Alexander Ward (barrister) =

Australian lawyer and naval officer (born 1963)

Alexander Ward AM
- Ward in 2026

President of the Commonwealth Lawyers Association
- In office April 2015 – 2017
- Vice President: Santhaan Krishnan
- Preceded by: Mark Stephens
- Succeeded by: R. Santhanakrishnan

President of the Law Council of Australia
- In office January 2011 – 1 January 2012
- Preceded by: Glenn Ferguson
- Succeeded by: Catherine Gale

President of the Law Society of South Australia
- In office 2004–2005
- Preceded by: David Howard
- Succeeded by: Dymphna Eszenyi

Personal details
- Born: Alexander James Ward; 29 May 1963 (age 63)
- Spouse: Amanda Ward (m. 1989)
- Children: 3
- Education: Saint Ignatius' College; University of Adelaide (LLB); South Australian Institute of Technology
- Occupation: Barrister

Military service
- Allegiance: Australia
- Branch/service: Royal Australian Naval Reserve
- Years of service: 1999–present
- Rank: Commander

Alexander James Ward (born 29 May 1963) is an Australian barrister and naval reserve legal officer. He served as president of the Law Society of South Australia from 2004 to 2005, the Law Council of Australia in 2011 and the Commonwealth Lawyers Association from 2015 to 2017.

Ward studied at Saint Ignatius' College in Adelaide. He received a Bachelor of Laws degree from the University of Adelaide in 1984. In 1985 he was conferred a Graduate Diploma of Legal Practice at the South Australian Institute of Technology and he was admitted to the bar in 1985. Before joining Ward & Ward with his wife in 1993, he had worked for Ward & Partners.

He practiced as a partner in Norman Waterhouse Lawyers from 2001 to 2002. Ward started practice as a barrister in Edmund Barton Chambers in Adelaide. His area of practice included civil litigation, insurance law, military and workers' compensation. Ward was appointed as a legal officer in the Royal Australian Naval Reserve in 1999.

Ward was made a part-time member of the Administrative Appeals Tribunal in 2017 and was made a senior member in 2024. Apart from his practice of law, Ward has also had experience in writing, performing, and broadcasting comedy. On the 2024 King's Birthday Honours, Ward was made a Member of the Order of Australia for his outstanding service to law and the arts.

== Early life and education ==
Alexander James Ward was born on 29 May 1963 and was the tenth out of twelve siblings born to Kevin James and Joan, raised from a Catholic family with Irish ancestry. Ward is a lawyer of the third generation as his grandfather, also named Kevin Leonard Ward, was a Queen's Council practicing law at Berri, South Australia. His father was admitted to the South Australian Bar on 20 December 1948 and started Ward & Partners at Adelaide. His grandfather had appeared for Frederick Alexander James, who was a fruit producer, in a case of constitutional litigation related to trade barriers.

Ward went to Saint Ignatius' College, Adelaide between 1971 and 1980. He then applied for the Royal Military College, Duntroon, but was chosen for officer cadet training in Portsea. Between 1981 and 1984, Ward pursued his studies at the University of Adelaide, completing a degree in Bachelor of Laws. He later joined the Adelaide University Regiment of the Australian Army Reserve from 1981 to 1982 and became a member of the pipes and drums of the Royal Caledonian Society of South Australia between 1982 and 1990.

During his time at the university, he met Shaun Micallef who was also a law student, and took part in sketch comedy shows with the Adelaide University Footlights Club. Ward has also been a co-presenter of a radio show called The Comedy Crystal Set.

== Legal career ==
=== Early career (1985–2003) ===
Ward was admitted to the Supreme Court of South Australia and High Court of Australia in 1985. Following the failure to obtain a job in a country firm, he joined his father's firm Ward & Partners from 1985 to 1993. Throughout the 1980s, he was a part of the Get Her Theatre Sports group which included Micallef, Francis Greenslade, and Anthony Durkin, and belonged to the Marat Pack. His other theatrical performances were with the Adelaide University Theatre Guild. Ward appeared on ABC Television's Theatre Sports in 1987. In 1993, Ward founded Ward & Ward in partnership with his wife, serving as a partner till 2001.

Ward was commissioned as an officer in the Royal Australian Naval Reserve on 5 March 1999. He underwent training for the Reserves Entry Officer Course, survival at sea and sea service on HMAS Brisbane (D 41). Serving as a reserve legal officer, he undertook temporary relief legal services to HMAS Kuttabul, RAAF Tindal and Fleet Legal Office. The tasks involved providing advice to the Office of the Director of Military Prosecutions and conducting inquiry. Ward served as a representative for a potentially affected person during the HMAS Success (OR 304) inquiry.

Prior to entering his career as a barrister at Edmund Barton Chambers, Adelaide between 2002 and 2003, Ward was a partner at Norman Waterhouse Lawyers between 2001 and 2002. Some of his practice areas include civil litigation, insurance law, catastrophic injury cases, fraud, commercial litigation, workers' compensation and military law.

=== Professional leadership (2004–2017) ===
Between 2004 and 2005, Ward was the president of the Law Society of South Australia. During his tenure as president, he was involved in deliberations on the issues of petrol sniffing, civil liability of charity food donations, and amendments to the Civil Liability Act in South Australia. He was also part of public forums and spoke to law students at schools. In 2004, he started making appearances as a legal commentator at ABC Radio Adelaide.

Ward with the City of Adelaide Pipe Band at the Anzac Day dawn service at the National War Memorial in 2026

From 2009 to 2017, Ward was on the council of the Commonwealth Lawyers Association. On Anzac Day in 2010, he led a combined guard from Naval Headquarters South Australia, Joint Electronic Warfare Operational Support Unit and HMAS Arunta (FFH 151).

Ward assumed the presidency of the Law Council of Australia in January 2011. Some of his concerns were how to retain young lawyers in metropolitan and rural communities and how to increase the number of women in senior positions.

In that month, Ward showed his support for the independence of the Director of Military Prosecutions Lyn McDade, after she decided to prosecute three special forces soldiers from Australia who were accused of killing civilians in an operation carried out in Afghanistan in 2009. He did not want political interference in the prosecution process.

At a Law Council Forum on 31 January 2011, Ward suggested legal education for Indigenous children in schools and access to law programs in universities via TAFE Colleges in rural regions. As part of his term of office, the Law Council adopted Reconciliation Action Plan and the RRR Law Program that promoted legal profession in rural and regional Australia.

During that period, Ward carried out a scoping study relating to the creation of a legal disciplinary process in Solomon Islands and delivered a speech at the constitutional forum of Law Council regarding Indigenous recognition. Furthermore, he made a speech at the Law Society of Ireland in Dublin regarding the shortage of lawyers in rural and regional Australia, which encouraged solicitors in Ireland to practise in Australia. He made efforts to establish more links between overseas lawyers who practise in Australia and the Australian legal profession when visiting Thailand, London, and Ireland. Catherine Gale took the office of Law Council president on 1 January 2012.

Since 2012, Ward joined in the project of Commonwealth Lawyers Association (CLA) relating to the examination of the application of blasphemy laws in Malta, Malaysia, Nigeria, Pakistan, and Australia. In 2013, he was appointed vice-president of the association for two years under president Mark Stephens. He was also hosting the FIVEaa breakfast programme in 2012–2013, 2013–2014, and 2014–2015.

In April 2015, Ward replaced Stephens to become the president of the CLA during the 19th Commonwealth Law Conference in Glasgow. He worked in the capacity until 2017 and continued to be a member of the executive board of the association after that year.

=== Tribunal appointments and other roles (2017–present) ===
In 2017, Ward became a part-time member of the General Division of the Administrative Appeals Tribunal (AAT). In an interview from 2020, he noted that his tribunal cases were typically handled in Adelaide Registry while working in civil litigation at Edmund Barton Chambers. In June 2024, he was appointed once more as a senior member of the tribunal, being one of 72 reappointed members in anticipation of the formation of the AAT. He worked as a sessional senior member of the AAT thereafter.

Among other professions he has undertaken include serving on various Law Council committees dealing with legal education, corporate governance and audit and risk management, and co-chairing its Rural Retention and Recruitment Committee. Among others, he has also been on the Law Society of South Australia's Ethics and Practice Committee and Lawyers Support Group, the Adelaide Fringe board, and various Australian Defence Force (ADF) ethics committees. Among his duties in relation to his military legal practice include conducting sensitive investigations as Assistant Inspector-General of the ADF.

== Honours and awards ==
Ward was honoured with the Sir Laurence Street Award for Navy Legal Officers in 2014. In the 2024 King's Birthday Honours, he was awarded the Member of the Order of Australia (AM) for his service in the legal profession and the arts.

== Personal life ==
Ward married Amanda on 2 April 1989, and they have three children namely Nicholas, Xanthe, and India. His hobbies include military and classical history and bushwalking.
