= 1937 Australian federal election =

- 23 October 1937

All 75 (Note: The Northern Territory had one seat, but members for the territories did not have full voting rights until 1966 and did not count toward government formation.) seats of the House of Representatives 38 seats were needed for a majority in the House 19 (of the 36) seats of the Senate
- Registered: 4,080,038 ▲4.54%
- Turnout: 3,699,269 (96.13%) (Note: Turnout in contested seats) (▲0.96 pp)
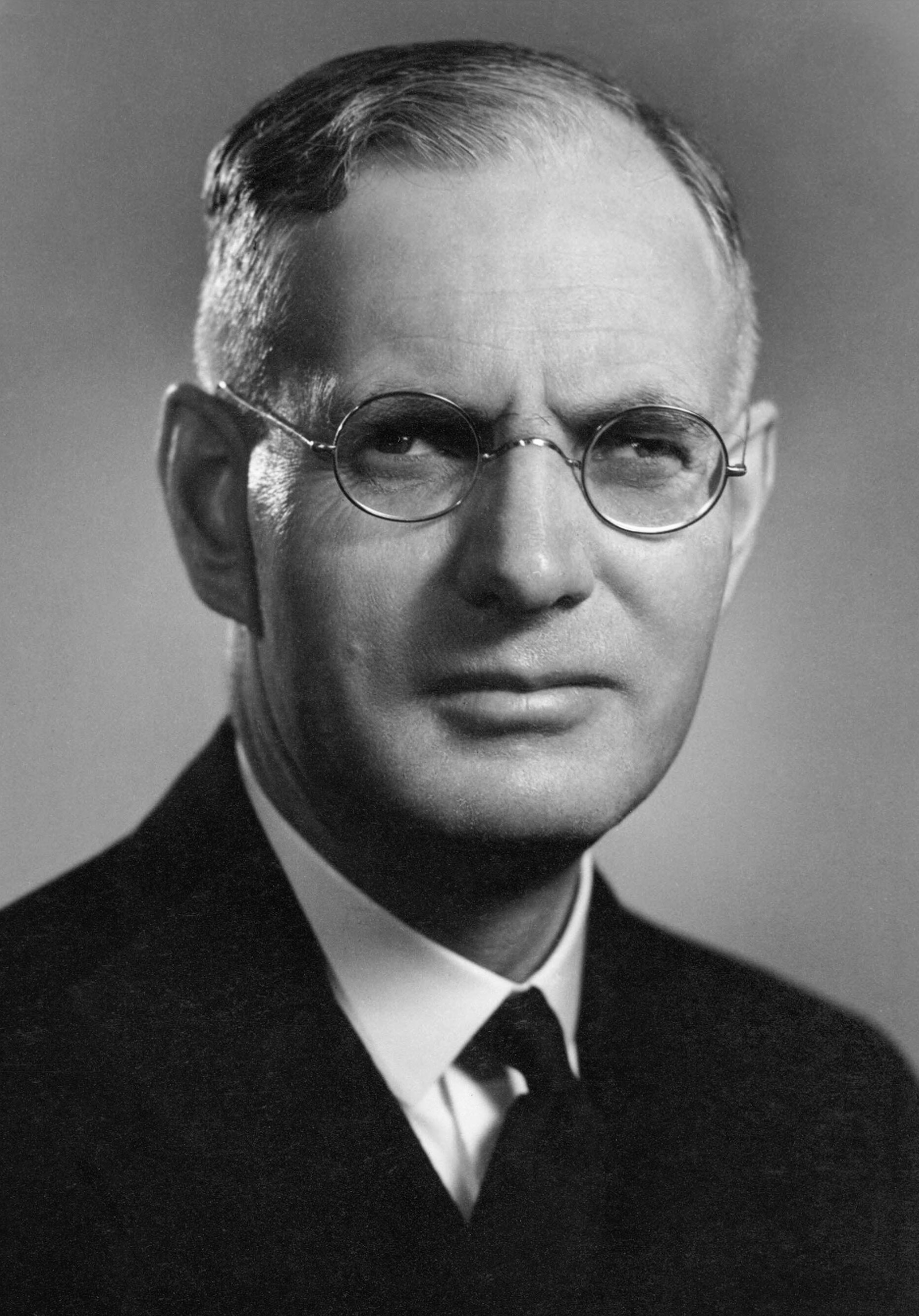

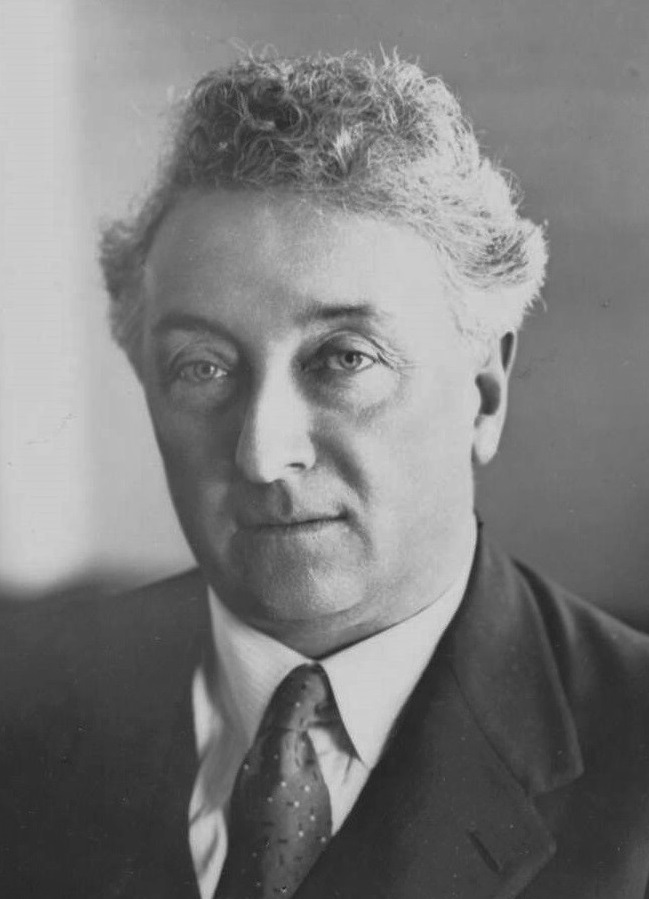

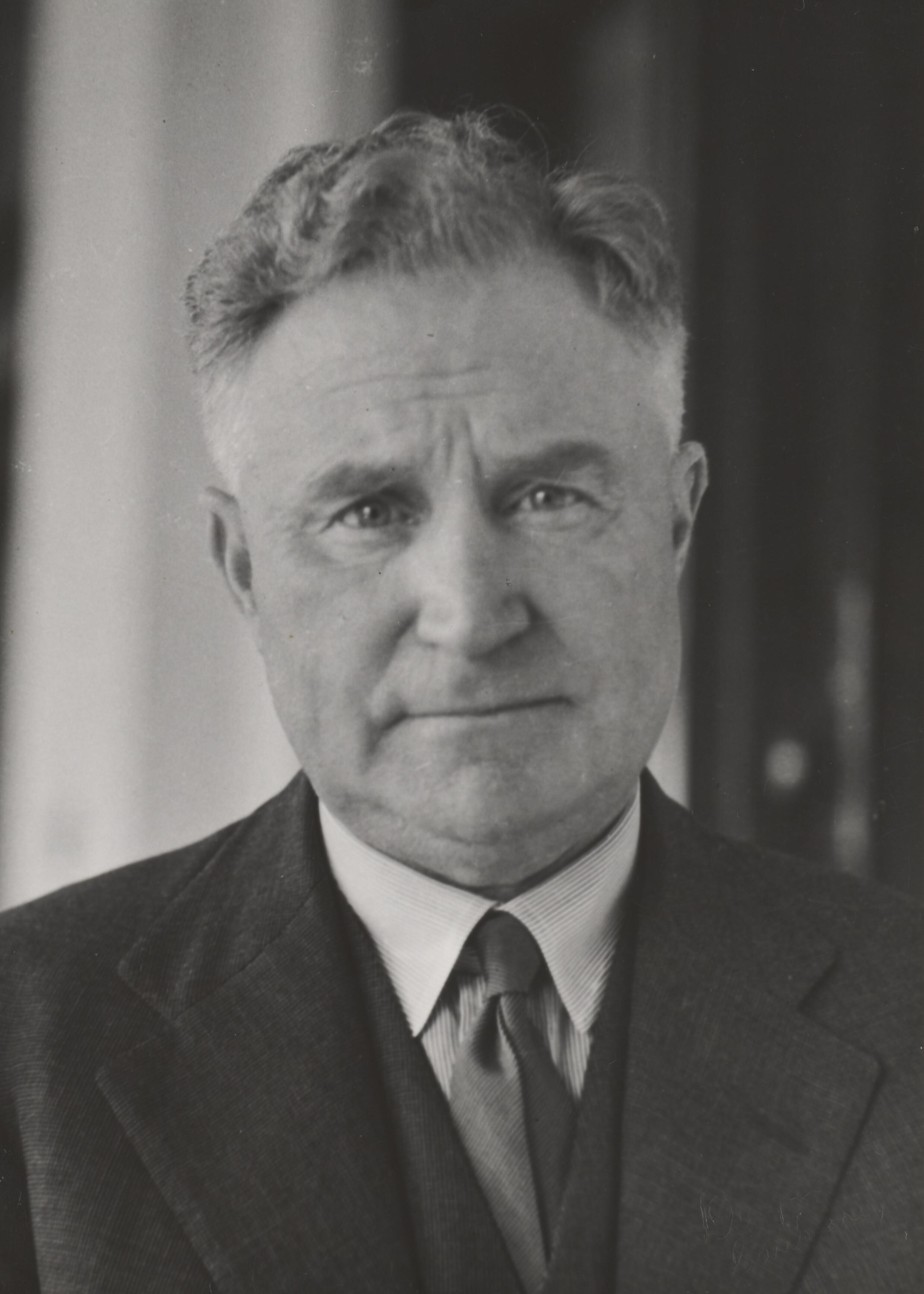
	First party	Second party	Third party
Leader	John Curtin	Joseph Lyons	Earle Page
Party	Labor	United Australia	Country
Leader since	1 October 1935	7 May 1931	5 April 1921
Leader's seat	Fremantle (WA)	Wilmot (Tas.)	Cowper (NSW)
Last election	18 seats	28 seats	14 seats
Seats won	29	28	15
Seat change	▲11	0	▲1
Primary vote	1,555,737	1,214,526	560,279
Percentage	43.17%	33.71%	15.55%
Swing	▲16.36	▲0.73	▲2.93
- Results by division for the House of Representatives, shaded by winning party's margin of victory.
Prime Minister before election
Joseph Lyons
UAP/Country coalition
Subsequent Prime Minister
Joseph Lyons
UAP/Country coalition

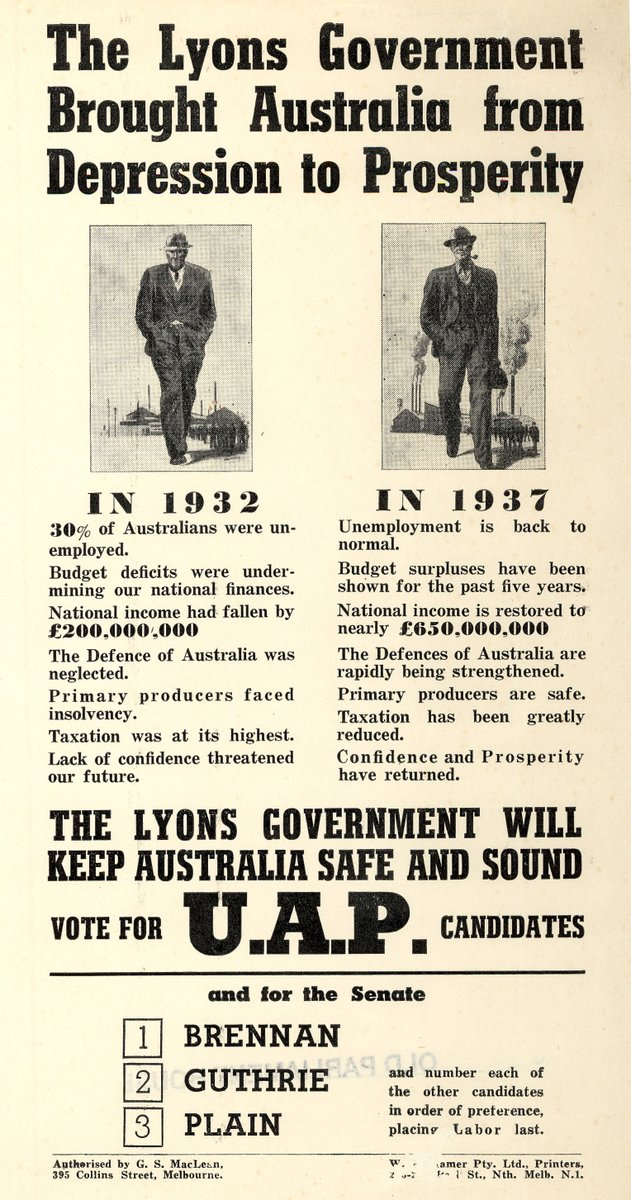
Poster promoting the return of the Lyons Government at the 1937 federal election; Lyons became the first Australian prime minister to win three elections.

A federal election was held in Australia on 23 October 1937. All 74 seats in the House of Representatives, and 19 of the 36 seats in the Senate were up for election. The incumbent UAP–Country coalition government, led by Prime Minister Joseph Lyons, defeated the opposition Labor Party under John Curtin.

The election is notable in that the Country Party achieved its highest-ever primary (first preference) vote in the lower house, thereby winning nearly a quarter of all lower-house seats. At the 1934 election nine seats in New South Wales had been won by Lang Labor. Following the reunion of the two Labor parties in February 1936, these were held by their members as ALP seats at the 1937 election. With the party's wins in Ballaarat and Gwydir (initially at a by-election on 8 March 1937), the ALP had a net gain of 11 seats compared with the previous election.

This was the first election contested by future prime minister Harold Holt as a member of parliament, having been elected two years prior in the 1935 Fawkner by-election.

== Background ==
The UAP and Country Party formed a new coalition a few months after the 1934 election, after the UAP initially attempted to govern in minority. The coalition proved stable throughout the parliamentary term, with Country Party leader Earle Page becoming de facto deputy prime minister.

James Scullin retired as leader of the Labor Party in October 1935. John Curtin unexpectedly won the resulting leadership election over Frank Forde, becoming the first Western Australian to lead a major party. In February 1936 the Lang Labor MPs re-joined the parliamentary ALP caucus for the first time since the 1931 party split, in line with the federal conference's decision to readmit the New South Wales branch.

== Campaign ==
Although Australia was not at war, the 1937 election has been described as a khaki election as the primary issue during the campaign was defence policy.

Both major party leaders launched their campaigns at smaller venues within their electorates. Curtin gave his policy address on 20 September in Fremantle, Western Australia, while Lyons followed on 28 September in Deloraine, Tasmania. This was the first time Lyons had launched the UAP campaign in his home state, with the party's 1931 and 1934 campaigns launched at the Sydney Town Hall.

== Results ==
The governing coalition won 43 out of 75 seats in the House of Representatives, with Lyons becoming the first Australian prime minister to win three consecutive federal elections. The position in the House was largely unchanged from the 1934 election, with Labor winning only a single seat (Bendigo) from the UAP. The Country Party won two rural seats from the UAP, although in Grey this was a result of an agreement within South Australia's Liberal and Country League to allow Country Party senator Oliver Badman and UAP MP Philip McBride to swap chambers.

Two senior cabinet ministers were unexpectedly defeated at the election. External affairs minister George Pearce lost his Senate seat in Western Australia following a targeted campaign which criticised his earlier opposition to the secession movement. The pro-secession Sunday Times ran an anti-Pearce editorial line, while the Dominion League of Western Australia and the Wheat Growers' Union ran a "Put Pearce Last" campaign. Defence minister Archdale Parkhill was defeated in Warringah by Percy Spender, an "independent UAP" candidate who campaigned on defence preparedness and "the need for youth in government".

=== House of Representatives ===
Labor: 29 seats United Australia: 28 seats Country: 15 seats Independent: 2 seats

House of Reps (IRV) — 1937–40—Turnout 96.13% (CV) — Informal 2.59%
Party	First preference votes	%	Swing	Seats	Change
UAP–Country coalition	1,774,805	49.26	–1.01	43	–4
United Australia	1,214,526	33.71	+0.73	28	0
Country	560,279	15.55	+2.93	15	+1
Labor	1,555,737	43.17	+16.36	29	+11
Social Credit	79,432	2.20	−2.49	0	0
Communist	17,153	0.48	+0.48	0	0
Independents	176,214	4.89	+2.38	3 (Note: Including Northern Territory)	+2
Total	3,603,223			75	
Two-party-preferred (estimated)
UAP–Country coalition	Win	50.60	−2.90	43	+1
Labor		49.40	+2.90	29	+11

Notes

- Four members were elected unopposed, all from the Labor Party.
- Independents: Alexander Wilson (Wimmera, Vic) and Percy Spender (Warringah, NSW).
- The member for Northern Territory, Adair Blain (independent), had voting rights only for issues relating to the Territory, and so is not included in the table.

First preference vote
Labor	43.17%
United Australia	33.17%
Country	15.55%
Independent	5.56%
Social Credit	2.20%
Communist	0.48%

Two-party-preferred vote
Coalition	50.60%
Labor	49.40%

Parliament seats
Coalition	58.11%
Labor	38.19%
Independent	2.70%

=== Senate ===
Senate (P BV) — 1937–40—Turnout 94.75% (CV) — Informal 9.56%
Party	First preference votes	%	Swing	Seats won	Seats held	Change
Labor	1,699,172	48.48	+20.40	16	16	+13
UAP–Country coalition	1,636,889	46.71	–6.51	3	20	–13
UAP–Country joint ticket	1,005,247	28.68	+10.44	0	N/A	N/A
United Australia	565,161	16.13	−4.54	3	16	−10
Country	66,481	1.90	−12.41	0	4	−3
Social Credit	49,801	1.42	−1.36	0	0	0
Independent	118,768	3.39	+2.93	0	0	0
Total	3,504,630			19	36	

== Seats changing hands ==
Seat	Pre-1937			Swing	Post-1937		
Seat	Party	Member	Margin	Swing	Margin	Member	Party
Ballaarat, Vic	United Australia	Archibald Fisken	3.9	3.5	0.6	Reg Pollard	Labor
Bendigo, Vic	United Australia	Eric Harrison	N/A	0.3	6.9	George Rankin	Country
Grey, SA	United Australia	Philip McBride	N/A	2.9	7.1	Oliver Badman	Country
Warringah, NSW	United Australia	Archdale Parkhill	N/A	29.4	1.9	Percy Spender	Independent UAP
Wimmera, Vic	Country	Hugh McClelland	N/A	2.9	1.9	Alexander Wilson	Independent

- Members listed in italics did not contest their seat at this election.

== See also ==
- Candidates of the 1937 Australian federal election
- Members of the Australian House of Representatives, 1937–1940
- Members of the Australian Senate, 1938–1941
