= Helmore =

Helmore is a surname. Notable people with the surname include:

- Basil Helmore (1897–1973), Australian businessman
- Des Helmore (born 1940), New Zealand artist
- George Helmore (1862–1922), New Zealand rugby union player
- Heathcote Helmore (1894–1965), New Zealand architect
- Thomas Helmore (1811–1890), English choirmaster
- Tom Helmore (1904–1995), English actor
- William Helmore (1894–1964), English engineer
