= Kuala Lumpur Bar =

Bar association

- Type: Bar association
- Region served: Kuala Lumpur
- Website: https://klbar.org.my

The Kuala Lumpur Bar was established on 1 July 1992 at a general meeting of advocates & solicitors practising in the Federal Territory of Kuala Lumpur held under section 68(4) of the Legal Profession Act 1976. Before that date, practitioners in Kuala Lumpur were members of the Selangor Bar, which was later called the Selangor & Federal Territory Bar on Kuala Lumpur becoming a Federal Territory in 1974.

The Kuala Lumpur Bar is led by a Committee comprising the Chairman of the KL Bar and ten other members who are elected annually at the Annual General Meeting. The committee is also empowered to co-opt two additional members into the committee. The co-opted members can participate in the deliberations of the committee but have no vote. The Chairman is an ex-officio member of the Bar Council and a representative to the Bar Council is elected by members of the Kuala Lumpur Bar at their Annual General Meeting. The Honorary Secretary is appointed by the committee from amongst the members of the Kuala Lumpur Bar but by convention will be from the elected Committee. The Kuala Lumpur Bar Committee (KLBC) currently has twelve sub-committees to undertake a host of projects and activities.

== See also ==
- Malaysian Bar
