= Malaysian Bar =

Professional body of lawyers in peninsular Malaysia

Malaysian Bar Council
- Majlis Peguam Malaysia
- The Malaysian Bar Coat of Arms

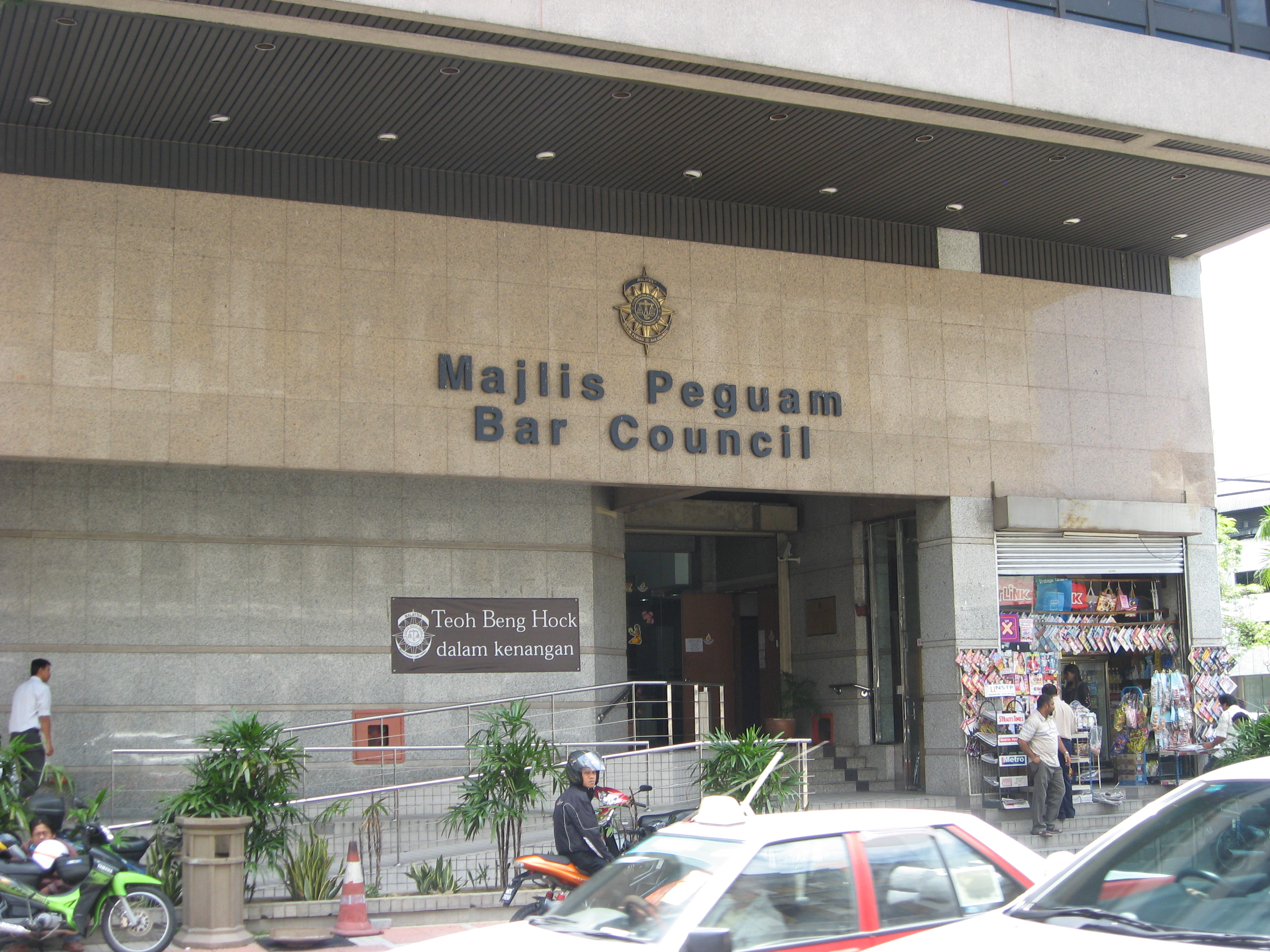
- The Council's headquarters in Kuala Lumpur.
- Predecessor: Malayan Bar
- Formation: 1947; 79 years ago
- Headquarters: No. 2, Leboh Pasar Besar, 50050 Kuala Lumpur. Tel: +603-20502050
- Location: Peninsular Malaysia
- Members: Lawyers Profession
- President: Anand Raj
- Website: www.malaysianbar.org.my

The Malaysian Bar (Malay: Badan Peguam Malaysia) is a professional body which regulates the profession of lawyers in peninsular Malaysia. In Malaysia, there is no distinction between a barrister and a solicitor, in that, it is a fused profession. Membership into the Bar is automatic and mandatory. The bar was created under the Legal Profession Act 1976. Like other bar associations around the world, it has a wide range of functions, including, to protect the reputation of the legal profession, to uphold the cause of justice, to express its views on matters relating to legislations, and others.

The management of the affairs of the Bar is undertaken by a council known as the Bar Council (Malay: Majlis Peguam). The Bar Council comprises thirty eight members who are elected annually to manage the affairs and execute the functions of the Malaysian Bar. The Council consists of the immediate past President and Vice-President of the Malaysian Bar, the Chairman of each of the twelve State Bar Committees, one member elected by each of the twelve State Bar Committees to be its representative to the Bar Council, and twelve members elected from throughout Peninsular Malaysia by way of postal ballot.

Separate bodies regulate the legal profession in the states of Sabah and Sarawak. Their bar associations are known as the Sabah Law Society and the Advocates' Association of Sarawak respectively.

The Council is headed by a president. Kindly refer Malaysian Bar website for more information regarding the current Malaysian Bar Committee and the Bar Council members.

== History of the Malaysian Bar ==
A semblance of the present day Bar Council was established vide Advocates & Solicitors Enactment 1914 (FMS No. 22/1914) covering the legal practitioners in the Federated Malay States. The first annual meeting of the Federated Malay States Bar was held at Kuala Lumpur, representatives of the profession being present from Selangor and Perak. The following Federal Bar Committee was elected, Messrs. A. N Kenion, Byrant, H.A. Hope, T. H. I. Rogers and A. P Robinson.

The 1914 Enactment was replaced by the Advocates & Solicitors Ordinance 1940. The Unfederated Malay States like Johore had their own Enactments like the Advocates & Solicitors Enactment of Johore. The Solicitors in the Straits Settlements of Malacca and Penang together with Singapore were covered by the Advocates & Solicitors Ordinance of the Straits Settlements.

After the Japanese Occupation, the Advocates & Solicitors Ordinance 1947 replaced all the statutes covering the Unfederated and Federated Malay States and the Straits Settlements of Malacca and Penang. The 1947 Ordinance can be referred to as the starting point that established the 1st Bar Council covering Malaya. It was the 1st time a self-elected and self-regulated Bar Council was established. But its role was somewhat limited to:

- representing the Bar in matters affecting the legal profession as a whole
- make rules regarding practice and etiquette of the profession
- examine and report on current legislation
- deal with admission and entry requirements into the profession
- oversee standards and discipline among members of the Bar

But the Legal Profession Act 1976 which replaced the 1947 Ordinance provided for a truly independent Bar. The Bar Council represents the Malaysian Bar at:

- the Qualifying Board which decides on the qualification for entry into the profession.
- the Disciplinary Board – all Advocates & Solicitors are subject to the control of this Board in all matters relating to discipline.
- the Solicitors Costs Committee which makes general orders regulating the remuneration of Advocates & Solicitors in respect of non-contentious business.
- the Rules Committee which is empowered to make rules regulating the procedures in court.

Singapore lawyers could freely practice in West Malaysia until its doors were closed on 31 December 1970.

== Admission to the Malaysian Bar ==
All matters pertaining to the qualifications and requirements for admission to the Bar in Malaysia are governed by the provisions under the Legal Profession Act 1976 (the Act). To be eligible for admission, a candidate must satisfy all requirements as are provided in the Act which may be broadly categorised as follows:

- academic requirements
- practical requirements
- formal requirements

As to the academic requirements, this is satisfied if a candidate can show that he/she is a 'qualified person' within the meaning of section 3 of the Act. Under the Act, 'qualified person' means any person who:

- has passed the final examination leading to the degree of Bachelor of Laws of the University of Malaya, the University of Malaya in Singapore, the University of Singapore or the National University of Singapore;
- is a barrister-at-law of England; or
- in possession of such other qualification as may by notification in the Gazette be declared by the Board to be sufficient to make a person a qualified person for the purposes of the Act.

Such person must then satisfy the practical and formal requirements before he/she may petition for admission. A pupil intending to commence his pupillage must file various documents with the High Court to qualify as an Advocate and Solicitor in Malaysia.

== List of presidents of the Malaysian Bar ==
=== Malayan Bar (1947–1963) ===
- 1947–1952: E. D. Shearn
- 1953–1960: R. Ramani
- 1960–1961: Morris Edgar
- 1961–1963: R. Ramani

=== Malaysian Bar ===
- 1963–1964: S. M. Yong
- 1964–1973: R. R. Chelliah
- 1973–1974: Chan Hua Eng
- 1974–1976: V. C. George
- 1976–1978: Raja Aziz Addruse
- 1978–1980: Abdullah A. Rahman
- 1980–1982: G. T. S. Sidhu
- 1982–1984: S. Sivasubaramaniam
- 1984–1986: Dato' Ronald Khoo Teng Swee
- 1986–1988: Param Cumaraswamy
- 1988–1989: Raja Aziz Addruse
- 1989–1991: S. Theivanthiran
- 1991–1992: Manjeet Singh Dhillon
- 1992–1993: Raja Aziz Addruse
- 1993–1995: Zainur Zakaria
- 1995–1997: Hendon Haji Abdullah
- 1997–1999: Dato' Dr Cyrus V. Das
- 1999–2000: Barrister Amirul Zaid
- 2000–2001: Datuk Sulaiman Abdullah
- 2001–2003: Mah Weng Kwai
- 2003–2005: Kuthubul Zaman Bukhari
- 2005–2007: Yeo Yang Poh
- 2007–2009: Dato’ Ambiga Sreenevasan
- 2009–2011: Ragunath Kesavan
- 2011–2013: Lim Chee Wee
- 2013–2015: Christopher Leong Sau Foo
- 2015-2017: Steven Thiru
- 2017-2019: George Varughese
- 2019-2020: Dato'Abdul Fareed Abdul Gafoor
- 2020-2021: Salim Bashir
- 2021-2022: A.G Kalidas
- 2022-2023: Karen Cheah Yee Lynn
- 2024-2026: Mohamad Ezri b Abdul Wahab
- 2026-Now Anand Raj

== See also ==
- Certificate in Legal Practice (Malaysia)
- Kuala Lumpur Bar
