= Radhakrishna Ramani =

Malaysian lawyer

Dr. (Honorary) R. Ramani

2nd President of Malaya Bar Council
- In office 1953–1960
- Preceded by: E D Shearn
- Succeeded by: Morris Edgar

3rd President of Malaya Bar Council
- In office 1960–1963
- Preceded by: Morris Edgar
- Succeeded by: SM Yong

Personal details
- Born: 21 October 1901 Madras, Madras Presidency, British India
- Died: 30 September 1970 (aged 68) New York, United States
- Occupation: Lawyer

Radhakrishna Ramani (21 October 1901 – 30 September 1970) was a prominent Malaysian lawyer and the second president of Malaya Bar Council (Now known as Malaysian Bar Council). Ramani came from a Malaysian Indian ethnic background and he became the first Asian to serve as president of Malaya Bar Council. He also served as former the Permanent Representative of Malaysia to the United Nations. In 2015, he posthumously received the Lifetime Achievement Award from the Malaysian Bar council.
