= Raja Aziz Addruse =

Malaysian lawyer (1936–2011)

Yang Mulia Raja Aziz Addruse

President of Malaysian Bar Council
- In office 1976–1978
- Preceded by: V. C. George
- Succeeded by: Abdullah A. Rahman
- In office 1988–1989
- Preceded by: Param Cumaraswamy
- Succeeded by: S. Theivanthiram
- In office 1992–1993
- Preceded by: Manjeet Singh Dhillon
- Succeeded by: Zainur Zakaria

Personal details
- Born: 10 February 1936 Chemor, Perak
- Died: 12 July 2011 (aged 75) Kuala Lumpur, Malaysia
- Education: University of Bristol
- Occupation: Lawyer

Raja Abdul Aziz bin Raja Addruse (10 February 1936 – 12 July 2011) was a Malaysian lawyer. He served as President of the Bar Council three times and was a commissioner of the International Commission of Jurists. Raja Aziz is considered one of Malaysia's most respected lawyers. He was known among fellow lawyers as "Ungku."

== Early life and education ==
Raja Aziz Addruse was born in Chemor, Perak on 10 February 1936. He read law at the University of Bristol (from 1954) and was called to the English Bar by Lincoln's Inn in 1960.

== Career ==
Raja Aziz returned to Malaya in 1960 to become a deputy public prosecutor and later Deputy Parliamentary Draftsman. On 8 January 1966, he was admitted to the Malaysian Bar and entered private practice. He served as president of the Bar Council three times between 1976–1978, 1988–1989 and 1992–1993. He was affectionately called "Ungku" by fellow lawyers and has been described as one of Malaysia's most respected lawyers.

His second tenure as Bar Council president coincided with the 1988 Malaysian constitutional crisis, during which Lord President Salleh Abas was sacked by Prime Minister Mahathir Mohamad. He represented Salleh when the latter was brought before a tribunal on the grounds of misconduct.

Raja Aziz was the lead defence counsel in Anwar Ibrahim's corruption and first sodomy trial. He was expected to lead Anwar's defence team for the second sodomy trial, but stepped aside due to ill health.

In May 2006, Raja Aziz was elected as a Commissioner of the International Commission of Jurists, becoming the third Malaysian to hold the position.

He was also a counsel for former Communist Party of Malaya leader Chin Peng during the latter's 2009 bid to return to Malaysia.

Raja Aziz represented Sultan Ismail Petra who challenged his removal from the Kelantan throne in 2010.

== Views ==
Raja Aziz strongly backed Salleh Abas after the latter was sacked as Lord President. He refused to appear in the Supreme Court (now the Federal Court) during the term of Salleh's successor, Abdul Hamid Omar. In 2001, he criticised the appointment of Ahmad Fairuz Abdul Halim as Chief Judge of Malaya when a more senior member of the Federal Court was passed over.

At the Malaysian Law Conference in October 2007, he said: "Fundamental liberties no longer exist; this is a harsh thing to say but the courts don’t seem to think that fundamental rights are important. To me, the constitution now means nothing because it can be changed at any time."

Raja Aziz criticised Pakatan Rakyat for trying to disrupt the formation of a new state government during the 2009 Perak constitutional crisis, asking it to refer the matter to the courts (which it eventually did). He also called on Barisan Nasional supporters to respect Pakatan's right to challenge the Sultan of Perak's decision not to dissolve the state assembly in court.

== Personal life ==
Raja Aziz was married to Catherine and had two daughters.

== Death ==
Raja Aziz died at his home in Kuala Lumpur on 12 July 2011 from cancer. He was buried at Bukit Kiara Muslim cemetery the following day. Anwar Ibrahim attended the funeral.
