= South Australian Pipe Band Association =

The South Australian Pipe Band Association (SAPBA), is a state branch of the Australian Pipe Band Association, and exists to support pipe bands in South Australia.

== History ==
Following World War II, pipe bands in Adelaide were affiliated with the Brass Bands league and in the state's South-East many were members of the Victorian Highland Pipe Band Association(VHPBA). A series of meetings throughout the 1950s, mostly led by Angas Leggett, discussed band affairs in the state(with particular emphasis on those who were currently members of the VHPBA), and on 21 July 1954, the South East Pipe Band Centre(SEPBC) was formed.

The five bands present [Blue Lake Highland, Blue Lake Ladies, Tarpeena Highland, Naracoorte, Millicent Caledonian Society and Penola & District Caledonian] made the choice to adopt the Victorian contest rules, and work on promoting the music within the area.

At the same time, a similar group to the SEPBC formed in Adelaide. After unsuccessful talks with this group, and the VHPBA, the association decided to affiliate with neither. Instead, on 21 September 1960, the association re-incorporated as South Australian Pipe Band Association Inc. Later that year, on 28 September the decision was made to affiliate the Australian Federation of Pipe Band Associations, and this was formalised on 1 November.

Months afterwards, the first president Frank Collins, and secretary A. Turnbill held discussions with the remaining non-member bands in Adelaide, resulting in their subsequent merge. This bolstered the SAPBA's numbers to sixteen.

In the 1990s, the need for an organisation other than a loose federation was noted. In 1997 the Australian Highland Pipe Band Association was formed, and in 1999 SAPBA applied to become a state branch of this entity. Prior to this time, the association was governed by a council comprising a president, secretary, treasurer, two councillors and four members for each of the contest elements. This was changed to fall in line with national guidelines, and became only a president, two vice presidents and a secretary/treasurer.
