= Steven Thiru =

Malaysian lawyer

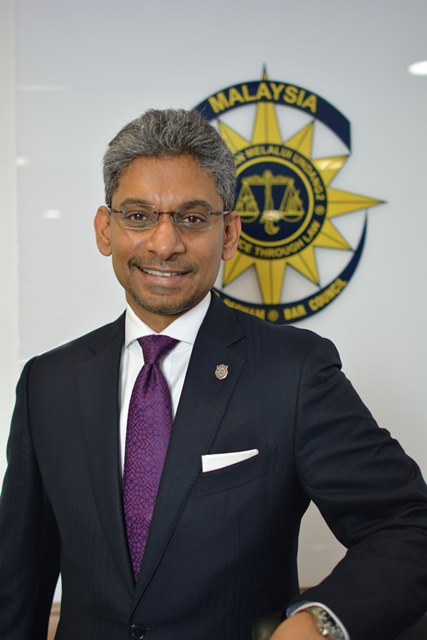

31st President of the Malaysian Bar
- In office March 2015 – March 2017
- Preceded by: Christopher Leong Sau Foo
- Succeeded by: George Varughese

Personal details
- Born: January 28, 1942 (age 84) or January 28, 1948 (age 78)
- Education: University of Leicester, England (LLB Law), University of Malaya (LLM)
- Occupation: Lawyer
- Awards: Legal 500 Asia Pacific (Leading Individual, Dispute Resolution, 2019, 2025)

Steven Thiruneelakandan is a Malaysian lawyer with practice areas in Employment law, Administrative law, and General Litigation. He became a partner in 2000.

== Education ==
Steven studied law at the University of Leicester, graduating in 1990. He was called to the Bar of England and Wales at Middle Temple in 1991, and was admitted as an Advocate and Solicitor of the High Court of Malaya in 1992. He received a Master of Laws (LL.M.) degree from the University of Malaya, graduating in 2000.

== Legal career ==
Steven has had an extensive legal career, focusing on litigation in Malaysia. His areas of practice include:

- Constitutional and administrative law
- Corporate and commercial law
- Employment and industrial relations law
- Energy law
- Native title law

== Leadership roles ==
=== President of the Malaysian Bar (2015–2017) ===
Thiru served as the 31st President of the Malaysian Bar from 2015 to 2017. During his tenure, he was involved in advocating for legal reforms, judicial independence, and human rights.

=== Commonwealth Lawyers Association (CLA) ===
A long-time member of the Commonwealth Lawyers Association, Thiru has been involved with the organization since 1999. He was elected Vice President (Australasia) in 2019 and has served on the CLA Executive Committee since then. In 2023, he was elected President of the CLA.

== Recognition and awards ==
- Ranked as a "Leading Individual for Dispute Resolution" by Legal 500 Asia Pacific (2019, 2025).
- Recognized as a "Distinguished Practitioner" by Asialaw (2020, 2021).
- Featured in Chambers Asia Pacific for Dispute Resolution (2018, 2022).
- Ranked as a Litigation Star in Labour & Employment Law by Benchmark Litigation Asia-Pacific (2024).
- Inducted into the Hall of Fame for Dispute Resolution in Legal 500 Asia Pacific (2025).
