= Commonwealth Lawyers Association =

Non-profit organization

- Abbreviation: CLA
- Formation: 1986
- Type: Non-governmental non-profit
- Headquarters: Canterbury, CT1 United Kingdom
- President: Steven Thiru
- Website: commonwealthlawyers.com

The Commonwealth Lawyers Association (CLA) is an organisation of lawyers, law societies and bar associations across the Commonwealth of Nations.

The association hosts a conference in a member nation of the commonwealth biennially.

== History ==
The CLA began as the Commonwealth & Empire Law Conference, first held in London in 1955. The Commonwealth Legal Bureau was subsequently established in 1968. The first Commonwealth Law Conference was held in Scotland in 1977. At the Commonwealth Law Conference held in Hong Kong in 1983 it was agreed that the CLB should be replaced by the Commonwealth Lawyers' Association (CLA) and a Constitution was subsequently adopted in Jamaica in 1986.

== Presidents ==
No.	Term	President	Notes
—	1983–1986	Lawrence Southwick (interim)	
1	1986–1990	Hurley Whitehorne	
2	1990–1993	Rodger Chongwe	
3	1993–1996	Paul D.K. Fraser	
4	1996–1999	Rodney Hansen	
5	1999–2003	Cyrus Das	
6	2003–2005	Colin Nicholls	
7	2005–2007	Graeme Mew	
8	2007–2009	Ron Heinrich	
9	2009–2011	Mohamed Husain	
10	2011–2013	Boma Ozobia	
11	2013–2015	Mark Stephens	
12	2015–2017	Alexander Ward	
13	2017–2019	R. Santhanakrishnan	
14	2019–2023	Brian Speers	
15	2023–2025	Peter D. Maynard	
16	2025–present	Steven Thiru	
