= City of Adelaide Pipe Band =

Australian pipe band

- Established: 1991
- Location: Adelaide, Australia
- Grade: 2
- Pipe major: Andrew Fuller
- Drum sergeant: Joshua Troup
- Tartan: Blue Ramsay
- Notable honours: Winner, Australian Pipe Band Championship: 1998
- Website: www.adelaidepipeband.com.au

The City of Adelaide Pipe Band is a grade three pipe band, based in City of Adelaide, South Australia. The band has won grade one at the 1998 Australian Championships and Grade two in 2008. It placed 4th in grade one at the New Zealand and South Pacific Championships, in Dunedin in 1999. The band is led by Pipe Major Andrew Fuller and Drum Sergeant Joshua Troup, and is a member of the South Australian Pipe Band Association.

== History ==
The City of Adelaide Pipe Band was formed to provide a high level competitive band, and an entertaining alternative to the city's brass band for the public. Formed in 1991 by a small group of senior musicians led by Brett Tidswell. The band wore the Drummond of Perth tartan, and bears the coat of arms of the City of Adelaide on cap badges, pipe banners and drums.

By 1992, the band was already competing in the South Australian competition at a grade two level, and earned its first title at the South Australian Pipe Band Championships, in Greenock. One year later, it won the Victorian Pipe Band Championships in Ringwood along with the South Australian competition title, which has remained in the band's hands for almost two decades.

During 1998, the band competed at a grade one level, winning the grade one title in the Australian Pipe Band world, first place in the Australian Pipe Band Championships held at Newcastle. In the same year, the band also received first-place prizes in South Australia (grades one and two) and Victoria (grade one).

In 2006, the band changed from its Drummond of Perth Tartan to the Blue Ramsay. City of Adelaide was also re-graded to grade 2 in 2006, and performed at the Festival Interceltique de Lorient in France.

In 2016, Brett Tidswell stepped down from the Pipe Major's position, after 25 years of running the band. Andrew Fuller was then elected as the new Pipe Major.

The band has an extensive learners and development program for pipers and drummers conducted at the Payneham RSL on Monday evenings.
