= Federal Government Girls' College, Abuloma =

- Abuloma, Port Harcourt, Rivers State; Nigeria

Information
- Motto: Pro Unitate
- Established: 1975
- Staff: 106
- Gender: Girls
- Enrollment: 1377
- Colours: white; red
- Website: fggcabuloma.net

Federal Government Girls' College, Abuloma is a girls' secondary school in Abuloma, Port Harcourt, Rivers State, established in 1975.

== History ==
Federal Government Girls' College, Abuloma was set up in 1974 and opened in 1975, in Bokokiri, Port Harcourt with 34 students, 8 teachers and 14 non-teaching staff. The first principal was Mrs. Okobi.

As part of an expansion in 1976, the school moved to another site in Abuloma.

In 1987, the school was affected by unrest.

Between 2006 and 2010, the Senior Secondary School and the Junior Secondary School were run separately.

It is one of over 100 Federal Government owned unity schools managed by the Federal Ministry of Education, Nigeria.

== Notable alumni ==
- Judith Amaechi, former First Lady of Rivers State
- Agbani Darego, model and beauty queen
- Muna, rapper
- Boma Ozobia, lawyer
