= Boma Ozobia =

Nigerian lawyer

Boma Ozobia OON
- Born: Bayelsa State, Nigeria
- Education: RSUST King's College London
- Occupation: Lawyer
- Office: President, CLA
- Term: 2011–2013

Boma Ozobia OON is a founding Partner of Sterling Partnership, Nigeria. She was also former President of the Commonwealth Lawyers Association (2011-2013), the first woman President in the history of the association.

== Early life and education ==
Boma is from Bayelsa State, Nigeria. She had her secondary school education at Federal Government Girls' College, Abuloma, Rivers State. Thereafter, she attended the Rivers State University where she graduated with a LLB and went for her LLM in King's College London.

== Career ==
Boma Ozobia was the Vice President of the Commonwealth Lawyers Association from 2009 to 2011 and became the President from 2011 to 2013. Before then, she was the chairperson, Association of Women Solicitors England and Wales (2005/2006); chair, NBA Section on Legal Practice Professional Development Committee. She is the founder and Senior partner of Sterling Partnership. She was also on the Board of Trustees of the Royal Commonwealth Society and was awarded the national honour of an Officer of the Order of the Niger (OON) in September 2014.

== Personal life ==
Her father attended the University College Ibadan. Her uncle Ambrose Alagoa was the first indigenous Chief Judge of Rivers State. Another uncle of hers, Justice Stanley Alagoa was also a lawyer who rose to the position of Supreme Court Justice in Nigeria. Her grandfather was also a Magistrate.
