= Victorian Highland Pipe Band Association =

Pipe band organization in Victoria, Australia

The Victorian Highland Pipe Band Association (VHPBA), is the oldest pipe band association in the world, having been established in 1924. It is separate from the state branch of the Australian Pipe Band Association (Pipe Bands Victoria) which is the organization coordinating Scottish Pipe band activities in Victoria, Australia.

Further information about the VHPBA can be found at its website vhpba.com.au

== History ==
After nearly seventy years of Highland musical contests in Australia in 1924, there were moves towards coordinating Victorian pipe band affairs. In a meeting at Geelong on 12 April that year, the Victorian Highland Pipe Band Association was formed. It was the first of its kind, anywhere in the world - predating even the Royal Scottish Pipe Band Association.

Initial efforts were focused on ensuring fair competition, including the election of knowledgeable, impartial judges and creating the competition rules. Unintentionally, the VHPBA had also become the national leader on all pipe band issues, and not long after its inception, had members from New South Wales, South Australia and Tasmania, in addition to the many Victorians present.

However, as the pipe band scene in Australia grew in the 1950-60s, associations were formed in other states. Toward the end of this period, it was realised that a national identity to oversee the organisations and coordination of a standardized ruling system was needed. Though only representatives from New South Wales and Victoria attended the meeting that formed the Australian Federation of Pipe Band Associations, all six states joined shortly after its founding.

Though the national body was responsible for communicating between the organizations, each individual member, including the Victorian Highland Pipe Band Association, retained control over its own state. This worked well for the next thirty years, until in the 1990s it was felt that the state associations needed to become branches of an amalgamated entity. In 1997 the Australian Pipe Band Association (Pipe Bands Australia) was created with a Victorian Branch (Pipe Bands Victoria). The Victorian Highland Pipe Band Association was retained as a separate legal entity (as applied to its counterparts in other States such as New South Wales and Queensland) and remains supportive of Victorian pipe bands.
