= Members of the Australian House of Representatives, 1937–1940 =

This is a list of the members of the Australian House of Representatives in the 15th Australian Parliament, which was elected at the 1937 election on 23 October 1937. The incumbent United Australia Party led by Prime Minister of Australia Joseph Lyons with coalition partner the Country Party led by Earle Page defeated the opposition Australian Labor Party led by John Curtin. At the 1934 election, nine seats in New South Wales were won by Lang Labor. Following the reunion of the two Labor parties in February 1936, these were held by their members as Labor seats at the 1937 election. With the party's win in Ballaarat and Gwydir (initially at a by-election on 8 March 1937), the Labor had a net gain of 11 seats compared with the previous election.

Member	Party	Electorate	State	In office
Larry Anthony	Country	Richmond	NSW	1937–1957
Oliver Badman	Country	Grey	SA	1932–1937 (S), 1937–1943
Frank Baker	Labor	Griffith	Qld	1931–1939
Claude Barnard	Labor	Bass	Tas	1934–1949
Jack Beasley	Labor	West Sydney	NSW	1928–1946
George Bell	United Australia	Darwin	Tas	1919–1922, 1925–1943
Maurice Blackburn	Labor/Independent	Bourke	Vic	1934–1943
Adair Blain	Independent	Northern Territory	NT	1934–1949
Frank Brennan	Labor	Batman	Vic	1911–1931, 1934–1949
Archie Cameron	Country	Barker	SA	1934–1956
Richard Casey	United Australia	Corio	Vic	1931–1940, 1949–1960
Joe Clark	Labor	Darling	NSW	1934–1969
Thomas Collins	Country	Hume	NSW	1931–1943
William Conelan	Labor	Griffith	Qld	1939–1949
Bernard Corser	Country	Wide Bay	Qld	1928–1954
John Curtin	Labor	Fremantle	WA	1928–1931, 1934–1945
John Dedman	Labor	Corio	Vic	1940–1949
Arthur Drakeford	Labor	Maribyrnong	Vic	1934–1955
Arthur Fadden	Country	Darling Downs	Qld	1936–1958
James Fairbairn	United Australia	Flinders	Vic	1933–1940
Frank Forde	Labor	Capricornia	Qld	1922–1946
Josiah Francis	United Australia	Moreton	Qld	1922–1955
Charles Frost	Labor	Franklin	Tas	1929–1931, 1934–1946
Joe Gander	Labor	Reid	NSW	1931–1940
Sydney Gardner	United Australia	Robertson	NSW	1922–1940
Albert Green	Labor	Kalgoorlie	WA	1922–1940
Henry Gregory	Country	Swan	WA	1913–1940
Henry Gullett	United Australia	Henty	Vic	1925–1940
Eric Harrison	United Australia	Wentworth	NSW	1931–1956
Charles Hawker	United Australia	Wakefield	SA	1929–1938
Jack Holloway	Labor	Melbourne Ports	Vic	1929–1951
Harold Holt	United Australia	Fawkner	Vic	1935–1967
Billy Hughes	United Australia	North Sydney	NSW	1901–1952
James Hunter	Country	Maranoa	Qld	1921–1940
William Hutchinson	United Australia	Deakin	Vic	1931–1949
Rowley James	Labor	Hunter	NSW	1928–1958
John Jennings	United Australia	Watson	NSW	1931–1940
William Jolly	United Australia	Lilley	Qld	1937–1943
Albert Lane	United Australia	Barton	NSW	1931–1940
George Lawson	Labor	Brisbane	Qld	1931–1961
John Lawson	United Australia	Macquarie	NSW	1931–1940
Bert Lazzarini	Labor	Werriwa	NSW	1919–1931, 1934–1952
Joseph Lyons	United Australia	Wilmot	Tas	1929–1939
Gerald Mahoney	Labor	Denison	Tas	1934–1940
Norman Makin	Labor	Hindmarsh	SA	1919–1946, 1954–1963
William Maloney	Labor	Melbourne	Vic	1904–1940
Sir Charles Marr	United Australia	Parkes	NSW	1919–1929, 1931–1943
George Martens	Labor	Herbert	Qld	1928–1946
William McCall	United Australia	Martin	NSW	1934–1943
John McEwen	Country	Indi	Vic	1934–1971
Sydney McHugh	Labor	Wakefield	SA	1938–1940
Robert Menzies	United Australia	Kooyong	Vic	1934–1966
Dan Mulcahy	Labor	Lang	NSW	1934–1953
Walter Nairn	United Australia	Perth	WA	1929–1943
Horace Nock	Country	Riverina	NSW	1931–1940
Sir Earle Page	Country	Cowper	NSW	1919–1961
Thomas Paterson	Country	Gippsland	Vic	1922–1943
John Perkins	United Australia	Eden-Monaro	NSW	1926–1929, 1931–1943
Reg Pollard	Labor	Ballaarat	Vic	1937–1966
John Price	United Australia	Boothby	SA	1928–1941
John Prowse	Country	Forrest	WA	1919–1943
George Rankin	Country	Bendigo	Vic	1937–1949, 1950–1956 (S)
Bill Riordan	Labor	Kennedy	Qld	1936–1966
Sol Rosevear	Labor	Dalley	NSW	1931–1953
Thomas Scholfield	United Australia	Wannon	Vic	1931–1940
James Scullin	Labor	Yarra	Vic	1910–1913, 1922–1949
William Scully	Labor	Gwydir	NSW	1937–1949
Tom Sheehan	Labor	Cook	NSW	1937–1955
Percy Spender	Independent/United Australia	Warringah	NSW	1937–1951
Lancelot Spurr	Labor	Wilmot	Tas	1939–1940
Fred Stacey	United Australia	Adelaide	SA	1931–1943
Frederick Stewart	United Australia	Parramatta	NSW	1931–1946
Geoffrey Street	United Australia	Corangamite	Vic	1934–1940
Victor Thompson	Country	New England	NSW	1922–1940
Harold Thorby	Country	Calare	NSW	1931–1940
Eddie Ward	Labor	East Sydney	NSW	1931, 1932–1963
David Oliver Watkins	Labor	Newcastle	NSW	1935–1958
Thomas White	United Australia	Balaclava	Vic	1929–1951
Alexander Wilson	Independent	Wimmera	Vic	1937–1945
