= 1931 United Australia Party leadership election =

- 7 May 1931
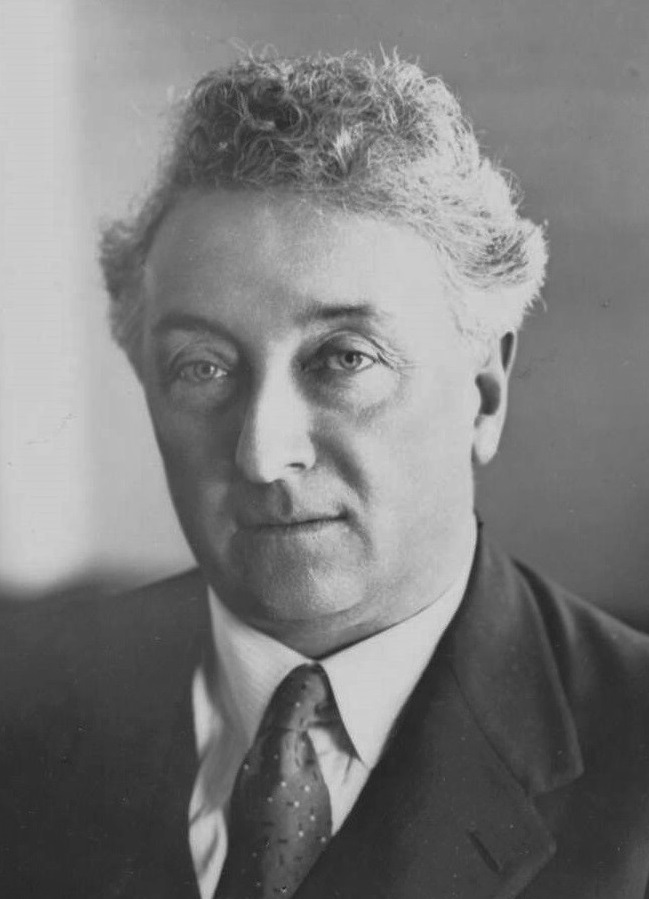

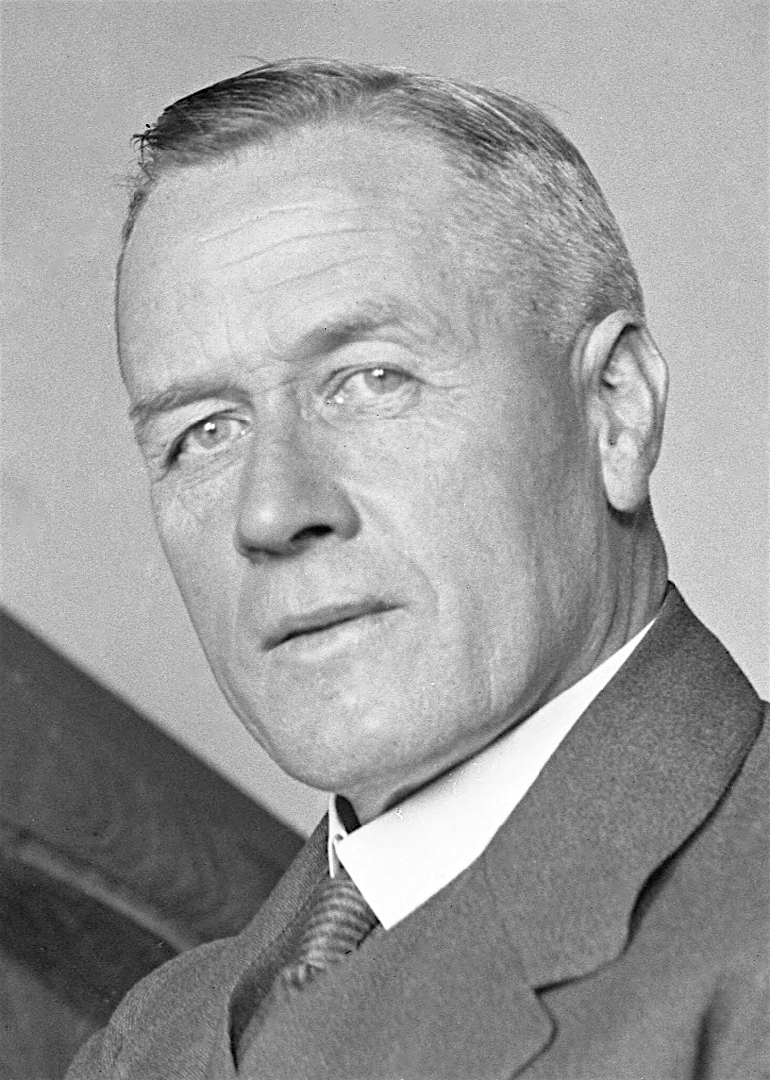
Candidate	Joseph Lyons	John Latham
Party	All for Australia	Nationalist
Votes	Unopposed	Withdrew
Leader before election
None
Elected Leader
Joseph Lyons

The nascent United Australia Party (UAP) held a leadership election on 7 May 1931 to determine the leadership of the new party, and consequently who would have the role of Leader of the Opposition in the federal parliament.

== Background ==
Party politics were in disarray in Australia following the defeat of the government of Stanley Bruce at the 1929 federal election and the election of the Labor government of James Scullin. Bruce lost his seat in the election, and was forced to relinquish the leadership of the Nationalist Party to his deputy, John Latham. Latham assumed the role of Leader of the Opposition atop the remaining Nationalist MPs who had not either been defeated or defected. That election was caused by a dispute within the Nationalist Party over industrial relations, causing former Prime Minister Billy Hughes to leave the party and set up the Australian Party.

As the Great Depression hit Australia, economic policy was the centre of debate within the Scullin government. Joseph Lyons and James Fenton differed on proposals for economic recovery, both resigning from the cabinet. On 13 March 1931, though still a Labor MP, Lyons supported a no confidence motion against the Scullin government. Soon afterward, he, Fenton and four other right-wing Labor MPs—Moses Gabb, Allan Guy, Charles McGrath and John Price—resigned from Labor in protest of the government's economic policies. Five of the six Labor dissidents (Gabb the exception) formed the All for Australia League and crossed the floor to the opposition benches.

== Leadership candidates ==
The three parties joining to form the UAP were the All for Australia League, Australian Party and Nationalist Party. Each already had a leader of their own with supporters inside and outside of parliament.

Party	Name	Positions
Australian Party	Billy Hughes	MP for North Sydney (since 1922); Leader of the Australian Party (since 1929); Prime Minister of Australia (1915-23)
Nationalist Party	John Latham	MP for Kooyong (since 1922); Leader of the Nationalist Party (since 1929); Leader of the Opposition (since 1929); Attorney-General of Australia (1925-29)
All for Australia League	Joseph Lyons	MP for Wilmot (since 1929); Leader of the All for Australia League (since 1931); Minister for Works and Railways (1929-31); Premier of Tasmania (1923-28)

== Outcome ==
An uncontested leadership was viewed as a way of showing party unity. Therefore, Latham, despite leading the largest of the three non-Labor parties, made way for Lyons. Latham was praised for this with one editorial stating "... the remarkably unselfish attitude of the Leader of the Nationalist Party, Mr Latham. Mr Latham's, dramatic move was so unlike that of any politician before him that Australia found it difficult to understand. It is clear now, however, that Mr Latham was guided by a sincere patriotism to sink his personal ambitions for the good of the nation as a whole."

Latham's unexpected declination, led to Lyons being elected unopposed at the first party room meeting of the UAP. Latham was elected deputy leader, likewise unopposed, and Hughes was admitted to the party alongside former Nationalist defectors to the Australian Party, Walter Duncan and Walter Marks.
