= Harry Hatwell =

Harry Sumner Hatwell (28 September 1880 – 30 December 1947) was a house painter in South Australia, best known as a two-term mayor of Thebarton. He made several attempts at parliamentary honours for the United Australia Party.

== History ==
Hatwell was born in Terowie, South Australia, 28 September 1880 — the night of a terrible storm, the roof of the house being blown away.

His father, Henry Sumner Hatwell (8 October 1856 – 21 August 1948), arrived in South Australia by the Cuzco on 6 November 1877. He married Frances Gertrude Neate on 30 April 1878; she died in Narracoorte on 3 July 1879. He married 30 March 1880 Susanna Martha Shearwin, She died 5 May 1916. They moved to Outalpa homestead (32.24°S 140.228°E) in 1880, working for the (co-)owner Henry Foote (1820–1893), and from 1882 to 1886 leased from Foote the eating-house (which perhaps also offered accommodation). The location, between Mannahill and Olary, became known as "Martha's Well", catering for stagecoach passengers travelling to and from Broken Hill. He next worked for the South Australian Railways as a painter. Among other jobs, he painted the original railway bridge at Murray Bridge.

Hatwell was in business as a master painter, having started at age 11 working for his father. In 1914 he went into partnership with George Juncken as Hatwell & Juncken, and when his father left the railways he joined them. Juncken retired and the firm became Hatwell & Hatwell. In 1921 Hatwell bought his father's interest in the company and re-formed the business as Hatfield & Co. By 1937 he was employing 30 men, notably keeping them all employed during the Great Depression. In 1924 he was elected president of the council of the Master Painters' Decorators' and Signwriters' Association of Australia, and served as its secretary for 29 years.

=== Council ===
Hatwell was first elected councillor to the Town of Thebarton around 1914 and served with the council every year but one until July 1947, when he did not nominate for health reasons.

At the municipal elections of November 1926 (South Australia was the only Australian State where mayors were elected by ratepayers), Hatwell succeeded Isley unopposed in November 1926 and reelected unopposed in 1927.

=== Politics ===
Hatwell contested the State South Australian House of Assembly seat of West Torrens as an Independent in 1933; won by the Labor incumbent Alfred Blackwell.

He contested the federal House of Representatives seat of Hindmarsh for the United Australia Party in 1937 and 1940; on both occasions being defeated by the strong Labor incumbent, Norman Makin.

=== Personal ===
His chief recreation was angling; he was a member of the SA Angling Association. He was a member of the Adelaide Rotary Club, a director of Adelaide Co-operative Stores, and helped establish the Lady Gowrie Child Centre. He was a warden of Holy Trinity Church and a Freemason. He was a pioneering motorist, making several notable journeys. He married (Mary) Elsie Ann Cooke (1883–1973) on 1 August 1906; they had two sons and three daughters:

- (Harry Edwin) Milton Hatwell (1907–2001)
- Mary Elsie Katherina Hatwell (1910–1996) married Arthur Ronald Grantley Nurse on 2 April 1932
- (Stephen) Mervyn Hatwell (1915–1995)
- Martha Isabella Hatfield (born 21 October 1918) married Ivan Comley, lived in Mile End
- Youngest Sarah Millicent Hatwell (1922–2012) appeared in a newspaper photo with Martha in 1939 engaged to Brian Sandow 1942. In 1945 he became engaged to someone else. She married James Archibald Still.

His siblings include (third son) William James Sumner Hatwell (9 November 1885 – 24 April 1944), born at Outalpa Walter Sumner Hatwell (1889–1969), Florence Martha "Florrie" Hatwell (1891–1957), Sarah Maude "Maudie" Hatwell (1893–1980), Jack Sumner Hatwell (1898–1968) and Beryl Eveleyn Hatwell (1901–1981).

He died at his home at 98 Henley Beach Road, Mile End, aged 67, on 30 December 1947. His remains were interred at the West Terrace Cemetery. His father died eight months later.
