= Basil Helmore =

Basil Arthur Helmore OBE (28 February 1897 – 4 November 1973) was an Australian solicitor and businessman.

Born at Newcastle to company secretary Ernest Arthur James Helmore and Gertrude, née Allbon, he attended local state schools and in 1913 was first in the state in French and Latin for the Leaving certificate. He became an articled clerk with Sparke & Millard in 1914 but suspended his articles to enlist in the Australian Imperial Force (5 September 1916), in which he became a gunner. After training in England he was sent to the Western Front with the 4th Field Artillery Brigade in August 1917; in October 1918 he began work with the AIF Education Scheme and returned to Sydney in June 1919. Helmore was admitted as a solicitor in November 1920 and became a partner in the firm (now Sparke & Helmore). At Lake Macquarie on 4 November 1922 he married Jessie Wilhelmina Cannington. Helmore also edited four legal textbooks and qualified by correspondence for his Bachelor of Law (1933) and PhD (1955) from the University of London. He was involved in various legal societies as president of the Newcastle Law Society (1957–58) and councillor of the Incorporated Law Institute of New South Wales (1953–60).

Helmore contested the Senate unsuccessfully in 1937 as a United Australia Party candidate; he would also make an unsuccessful attempt to enter the New South Wales Legislative Council in 1948. In 1960 he was elected to the council of the University of Newcastle, which he had helped found; he was later deputy chairman (1965–66) and warden of convocation (1967). He was appointed Officer of the Order of the British Empire in 1971. Helmore died at Newcastle in 1973 and was cremated.
