= Frederick Alexander James =

Australian merchant (1884–1957)

Frederick Alexander James (17 December 1884 – 19 March 1957) was an Australian merchant and litigant.

Born at East Marden in South Australia to Thomas James and Emily, née Pitt, he received a sketchy education and after studying at the Muirden College for Business Training joined his father's fruit business Trevarno, which he and his brother took over in 1910. He married Rachel May Scarborough on 19 October 1910 at Glenelg. After a financial disaster during World War I when the brothers were left out of pocket after shipping a quantity of fruit to Germany, they dissolved the partnership and Frederick established new orchards at Berri, successfully dealing in dried fruit from 1920. He stayed out of the Australian Dried Fruits Association in protest at the restrictive sale rules. During this period he also gained extensive familiarity with Australia's Constitution.

In 1925 James successfully sold large quantities of his export quota to New Zealand, but his contracts were annulled when he tried to repeat his feat the following year. He successfully had his quota raised, but on the advice of a solicitor sold more than double his quota to brokers in New South Wales and Victoria, resulting in the South Australian Dried Fruits Control Board initiating legal proceedings against him. The High Court ruled in favour of James, as it was often to do, in James v. South Australia (1927). He was also successful in James v. The Commonwealth (1928), but the court ruled against him in James v. Cowan (1930), upholding the state's right to invoke compulsory acquisition; this was reversed by the Privy Council in 1932. James was involved in many significant legal cases in the 1930s and won most of them.

Originally a Country Party member, he left when it embraced organized marketing and, after an unsuccessful attempt to gain United Australia Party preselection, ran for the Senate in 1937 on an independent ticket, winning 7.9% of the vote. In 1936 his wife initiated divorce proceedings but James persuaded her to settle out of court. She died in 1949 and he remarried Constance Winifred Timothy-Keighley on 19 April 1950. He died at Toorak Gardens in 1957.
