= Stan Taylor (barrister) =

Australian judge (1896–1982)

- Born: Stanley Cassin Taylor; 7 December 1896; Rylstone, New South Wales
- Died: August 9, 1982 (aged 85); Mosman, Sydney, New South Wales
- Occupations: Barrister; Judge
- Spouse: Gwendoline Taylor (née Cansdell)

Stanley Cassin Taylor (7 December 1896 – 9 August 1982) was an Australian barrister and judge. Taylor served as the President of Industrial Commission of New South Wales between 1942 and 1966.

== Background and early career ==
He was born at Rylstone to farmer John Orchard Taylor and Helen Russell, née Clarke. He attended Burwood Superior Public School before becoming a junior clerk with the State Department of the Attorney-General and of Justice in November 1912. He joined the Australian Labor Party at the age of seventeen and was active in the anti-conscription campaigns of 1916–17. He ran unsuccessfully for Ryde at the 1925 state election, but was expelled from 1927 to 1930. On his readmittance he was part of the Lang Labor faction, running for North Sydney as a Lang Labor candidate at the 1934 federal election. He was called to the Bar on 25 May 1934. He ran for the reunited Labor Party as the candidate for Martin in 1937.

== Career ==
Taylor married shorthand writer Gwendoline Heather Cansdell on 16 June 1934 at Windsor. He continued to rise in Labor politics, partly through his connection to William McKell. He was appointed deputy director of the wartime Commonwealth security service in 1942 by the Curtin Labor government, for which he was barely qualified; McKell, as Premier, appointed him president of the Industrial Commission of New South Wales later the same year, again over the heads of more qualified candidates. He worked primarily through networking and bargaining, and his greatest success was the mutually satisfactory industrial relations for the Snowy Mountains hydro-electric scheme. His pragmatism saw him well respected by the time he retired in 1966, enough to be employed as an independent arbitrator.

As a judge Taylor was known for informality and boisterousness; he was said to have trained with boxer Les Darcy and often engaged in wrestling contests during luncheon. His Industrial Commission colleagues became increasingly distant from him and in 1955 his relationship with shady Bankstown contractor and journalist Ray Fitzpatrick tainted his name. Taylor was accused of turning a blind eye and, indeed, shielding Fitzpatrick from the law, and he probably leaked a document linking Labor MP Charles Morgan to immigration rackets in the 1930s, which was connected to Morgan's infamous case against Frank Browne.

As an advocate for police awards, in 1946 he handed down the first award for the NSW Police Service; which subsequently enabled the expansion of police awards nationally. Taylor was awarded life membership of the Police Association of NSW.

On 28 January 1955 Taylor appeared before the royal commission on espionage, where it was alleged that he had compromised the identity of a secret agent by passing information to the Communist Party of Australia. Although he was not indicted by the commission, he was reported on favourably to the Comintern and further inquiries suggested that the Fitzpatrick affair may not have been an isolated occurrence. He was increasingly ostracised but turned this towards settling disputes in remote areas of New South Wales, winning admiration for effective conciliation tactics.

== Personal life and latter years ==
Following his retirement, he remained involved in industrial affairs. His wife died in 1970 and Taylor began work as a yardman, living at the Bundarra pub. He returned to Sydney with failing health and died at Mosman in 1982; he was survived by his two daughters.
