= George Rankin =

Australian Army officer and politician (1887–1957)

Major General George Rankin DSO & Bar VD
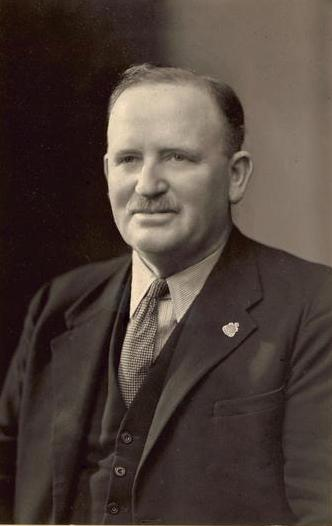

Member of the Australian Parliament for Bendigo
- In office 23 October 1937 – 31 October 1949
- Preceded by: Eric Harrison
- Succeeded by: Percy Clarey

Senator for Victoria
- In office 22 February 1950 – 30 June 1956

Personal details
- Born: 1 May 1887 Bamawm, Victoria
- Died: 28 December 1957 (aged 70) Rochester, Victoria
- Party: Australian Country Party
- Spouse: Annie Isabella Oliver
- Occupation: Soldier

Military service
- Allegiance: Australia
- Branch/service: Citizens Military Force
- Years of service: 1907–1944
- Rank: Major General
- Commands: 2nd Cavalry Division (1936–42); 5th Cavalry Brigade (1926–31, 1933–36); 17th Light Horse Regiment (1920–23); 4th Light Horse Regiment (1919)
- Battles/wars: First World War; Gallipoli Campaign; Sinai and Palestine Campaign; Battle of Beersheba; Capture of Damascus; Second World War
- Awards: Distinguished Service Order & Bar; Mentioned in Despatches (2); Colonial Auxiliary Forces Officers' Decoration

George James Rankin, DSO & Bar, VD (1 May 1887 – 28 December 1957) was an Australian soldier and politician. He served in both the House of Representatives and the Senate, representing the Country Party of Australia.

== Early life ==
Rankin was born at Bamawm, Victoria, the tenth child of Irish farmer James Rankin and Sarah, née Gallagher. He attended the local state school and became a farmer. In 1907, he joined the Militia, and was commissioned in the 9th Light Horse Regiment in 1909. He married Annie Isabella Oliver at Rochester, Victoria on 7 July 1912. In 1914, he was appointed a lieutenant of the Australian Imperial Force and posted to the 4th Light Horse Regiment.

== Military service ==
Rankin served in the 4th Light Horse Regiment and reached Gallipoli in May 1915, was wounded in July, became a captain in December, and a major in March 1916. He also served in the Sinai, and was second in command of his unit from August 1917. Rankin was present at the famous charge at Beersheba on 31 October, and in 1918 was awarded the Distinguished Service Order (DSO) for his gallantry. His leadership subsequently earned him a Bar to his DSO. The bar's citation reads:

For great gallantry, dash and initiative during the operations from El Kuneitra to Damascus. On the 30th September, 1918, when his regiment acted as advance guard from Sasa to Kaukab, owing to his rapid movements, they captured 340 prisoners, 1 field gun and 8 machine guns. Kaukab was strongly held by the enemy, and when this officer was ordered to make a frontal attack his leadership was excellent and his regiment seized all objectives, capturing 9 officers, over 70 other ranks and 8 machine guns. In this action the enemy's cavalry were driven in disorder towards Damascus. On the morning of the 1st October, 1918, when ordered to seize the Military Barracks in Damascus, he showed great skill in manoeuvring his troops in such a manner that he was largely instrumental in capturing the whole enemy garrison in Damascus, numbering over 11,000.

After the conclusion of the war, Rankin was sent to Egypt to suppress a rebellion, after which he returned to Australia. He returned to the Militia, becoming a brigadier in 1936 and a major general in 1937. During this time, he developed an interest in politics, in particular the Country Party.

== Federal politics ==
Rankin was elected chief president of the Victorian United Country Party (VUCP) in 1937, but resigned later that year in order to contest the seat of Bendigo in the Australian House of Representatives. He was elected, and became part of the faction of the Country Party that advocated coalition with the United Australia Party. However, he was forced to back down on this by the State council of the VUCP.

Rankin became well known as an advocate of returned servicemen and wheat-farmers. He was a voracious critic of the Labor governments of John Curtin and Ben Chifley. When in 1949, an electoral redistribution substantially changed Rankin's seat, he contested the Senate instead and won. He was returned in 1951, but his parliamentary activity steadily decreased. He remained an active and vigorous anti-communist until his retirement, due to ill health, in 1955.

Rankin died of cerebrovascular disease on 28 December 1957 at Rochester, where he was buried, and was survived by his wife.

== In popular culture ==
He was played by Serge Lazareff in the film The Lighthorsemen (1987).

== Sources ==
- Saunders, Malcolm (2002). "Rankin, George James (1887–1957)". Australian Dictionary of Biography. National Centre of Biography, Australian National University. ISBN 978-0-522-84459-7. ISSN 1833-7538. OCLC 70677943.

Parliament of Australia
| Preceded by Eric Harrison | Member for Bendigo; 1937–1949 | Succeeded by Percy Clarey |
