= 1940 Australian House of Representatives election =

Australian federal election, 21 September 1940 House of Representatives << 1937–1943 >>
Enrolled voters	4,239,486				
Votes cast	3,979,009		Turnout	93.86	–1.31
Informal votes	101,278		Informal	2.55	–0.04
Summary of votes by party
Party	Primary votes	%	Swing	Seats	Change
Labor	1,556,941	40.16%	–3.01%	32	+ 3
United Australia	1,172,788	30.24%	–3.47%	23	– 5
Country	524,042	13.51%	–2.04%	13	– 3
Labor (N-C)	203,081	5.24%	+5.24%	4	+ 4
State Labor	101,191	2.61%	+2.61%	0	± 0
Defence Movement	15,313	0.40%	+0.40%	0	± 0
Protestant Labour	8,300	0.21%	+0.21%	0	± 0
Independent	289,335	7.46%	+2.57%	2	± 0
Total	3,877,731			74	

This is a list of electoral division results for the Australian 1940 federal election.

== New South Wales ==
=== Barton ===
1940 Australian federal election: Barton
Party	Candidate	Votes	%	±%
Labor	H. V. Evatt	35,425	57.4	+16.4
United Australia	Albert Lane	21,845	35.4	−13.9
Labor (N-C)	John Rose	2,643	4.3	+4.3
State Labor	Sam Lewis	1,111	1.8	+1.8
Independent	John Mackay	484	0.8	+0.8
Defence Movement	Robert Mackie	155	0.3	+0.3
Total formal votes		61,663	97.6	
Informal votes		1,539	2.4	
Turnout		63,202	96.8	
Two-party-preferred result
Labor	H. V. Evatt		62.1	+13.9
United Australia	Albert Lane		37.9	−13.9
Labor gain from United Australia		Swing	+13.9	

=== Calare ===
1940 Australian federal election: Calare
Party	Candidate	Votes	%	±%
Country	Harold Thorby	17,227	36.4	−11.4
Labor	John Breen	12,589	26.6	−21.2
Labor (N-C)	John Heiss	6,592	13.9	+13.9
State Labor	Greg McGirr	5,502	11.6	+11.6
Country	Herbert Hodby	4,027	8.5	+8.5
Independent	Richard Brazier	1,435	3.0	+3.0
Total formal votes		47,372	95.9	
Informal votes		2,017	4.1	
Turnout		49,389	94.0	
Two-party-preferred result
Labor	John Breen	25,272	53.4	+5.6
Country	Harold Thorby	22,090	46.6	−5.6
Labor gain from Country		Swing	+5.6	

=== Cook ===
1940 Australian federal election: Cook
Party	Candidate	Votes	%	±%
Labor (N-C)	Tom Sheehan	31,625	58.4	+58.4
Labor	Jock Garden	17,634	32.6	−37.7
Independent Labor	Cyril Glassop	4,901	9.0	+9.0
Total formal votes		54,160	96.4	
Informal votes		2,041	3.6	
Turnout		56,201	95.5	
Two-party-preferred result
Labor (N-C)	Tom Sheehan		63.6	+63.6
Labor	Jock Garden		36.4	−33.9
Labor (N-C) gain from Labor		Swing	+33.9	

=== Cowper ===
1940 Australian federal election: Cowper
Party	Candidate	Votes	%	±%
Country	Sir Earle Page	27,773	53.7	−9.5
Labor	Myles Kelly	11,350	21.9	−14.9
Independent	Joseph McElhone	8,391	16.2	+16.2
Independent	John Cain	4,243	8.2	+8.2
Total formal votes		51,757	98.3	
Informal votes		909	1.7	
Turnout		52,666	95.0	
Two-party-preferred result
Country	Sir Earle Page		64.9	+1.7
Labor	Myles Kelly		33.1	−1.7
Country hold		Swing	−13.0	

=== Dalley ===
1940 Australian federal election: Dalley
Party	Candidate	Votes	%	±%
Labor (N-C)	Sol Rosevear	20,721	37.2	+37.2
Labor	Donald Cochrane	18,643	33.5	−24.2
United Australia	Hubert O'Connell	14,736	26.5	−15.8
State Labor	Edmund Ryan	1,564	2.8	+2.8
Total formal votes		55,664	97.5	
Informal votes		1,423	2.5	
Turnout		57,087	95.6	
Two-party-preferred result
Labor (N-C)	Sol Rosevear	31,842	57.2	+57.2
Labor	Donald Cochrane	23,822	42.8	−14.9
Labor (N-C) gain from Labor		Swing	+14.9	

=== Darling ===
1940 Australian federal election: Darling
Party	Candidate	Votes	%	±%
Labor	Joe Clark	29,128	63.4	−2.8
Independent	Alexander Huie	10,648	23.2	−10.6
Labor (N-C)	Les Murphy	6,158	13.4	+13.4
Total formal votes		45,934	97.4	
Informal votes		1,229	2.6	
Turnout		47,163	87.3	
Two-party-preferred result
Labor	Joe Clark		73.5	+7.3
Independent	Alexander Huie		26.5	−7.3
Labor hold		Swing	+7.3	

=== East Sydney ===
1940 Australian federal election: East Sydney
Party	Candidate	Votes	%	±%
Labor	Eddie Ward	23,685	49.1	−6.9
United Australia	Lewis Nott	12,211	25.3	−9.7
Labor (N-C)	Steve Gould	5,547	11.5	+11.5
United Australia	James Catts	2,508	5.2	+5.2
Independent	Fred Aarons	2,264	4.7	+4.7
Independent	Diana Gould	1,867	3.9	+3.9
Atokist	Louis Phillips	187	0.4	+0.4
Total formal votes		48,269	95.3	
Informal votes		2,386	4.7	
Turnout		50,655	90.5	
Two-party-preferred result
Labor	Eddie Ward		66.1	+8.1
United Australia	Lewis Nott		33.9	−8.1
Labor hold		Swing	+8.1	

=== Eden-Monaro ===
1940 Australian federal election: Eden-Monaro
Party	Candidate	Votes	%	±%
Labor	Herb Turner	16,736	34.5	−8.0
United Australia	John Perkins	13,092	27.0	−30.5
United Australia	Frank Louat	6,173	12.7	+12.7
United Australia	Pat Osborne	4,763	9.8	+9.8
Labor (N-C)	Benjamin Kelly	4,575	9.4	+9.4
United Australia	Roy May	1,175	2.4	+2.4
Independent	George Alam	1,018	2.1	+2.1
Independent	Rupert Beale	987	2.0	+2.0
Total formal votes		48,519	95.5	
Informal votes		2,263	4.5	
Turnout		50,782	95.1	
Two-party-preferred result
United Australia	John Perkins	26,575	54.8	−2.7
Labor	Herb Turner	21,944	45.2	+2.7
United Australia hold		Swing	−2.7	

=== Gwydir ===
1940 Australian federal election: Gwydir
Party	Candidate	Votes	%	±%
Labor	William Scully	27,231	55.4	+3.0
Country	Ben Wade	13,373	27.2	−4.6
Country	Ernest Batchelor	7,738	15.8	+15.8
Independent	Frederick Deakins	788	1.6	+1.6
Total formal votes		49,130	98.2	
Informal votes		881	1.8	
Turnout		50,011	92.2	
Two-party-preferred result
Labor	William Scully		58.8	+6.4
Country	Ben Wade		41.2	−6.4
Labor hold		Swing	+6.4	

=== Hume ===
1940 Australian federal election: Hume
Party	Candidate	Votes	%	±%
Country	Thomas Collins	21,369	42.2	−11.9
Labor	Clarence Nolan	11,584	22.9	−23.0
Labor (N-C)	Arthur Fuller	11,037	21.8	+21.8
Defence Movement	Eric Roberts	4,188	8.3	+8.3
State Labor	John Fisher	2,473	4.9	+4.9
Total formal votes		50,661	98.0	
Informal votes		1,026	2.0	
Turnout		51,687	93.8	
Two-party-preferred result
Country	Thomas Collins	25,791	50.9	−3.2
Labor	Clarence Nolan	24,870	49.1	+3.2
Country hold		Swing	−3.2	

=== Hunter ===
1940 Australian federal election: Hunter
Party	Candidate	Votes	%	±%
Labor	Rowley James	38,921	75.0	−25.0
State Labor	Bill Gollan	12,956	25.0	+25.0
Total formal votes		51,877	97.1	
Informal votes		1,524	2.9	
Turnout		53,401	95.3	
Labor hold		Swing	−25.0	

=== Lang ===
1940 Australian federal election: Lang
Party	Candidate	Votes	%	±%
Labor (N-C)	Dan Mulcahy	23,298	38.0	+38.0
United Australia	Bertram Stevens	15,615	25.4	−9.7
Labor	John Metcalfe	12,487	20.3	−30.1
United Australia	Matthew Calman	5,626	9.2	+9.2
State Labor	Arthur Robinson	3,738	6.1	+6.1
United Australia	Stanley Willmott	608	1.0	+1.0
Total formal votes		61,372	96.7	
Informal votes		2,064	3.3	
Turnout		63,436	97.4	
Two-party-preferred result
Labor (N-C)	Dan Mulcahy	40,517	66.0	+66.0
United Australia	Bertram Stevens	20,855	34.0	−13.4
Labor (N-C) gain from Labor		Swing	+13.4	

=== Macquarie ===
1940 Australian federal election: Macquarie
Party	Candidate	Votes	%	±%
Labor	Ben Chifley	22,660	44.6	−3.3
United Australia	John Lawson	20,468	40.3	−11.8
Labor (N-C)	Bernard Cunningham	7,660	15.1	+15.1
Total formal votes		50,788	98.7	
Informal votes		665	1.3	
Turnout		51,453	94.2	
Two-party-preferred result
Labor	Ben Chifley	29,493	58.1	+10.2
United Australia	John Lawson	21,295	41.9	−10.2
Labor gain from United Australia		Swing	+10.2	

=== Martin ===
1940 Australian federal election: Martin
Party	Candidate	Votes	%	±%
United Australia	William McCall	28,727	50.1	−6.0
Labor	Raymond Watt	20,036	35.0	−1.6
State Labor	Rupert Lockwood	8,555	14.9	+14.9
Total formal votes		57,318	98.5	
Informal votes		853	1.5	
Turnout		58,171	96.6	
Two-party-preferred result
United Australia	William McCall		52.6	−7.7
Labor	Raymond Watt		47.4	+7.7
United Australia hold		Swing	−7.7	

=== New England ===
1940 Australian federal election: New England
Party	Candidate	Votes	%	±%
Country	Joe Abbott	16,898	34.8	+34.8
Labor	Leigh Cuthbertson	16,085	33.1	−5.9
Country	Victor Thompson	11,635	24.0	−37.0
Country	Donald Shand	3,938	8.1	+8.1
Total formal votes		48,556	98.0	
Informal votes		966	2.0	
Turnout		49,522	95.0	
Two-party-preferred result
Country	Joe Abbott	29,440	60.6	−0.4
Labor	Leigh Cuthbertson	19,116	39.4	+0.4
Country hold		Swing	−0.4	

=== Newcastle ===
1940 Australian federal election: Newcastle
Party	Candidate	Votes	%	±%
Labor	David Watkins	44,170	74.4	−4.9
State Labor	Tom Hickey	9,029	15.2	+15.2
Independent	Arthur Clarke	6,190	10.4	+10.4
Total formal votes		59,389	97.3	
Informal votes		1,649	2.7	
Turnout		61,038	95.6	
Two-party-preferred result
Labor	David Watkins		78.6	−0.7
State Labor	Tom Hickey		21.4	+21.4
Labor hold		Swing	−0.7	

=== North Sydney ===
1940 Australian federal election: North Sydney
Party	Candidate	Votes	%	±%
United Australia	Billy Hughes	38,381	61.3	−4.6
State Labor	William Wilson	10,965	17.5	+17.5
Labor	James Dooley	9,704	15.5	−12.4
Labor (N-C)	John Steel	3,526	5.6	+5.6
Total formal votes		62,576	98.2	
Informal votes		1,170	1.8	
Turnout		63,746	95.5	
Two-party-preferred result
United Australia	Billy Hughes		67.6	−1.4
State Labor	William Wilson		32.4	+32.4
United Australia hold		Swing	−1.4	

=== Parkes ===
1940 Australian federal election: Parkes
Party	Candidate	Votes	%	±%
United Australia	Sir Charles Marr	28,909	50.5	−13.2
Labor	Daniel Murphy	21,565	37.7	+1.4
Independent	David Knox	6,785	11.8	+11.8
Total formal votes		57,259	98.6	
Informal votes		833	1.4	
Turnout		58,092	95.6	
Two-party-preferred result
United Australia	Sir Charles Marr		57.4	−6.3
Labor	Daniel Murphy		42.6	+6.3
United Australia hold		Swing	−6.3	

=== Parramatta ===
1940 Australian federal election: Parramatta
Party	Candidate	Votes	%	±%
United Australia	Sir Frederick Stewart	25,561	42.4	−25.5
Labor	Albert Rowe	10,553	17.5	−8.9
United Australia	Gordon Wallace	7,437	12.3	+12.3
United Australia	Norman Rydge	7,189	11.9	+11.9
Labor (N-C)	James Dalton	5,639	9.3	+9.3
State Labor	Bill Wood	3,952	6.6	+6.6
Total formal votes		60,331	97.1	
Informal votes		1,822	2.9	
Turnout		62,153	95.7	
Two-party-preferred result
United Australia	Sir Frederick Stewart	39,624	65.7	−4.1
Labor	Albert Rowe	20,707	34.3	+4.1
United Australia hold		Swing	−4.1	

=== Reid ===
1940 Australian federal election: Reid
Party	Candidate	Votes	%	±%
Labor (N-C)	Joe Gander	18,677	31.9	+31.9
Labor	Charles Morgan	17,601	30.0	−30.3
Ind. United Australia	Leslie Brown	15,472	26.4	+26.4
State Labor	Jack Hughes	6,211	10.6	+10.6
Independent	Edward James	614	1.0	+1.0
Total formal votes		58,575	96.0	
Informal votes		2,452	4.0	
Turnout		61,027	95.8	
Two-party-preferred result
Labor	Charles Morgan	30,436	52.0	−8.3
Labor (N-C)	Joe Gander	28,139	48.0	+48.0
Labor hold		Swing	−8.3	

=== Richmond ===
1940 Australian federal election: Richmond
Party	Candidate	Votes	%	±%
Country	Larry Anthony	34,311	64.9	−5.7
Labor	Jim Fredericks	16,380	31.0	+1.7
State Labor	Alexander Collingridge	2,146	4.1	+4.1
Total formal votes		52,837	98.8	
Informal votes		647	1.2	
Turnout		53,484	94.2	
Two-party-preferred result
Country	Larry Anthony		66.9	−3.7
Labor	Jim Fredericks		32.1	+3.7
Country hold		Swing	−3.7	

=== Riverina ===
1940 Australian federal election: Riverina
Party	Candidate	Votes	%	±%
Country	Horace Nock	12,355	26.6	−7.3
Labor	Joe Langtry	10,083	21.7	−18.6
Defence Movement	John Hogan	7,571	16.3	+16.3
Country	Hugh Roberton	7,199	15.5	+15.5
Labor (N-C)	William Quirk	6,724	14.5	+14.5
Independent	Ronald Cuttle	1,408	3.0	+3.0
State Labor	Charles Lenon	1,177	2.5	+2.5
Total formal votes		46,517	95.4	
Informal votes		2,261	4.6	
Turnout		48,778	92.6	
Two-party-preferred result
Labor	Joe Langtry	23,980	51.6	+8.8
Country	Horace Nock	22,537	48.4	−8.8
Labor gain from Country		Swing	+8.8	

=== Robertson ===
1940 Australian federal election: Robertson
Party	Candidate	Votes	%	±%
Labor	Thomas Williams	17,712	33.2	−11.0
United Australia	Eric Spooner	14,809	27.8	+27.8
United Australia	Sydney Gardner	9,142	17.1	+0.3
Labor (N-C)	Michael McKeon	4,735	8.9	+8.9
State Labor	James Russell	3,503	6.6	+6.6
Independent	William Cox	1,640	3.1	+3.1
United Australia	Campbell Marshall	1,617	3.0	+3.0
Independent	Edward Down	161	0.3	+0.3
Total formal votes		53,319	95.1	
Informal votes		2,763	4.9	
Turnout		56,082	95.2	
Two-party-preferred result
United Australia	Eric Spooner	26,845	50.3	−2.8
Labor	Thomas Williams	26,474	49.7	+2.8
United Australia hold		Swing	−2.8	

=== Warringah ===
1940 Australian federal election: Warringah
Party	Candidate	Votes	%	±%
United Australia	Percy Spender	43,759	68.8	+29.2
Labor	Bessie Frewin	7,012	11.0	−3.0
State Labor	Arthur Warren	6,697	10.5	+10.5
Defence Movement	Patrick Esplin	3,399	5.3	+5.3
United Australia	Joseph Hamlet	2,752	4.3	+4.3
Total formal votes		63,619	97.7	
Informal votes		1,494	2.3	
Turnout		65,113	94.3	
Two-party-preferred result
United Australia	Percy Spender		75.5	+23.6
Labor	Bessie Frewin		24.5	+24.5
United Australia gain from Independent		Swing	+23.6	

=== Watson ===
1940 Australian federal election: Watson
Party	Candidate	Votes	%	±%
United Australia	John Jennings	27,586	45.0	−8.8
Labor	Max Falstein	21,101	34.5	−11.7
Labor (N-C)	Cecil Irwin	6,693	10.9	+10.9
State Labor	Richard Wilson	5,868	9.6	+9.6
Total formal votes		61,248	97.9	
Informal votes		1,290	2.1	
Turnout		62,538	94.7	
Two-party-preferred result
Labor	Max Falstein	31,831	52.0	+5.8
United Australia	John Jennings	29,417	48.0	−5.8
Labor gain from United Australia		Swing	+5.8	

=== Wentworth ===
1940 Australian federal election: Wentworth
Party	Candidate	Votes	%	±%
United Australia	Eric Harrison	26,969	43.0	−1.8
Labor	Norman Smith	14,500	23.1	−9.5
United Australia	Norman Cowper	13,099	20.9	+20.9
State Labor	Jim Morley	6,249	10.0	+10.0
United Australia	Richard Stranger	1,062	1.7	+1.7
Ind. Nationalist	George McDonald	771	1.2	+1.2
Total formal votes		62,650	96.7	
Informal votes		2,139	3.3	
Turnout		64,789	94.5	
Two-party-preferred result
United Australia	Eric Harrison	41,218	65.8	−1.6
Labor	Norman Smith	21,432	34.2	+1.6
United Australia hold		Swing	−1.6	

=== Werriwa ===
1940 Australian federal election: Werriwa
Party	Candidate	Votes	%	±%
Labor	Bert Lazzarini	24,766	41.5	−13.8
United Australia	Charles Hardwick	7,954	13.3	−9.3
State Labor	Rex Connor	7,512	12.6	+12.6
Labor (N-C)	Con Quilkey	6,301	10.6	+10.6
United Australia	Walter Duncan	6,010	10.1	+10.1
United Australia	Lyell Scott	4,170	7.0	+7.0
United Australia	Joseph Worland	2,278	3.8	+3.8
United Australia	Mont Sheppard	731	1.2	+1.2
Total formal votes		59,722	94.8	
Informal votes		3,277	5.2	
Turnout		62,999	94.3	
Two-party-preferred result
Labor	Bert Lazzarini		65.1	+9.8
United Australia	Charles Hardwick		34.9	−9.8
Labor hold		Swing	+9.8	

=== West Sydney ===
1940 Australian federal election: West Sydney
Party	Candidate	Votes	%	±%
Labor (N-C)	Jack Beasley	30,570	62.8	+62.8
Labor	Henry Mulcahy	10,714	22.0	−78.0
Independent	Malinda Ivey	2,937	6.0	+6.0
Independent	Stan Moran	2,470	5.1	+5.1
State Labor	Peter Burke	1,983	4.1	+4.1
Total formal votes		48,674	94.9	
Informal votes		2,610	5.1	
Turnout		51,284	92.7	
Two-party-preferred result
Labor (N-C)	Jack Beasley		64.3	+64.3
Labor	Henry Mulcahy		35.7	−64.3
Labor (N-C) gain from Labor		Swing	+64.3	

== Victoria ==
=== Balaclava ===
1940 Australian federal election: Balaclava
Party	Candidate	Votes	%	±%
United Australia	Thomas White	43,876	64.0	+5.9
Labor	Charles Sandford	17,135	25.0	+3.2
Independent	Harry Moffat	7,586	11.1	+11.1
Total formal votes		68,597	98.5	
Informal votes		1,047	1.5	
Turnout		69,644	95.0	
Two-party-preferred result
United Australia	Thomas White		68.6	+1.5
Labor	Charles Sandford		31.4	−1.5
United Australia hold		Swing	+1.5	

=== Ballarat ===
1940 Australian federal election: Ballaarat
Party	Candidate	Votes	%	±%
Labor	Reg Pollard	22,715	47.8	−2.8
United Australia	Edward Montgomery	19,089	40.1	−9.3
Independent	Alex Russell	5,749	12.1	+12.1
Total formal votes		47,553	99.0	
Informal votes		488	1.0	
Turnout		48,041	96.8	
Two-party-preferred result
Labor	Reg Pollard	23,917	50.3	−0.3
United Australia	Edward Montgomery	23,636	49.7	+0.3
Labor hold		Swing	−0.3	

=== Batman ===
1940 Australian federal election: Batman
Party	Candidate	Votes	%	±%
Labor	Frank Brennan	35,636	59.7	−3.7
United Australia	Albert Peters	24,082	40.3	+3.7
Total formal votes		59,718	98.2	
Informal votes		1,080	1.8	
Turnout		60,798	96.4	
Labor hold		Swing	−3.7	

=== Bendigo ===
1940 Australian federal election: Bendigo
Party	Candidate	Votes	%	±%
Country	George Rankin	22,561	49.3	+17.7
Labor	Bert de Grandi	17,453	38.1	−1.4
Independent Country	John Barton	5,769	12.6	+12.6
Total formal votes		45,783	98.6	
Informal votes		631	1.4	
Turnout		46,414	95.6	
Two-party-preferred result
Country	George Rankin	26,314	57.5	+0.6
Labor	Bert de Grandi	19,469	42.5	−0.6
Country hold		Swing	+0.6	

=== Bourke ===
1940 Australian federal election: Bourke
Party	Candidate	Votes	%	±%
Labor	Maurice Blackburn	39,736	66.2	−1.9
United Australia	Charles Lucas	20,278	33.8	+1.9
Total formal votes		60,014	97.8	
Informal votes		1,364	2.2	
Turnout		61,378	95.2	
Labor hold		Swing	−1.9	

=== Corangamite ===
1940 Australian federal election: Corangamite
Party	Candidate	Votes	%	±%
United Australia	Allan McDonald	26,665	56.2	+2.3
Labor	Harold Miller	20,801	43.8	−2.3
Total formal votes		47,466	99.2	
Informal votes		371	0.8	
Turnout		47,837	95.7	
United Australia hold		Swing	+2.3	

=== Corio ===
1940 Australian federal election: Corio
Party	Candidate	Votes	%	±%
Labor	John Dedman	28,056	52.6	+9.1
United Australia	Gerald Patterson	21,271	39.9	−16.6
Independent	Harry Lyall	4,033	7.6	+7.6
Total formal votes		53,360	99.1	
Informal votes		501	0.9	
Turnout		53,861	96.6	
Two-party-preferred result
Labor	John Dedman		56.4	+12.9
United Australia	Gerald Patterson		43.6	−12.9
Labor hold		Swing	+12.9	

=== Deakin ===
1940 Australian federal election: Deakin
Party	Candidate	Votes	%	±%
United Australia	William Hutchinson	29,318	54.8	−4.9
Labor	Frank Williamson	17,267	32.3	−8.0
Independent	Frank Fisher	3,983	7.4	+7.4
Independent	Dunean McCallum	2,969	5.5	+5.5
Total formal votes		53,537	98.3	
Informal votes		911	1.7	
Turnout		54,448	95.0	
Two-party-preferred result
United Australia	William Hutchinson		62.2	+2.5
Labor	Frank Williamson		37.8	−2.5
United Australia hold		Swing	+2.5	

=== Fawkner ===
1940 Australian federal election: Fawkner
Party	Candidate	Votes	%	±%
United Australia	Harold Holt	38,387	60.8	−5.7
Labor	Arthur Fraser	22,558	35.8	+7.4
Independent	Alexander Mills	2,152	3.4	+3.4
Total formal votes		63,097	98.0	
Informal votes		1,293	2.0	
Turnout		64,390	93.9	
Two-party-preferred result
United Australia	Harold Holt		62.5	+0.1
Labor	Arthur Fraser		37.5	−0.1
United Australia hold		Swing	+0.1	

=== Flinders ===
1940 Australian federal election: Flinders
Party	Candidate	Votes	%	±%
United Australia	Rupert Ryan	22,154	39.7	−13.3
Labor	Frank Lee	15,465	27.7	+27.7
Independent	Edward Mann	14,920	26.7	+26.7
Independent	Alexander Amess	3,245	5.8	+5.8
Total formal votes		55,784	98.3	
Informal votes		946	1.7	
Turnout		56,730	95.9	
Two-party-preferred result
United Australia	Rupert Ryan	32,591	58.4	−3.3
Labor	Frank Lee	23,193	41.6	+3.3
United Australia hold		Swing	−3.3	

=== Gippsland ===
1940 Australian federal election: Gippsland
Party	Candidate	Votes	%	±%
Country	Thomas Paterson	20,547	42.8	−1.6
Labor	James McKenna	16,082	33.5	−5.4
Country	George Bowden	8,006	16.7	+16.7
Independent	Calvert Wyeth	3,402	7.1	+7.1
Total formal votes		48,037	98.5	
Informal votes		708	1.5	
Turnout		48,745	96.0	
Two-party-preferred result
Country	Thomas Paterson	27,257	56.7	−4.4
Labor	James McKenna	20,780	43.3	+4.4
Country hold		Swing	−4.4	

=== Henty ===
1940 Australian federal election: Henty
Party	Candidate	Votes	%	±%
Independent	Arthur Coles	35,542	54.6	+54.6
Labor	Arthur Haywood	23,319	35.8	+3.3
Independent	Eric Young	4,927	7.6	+7.6
Independent	Samuel Thomas	704	1.1	+1.1
Independent	Edward Riley	567	0.9	+0.9
Total formal votes		65,059	97.9	
Informal votes		1,368	2.1	
Turnout		66,427	96.7	
Two-party-preferred result
Independent	Arthur Coles		63.5	+63.5
Labor	Arthur Haywood		36.5	−3.2
Independent gain from United Australia		Swing	+3.2	

=== Indi ===
1940 Australian federal election: Indi
Party	Candidate	Votes	%	±%
Country	John McEwen	30,676	61.5	+0.3
Labor	Jack Devlin	19,216	38.5	−0.3
Total formal votes		49,892	98.8	
Informal votes		608	1.2	
Turnout		50,500	95.2	
Country hold		Swing	+0.3	

=== Kooyong ===
1940 Australian federal election: Kooyong
Party	Candidate	Votes	%	±%
United Australia	Robert Menzies	44,161	62.9	+11.6
Labor	Thomas Brennan	14,467	20.6	−4.1
Independent	John Dale	7,382	10.5	+10.5
Independent	Drysdale Bett	2,598	3.7	+3.7
Independent	Frank Hartnett	1,168	1.7	+1.7
Independent	Francis Foster	377	0.5	+0.5
Total formal votes		70,153	98.3	
Informal votes		1,184	1.7	
Turnout		71,337	95.3	
Two-party-preferred result
United Australia	Robert Menzies		70.1	+12.8
Labor	Thomas Brennan		29.9	−12.8
United Australia hold		Swing	+12.8	

=== Maribyrnong ===
1940 Australian federal election: Maribyrnong
Party	Candidate	Votes	%	±%
Labor	Arthur Drakeford	40,990	64.6	+2.3
United Australia	Robert Vroland	22,455	35.4	+0.5
Total formal votes		63,445	98.3	
Informal votes		1,124	1.7	
Turnout		64,569	95.9	
Labor hold		Swing	+0.9	

=== Melbourne ===
1940 Australian federal election: Melbourne
Party	Candidate	Votes	%	±%
Labor	Arthur Calwell	28,590	51.9	−48.1
United Australia	Richard Griffiths	13,140	23.9	+23.9
Aust. Democratic Labor	James Baker	7,893	14.3	+14.3
Independent Labor	Edward Whitcombe	5,450	9.9	+9.9
Total formal votes		55,073	96.1	
Informal votes		2,254	3.9	
Turnout		57,327	95.9	
Two-party-preferred result
Labor	Arthur Calwell		71.1	−28.9
United Australia	Richard Griffiths		28.9	+28.9
Labor hold		Swing	−28.9	

=== Melbourne Ports ===
1940 Australian federal election: Melbourne Ports
Party	Candidate	Votes	%	±%
Labor	Jack Holloway	38,853	66.1	−33.9
United Australia	Raymond Trickey	19,907	33.9	+33.9
Total formal votes		58,760	97.6	
Informal votes		1,428	2.4	
Total votes		60,188	94.7	
Labor hold		Swing	−33.9	

=== Wannon ===
1940 Australian federal election: Wannon
Party	Candidate	Votes	%	±%
Labor	Don McLeod	24,533	48.6	+9.3
United Australia	Thomas Scholfield	21,271	42.2	+4.9
Independent Country	John Crawford	2,490	4.9	+4.9
Independent	Jabez Potts	2,164	4.3	+4.3
Total formal votes		50,458	98.8	
Informal votes		624	1.2	
Turnout		51,082	96.2	
Two-party-preferred result
Labor	Don McLeod	27,098	53.7	+5.0
United Australia	Thomas Scholfield	23,360	46.3	−5.0
Labor gain from United Australia		Swing	+5.0	

=== Wimmera ===
1940 Australian federal election: Wimmera
Party	Candidate	Votes	%	±%
Independent	Alexander Wilson	19,915	44.0	−7.9
Country	Hugh McClelland	12,561	27.8	−20.3
Labor	Michael Nolan	11,222	24.8	+24.8
Independent	Robert Johnstone	1,523	3.4	+3.4
Total formal votes		45,221	98.6	
Informal votes		636	1.4	
Turnout		45,857	96.2	
Two-party-preferred result
Independent	Alexander Wilson	29,918	66.2	+14.3
Country	Hugh McClelland	15,303	33.8	−14.3
Independent hold		Swing	+14.3	

=== Yarra ===
1940 Australian federal election: Yarra
Party	Candidate	Votes	%	±%
Labor	James Scullin	32,790	57.4	−6.6
United Australia	Fred Edmunds	19,132	33.5	−2.5
Independent	Ralph Gibson	5,175	9.1	+9.1
Total formal votes		57,097	97.0	
Informal votes		1,756	3.0	
Turnout		58,853	94.9	
Two-party-preferred result
Labor	James Scullin		65.6	+1.6
United Australia	Fred Edmunds		34.4	−1.6
Labor hold		Swing	+1.6	

== Queensland ==
=== Brisbane ===
1940 Australian federal election: Brisbane
Party	Candidate	Votes	%	±%
Labor	George Lawson	27,474	50.4	−1.1
United Australia	John Fletcher	27,055	49.6	+5.3
Total formal votes		54,529	97.5	
Informal votes		1,396	2.5	
Turnout		55,925	92.7	
Labor hold		Swing	−3.2	

=== Capricornia ===
1940 Australian federal election: Capricornia
Party	Candidate	Votes	%	±%
Labor	Frank Forde	33,211	58.7	+8.3
Country	Edwin Hiskens	23,330	41.3	+3.3
Total formal votes		56,541	98.7	
Informal votes		733	1.3	
Turnout		57,274	94.7	
Labor hold		Swing	+2.5	

=== Darling Downs ===
1940 Australian federal election: Darling Downs
Party	Candidate	Votes	%	±%
Country	Arthur Fadden	29,365	57.9	−2.8
Labor	Leslie Bailey	21,316	42.1	+8.0
Total formal votes		50,681	98.7	
Informal votes		675	1.3	
Turnout		51,356	97.0	
Country hold		Swing	−5.4	

=== Griffith ===
1940 Australian federal election: Griffith
Party	Candidate	Votes	%	±%
Labor	William Conelan	30,529	50.5	+2.2
United Australia	Peter McCowan	29,879	49.5	+8.3
Total formal votes		60,408	97.8	
Informal votes		1,347	2.2	
Turnout		61,755	96.4	
Labor hold		Swing	+0.2	

=== Herbert ===
1940 Australian federal election: Herbert
Party	Candidate	Votes	%	±%
Labor	George Martens	24,712	40.7	−2.9
Country	Thomas Mann	21,545	35.5	+6.3
Independent	Fred Paterson	11,104	18.3	+18.3
Independent RSL	Louis Haydon	3,346	5.5	+5.5
Total formal votes		60,707	96.3	
Informal votes		2,365	3.7	
Turnout		63,072	92.3	
Two-party-preferred result
Labor	George Martens	34,261	56.4	−10.0
Country	Thomas Mann	26,446	43.6	+10.0
Labor hold		Swing	−10.0	

=== Kennedy ===
1940 Australian federal election: Kennedy
Party	Candidate	Votes	%	±%
Labor	Bill Riordan	29,988	64.2	+0.2
Country	Wilfrid Simmonds	16,706	35.8	+4.6
Total formal votes		46,694	97.5	
Informal votes		1,209	2.5	
Turnout		47,903	88.7	
Labor hold		Swing	−2.2	

=== Lilley ===
1940 Australian federal election: Lilley
Party	Candidate	Votes	%	±%
United Australia	William Jolly	35,047	58.1	+1.5
Labor	Gordon Lovell	23,485	38.9	+0.9
Independent	Charles Mitchell	1,800	3.0	+3.0
Total formal votes		60,332	97.7	
Informal votes		1,399	2.3	
Turnout		61,731	95.9	
Two-party-preferred result
United Australia	William Jolly		59.6	−0.7
Labor	Gordon Lovell		40.4	+0.7
United Australia hold		Swing	−0.7	

=== Maranoa ===
1940 Australian federal election: Maranoa
Party	Candidate	Votes	%	±%
Labor	Frank Baker	24,105	47.9	+6.5
Country	Bob McGeoch	22,452	44.6	−3.8
Independent	Henry Madden	3,808	7.6	+7.6
Total formal votes		50,365	98.2	
Informal votes		939	1.8	
Turnout		51,304	90.3	
Two-party-preferred result
Labor	Frank Baker	25,987	51.6	+5.9
Country	Bob McGeoch	24,378	48.4	−5.9
Labor gain from Country		Swing	+5.9	

=== Moreton ===
1940 Australian federal election: Moreton
Party	Candidate	Votes	%	±%
United Australia	Josiah Francis	36,265	59.3	+4.0
Labor	Henry Herbert	24,938	40.7	+3.7
Total formal votes		61,203	98.0	
Informal votes		1,268	2.0	
Turnout		62,471	95.8	
United Australia hold		Swing	+0.2	

=== Wide Bay ===
1940 Australian federal election: Wide Bay
Party	Candidate	Votes	%	±%
Country	Bernard Corser	28,693	54.9	+17.1
Labor	Samuel Round	15,305	29.3	+6.7
Protestant Labour	John Rex	8,300	15.9	+15.9
Total formal votes		52,298	98.5	
Informal votes		825	1.5	
Turnout		53,123	94.7	
Two-party-preferred result
Country	Bernard Corser		58.9	+8.4
Labor	Samuel Round		41.1	+41.1
Country hold		Swing	+8.4	

== South Australia ==
=== Adelaide ===
1940 Australian federal election: Adelaide
Party	Candidate	Votes	%	±%
United Australia	Fred Stacey	29,393	50.0	+4.7
Labor	Edgar Dawes	19,950	33.9	−20.8
Aust. Democratic Labor	Raymond Davis	4,906	8.3	+8.3
Independent Labor	Bert Edwards	4,587	7.8	+7.8
Total formal votes		58,836	95.0	
Informal votes		3,090	5.0	
Turnout		61,926	95.0	
Two-party-preferred result
United Australia	Fred Stacey		54.7	+0.7
Labor	Edgar Dawes		45.3	−0.7
United Australia hold		Swing	+0.7	

=== Barker ===
1940 Australian federal election: Barker
Party	Candidate	Votes	%	±%
Country	Archie Cameron	34,649	58.6	−5.0
Labor	Cecil Skitch	15,786	26.7	+26.7
Independent	Charles Lloyd	8,659	14.7	−21.7
Total formal votes		59,094	96.9	
Informal votes		1,861	3.1	
Turnout		60,955	96.0	
Two-party-preferred result
Country	Archie Cameron		65.9	+2.3
Labor	Cecil Skitch		34.1	−2.3
Country hold		Swing	+2.3	

=== Boothby ===
1940 Australian federal election: Boothby
Party	Candidate	Votes	%	±%
United Australia	John Price	37,219	57.4	+5.5
Labor	Edwin Yates	18,131	28.0	−5.0
Independent	William Adey	9,479	14.6	+14.6
Total formal votes		64,829	96.6	
Informal votes		2,279	3.4	
Turnout		67,108	95.0	
Two-party-preferred result
United Australia	John Price		65.2	+5.0
Labor	Edwin Yates		34.8	−5.0
United Australia hold		Swing	+5.0	

=== Grey ===
1940 Australian federal election: Grey
Party	Candidate	Votes	%	±%
Country	Oliver Badman	25,683	52.8	+0.8
Labor	Charles Davis	18,178	37.4	−0.4
Independent	Percy McFarlane	4,790	9.8	+9.8
Total formal votes		48,651	96.9	
Informal votes		1,580	3.1	
Turnout		50,231	96.6	
Two-party-preferred result
Country	Oliver Badman		57.7	+0.6
Labor	Charles Davis		42.3	−0.6
Country hold		Swing	+0.6	

=== Hindmarsh ===
1940 Australian federal election: Hindmarsh
Party	Candidate	Votes	%	±%
Labor	Norman Makin	41,718	65.7	−5.0
United Australia	Harry Hatwell	21,758	34.3	+5.0
Total formal votes		63,476	96.2	
Informal votes		2,530	3.8	
Turnout		66,006	95.6	
Labor hold		Swing	−5.0	

=== Wakefield ===
1940 Australian federal election: Wakefield
Party	Candidate	Votes	%	±%
United Australia	Jack Duncan-Hughes	27,357	53.4	−10.0
Labor	Sydney McHugh	23,870	46.6	+10.0
Total formal votes		51,227	97.1	
Informal votes		1,547	2.9	
Turnout		52,774	96.3	
United Australia gain from Labor		Swing	−10.0	

== Western Australia ==
=== Forrest ===
1940 Australian federal election: Forrest
Party	Candidate	Votes	%	±%
Country	John Prowse	24,619	55.4	+1.0
Labor	Vane Green	19,832	44.6	−1.0
Total formal votes		44,451	97.7	
Informal votes		1,053	2.3	
Turnout		45,504	94.1	
Country hold		Swing	+1.0	

=== Fremantle ===
1940 Australian federal election: Fremantle
Party	Candidate	Votes	%	±%
Labor	John Curtin	27,299	48.0	−7.2
United Australia	Frederick Lee	26,274	46.2	+5.3
Ind. United Australia	Gil Clarke	3,344	5.9	+5.9
Total formal votes		56,917	97.4	
Informal votes		1,499	2.6	
Turnout		58,416	94.7	
Two-party-preferred result
Labor	John Curtin	28,779	50.6	−6.6
United Australia	Frederick Lee	28,138	49.4	+6.6
Labor hold		Swing	−0.5	

=== Kalgoorlie ===
1940 Australian federal election: Kalgoorlie
Party	Candidate	Votes	%	±%
Labor	Albert Green	unopposed		
Labor hold		Swing		

=== Perth ===
1940 Australian federal election: Perth
Party	Candidate	Votes	%	±%
United Australia	Walter Nairn	33,999	62.4	+2.4
Labor	Gavan McMillan	17,144	31.5	−2.6
Independent	James Bolitho	3,326	6.1	+6.1
Total formal votes		54,469	96.9	
Informal votes		1,738	3.1	
Turnout		56,207	93.5	
Two-party-preferred result
United Australia	Walter Nairn		64.5	+4.2
Labor	Gavan McMillan		35.5	−4.2
United Australia hold		Swing	+4.2	

=== Swan ===
1940 Australian federal election: Swan
Party	Candidate	Votes	%	±%
Country	Henry Gregory	15,997	34.2	+5.1
Labor	Jim Dinan	13,193	28.2	−13.7
Country	Thomas Marwick	8,800	18.8	+18.8
Independent	Claude Barker	7,758	16.6	+16.6
British Israel	John Tregenza	986	2.1	+2.1
Total formal votes		46,734	95.8	
Informal votes		2,073	4.2	
Turnout		48,807	92.4	
Two-party-preferred result
Country	Henry Gregory	26,855	57.5	−0.6
Labor	Jim Dinan	19,879	42.5	+0.6
Country hold		Swing	−0.6	

== Tasmania ==
=== Bass ===
1940 Australian federal election: Bass
Party	Candidate	Votes	%	±%
Labor	Claude Barnard	12,009	49.4	−1.0
United Australia	Algie Findlay	5,634	23.2	+5.6
United Australia	Desmond Oldham	5,215	21.5	+21.5
Independent	John Watson	1,452	6.0	−4.5
Total formal votes		24,310	96.8	
Informal votes		813	3.2	
Turnout		25,123	95.4	
Two-party-preferred result
Labor	Claude Barnard		54.2	−1.5
United Australia	Algie Findlay		45.8	+1.5
Labor hold		Swing	−1.5	

=== Darwin ===
1940 Australian federal election: Darwin
Party	Candidate	Votes	%	±%
United Australia	George Bell	15,896	59.2	+6.7
Labor	Eric Reece	10,961	40.8	−6.7
Total formal votes		26,857	97.4	
Informal votes		707	2.6	
Turnout		27,564	94.0	
United Australia hold		Swing	+6.7	

=== Denison ===
1940 Australian federal election: Denison
Party	Candidate	Votes	%	±%
United Australia	Arthur Beck	12,969	51.1	+9.8
Labor	Gerald Mahoney	12,433	48.9	+1.4
Total formal votes		25,402	96.7	
Informal votes		880	3.3	
Turnout		26,282	93.0	
United Australia gain from Labor		Swing	+5.0	

=== Franklin ===
1940 Australian federal election: Franklin
Party	Candidate	Votes	%	±%
Labor	Charles Frost	14,322	53.5	−4.5
United Australia	Hugh Warner	12,466	46.5	+4.5
Total formal votes		26,788	96.7	
Informal votes		913	3.3	
Turnout		27,701	96.0	
Labor hold		Swing	−4.5	

=== Wilmot ===
1940 Australian federal election: Wilmot
Party	Candidate	Votes	%	±%
Labor	Lancelot Spurr	10,113	43.4	−3.4
United Australia	Allan Guy	8,301	35.6	+3.5
United Australia	Frank Edwards	4,913	21.1	+21.1
Total formal votes		23,327	96.7	
Informal votes		789	3.3	
Turnout		24,116	95.6	
Two-party-preferred result
United Australia	Allan Guy	12,841	55.0	−0.1
Labor	Lancelot Spurr	10,486	45.0	+0.1
United Australia gain from Labor		Swing	−0.1	

== Northern Territory ==
=== Northern Territory ===
1940 Australian federal election: Northern Territory
Party	Candidate	Votes	%	±%
Independent	Adair Blain	1,622	38.9	+0.7
Labor	Lindsay Craig	1,321	31.6	−4.9
Independent	Fred Colson	841	20.1	+20.1
Independent Labor	John McDonald	391	9.4	+9.4
Total formal votes		4,175	97.9	
Informal votes		88	2.1	
Turnout		4,263	74.3	
Two-party-preferred result
Independent	Adair Blain	2,579	61.8	+9.8
Labor	Lindsay Craig	1,596	38.2	−9.8
Independent hold		Swing	+9.8	

== See also ==
- Candidates of the 1940 Australian federal election
- Members of the Australian House of Representatives, 1940–1943
