= Electoral results for the Division of Reid =

Australian division election results

This is a list of electoral results for the Division of Reid in Australian federal elections from the electorate's creation in 1922 until the present.

== Members ==
| Member | Party | Term |
|---|---|---|
| Percy Coleman | Labor | 1922–1931 |
| Joe Gander | Labor (NSW) | 1931–1936 |
| Joe Gander | Labor | 1936–1940 |
| Joe Gander | Labor (N-C) | 1940 |
| Charles Morgan | Labor | 1940–1946 |
| Jack Lang | Lang Labor | 1946–1949 |
| Charles Morgan | Labor | 1949–1958 |
| Charles Morgan | Independent | 1958 |
| Tom Uren | Labor | 1958–1990 |
| Laurie Ferguson | Labor | 1990–2010 |
| John Murphy | Labor | 2010–2013 |
| Craig Laundy | Liberal | 2013–2019 |
| Fiona Martin | Liberal | 2019–2022 |
| Sally Sitou | Labor | 2022–present |

== Election results ==
=== Elections in the 2020s ===
==== 2025 ====
2025 Australian federal election: Reid
| Party | Candidate | Votes | % | ±% |
|---|---|---|---|---|
| Greens | Joanna Somerville | | | |
| Liberal | Grange Chung | | | |
| Trumpet of Patriots | David Sarikaya | | | |
| One Nation | Gina Ingrouille | | | |
| Labor | Sally Sitou | | | |
| Libertarian | Clinton Mead | | | |
| Independent | Steven Commerford | | | |
| Total formal votes | | | | |
| Informal votes | | | | |
| Turnout | | | | |

==== 2022 ====
2022 Australian federal election: Reid
| Party | Candidate | Votes | % | ±% |
|---|---|---|---|---|
| Labor | Sally Sitou | 40,768 | 41.61 | +4.40 |
| Liberal | Fiona Martin | 37,126 | 37.89 | −10.43 |
| Greens | Charles Jago | 9,184 | 9.37 | +1.29 |
| Independent | Natalie Baini | 2,994 | 3.06 | +3.06 |
| United Australia | Jamal Daoud | 2,530 | 2.58 | +0.66 |
| One Nation | Edward Walters | 1,997 | 2.04 | +2.04 |
| Liberal Democrats | Andrew Cameron | 1,824 | 1.86 | +1.86 |
| Fusion | Sahar Khalili-Naghadeh | 1,553 | 1.59 | +1.59 |
| Total formal votes | | 97,976 | 93.51 | −0.36 |
| Informal votes | | 6,800 | 6.49 | +0.36 |
| Turnout | | 104,776 | 90.68 | −1.03 |
Two-party-preferred result
| Labor | Sally Sitou | 54,076 | 55.19 | +8.37 |
| Liberal | Fiona Martin | 43,900 | 44.81 | −8.37 |
| Labor gain from Liberal | | Swing | +8.37 | |

Alluvial diagram for preference flows in the seat of Reid in the 2022 federal election. indicates at what stage the winning candidate had over 50% of the votes and was declared the winner.

=== Elections in the 2010s ===
==== 2019 ====
2019 Australian federal election: Reid
| Party | Candidate | Votes | % | ±% |
|---|---|---|---|---|
| Liberal | Fiona Martin | 45,288 | 48.32 | −0.48 |
| Labor | Sam Crosby | 34,872 | 37.21 | +0.88 |
| Greens | Charles Jago | 7,575 | 8.08 | −0.39 |
| Christian Democrats | Keith Piper | 2,335 | 2.49 | −1.61 |
| Animal Justice | Rohan Laxmanalal | 1,861 | 1.99 | +1.99 |
| United Australia | Young Lee | 1,797 | 1.92 | +1.92 |
| Total formal votes | | 93,728 | 93.87 | −1.15 |
| Informal votes | | 6,119 | 6.13 | +1.15 |
| Turnout | | 99,847 | 91.71 | +1.30 |
Two-party-preferred result
| Liberal | Fiona Martin | 49,844 | 53.18 | −1.51 |
| Labor | Sam Crosby | 43,884 | 46.82 | +1.51 |
| Liberal hold | | Swing | −1.51 | |

==== 2016 ====
2016 Australian federal election: Reid
| Party | Candidate | Votes | % | ±% |
|---|---|---|---|---|
| Liberal | Craig Laundy | 44,212 | 48.80 | −0.62 |
| Labor | Angelo Tsirekas | 32,918 | 36.33 | −1.31 |
| Greens | Alice Mantel | 7,673 | 8.47 | +0.75 |
| Christian Democrats | Ju Kang | 3,713 | 4.10 | +2.49 |
| Family First | Marylou Carter | 2,081 | 2.30 | +2.30 |
| Total formal votes | | 90,597 | 95.02 | +3.67 |
| Informal votes | | 4,748 | 4.98 | −3.67 |
| Turnout | | 95,345 | 90.41 | −0.80 |
Two-party-preferred result
| Liberal | Craig Laundy | 49,543 | 54.69 | +1.36 |
| Labor | Angelo Tsirekas | 41,054 | 45.31 | −1.36 |
| Liberal hold | | Swing | +1.36 | |

==== 2013 ====
2013 Australian federal election: Reid
| Party | Candidate | Votes | % | ±% |
|---|---|---|---|---|
| Liberal | Craig Laundy | 40,430 | 47.11 | +4.00 |
| Labor | John Murphy | 34,817 | 40.57 | −0.94 |
| Greens | Pauline Tyrrell | 5,968 | 6.95 | −4.23 |
| Palmer United | Mohammed Ashraf | 1,298 | 1.51 | +1.51 |
| Christian Democrats | Bill Shailer | 1,219 | 1.42 | −1.65 |
| Australian Independents | Raymond Palmer | 1,215 | 1.42 | +1.42 |
| Democratic Labour | Emily Dunn | 580 | 0.68 | +0.68 |
| Katter's Australian | Bishrul Izadeen | 297 | 0.35 | +0.35 |
| Total formal votes | | 85,824 | 90.51 | −0.69 |
| Informal votes | | 9,003 | 9.49 | +0.69 |
| Turnout | | 94,827 | 91.42 | +0.36 |
Two-party-preferred result
| Liberal | Craig Laundy | 43,642 | 50.85 | +3.53 |
| Labor | John Murphy | 42,182 | 49.15 | −3.53 |
| Liberal gain from Labor | | Swing | +3.53 | |

==== 2010 ====
2010 Australian federal election: Reid
| Party | Candidate | Votes | % | ±% |
|---|---|---|---|---|
| Liberal | Peter Cooper | 34,328 | 43.11 | +7.42 |
| Labor | John Murphy | 33,051 | 41.51 | −11.35 |
| Greens | Adam Butler | 8,903 | 11.18 | +3.27 |
| Christian Democrats | Bill Shailer | 2,445 | 3.07 | +0.76 |
| Socialist Equality | Carolyn Kennett | 901 | 1.13 | +1.13 |
| Total formal votes | | 79,628 | 91.20 | −3.22 |
| Informal votes | | 7,680 | 8.80 | +3.22 |
| Turnout | | 87,308 | 91.07 | −2.07 |
Two-party-preferred result
| Labor | John Murphy | 41,949 | 52.68 | −8.16 |
| Liberal | Peter Cooper | 37,679 | 47.32 | +8.16 |
| Labor hold | | Swing | −8.16 | |

=== Elections in the 2000s ===
==== 2007 ====
2007 Australian federal election: Reid
| Party | Candidate | Votes | % | ±% |
|---|---|---|---|---|
| Labor | Laurie Ferguson | 47,739 | 60.10 | +9.26 |
| Liberal | Ronney Oueik | 21,516 | 27.09 | −4.98 |
| Greens | Mark Lipscombe | 4,160 | 5.24 | −0.33 |
| Christian Democrats | Alex Sharah | 3,170 | 3.99 | +0.88 |
| Family First | Veronica Lambert | 1,301 | 1.64 | +1.42 |
| Democrats | Silma Ihram | 1,123 | 1.41 | +0.16 |
| Citizens Electoral Council | Hal Johnson | 429 | 0.54 | +0.54 |
| Total formal votes | | 79,438 | 92.43 | +3.77 |
| Informal votes | | 6,508 | 7.57 | −3.77 |
| Turnout | | 85,946 | 92.77 | +1.12 |
Two-party-preferred result
| Labor | Laurie Ferguson | 53,065 | 66.80 | +4.72 |
| Liberal | Ronney Oueik | 26,373 | 33.20 | −4.72 |
| Labor hold | | Swing | +4.72 | |

==== 2004 ====
2004 Australian federal election: Reid
| Party | Candidate | Votes | % | ±% |
|---|---|---|---|---|
| Labor | Laurie Ferguson | 33,052 | 51.37 | −5.72 |
| Liberal | Sarah McMahon | 19,796 | 30.76 | +8.28 |
| Greens | Wafaa Salti | 3,376 | 5.25 | +2.24 |
| No GST | Nicholas Khoury | 3,084 | 4.79 | +4.79 |
| Christian Democrats | Kylie Laurence | 2,296 | 3.57 | +1.22 |
| One Nation | Neville Williams | 1,267 | 1.97 | −3.47 |
| Democrats | Tony Yoo | 802 | 1.25 | −2.17 |
| Socialist Alliance | Lisa Macdonald | 673 | 1.05 | +1.05 |
| Total formal votes | | 64,346 | 88.29 | −0.63 |
| Informal votes | | 8,537 | 11.71 | +0.63 |
| Turnout | | 72,883 | 92.95 | −0.33 |
Two-party-preferred result
| Labor | Laurie Ferguson | 40,388 | 62.77 | −4.10 |
| Liberal | Sarah McMahon | 23,958 | 37.23 | +4.10 |
| Labor hold | | Swing | −4.10 | |

==== 2001 ====
2001 Australian federal election: Reid
| Party | Candidate | Votes | % | ±% |
|---|---|---|---|---|
| Labor | Laurie Ferguson | 36,474 | 57.09 | −0.96 |
| Liberal | Irfan Yusuf | 14,364 | 22.48 | +1.18 |
| One Nation | Shane O'Connor | 3,476 | 5.44 | −1.20 |
| Unity | Habib Chamas | 3,056 | 4.78 | −0.82 |
| Democrats | Adrian Archer | 2,183 | 3.42 | +0.40 |
| Greens | Steve Maxwell | 1,920 | 3.01 | +1.28 |
| Christian Democrats | Uwe Ledermann | 1,502 | 2.35 | −0.90 |
| | Lisa Macdonald | 916 | 1.43 | +1.43 |
| Total formal votes | | 63,891 | 88.92 | −4.02 |
| Informal votes | | 7,964 | 11.08 | +4.02 |
| Turnout | | 71,855 | 93.51 | |
Two-party-preferred result
| Labor | Laurie Ferguson | 42,726 | 66.87 | −5.30 |
| Liberal | Irfan Yusuf | 21,165 | 33.13 | +5.30 |
| Labor hold | | Swing | −5.30 | |

=== Elections in the 1990s ===
==== 1998 ====
1998 Australian federal election: Reid
| Party | Candidate | Votes | % | ±% |
|---|---|---|---|---|
| Labor | Laurie Ferguson | 41,162 | 57.56 | +0.41 |
| Liberal | Alma Freame | 15,637 | 21.87 | −12.67 |
| One Nation | Shane O'Connor | 4,477 | 6.26 | +6.26 |
| Unity | Penny Tongsumrith | 4,045 | 5.66 | +5.66 |
| Christian Democrats | John Ananin | 2,544 | 3.56 | +3.56 |
| Democrats | David Poularas | 2,052 | 2.87 | −4.08 |
| Greens | Jamie Thomson | 1,293 | 1.81 | +1.81 |
| Democratic Socialist | Rupen Savoulian | 302 | 0.42 | +0.42 |
| Total formal votes | | 71,512 | 92.90 | −1.75 |
| Informal votes | | 5,468 | 7.10 | +1.75 |
| Turnout | | 76,980 | 93.16 | −3.15 |
Two-party-preferred result
| Labor | Laurie Ferguson | 51,233 | 71.64 | +10.26 |
| Liberal | Alma Freame | 20,279 | 28.36 | −10.26 |
| Labor hold | | Swing | +10.26 | |

==== 1996 ====
1996 Australian federal election: Reid
| Party | Candidate | Votes | % | ±% |
|---|---|---|---|---|
| Labor | Laurie Ferguson | 40,910 | 57.15 | −7.55 |
| Liberal | Lynne McDowell | 24,720 | 34.53 | +6.63 |
| Democrats | Alfie Giuliano | 4,977 | 6.95 | +6.95 |
| Natural Law | Catherine Doric | 975 | 1.36 | +0.43 |
| Total formal votes | | 71,582 | 94.65 | −0.48 |
| Informal votes | | 4,047 | 5.35 | +0.48 |
| Turnout | | 75,629 | 96.31 | +0.77 |
Two-party-preferred result
| Labor | Laurie Ferguson | 43,837 | 61.38 | −7.42 |
| Liberal | Lynne McDowell | 27,580 | 38.62 | +7.42 |
| Labor hold | | Swing | −7.42 | |

==== 1993 ====
1993 Australian federal election: Reid
| Party | Candidate | Votes | % | ±% |
|---|---|---|---|---|
| Labor | Laurie Ferguson | 45,714 | 64.71 | +9.75 |
| Liberal | Eyup Guner | 19,711 | 27.90 | −1.43 |
| Independent | Carmel Emtage | 1,942 | 2.75 | +2.75 |
| Western Suburbs Greens | Jennifer Long | 1,524 | 2.16 | +2.16 |
| | Paul Locke | 1,098 | 1.55 | +1.55 |
| Natural Law | Stephen Doric | 660 | 0.93 | +0.93 |
| Total formal votes | | 70,749 | 95.13 | +0.42 |
| Informal votes | | 3,619 | 4.87 | −0.42 |
| Turnout | | 74,268 | 95.54 | |
Two-party-preferred result
| Labor | Laurie Ferguson | 48,579 | 68.80 | +4.05 |
| Liberal | Eyup Guner | 22,025 | 31.20 | −4.05 |
| Labor hold | | Swing | +4.05 | |

==== 1990 ====
1990 Australian federal election: Reid
| Party | Candidate | Votes | % | ±% |
|---|---|---|---|---|
| Labor | Laurie Ferguson | 34,591 | 55.8 | −2.6 |
| Liberal | Lynne McDowell | 17,016 | 27.5 | −7.1 |
| Democrats | Steven Bailey | 3,807 | 6.1 | −0.9 |
| Call to Australia | Keith Barron | 2,599 | 4.2 | +4.2 |
| Independent EFF | Vincent White | 1,765 | 2.8 | +2.8 |
| Democratic Socialist | Margaret Gleeson | 1,328 | 2.1 | +2.1 |
| New Australia | Radwan Elachi | 874 | 1.4 | +1.4 |
| Total formal votes | | 61,980 | 94.3 | |
| Informal votes | | 3,775 | 5.7 | |
| Turnout | | 65,755 | 94.6 | |
Two-party-preferred result
| Labor | Laurie Ferguson | 40,849 | 66.1 | +4.3 |
| Liberal | Lynne McDowell | 20,970 | 33.9 | −4.3 |
| Labor hold | | Swing | +4.3 | |

=== Elections in the 1980s ===
==== 1987 ====
1987 Australian federal election: Reid
| Party | Candidate | Votes | % | ±% |
|---|---|---|---|---|
| Labor | Tom Uren | 35,738 | 58.4 | −2.9 |
| Liberal | Lynne McDowell | 21,175 | 34.6 | +5.5 |
| Democrats | John Roveen | 4,274 | 7.0 | +2.1 |
| Total formal votes | | 61,187 | 93.3 | |
| Informal votes | | 5,099 | 7.7 | |
| Turnout | | 66,286 | 93.1 | |
Two-party-preferred result
| Labor | Tom Uren | 37,839 | 61.8 | −5.5 |
| Liberal | Lynne McDowell | 23,348 | 38.2 | +5.5 |
| Labor hold | | Swing | −5.5 | |

==== 1984 ====
1984 Australian federal election: Reid
| Party | Candidate | Votes | % | ±% |
|---|---|---|---|---|
| Labor | Tom Uren | 36,384 | 61.3 | +1.0 |
| Liberal | Mary-Ruth Kain | 17,269 | 29.1 | −0.2 |
| Democrats | John Roveen | 2,936 | 4.9 | −2.9 |
| Independent | Jim Saleam | 2,803 | 4.7 | +4.7 |
| Total formal votes | | 59,392 | 90.5 | |
| Informal votes | | 6,208 | 9.5 | |
| Turnout | | 65,600 | 93.6 | |
Two-party-preferred result
| Labor | Tom Uren | 39,947 | 67.3 | +1.1 |
| Liberal | Mary-Ruth Kain | 19,445 | 32.7 | −1.1 |
| Labor hold | | Swing | +1.1 | |

==== 1983 ====
1983 Australian federal election: Reid
| Party | Candidate | Votes | % | ±% |
|---|---|---|---|---|
| Labor | Tom Uren | 37,839 | 61.7 | +0.1 |
| Liberal | Yvonne Maio | 17,089 | 27.9 | −2.2 |
| Democrats | Stephen Bastian | 4,770 | 7.8 | +5.3 |
| Socialist Workers | Lynda Boland | 723 | 1.2 | +1.2 |
| Independent | Neville Gray | 646 | 1.1 | −4.7 |
| Independent | Michael Gluyas | 259 | 0.4 | +0.4 |
| Total formal votes | | 61,326 | 95.9 | |
| Informal votes | | 2,622 | 4.1 | |
| Turnout | | 63,948 | 94.1 | |
Two-party-preferred result
| Labor | Tom Uren | | 67.6 | +2.1 |
| Liberal | Yvonne Maio | | 32.4 | −2.1 |
| Labor hold | | Swing | +2.1 | |

==== 1980 ====
1980 Australian federal election: Reid
| Party | Candidate | Votes | % | ±% |
|---|---|---|---|---|
| Labor | Tom Uren | 38,675 | 61.6 | +3.1 |
| Liberal | Yvonne Maio | 18,885 | 30.1 | −2.0 |
| Independent | Neville Gray | 3,664 | 5.8 | +5.8 |
| Democrats | Paul Terrett | 1,548 | 2.5 | −6.9 |
| Total formal votes | | 62,772 | 96.5 | |
| Informal votes | | 2,300 | 3.5 | |
| Turnout | | 65,072 | 94.0 | |
Two-party-preferred result
| Labor | Tom Uren | | 65.5 | +2.8 |
| Liberal | Yvonne Maio | | 34.5 | −2.8 |
| Labor hold | | Swing | +2.8 | |

=== Elections in the 1970s ===
==== 1977 ====
1977 Australian federal election: Reid
| Party | Candidate | Votes | % | ±% |
|---|---|---|---|---|
| Labor | Tom Uren | 38,667 | 58.5 | −3.3 |
| Liberal | Terence Shanahan | 21,246 | 32.1 | −1.2 |
| Democrats | Frederick Bluck | 6,216 | 9.4 | +9.4 |
| Total formal votes | | 66,129 | 96.7 | |
| Informal votes | | 2,224 | 3.3 | |
| Turnout | | 68,353 | 95.2 | |
Two-party-preferred result
| Labor | Tom Uren | | 62.7 | +0.1 |
| Liberal | Terence Shanahan | | 37.3 | −0.1 |
| Labor hold | | Swing | +0.1 | |

==== 1975 ====
1975 Australian federal election: Reid
| Party | Candidate | Votes | % | ±% |
|---|---|---|---|---|
| Labor | Tom Uren | 33,208 | 58.9 | −9.0 |
| Liberal | Terence Shanahan | 20,414 | 36.2 | +6.5 |
| Workers | Kevin McKenna | 2,742 | 4.9 | +4.9 |
| Total formal votes | | 56,364 | 97.3 | |
| Informal votes | | 1,554 | 2.7 | |
| Turnout | | 57,918 | 95.6 | |
Two-party-preferred result
| Labor | Tom Uren | | 59.7 | −9.6 |
| Liberal | Terence Shanahan | | 40.3 | +9.6 |
| Labor hold | | Swing | −9.6 | |

==== 1974 ====
1974 Australian federal election: Reid
| Party | Candidate | Votes | % | ±% |
|---|---|---|---|---|
| Labor | Tom Uren | 38,222 | 67.9 | +1.4 |
| Liberal | Thomas Faulkner | 16,753 | 29.7 | +0.2 |
| Australia | Astrid O'Neill | 1,349 | 2.4 | +2.4 |
| Total formal votes | | 56,324 | 97.8 | |
| Informal votes | | 1,264 | 2.2 | |
| Turnout | | 57,588 | 95.6 | |
Two-party-preferred result
| Labor | Tom Uren | | 69.3 | +2.0 |
| Liberal | Thomas Faulkner | | 30.7 | −2.0 |
| Labor hold | | Swing | +2.0 | |

==== 1972 ====
1972 Australian federal election: Reid
| Party | Candidate | Votes | % | ±% |
|---|---|---|---|---|
| Labor | Tom Uren | 35,032 | 66.5 | +7.2 |
| Liberal | William Pardy | 15,527 | 29.5 | −3.6 |
| Democratic Labor | Joseph Sanders | 2,106 | 4.0 | −1.3 |
| Total formal votes | | 52,665 | 97.6 | |
| Informal votes | | 1,309 | 2.4 | |
| Turnout | | 53,974 | 95.0 | |
Two-party-preferred result
| Labor | Tom Uren | | 67.3 | +5.9 |
| Liberal | William Pardy | | 32.7 | −5.9 |
| Labor hold | | Swing | +5.9 | |

=== Elections in the 1960s ===
==== 1969 ====
1969 Australian federal election: Reid
| Party | Candidate | Votes | % | ±% |
|---|---|---|---|---|
| Labor | Tom Uren | 31,189 | 59.3 | +4.8 |
| Liberal | Stanley Hedges | 17,404 | 33.1 | −2.0 |
| Democratic Labor | Mick Carroll | 2,791 | 5.3 | −5.1 |
| Independent | Norman Hurst | 1,242 | 2.4 | +2.4 |
| Total formal votes | | 52,626 | 97.3 | |
| Informal votes | | 1,454 | 2.7 | |
| Turnout | | 54,080 | 94.9 | |
Two-party-preferred result
| Labor | Tom Uren | | 61.4 | +5.0 |
| Liberal | Stanley Hedges | | 38.6 | −5.0 |
| Labor hold | | Swing | +5.0 | |

==== 1966 ====
1966 Australian federal election: Reid
| Party | Candidate | Votes | % | ±% |
|---|---|---|---|---|
| Labor | Tom Uren | 28,645 | 51.6 | −6.7 |
| Liberal | Stanislaus Kelly | 21,089 | 38.0 | +6.3 |
| Democratic Labor | Mick Carroll | 5,764 | 10.4 | +0.4 |
| Total formal votes | | 55,498 | 95.7 | |
| Informal votes | | 2,492 | 4.3 | |
| Turnout | | 57,990 | 94.4 | |
Two-party-preferred result
| Labor | Tom Uren | | 53.5 | −6.6 |
| Liberal | Stanislaus Kelly | | 46.5 | +6.6 |
| Labor hold | | Swing | −6.6 | |

==== 1963 ====
1963 Australian federal election: Reid
| Party | Candidate | Votes | % | ±% |
|---|---|---|---|---|
| Labor | Tom Uren | 32,497 | 58.3 | −7.8 |
| Liberal | Thomas Reeves | 17,667 | 31.7 | +9.0 |
| Democratic Labor | Mick Carroll | 5,547 | 10.0 | −1.2 |
| Total formal votes | | 55,711 | 97.8 | |
| Informal votes | | 1,276 | 2.2 | |
| Turnout | | 56,987 | 95.3 | |
Two-party-preferred result
| Labor | Tom Uren | | 60.1 | −8.0 |
| Liberal | Thomas Reeves | | 39.9 | +8.0 |
| Labor hold | | Swing | −8.0 | |

==== 1961 ====
1961 Australian federal election: Reid
| Party | Candidate | Votes | % | ±% |
|---|---|---|---|---|
| Labor | Tom Uren | 34,867 | 66.1 | +17.0 |
| Liberal | Jack Cook | 11,959 | 22.7 | −3.7 |
| Democratic Labor | Mick Carroll | 5,885 | 11.2 | +8.2 |
| Total formal votes | | 52,711 | 96.8 | |
| Informal votes | | 1,743 | 3.2 | |
| Turnout | | 54,454 | 95.3 | |
Two-party-preferred result
| Labor | Tom Uren | | 68.1 | +4.0 |
| Liberal | Jack Cook | | 31.9 | −4.0 |
| Labor hold | | Swing | +4.0 | |

=== Elections in the 1950s ===
==== 1958 ====
1958 Australian federal election: Reid
| Party | Candidate | Votes | % | ±% |
|---|---|---|---|---|
| Labor | Tom Uren | 23,422 | 49.1 | −13.8 |
| Liberal | Derek Bryden | 12,597 | 26.4 | +2.8 |
| Independent | Charles Morgan | 10,201 | 21.4 | +21.4 |
| Democratic Labor | Andrew Murphy | 1,439 | 3.0 | +3.0 |
| Total formal votes | | 47,659 | 96.8 | |
| Informal votes | | 1,681 | 3.4 | |
| Turnout | | 49,340 | 95.9 | |
Two-party-preferred result
| Labor | Tom Uren | 30,539 | 64.1 | −8.8 |
| Liberal | Derek Bryden | 17,120 | 35.9 | +8.8 |
| Labor hold | | Swing | −8.8 | |

==== 1955 ====
1955 Australian federal election: Reid
| Party | Candidate | Votes | % | ±% |
|---|---|---|---|---|
| Labor | Charles Morgan | 25,959 | 62.9 | −2.1 |
| Liberal | George Walker | 9,721 | 23.6 | −2.6 |
| Communist | Jack Hughes | 3,270 | 7.9 | +3.4 |
| Independent | Charles Tubman | 2,327 | 5.6 | +5.6 |
| Total formal votes | | 41,277 | 96.1 | |
| Informal votes | | 1,673 | 3.9 | |
| Turnout | | 42,950 | 95.1 | |
Two-party-preferred result
| Labor | Charles Morgan | | 72.9 | +1.7 |
| Liberal | George Walker | | 27.1 | −1.7 |
| Labor hold | | Swing | +1.7 | |

==== 1954 ====
1954 Australian federal election: Reid
| Party | Candidate | Votes | % | ±% |
|---|---|---|---|---|
| Labor | Charles Morgan | 32,958 | 63.4 | +1.0 |
| Liberal | Bob Mutton | 13,425 | 25.8 | −7.6 |
| Official Labour Movement | Horace Hancock | 3,348 | 6.4 | +6.4 |
| Communist | Laurie Aarons | 2,285 | 4.4 | +4.4 |
| Total formal votes | | 52,016 | 98.0 | |
| Informal votes | | 1,047 | 2.0 | |
| Turnout | | 53,063 | 96.1 | |
Two-party-preferred result
| Labor | Charles Morgan | | 70.8 | +5.2 |
| Liberal | Bob Mutton | | 29.2 | −5.2 |
| Labor hold | | Swing | +5.2 | |

==== 1951 ====
1951 Australian federal election: Reid
| Party | Candidate | Votes | % | ±% |
|---|---|---|---|---|
| Labor | Charles Morgan | 28,115 | 62.4 | +4.3 |
| Liberal | Jim Clough | 15,051 | 33.4 | +4.4 |
| Independent | Rupert Sheldon | 1,903 | 4.2 | +4.2 |
| Total formal votes | | 45,069 | 98.1 | |
| Informal votes | | 895 | 1.9 | |
| Turnout | | 45,964 | 96.2 | |
Two-party-preferred result
| Labor | Charles Morgan | | 65.6 | −2.2 |
| Liberal | Jim Clough | | 34.4 | +2.2 |
| Labor hold | | Swing | −2.2 | |

=== Elections in the 1940s ===
==== 1949 ====
1949 Australian federal election: Reid
| Party | Candidate | Votes | % | ±% |
|---|---|---|---|---|
| Labor | Charles Morgan | 24,607 | 58.1 | +9.8 |
| Liberal | Jim Clough | 12,304 | 29.0 | +6.6 |
| Lang Labor | Rupert Sheldon | 5,467 | 12.9 | −13.4 |
| Total formal votes | | 42,378 | 97.8 | |
| Informal votes | | 942 | 2.2 | |
| Turnout | | 43.320 | 96.4 | |
Two-party-preferred result
| Labor | Charles Morgan | | 67.8 | |
| Liberal | Jim Clough | | 32.2 | |
| Labor hold | | Swing | | |

==== 1946 ====
1946 Australian federal election: Reid
| Party | Candidate | Votes | % | ±% |
|---|---|---|---|---|
| Labor | Charles Morgan | 29,547 | 40.7 | +5.9 |
| Lang Labor | Jack Lang | 25,049 | 34.5 | +34.5 |
| Liberal | Jeffrey Blaxland | 15,755 | 21.7 | +10.8 |
| Services | William Beckett | 2,194 | 3.0 | +3.0 |
| Total formal votes | | 72,545 | 97.6 | |
| Informal votes | | 1,805 | 2.4 | |
| Turnout | | 74,350 | 96.0 | |
Two-party-preferred result
| Lang Labor | Jack Lang | 39,316 | 54.2 | +7.4 |
| Labor | Charles Morgan | 33,229 | 45.8 | −7.4 |
| Lang Labor gain from Labor | | Swing | +7.4 | |

==== 1943 ====
1943 Australian federal election: Reid
| Party | Candidate | Votes | % | ±% |
|---|---|---|---|---|
| Lang Labor | Jack Lang | 26,532 | 41.4 | +41.4 |
| Labor | Charles Morgan | 22,313 | 34.8 | +4.8 |
| United Australia | David Knox | 6,996 | 10.9 | +10.9 |
| State Labor | Jack Hughes | 3,729 | 5.8 | −4.8 |
| Ind. United Australia | Dick George | 2,863 | 4.5 | +4.5 |
| One Parliament | Alfred Turner | 1,728 | 2.7 | +2.7 |
| Total formal votes | | 64,161 | 96.0 | |
| Informal votes | | 2,671 | 4.0 | |
| Turnout | | 66,832 | 97.4 | |
Two-party-preferred result
| Labor | Charles Morgan | 34,154 | 53.2 | +1.2 |
| Lang Labor | Jack Lang | 30,007 | 46.8 | −1.2 |
| Labor hold | | Swing | +1.2 | |

==== 1940 ====
1940 Australian federal election: Reid
| Party | Candidate | Votes | % | ±% |
|---|---|---|---|---|
| Labor (N-C) | Joe Gander | 18,677 | 31.9 | +31.9 |
| Labor | Charles Morgan | 17,601 | 30.0 | −30.3 |
| Ind. United Australia | Leslie Brown | 15,472 | 26.4 | +26.4 |
| State Labor | Jack Hughes | 6,211 | 10.6 | +10.6 |
| Independent | Edward James | 614 | 1.0 | +1.0 |
| Total formal votes | | 58,575 | 96.0 | |
| Informal votes | | 2,452 | 4.0 | |
| Turnout | | 61,027 | 95.8 | |
Two-party-preferred result
| Labor | Charles Morgan | 30,436 | 52.0 | −8.3 |
| Labor (N-C) | Joe Gander | 28,139 | 48.0 | +48.0 |
| Labor hold | | Swing | −8.3 | |

=== Elections in the 1930s ===
==== 1937 ====
1937 Australian federal election: Reid
| Party | Candidate | Votes | % | ±% |
|---|---|---|---|---|
| Labor | Joe Gander | 33,738 | 60.3 | +3.5 |
| United Australia | Reuben Jenner | 22,239 | 39.7 | +7.7 |
| Total formal votes | | 55,977 | 96.4 | |
| Informal votes | | 1,468 | 2.6 | |
| Turnout | | 57,445 | 96.8 | |
| Labor gain from Labor (NSW) | | Swing | +60.3 | |

==== 1934 ====
1934 Australian federal election: Reid
| Party | Candidate | Votes | % | ±% |
|---|---|---|---|---|
| Labor (NSW) | Joe Gander | 25,208 | 48.9 | +7.9 |
| United Australia | William Moore | 16,522 | 32.0 | +0.7 |
| Social Credit | Harry Barnes | 4,453 | 8.6 | +8.6 |
| Labor | Albert Rowe | 4,092 | 7.9 | −19.8 |
| Communist | John Terry | 1,313 | 2.5 | +2.5 |
| Total formal votes | | 51,588 | 95.3 | |
| Informal votes | | 2,565 | 4.7 | |
| Turnout | | 64,153 | 96.6 | |
Two-party-preferred result
| Labor (NSW) | Joe Gander | | 62.1 | +3.0 |
| United Australia | William Moore | | 37.9 | −3.0 |
| Labor (NSW) hold | | Swing | +3.0 | |

==== 1931 ====
1931 Australian federal election: Reid
| Party | Candidate | Votes | % | ±% |
|---|---|---|---|---|
| Labor (NSW) | Joe Gander | 26,032 | 36.9 | +36.9 |
| United Australia | Robert Uebel | 24,717 | 35.1 | +9.7 |
| Labor | Percy Coleman | 19,724 | 28.0 | −46.6 |
| Total formal votes | | 70,473 | 97.3 | |
| Informal votes | | 1,962 | 2.7 | |
| Turnout | | 72,435 | 97.7 | |
Two-party-preferred result
| Labor (NSW) | Joe Gander | 38,974 | 55.3 | +55.3 |
| United Australia | Robert Uebel | 31,499 | 44.7 | +19.3 |
| Labor (NSW) gain from Labor | | Swing | +55.3 | |

=== Elections in the 1920s ===
==== 1929 ====
1929 Australian federal election: Reid
| Party | Candidate | Votes | % | ±% |
|---|---|---|---|---|
| Labor | Percy Coleman | 49,909 | 74.6 | +8.5 |
| Nationalist | Ernest Carr | 16,977 | 25.4 | −8.5 |
| Total formal votes | | 66,886 | 97.1 | |
| Informal votes | | 1,964 | 2.9 | |
| Turnout | | 68,850 | 94.7 | |
| Labor hold | | Swing | +8.5 | |

==== 1928 ====
1928 Australian federal election: Reid
| Party | Candidate | Votes | % | ±% |
|---|---|---|---|---|
| Labor | Percy Coleman | 40,495 | 66.1 | +11.4 |
| Nationalist | George Tomlinson | 20,761 | 33.9 | −11.4 |
| Total formal votes | | 61,256 | 95.1 | |
| Informal votes | | 3,186 | 4.9 | |
| Turnout | | 64,442 | 94.4 | |
| Labor hold | | Swing | +11.4 | |

==== 1925 ====
1925 Australian federal election: Reid
| Party | Candidate | Votes | % | ±% |
|---|---|---|---|---|
| Labor | Percy Coleman | 37,027 | 54.7 | +0.2 |
| Nationalist | Percy Shortland | 22,343 | 45.3 | +5.2 |
| Total formal votes | | 49,370 | 98.1 | |
| Informal votes | | 944 | 1.9 | |
| Turnout | | 50,314 | 92.6 | |
| Labor hold | | Swing | −3.9 | |

==== 1922 ====
1922 Australian federal election: Reid
| Party | Candidate | Votes | % | ±% |
|---|---|---|---|---|
| Labor | Percy Coleman | 12,316 | 54.5 | +4.7 |
| Nationalist | Frederick Reed | 9,057 | 40.1 | −9.7 |
| Majority Labor | Howard Fowles | 1,226 | 5.4 | +5.4 |
| Total formal votes | | 22,599 | 94.9 | |
| Informal votes | | 1,214 | 5.1 | |
| Turnout | | 23,813 | 56.5 | |
Two-party-preferred result
| Labor | Percy Coleman | | 58.6 | +8.2 |
| Nationalist | Frederick Reed | | 41.4 | −8.2 |
| Labor notional hold | | Swing | +8.2 | |
