= Members of the Australian House of Representatives, 1940–1943 =

This is a list of the members of the Australian House of Representatives in the 16th Australian Parliament, which was elected at the 1940 election on 21 September 1940. The incumbent United Australia Party led by Prime Minister of Australia Robert Menzies with coalition partner the Country Party led by Archie Cameron narrowly defeated the opposition Australian Labor Party led by John Curtin and continued to hold power with the support of two independents. In October 1941 the two independents switched their support to Curtin, bringing him to power.

Member	Party	Electorate	State	In office
Joe Abbott	Country	New England	NSW	1940–1949
Larry Anthony	Country	Richmond	NSW	1937–1957
Oliver Badman	United Australia	Grey	SA	1932–1937 (S), 1937–1943
Frank Baker	Labor	Maranoa	Qld	1940–1943
Claude Barnard	Labor	Bass	Tas	1934–1949
Jack Beasley	Lang Labor/Labor	West Sydney	NSW	1928–1946
Arthur Beck	United Australia	Denison	Tas	1940–1943
George Bell	United Australia	Darwin	Tas	1919–1922, 1925–1943
Maurice Blackburn	Labor/Independent	Bourke	Vic	1934–1943
Adair Blain	Independent	Northern Territory	NT	1934–1949
John Breen	Labor	Calare	NSW	1940–1946
Frank Brennan	Labor	Batman	Vic	1911–1931, 1934–1949
Arthur Calwell	Labor	Melbourne	Vic	1940–1972
Archie Cameron	United Australia	Barker	SA	1934–1956
Ben Chifley	Labor	Macquarie	NSW	1928–1931, 1940–1951
Joe Clark	Labor	Darling	NSW	1934–1969
Arthur Coles	Independent	Henty	Vic	1940–1946
Thomas Collins	Country	Hume	NSW	1931–1943
William Conelan	Labor	Griffith	Qld	1939–1949
Bernard Corser	Country	Wide Bay	Qld	1928–1954
Rt John Curtin	Labor	Fremantle	WA	1928–1931, 1934–1945
John Dedman	Labor	Corio	Vic	1940–1949
Arthur Drakeford	Labor	Maribyrnong	Vic	1934–1955
Jack Duncan-Hughes	United Australia	Wakefield	SA	1922–1928, 1931–1938 (S), 1940–1943
H.V. Evatt	Labor	Barton	NSW	1940–1960
Arthur Fadden	Country	Darling Downs	Qld	1936–1958
Max Falstein	Labor	Watson	NSW	1940–1949
Frank Forde	Labor	Capricornia	Qld	1922–1946
Josiah Francis	United Australia	Moreton	Qld	1922–1955
Charles Frost	Labor	Franklin	Tas	1929–1931, 1934–1946
Albert Green	Labor	Kalgoorlie	WA	1922–1940
Henry Gregory	Country	Swan	WA	1913–1940
Allan Guy	United Australia	Wilmot	Tas	1929–1934, 1940–1946
Eric Harrison	United Australia	Wentworth	NSW	1931–1956
Jack Holloway	Labor	Melbourne Ports	Vic	1929–1951
Harold Holt	United Australia	Fawkner	Vic	1935–1967
Billy Hughes	United Australia	North Sydney	NSW	1901–1952
William Hutchinson	United Australia	Deakin	Vic	1931–1949
Rowley James	Labor	Hunter	NSW	1928–1958
Herbert Johnson	Labor	Kalgoorlie	WA	1940–1958
William Jolly	United Australia	Lilley	Qld	1937–1943
Joe Langtry	Labor	Riverina	NSW	1940–1949
George Lawson	Labor	Brisbane	Qld	1931–1961
Bert Lazzarini	Labor	Werriwa	NSW	1919–1931, 1934–1952
Norman Makin	Labor	Hindmarsh	SA	1919–1946, 1954–1963
Sir Charles Marr	United Australia	Parkes	NSW	1919–1929, 1931–1943
George Martens	Labor	Herbert	Qld	1928–1946
Thomas Marwick	Country	Swan	WA	1936–1937 (S), 1940–1943
William McCall	United Australia	Martin	NSW	1934–1943
Allan McDonald	United Australia	Corangamite	Vic	1940–1953
John McEwen	Country	Indi	Vic	1934–1971
Don McLeod	Labor	Wannon	Vic	1940–1949, 1951–1955
Robert Menzies	United Australia	Kooyong	Vic	1934–1966
Charles Morgan	Labor	Reid	NSW	1940–1946, 1949–1958
Dan Mulcahy	Lang Labor/Labor	Lang	NSW	1934–1953
Walter Nairn	United Australia	Perth	WA	1929–1943
Sir Earle Page	Country	Cowper	NSW	1919–1961
Thomas Paterson	Country	Gippsland	Vic	1922–1943
John Perkins	United Australia	Eden-Monaro	NSW	1926–1929, 1931–1943
Reg Pollard	Labor	Ballaarat	Vic	1937–1966
Grenfell Price	United Australia	Boothby	SA	1941–1943
John Price	United Australia	Boothby	SA	1928–1941
John Prowse	Country	Forrest	WA	1919–1943
George Rankin	Country	Bendigo	Vic	1937–1949, 1950–1956 (S)
Bill Riordan	Labor	Kennedy	Qld	1936–1966
Sol Rosevear	Lang Labor/Labor	Dalley	NSW	1931–1953
Rupert Ryan	United Australia	Flinders	Vic	1940–1952
James Scullin	Labor	Yarra	Vic	1910–1913, 1922–1949
William Scully	Labor	Gwydir	NSW	1937–1949
Tom Sheehan	Lang Labor/Labor	Cook	NSW	1937–1955
Percy Spender	United Australia	Warringah	NSW	1937–1951
Eric Spooner	United Australia	Robertson	NSW	1940–1943
Fred Stacey	United Australia	Adelaide	SA	1931–1943
Frederick Stewart	United Australia	Parramatta	NSW	1931–1946
Eddie Ward	Labor	East Sydney	NSW	1931, 1932–1963
David Oliver Watkins	Labor	Newcastle	NSW	1935–1958
Thomas White	United Australia	Balaclava	Vic	1929–1951
Alexander Wilson	Independent	Wimmera	Vic	1937–1945
