= Irfan Yusuf =

Australian social commentator and author

Irfan Yusuf (Urdu: عرفان یوسف) (born in 1969) is an Australian social commentator and author of the memoir Once Were Radicals: My years as a teenage Islamo-fascist.

== Education and work ==
Yusuf was born in Karachi, Pakistan and was raised in Sydney. His father was from Pakistan and his mother was born in India. He lived in Pakistan and the U.S. for a time, and then returned to Australia and attended St Andrew's Cathedral School in Sydney.

He graduated from Macquarie University in law and economics. He also has a Diploma of Legal Practice from the University of Technology, Sydney. He was admitted to the Supreme Court of New South Wales in 1994.

== Political activities ==
Yusuf was involved in campus politics prior to joining the Liberal Party in 1993 where he became prominent in its conservative faction. In 2005 Yusuf explained "from 1994 to 2002, I was a factional warrior for the non-Group (right-wing) faction of the NSW Liberals." He was elected to the State Council of the NSW division of the Party from 1996–2000. In 1999, he ran with other members of the Liberal Party for the Bankstown council as part of a group called "New Generation", he was unsuccessful. He was also endorsed as Liberal Party of Australia candidate for the safe Labor seat of Reid in the 2001 Australian Federal Election. He achieved a two-party preferred swing of over 5%.

=== Leaving the Liberal Party ===
He let his Liberal Party membership lapse in 2002 and in particular became critical of what he said was a takeover of the conservative faction by NSW Member of the Legislative Council David Clarke. In July 2006, in an episode of ABC's Four Corners, he joined other former Liberals in criticising the direction of the Party. He accused Clarke of being willing to exploit antisemitism and homophobia to recruit Muslims from Sydney to his party and faction, and that he had made derogatory remarks to him about Jews and homosexuals. Clarke vehemently denied Yusuf's claims, threatening legal action which never eventuated.

After a scandal involving a racist leaflet emerged during the 2007 election, Yusuf remarked on ABC's Lateline that a member expelled from the Liberal Party was perhaps affected by being "surrounded by bigots."

== Commentator and author ==
Yusuf's work has been published in 6 major newspapers and he has appeared on a number of television and radio programmes.

In an online article in September 2005, Yusuf criticised his former factional colleague Bronwyn Bishop, a prominent Liberal member of the Australian House of Representatives. Bishop had led a campaign to ban the muslim headscarf in state schools on grounds that it was inconsistent with school uniforms and it was therefore an "iconic emblem of defiance". Yusuf said the campaign was more about discouraging rebelliousness and minimising cultural diversity, and facetiously suggested that dresses were far more of a national security issue: "How do we know that these women aren't hiding bombs under their dress?". He has previously criticised what he says are Bishop's efforts to "marginalise a key faith-sector of mainstream Australia" as being "most helpful to Osama bin Ladin". Bishop denied Yusuf's claim, saying it was "stupid" and offensive." In a speech to the Australian Parliament, Bishop further responded to Yusuf's criticism, declaring that Yusuf was "known for his offensive behaviour towards women".

Since then, Yusuf has publicly campaigned against violence against women, particularly in the Muslim community.

In 2007, Yusuf received the Iremonger award by publishers Allen and Unwin, for his submission "Once were Radicals" that was published during 2009 as an autobiographical work Once Were Radicals: My years as a teenage Islamo-fascist. In 2008, he was "highly commended" by the Jesuit publication Eureka Street, for an essay on combating violence against women in Muslim-majority states.

He was a guest speaker at the Sydney Writers Festival in 2009, and a description of the event said Irfan "points the finger at mainstream extremism and hypocrisy and is a passionate (and funny) voice of moderation.
