= Charles Hardwick (judge) =

Australian barrister and judge

Charles Aubrey Hardwick CMG QC (29 July 1885 – 6 March 1984) was an Australian barrister and judge.

Hardwick was born at Rylstone to George White Hardwick and Jane, née Harris. His qualifications were a Bachelor of Arts (1913) and a Bachelor of Law (1915), both from Sydney University; he financed his way through university as a clerk in the public service. While at university he won the Pitt Cobbett Prize for Constitutional Law (1912) and sat on the Committee of the university's Law Society (1913–14, 1915–16). Called to the bar on 2 June 1915, he was employed at the Red Cross Information Bureau during the war, for which he had been considered medically unfit. On 28 October 1922 he married Maisie Jean Fell, with whom he had two sons. In 1932 he defended Francis de Groot at the trial resulting from de Groot's famous intervention in the opening of the Sydney Harbour Bridge; he successfully had de Groot released on the grounds of insanity.

Hardwick was made King's Counsel on 23 August 1934, and in 1939 was acting judge of the New South Wales Supreme Court's Matrimonial Causes Jurisdiction. He was also involved in politics as a founding member of the United Australia Party, unsuccessfully contesting preselection for the state seat of Gordon in 1937 and running as one of five endorsed UAP candidates for Werriwa at the 1940 federal election. He was also involved in the formation of the UAP's successor, the Liberal Party. Also active in charitable causes, he was a founding member of the council of the New South Wales Institute of Hospital Almoners (Treasurer, 1937–63), vice-chairman of the Metropolitan Hospital Contribution Fund (1938–44) and Director of the Prince Henry Hospital; he also held numerous positions with the Benevolent Society of New South Wales (Director 1947–58, vice-president 1958–61, president 1961–73, vice-patron 1973–84). He was appointed a Companion of the Order of St Michael and St George in 1971. He died in Sydney in 1984.
