= Tom Uren =

Australian politician (1921–2015)

The Honourable Thomas Uren AC
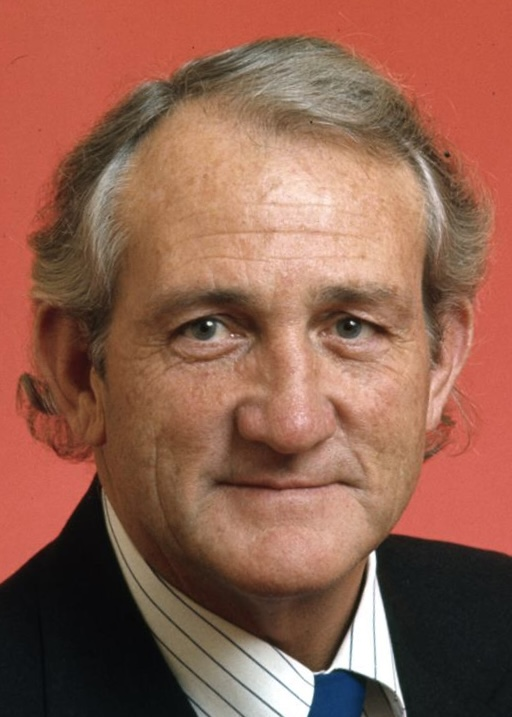

Father of the House
- In office 19 January 1984 – 19 February 1990
- Preceded by: Doug Anthony
- Succeeded by: Ian Sinclair

Minister for Local Government and Administrative Services
- In office 13 December 1984 – 24 July 1987
- Prime Minister: Bob Hawke
- Preceded by: John Brown
- Succeeded by: Clyde Holding (Local Government); Stewart West (Administrative Services)

Minister for Territories and Local Government
- In office 11 March 1983 – 13 December 1984
- Prime Minister: Bob Hawke
- Preceded by: No Immediate Predecessor
- Succeeded by: Gordon Scholes

Minister Assisting the Prime Minister for Community Development and Regional Affairs
- In office 11 March 1983 – 13 December 1984
- Prime Minister: Bob Hawke
- Preceded by: Office Established
- Succeeded by: Office Abolished

Deputy Leader of the Labor Party Deputy Leader of the Opposition
- In office 27 January 1976 – 22 December 1977
- Leader: Gough Whitlam
- Preceded by: Frank Crean
- Succeeded by: Lionel Bowen

Minister for Urban and Regional Development
- In office 19 December 1972 – 11 November 1975
- Prime Minister: Gough Whitlam
- Preceded by: Office Established
- Succeeded by: John Carrick

Member of the Australian Parliament for Reid
- In office 22 November 1958 – 19 February 1990
- Preceded by: Charles Morgan
- Succeeded by: Laurie Ferguson

Personal details
- Born: 28 May 1921 Balmain, New South Wales, Australia
- Died: 26 January 2015 (aged 93) Sydney, New South Wales, Australia
- Party: Australian Labor Party
- Spouse(s): Patricia, Christine Ann Logan
- Occupation: Boxer, soldier

Thomas Uren AC (28 May 1921 – 26 January 2015) was an Australian politician and Deputy Leader of the Australian Labor Party from 1975 to 1977. Uren served as the Member for Reid in the Australian House of Representatives from 1958 to 1990, being appointed Minister for Urban and Regional Development (1972–75), Minister for Territories and Local Government (1983–84) and Minister for Local Government and Administrative Services (1984–87). He helped establish the heritage and conservation movement in Australia and, in particular, worked to preserve the heritage of inner Sydney.

== Early life ==
Uren was born in Balmain, Sydney, then a working-class suburb, and was educated at Manly High School. Uren's family is of Cornish ancestry, having originated in Penzance. Uren played rugby league for Manly Warringah in his youth and was a strong competitive swimmer. Uren had an early career as a professional boxer, and challenged for the Australian heavyweight championship against Billy Britt.

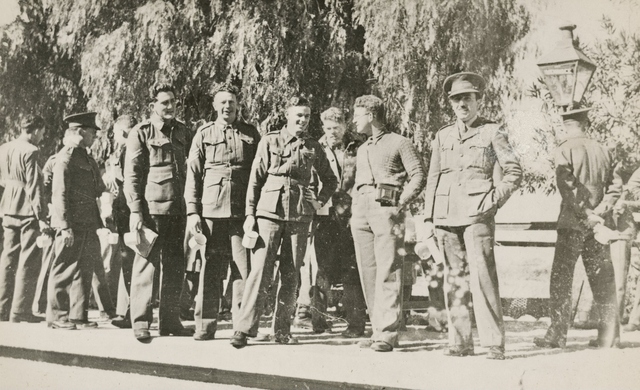
Bombardier Tom Uren (third from left, holding a tin mug and a newspaper) with some of the other members of the 2/1st Heavy Battery in 1941

In May 1939 Uren applied to join the Australian Army and was accepted shortly after the start of the Second World War in September. Serving with the Second Australian Imperial Force's 2/1st Heavy Battery he was deployed to Timor and captured during fighting in support of the Tasmanian 2/40th battalion.

A prisoner of war of the Japanese from 1942 to 1945, initially Uren was forced to work on the Burma Railway and held at the Konyu River camp, along with Edward "Weary" Dunlop. Subsequently transported to Japan in 1944 to work in smelting factories, among local workers Uren realised he did not hate the Japanese, but rather militarism. In 1945, he witnessed the sky turn crimson from the atomic bombing of Nagasaki and was discharged from service in December with the rank of Bombardier.

After the war Uren spent a short time trying to revive his boxing career which included a trip to England and Uren worked for his passage on voyages through the Panama Canal. On return, Uren worked as a Woolworths manager at Lithgow which led to his being inspired to join the Australian Labor Party after attending Ben Chifley's funeral.

Uren and his wife Patricia moved to Guildford, in Sydney's west, in the late 1940s, and established two small retailing outlets on the corner of Chetwynd Road and Hawksview Street, West Guildford to gain the financial independence to pursue a political career. Uren also built a family home nearby, before transferring from the Lithgow branch of the Labor party to the West Guildford branch in 1954.

== Political career ==
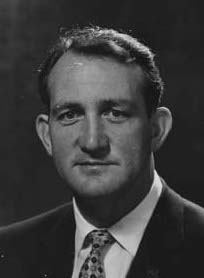
Uren in 1959.

Uren won Labor pre-selection in 1957 for the House of Representatives seat of Reid in western Sydney, which he won at the 1958 election. He represented the electorate until his retirement before the 1990 election, thirty-two years later.

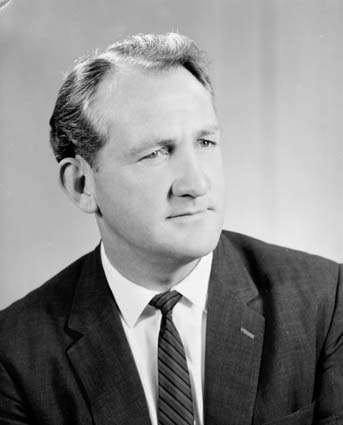
Uren in 1963.

Uren was a strong supporter of the left wing of the Labor Party, led at first by Eddie Ward and later by Jim Cairns, and was sometimes accused of being a secret communist, an accusation he denied. He campaigned against the Vietnam War, conscription and nuclear testing.

In 1969 Uren was appointed by Gough Whitlam to the Opposition front bench with responsibility for housing and urban affairs, which became Uren's passion for the rest of Uren's career. Uren was Minister for Urban and Regional Development in the Whitlam government from 1972 to 1975. He established the Australian Heritage Commission and consequent compilation of the Register of the National Estate. In Sydney, Uren promoted the restoration and re-use of derelict inner city areas such as the Glebe Estate and Woolloomooloo, the reclamation of Duck Creek and the creation of the Chipping Norton Lakes Scheme. He was a key player in the creation of the Towra Point Nature Reserve. Despite his reputation as a firebrand, Uren proved a highly competent minister and was one of the few ministers to emerge from the fall of the Whitlam government with his reputation enhanced.

In 1976 Uren was elected Deputy Leader of the Labor Party under Whitlam as Opposition Leader, but after the 1977 election, when Bill Hayden was elected Leader, Uren was replaced by Lionel Bowen. Uren succeeded Jim Cairns as leader of the ALP Left, and favoured Bob Hawke's rise to the Labor leadership. However, when the Hawke government won the 1983 election, Uren was omitted from the Cabinet—he was given the junior portfolio of Minister for Territories and Local Government and from 1984 to 1987 Local Government and Administrative Services. He became Father of the House of Representatives in 1984.

Uren stood down from the ministry after the 1987 election and retired from Parliament in 1990. He and Queensland's Clarrie Millar were the last combat veterans of World War II to serve in the House of Representatives, while Russ Gorman, a non-combat veteran, would serve until 1996. In retirement he continued to campaign for various causes, including the protection of Sydney Harbour and its foreshores. Uren opposed Australia's participation in the wars in Iraq and Afghanistan.

== Honours ==
Tom Uren in 2013

Uren was appointed an Officer of the Order of Australia (AO) in the 1993 Queen's Birthday Honours, awarded the Centenary Medal in 2001, and advanced to a Companion of the Order of Australia (AC) in the 2013 Australia Day Honours.

== Legacy ==
Uren was interviewed by Caroline Jones on her Radio National program, The Search for Meaning.

There is now a park in Iris Street, West Guildford, called "Tom Uren Park" in memory of the Labor Party local.

Uren had a strong influence on Anthony Albanese, who became the Prime Minister of Australia in May 2022. Albanese stated in June 2021 that "I grew up without a dad, but not without a father. Tom Uren was my father figure."

== Death ==
Uren died on 26 January 2015, aged 93.

== Notes ==
Political offices
New title	Minister for Urban and Regional Development; 1972–75	Succeeded by John Carrick
Preceded by Michael Hodgman; Capital Territory	Minister for Territories and Local Government; 1983–84	Succeeded by Gordon Scholes; Territories
Preceded by Kevin Newman; Administrative Services	Minister for Local Government and Administrative Services; 1984–87	Succeeded by Clyde Holding (Local Government); Stewart West (Administrative Services)
Parliament of Australia
Preceded by Charles Morgan	Member for Reid; 1958–90	Succeeded by Laurie Ferguson
Preceded by Doug Anthony	Father of the House of Representatives; 1984–90	Succeeded by Ian Sinclair
Party political offices
Preceded by Frank Crean	Deputy Leader of the Australian Labor Party; 1975–77	Succeeded by Lionel Bowen
