= Percy Coleman =

Australian politician

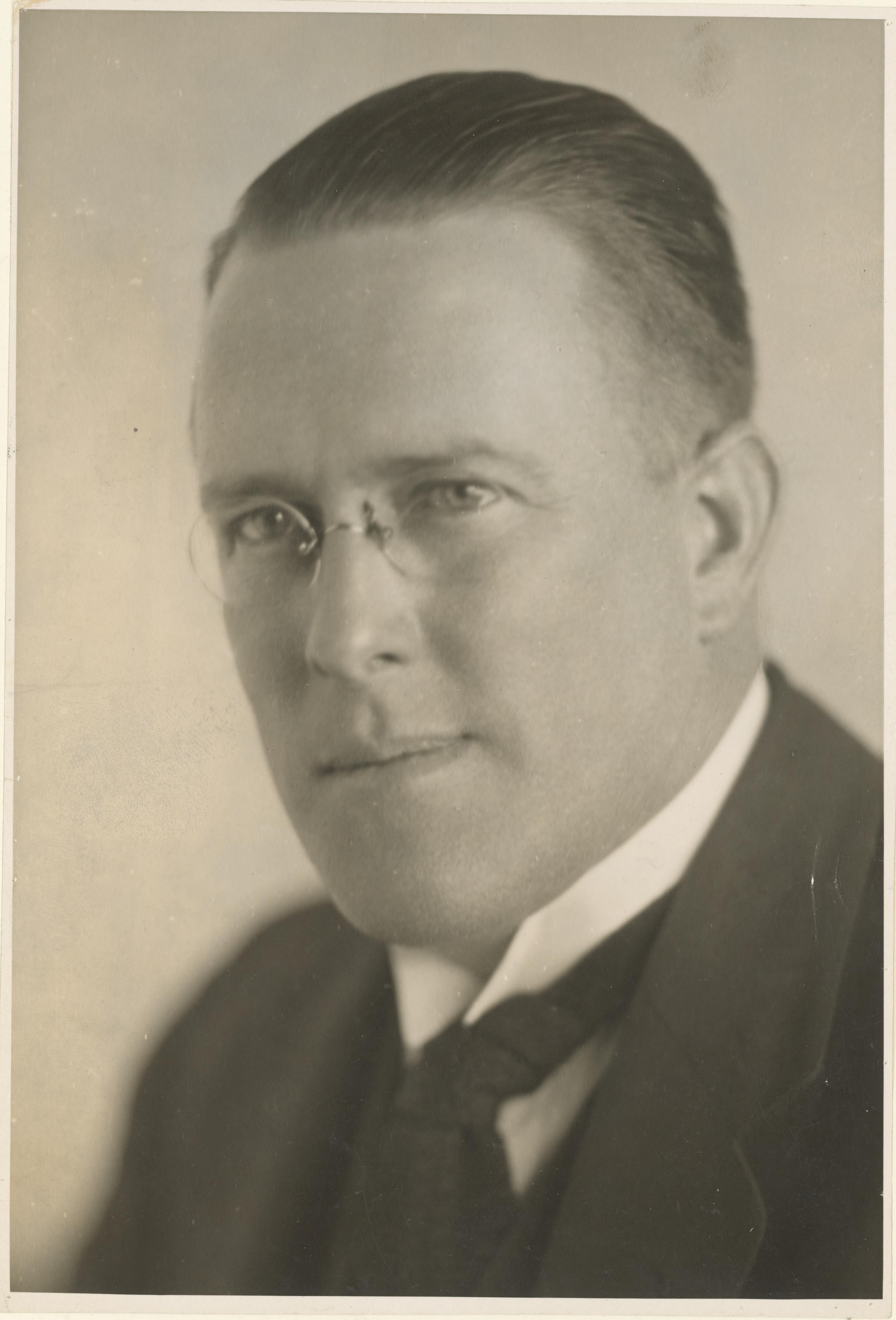
- Coleman in 1922

Member of the Australian Parliament for Reid
- In office 16 December 1922 – 19 December 1931
- Preceded by: New seat
- Succeeded by: Joe Gander

Personal details
- Born: 23 October 1892 Surry Hills, Sydney, Australia
- Died: 25 May 1934 (aged 41) Concord, Sydney, Australia
- Party: Australian Labor Party
- Spouse: Elsie Allen Victoria Prince
- Occupation: Clerk

Percy Edmund Creed Coleman (23 October 1892 – 25 May 1934) was an Australian union organiser and politician. Born in Surry Hills, Sydney to Thomas Coleman and Ellen, née Creed, Coleman was orphaned when still a young child and, after a New Zealand education, went to sea at the age of 13. After three years, he was a clerk with the Sydney branch of the Federated Seamen's Union of Australasia, and by 1916 he was general secretary of the United Clerks' Union of New South Wales.

== Military service ==
Despite his opposition to conscription, Coleman enrolled with the Australian Imperial Force in February 1918 and served with the Army Service Corps in France and England. Having been promoted to temporary sergeant by 1919, he became attached to Australia House as a lecturer. He was discharged from the armed forces in April 1920.

== Politics ==
Coleman toured the United States of America as a lecturer in 1920, and returned as secretary of the renamed Australian Clerical Association, a post he retained until 1922. He was also a founder and secretary of the Australian Alliance of Professional, Clerical and Government Employees' Associations.

Coleman's standing in the union movement led him to be selected as the Labor candidate for the new seat of Reid in 1922, an endeavour in which he was successful. He became known as a strong supporter of the League of Nations. Despite some negative publicity, during which he was called before a royal commission to testify with regard to apparent bribes made to some Labor members, Coleman easily held his seat in 1925 and 1929.

Although he did not rise to become a minister in James Scullin's government, Coleman was appointed as the Australian representative at the International Labour Conference and the League of Nations Mandates Commission meeting in Geneva, as well as the British Commonwealth Labour Conference in London. He was again embroiled in controversy when he was accused of accepting a £500 bribe during an enquiry into the broadcasting stations, but was cleared of all charges. In 1931, Coleman, who had remained loyal to Scullin's Labor, was defeated in his seat by the Lang Labor candidate, Joe Gander, and became a strong opponent of Jack Lang's "dictatorship" in New South Wales. Although he attempted to re-enter parliament via a by-election for the seat of East Sydney in 1932, he was forced to withdraw due to sickness, and was also narrowly unsuccessful in his bid to enter the New South Wales Legislative Assembly by contesting Lang's own seat of Auburn. Admitted to the bar in 1933, he became president of the New South Wales (Federal) branch of the Australian Labor Party, but died unexpectedly on 25 May 1934 while in a car at Concord. It was later determined that the cause was heart disease.

Coleman had married Elsie Allen Victoria Prince on 17 December 1921 in Sydney; he was survived by her and their daughter.

Parliament of Australia
New division	Member for Reid; 1922–1931	Succeeded by Joe Gander
