= Australian Defence Movement =

Australian political grouping in 1940

The Australian Defence Movement was a minor Australian political grouping that ran candidates for the 1940 federal election. It presented itself as a non-party organisation, dedicated to significantly increasing defence spending. The party had four candidates run unsuccessfully in New South Wales: Robert Mackie in the division of Barton, Eric Roberts in the division of Hume, John Hogan in the division of Riverina, Patrick Esplin in the division of Warringah. Following the election it challenged a number of results where it claimed candidates had exceeded the £100 campaign spending limit.
