= Joe Gander =

Australian politician

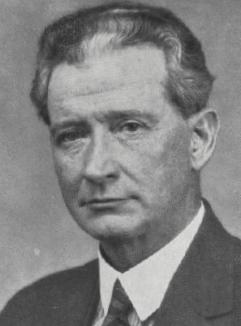

Member of the Australian Parliament for Reid
- In office 19 December 1931 – 21 September 1940
- Preceded by: Percy Coleman
- Succeeded by: Charles Morgan

Personal details
- Born: 1888 Dubbo, New South Wales
- Died: 22 November 1954 (aged 65–66) Enmore, New South Wales, Australia
- Party: Labor (NSW) (1931–36); Labor (1936–40); Labor (N-C) (1940)
- Occupation: Billiardmaker, public servant

Joseph Herbert Gander (1888 – 22 November 1954) was an Australian politician. He was a member of the Australian House of Representatives from 1931 to 1940, representing the Sydney-based seat of Reid for the first Lang Labor (1931–1936), the Australian Labor Party (1936–1940) and the second Lang Labor (1940).

Gander was born in the regional town of Dubbo and educated at Wellington Public School. Prior to entering politics, he was a billiard marker in a saloon and was a Municipality of Newtown councillor for Camden Ward from 1929 until 1931, when both Gander and fellow Jack Lang supporter Lilian Fowler lost Labor preselection to recontest their seats in the early stages of the 1931 Labor split. He was also the president of the Pony Owners' and Trainers' Association and a successful grade cricketer.

In 1931, he was elected to the Australian House of Representatives as the member for Reid for the splinter Lang Labor party, defeating incumbent Labor MP Percy Coleman. Gander was widely viewed as a "seat-warmer" for Lang should he choose to enter federal politics, but this never occurred during Gander's time in office. He was the Lang Labor whip for four years. In March 1936, Lang Labor merged back into the official Labor Party, and Gander with it. In 1940, the Labor Party split again, and Gander was among the members to join the second Lang Labor split, the Australian Labor Party (Non-Communist), resuming his old position as whip of the splinter party. However, he was defeated in the election of that year by the federal Labor candidate, Charles Morgan.

Following his political defeat, he was appointed as a federal industrial investigator to police industrial awards in August 1940. He was accepted back into the official Labor Party in 1946. He was also a successful billiards player. Gander made a late attempt to return to politics in 1953, seeking Labor preselection for a seat on the City of Sydney council.

Gander died suddenly at his home in Enmore in November 1954 and was buried at Rookwood Cemetery.

Parliament of Australia
| Preceded by Percy Coleman | Member for Reid; 1931–1940 | Succeeded by Charles Morgan |
