= Charles Morgan (Australian politician) =

Australian politician

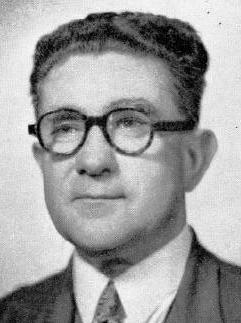

Member of the Australian Parliament for Reid
- In office 21 September 1940 – 28 September 1946
- Preceded by: Joe Gander
- Succeeded by: Jack Lang
- In office 10 December 1949 – 22 November 1958
- Preceded by: Jack Lang
- Succeeded by: Tom Uren

Personal details
- Born: 27 January 1897 Woonona, New South Wales
- Died: 27 November 1967 (aged 70)
- Party: Labor (1940–58); Independent (1958)
- Relations: Kevin Morgan (son)
- Occupation: Solicitor

Charles Albert Aaron Morgan (27 January 1897 – 27 November 1967) was an Australian politician. He was a member of the House of Representatives from 1940 to 1946 and from 1949 to 1958, representing the New South Wales seat of Reid. He was a member of the Australian Labor Party (ALP), although after being defeated for preselection before the 1958 federal election he unsuccessfully recontested his seat as an independent.

== Early life ==
Morgan was born on 27 January 1897 in Woonona, New South Wales. He grew up on the South Coast and qualified as a solicitor, establishing a practice in Wollongong and serving as a legal adviser to the Southern Miners' Federation. After seven years in Wollongong he moved to Sydney.

== Politics ==
Morgan first stood for parliament at the 1925 election, running unsuccessfully against incumbent Nationalist MP and former cabinet minister Austin Chapman. Following Chapman's death, he also stood unsuccessfully at the 1926 Eden-Monaro by-election.

Morgan was elected to the House of Representatives at the 1940 federal election, defeating the incumbent Lang Labor MP Joe Gander. He was defeated by Jack Lang at the 1946 election, but reclaimed Reid at the 1949 election after Lang opted to contest a different seat.

In December 1957, Morgan was defeated for ALP preselection by Tom Uren, losing by 226 votes to 164. He and his supporters rejected the outcome of the ballot and unsuccessfully sought the intervention of the ALP's disputes committee. On 31 October 1958, Morgan nominated as an independent candidate in Reid at the 1958 federal election, standing in opposition to Uren. He identified in his campaign announcement as a "locally endorsed Australian Labor candidate" and touted his anti-communism, promising to "oppose and resist the influence of those disruptive and extremist elements who have infiltrated into Labor branches".

Morgan was defeated by Uren at the election, polling in third place with 21% of the first-preference vote. After the election, eighteen of his supporters were expelled from the ALP for assisting his campaign.

=== Fitzpatrick-Browne case ===
In 1955, Morgan complained to the House of Representatives that his integrity and ability to perform his parliamentary duties were inhibited by claims made in the Bankstown Observer, a free newspaper circulated in his electorate. The matter was referred to the Committee of Privileges, and the proprietor of the newspaper, Raymond Fitzpatrick, and its editor, Frank Browne, were called before the Bar of the House. After hearing statements from both men, the House sentenced them to 90 days jail.

== Personal life ==
Morgan died on 27 November 1967.

Morgan's son Kevin Morgan served in the New South Wales Legislative Assembly from 1953 to 1956, during his father's term as a federal MP.

Parliament of Australia
Preceded by Joe Gander	Member for Reid; 1940–1946	Succeeded by Jack Lang
Preceded by Jack Lang	Member for Reid; 1949–1958	Succeeded by Tom Uren
