= Division of Reid =

Australian federal electoral division

Coordinates: 33.853°S 151.084°E

Reid Australian House of Representatives Division
- Interactive map of electorate boundaries from the 2025 federal election
- Created: 1922
- MP: Sally Sitou
- Party: Labor
- Namesake: Sir George Reid
- Electors: 117,857 (2025)
- Area: 49 km^{2} (18.9 sq mi)
- Demographic: Inner metropolitan
Electorates around Reid:
Parramatta	Bennelong	Bennelong
Blaxland	Reid	Sydney
Blaxland	Watson	Grayndler

The Division of Reid is an Australian electoral division in the state of New South Wales. It is on the south shore of Port Jackson, with Sydney to the east; it stretches from Silverwater to Rodd Point.

Since 2022 its MP has been Sally Sitou of the Labor Party.

== History ==
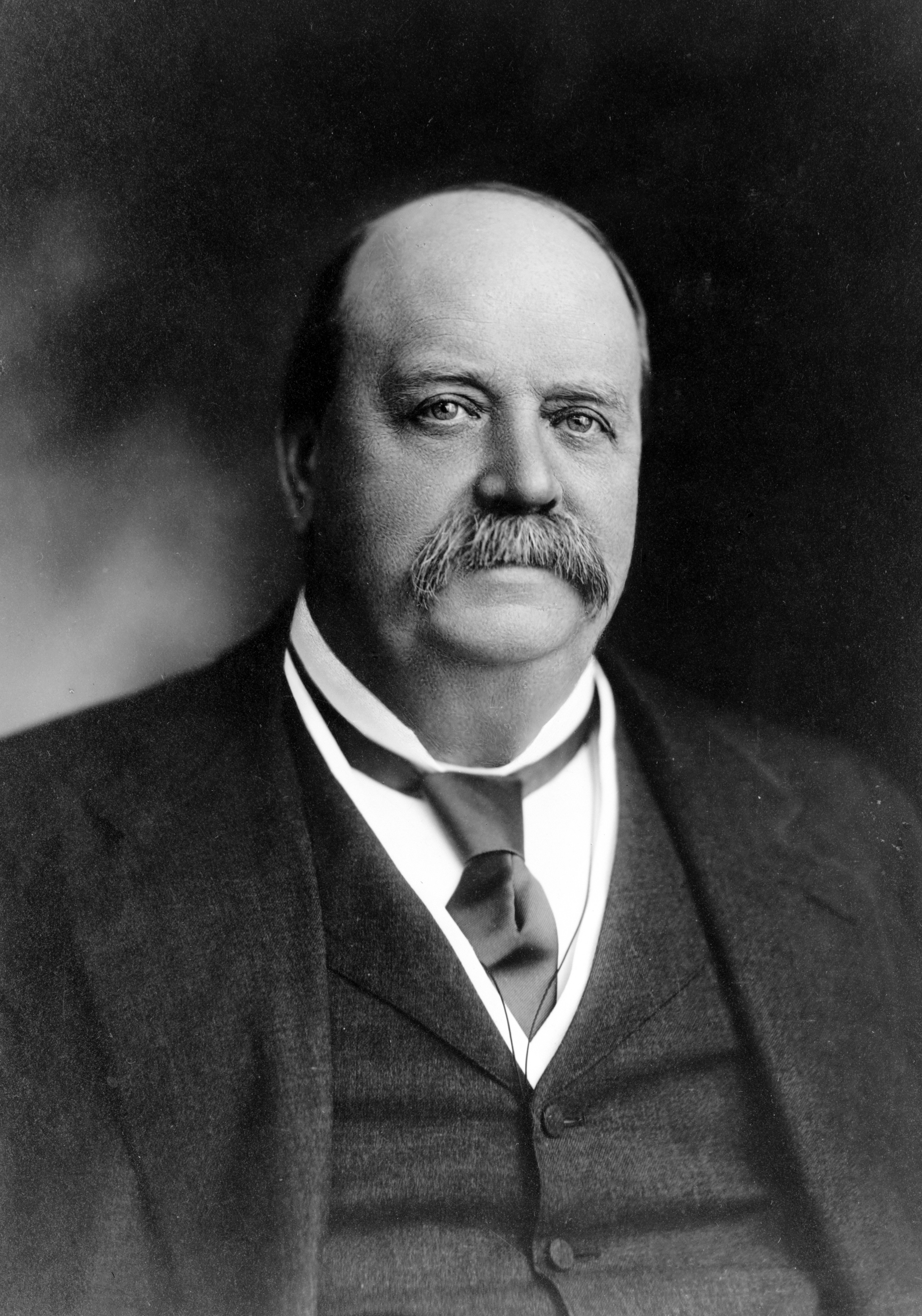
Sir George Reid, the division's namesake

The division is named after Sir George Reid, a former Premier of New South Wales and the fourth Prime Minister of Australia. The division was proclaimed at the redistribution of 13 September 1922, and was first contested at the 1922 federal election.

Under initial proposals for the 2009 redistribution, the Australian Electoral Commission proposed that the division be abolished. However, in the final proposal, the name "Reid" was retained for a division combining much of the now-abolished Division of Lowe with part of the old Division of Reid. Incidentally, the redistribution brought George Reid's old home, at Mount Royal, Strathfield, within the boundaries of the electorate that bears his name.

While the old Reid was historically a safe Labor seat, the 2009 redistribution made Reid far less safe for Labor, with its majority being slashed by six percent. That was partly because of the addition of territory from Lowe, which had been a marginal Labor seat for most of the time since the 1980s. John Murphy, the last member for Lowe, retained Reid for Labor at the 2010 election with just a two-point margin, after suffering an eight-point swing. At the 2013 election, the seat was won for the first time by the Liberal Party of Australia. The current Member for Reid, since the 2022 federal election, is Sally Sitou, a member of the Australian Labor Party. The loss of the seat to the Labor Party has been attributed to the notably large swings against the Liberal Party among Chinese Australian voters which has cost the Liberal Party many key seats, with 18% of Reid's population possessing Chinese ancestry.

Its most prominent member was Jack Lang, who served as Premier of New South Wales on two non-consecutive occasions – from 1925 to 1927, and then again from 1930 to 1932. Lang's second tenure as Premier ended in a constitutional crisis which resulted in Lang becoming the first head of government in Australia to be dismissed from office by a vice-regal representative – a case that has only happened once since, to the federal Whitlam government in 1975. Lang carried on as New South Wales Opposition Leader until 1939, and remained in the New South Wales Legislative Assembly before transferring to federal politics in 1946. Lang's sole term as member for Reid was noted for his strong opposition towards the incumbent Chifley government, though he did support efforts by the Government to nationalise private banks.

Other prominent members have included Tom Uren, who was a prominent Labor figure and minister who also served as Gough Whitlam's deputy from 1975 to 1977. Uren was succeeded upon retirement by Laurie Ferguson, the son of Jack Ferguson, who was a Deputy Premier of New South Wales, and the brother of Martin Ferguson, a former President of the Australian Council of Trade Unions and a minister in the Rudd and Gillard governments.

== Geography ==
The division is located in the inner-western suburbs of Sydney, and includes the suburbs of Abbotsford, Breakfast Point, Burwood, Cabarita, Canada Bay, Chiswick, Concord, Concord West, Five Dock, Flemington, Homebush, Homebush West, Liberty Grove, Mortlake, Newington, North Strathfield, Rhodes, Rodd Point, Russell Lea, Strathfield, Sydney Olympic Park, Wareemba, and Wentworth Point; and includes parts of Ashfield, Auburn, Croydon, Drummoyne, Lidcombe, Silverwater, and Spectacle Island.

Since 1984, federal electoral division boundaries in Australia have been determined at redistributions by a redistribution committee appointed by the Australian Electoral Commission. Redistributions occur for the boundaries of divisions in a particular state, and they occur every seven years, or sooner if a state's representation entitlement changes or when divisions of a state are malapportioned.

== Members ==
Image	Member	Party	Term	Notes
	Percy Coleman (1892–1934)	Labor	16 December 1922 – 19 December 1931	Lost seat
	Joe Gander (1888–1954)	Labor (NSW)	19 December 1931 – February 1936	Lost seat
	Joe Gander (1888–1954)	Labor	February 1936 – 2 May 1940	Lost seat
	Joe Gander (1888–1954)	Labor (Non-Communist)	2 May 1940 – 21 September 1940	Lost seat
	Charles Morgan (1897–1967)	Labor	21 September 1940 – 28 September 1946	Lost seat
	Jack Lang (1876–1975)	Lang Labor	28 September 1946 – 10 December 1949	Previously held the New South Wales Legislative Assembly seat of Auburn. Did not contest in 1949. Failed to win the Division of Blaxland
	Charles Morgan (1897–1967)	Labor	10 December 1949 – 31 October 1958	Lost preselection and then lost seat
	Charles Morgan (1897–1967)	Independent	31 October 1958 – 22 November 1958	Lost preselection and then lost seat
	Tom Uren (1921–2015)	Labor	22 November 1958 – 19 February 1990	Served as minister under Whitlam and Hawke. Retired
	Laurie Ferguson (1952–)	Labor	24 March 1990 – 21 August 2010	Previously held the New South Wales Legislative Assembly seat of Granville. Transferred to the Division of Werriwa
	John Murphy (1950–)	Labor	21 August 2010 – 7 September 2013	Previously held the Division of Lowe. Lost seat
	Craig Laundy (1971–)	Liberal	7 September 2013 – 11 April 2019	Served as minister under Turnbull and Morrison. Retired
	Fiona Martin (1977–)	Liberal	18 May 2019 – 21 May 2022	Lost seat
	Sally Sitou (1982–)	Labor	21 May 2022 – present	Incumbent

== Election results ==
2025 Australian federal election: Reid
Party	Candidate	Votes	%	±%
Labor	Sally Sitou	49,166	48.57	+6.96
Liberal	Grange Chung	32,107	31.72	−6.17
Greens	Joanna Somerville	11,680	11.54	+2.17
Independent	Steven Commerford	3,098	3.06	+3.06
One Nation	Gina Ingrouille	2,352	2.32	+0.28
Trumpet of Patriots	David Sarikaya	1,593	1.57	+1.57
Libertarian	Clinton Mead	1,221	1.21	−0.65
Total formal votes		101,217	94.03	+0.52
Informal votes		6,426	5.97	−0.52
Turnout		107,643	91.37	+0.85
Two-party-preferred result
Labor	Sally Sitou	62,762	62.01	+6.82
Liberal	Grange Chung	38,455	37.99	−6.82
Labor hold		Swing	+6.82	
