= 1940 Australian federal election =

- 21 September 1940

All 75 (Note: The Northern Territory had one seat, but members for the territories did not have full voting rights until 1966 and did not count toward government formation.) seats of the House of Representatives 38 seats were needed for a majority in the House 19 (of the 36) seats of the Senate
- Registered: 4,239,346 ▲3.90%
- Turnout: 3,979,009 (94.82%) (Note: Turnout in contested seats) (▼1.31 pp)
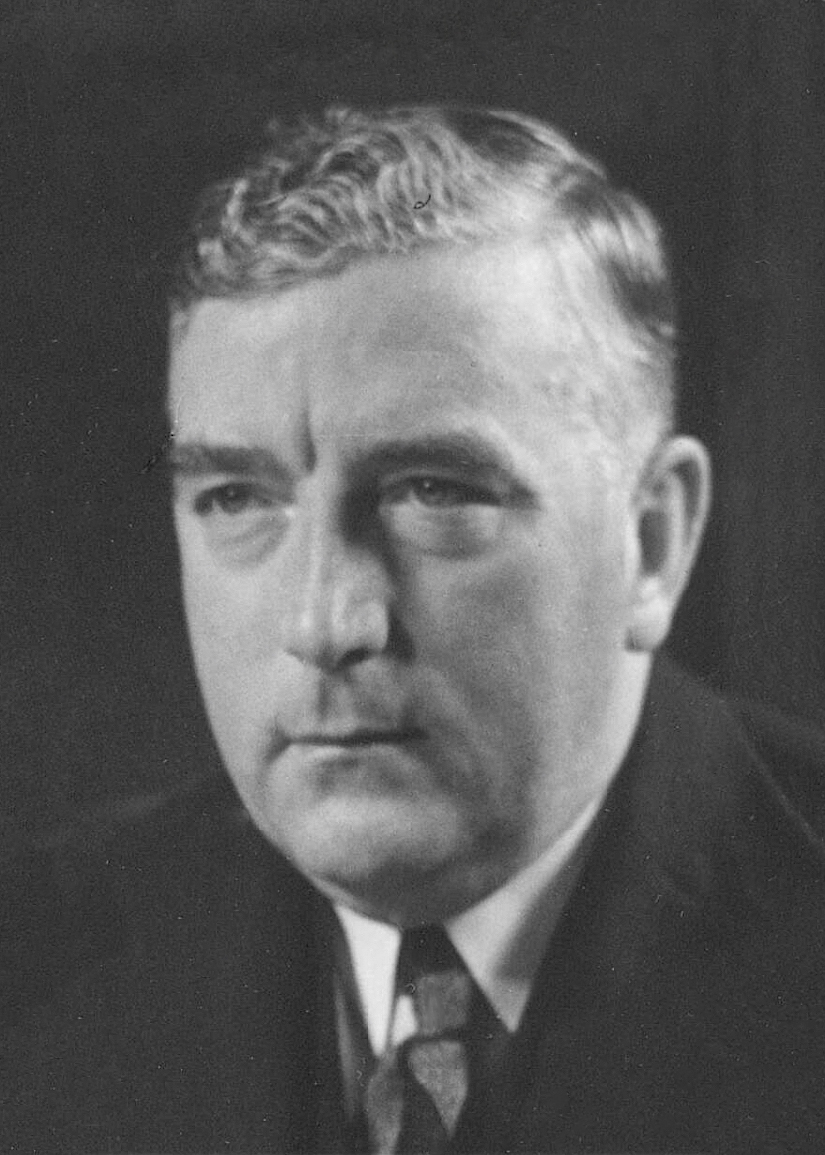

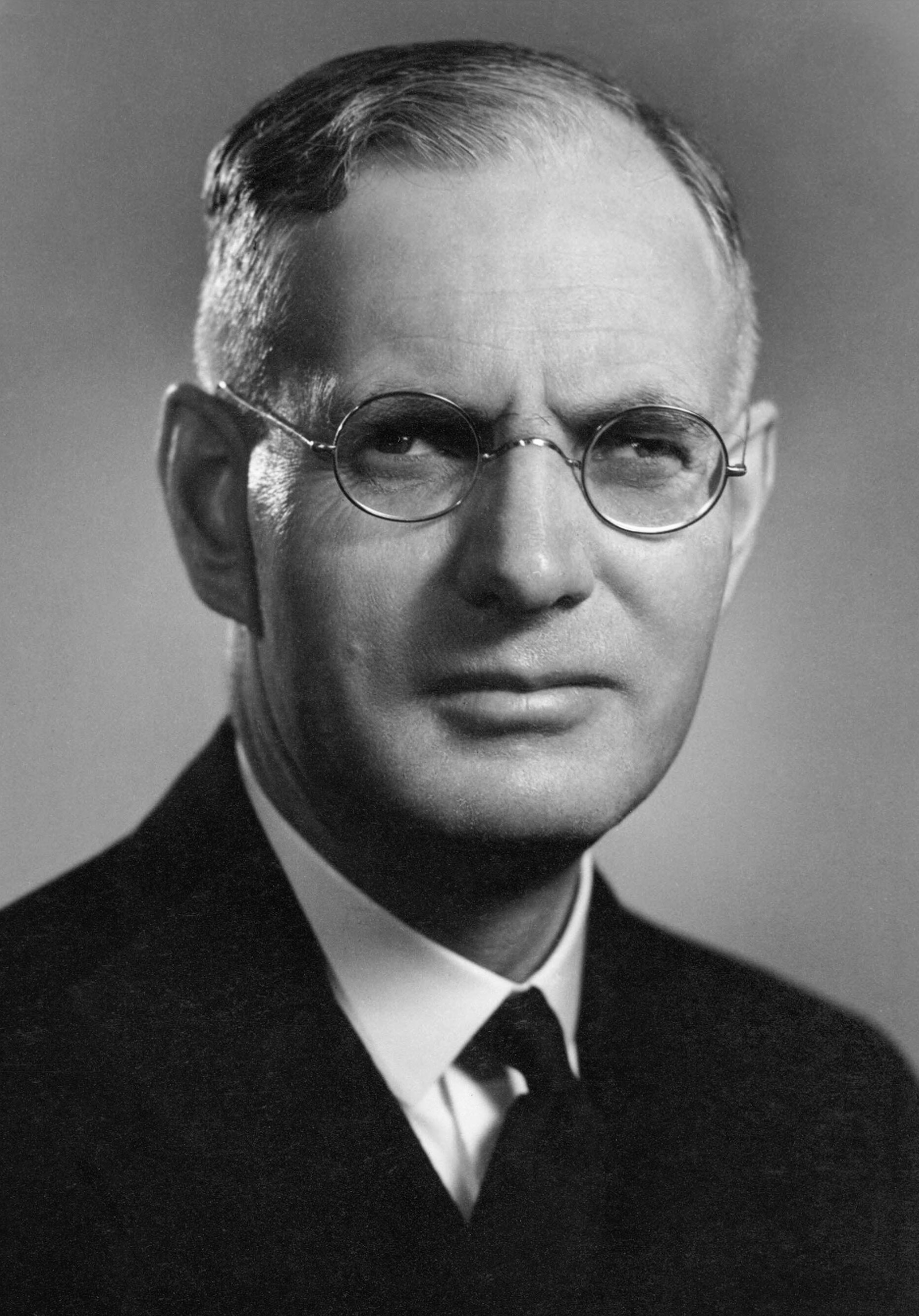

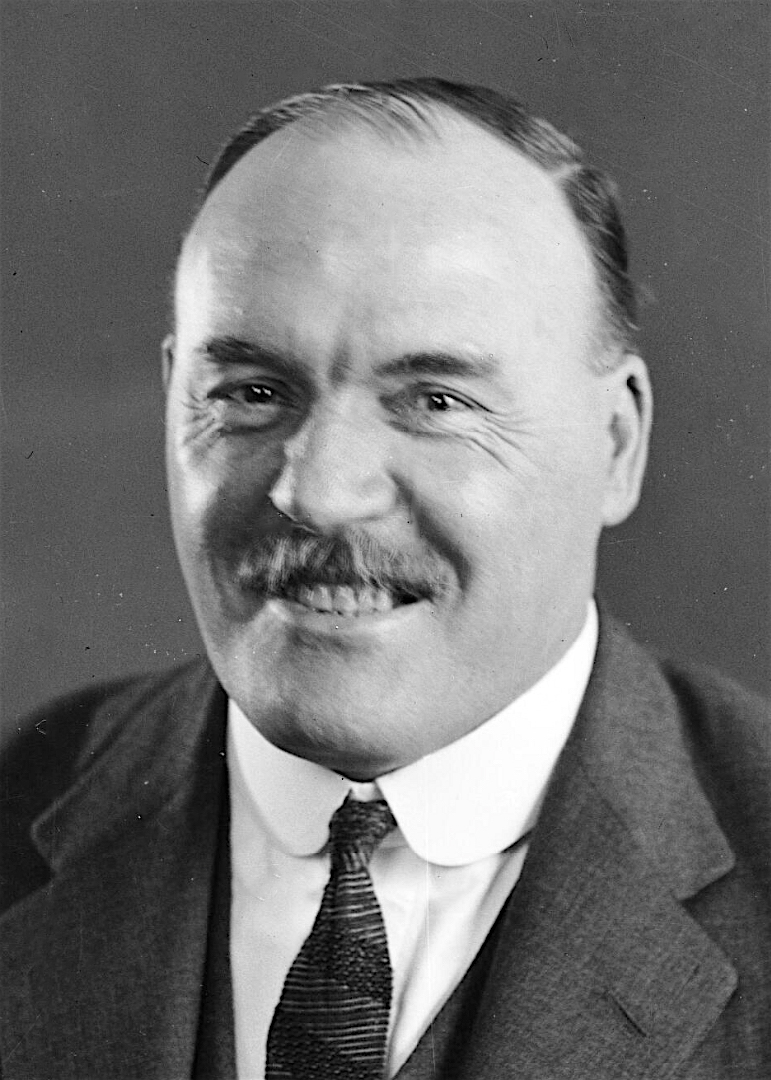
	First party	Second party
Leader	Robert Menzies	John Curtin
Party	United Australia–Country Coalition	Labor
Leader since	26 April 1939	1 October 1935
Leader's seat	Kooyong (Vic.)	Fremantle (WA)
Last election	44 seats	29 seats
Seats won	36	32
Seat change	▼8	▲3
Primary vote	1,703,185	1,556,941
Percentage	43.93%	40.16%
Swing	▼4.65	▼3.01
TPP	49.70%	50.30%
TPP swing	▼0.90	▲0.90
	Third party	Fourth party
		IND
Leader	Jack Lang	N/A
Party	Labor (Non-Communist)	Independents
Leader since		N/A
Leader's seat	Did not run	N/A
Last election	new party	3 seats
Seats won	4 seats	3 seats
Seat change	▲4	Steady
Primary vote	202,721	289,335
Percentage	5.23%	7.46%
Swing	▲0.87	▲1.90
- Results by division for the House of Representatives, shaded by winning party's margin of victory.
Prime Minister before election
Robert Menzies
UAP/Country coalition
Subsequent Prime Minister
Robert Menzies
UAP/Country coalition

A federal election was held in Australia on 21 September 1940. All 74 seats in the House of Representatives and 19 of the 36 seats in the Senate were up for election. The incumbent Coalition, consisting of the United Australia Party led by Prime Minister Robert Menzies and the Country Party led by Archie Cameron, defeated the opposition Labor Party under John Curtin despite losing the overall two-party-preferred vote.

The Coalition won 36 seats, two short of a majority, but formed a government on 28 October 1940 with the support of both independent crossbenchers, Alexander Wilson and Arthur Coles. The four MPs elected to Lang Labor's successor, the Australian Labor Party (Non-Communist), officially re-joined the ALP just months after the election in February 1941, bringing the ALP to 36 seats. The UAP–Country minority government lasted only until October 1941, when the two independents crossed the floor and allowed the ALP to form a minority government with Curtin as prime minister. It remains the only time since the 1910 introduction of the two-party system where the government has changed as the result of a parliamentary confidence vote.

Future opposition leaders H.V. Evatt and Arthur Calwell both entered parliament at this election.

== Background ==
The 15th parliament elected in the 1937 election first sat on 30 November 1937. Under the constitution, the parliament would expire in November 1940 and a general election would have to held by January 1941. Throughout 1940, there were debates on whether the general election should be held or postponed in the midst of a world war. Throughout July and August 1940, Prime Minister Robert Menzies contemplated the prospect of an early election. The loss of three Cabinet ministers in the 1940 Canberra air disaster on 13 August also meant that three by-elections would have been required, followed within a few short months by a general election.

Both the Coalition and Labor supported Australia's ongoing participation in World War II. The Coalition's advertisements asked Australians to "Cast Your Vote for Unity and an All-in War Effort / Back the Government that's Backing Churchill", with a large picture of the British Prime Minister. Labor promised "A New Deal / for the Soldier / for the Soldier's wife / Widows, the Aged and Infirm / the Taxpayer / the Working Man / the Primary Producer".

== Results ==
=== House of Representatives ===
Australian Federal Election, 1940

House of Reps (IRV) — 1940–43—Turnout 94.82% (CV) — Informal 2.56%
Party	First preference votes	%	Swing	Seats	Change
UAP–Country coalition	1,703,185	43.93	–4.65	36	–8
United Australia	1,171,788	30.22	–3.49	23	–5
Country	531,397	13.71	–1.84	13	–3
Labor	1,556,941	40.16	−3.01	32	+3
Labor (Non-Communist)	202,721	5.23	+5.23	4	+4
State Labor	101,191	2.61	+2.61	0	0
Defence Movement	15,313	0.40	+0.40	0	0
Protestant Labor	8,300	0.21	+0.21	0	0
Independents	289,335	7.46	+1.90	3 (Note: Including Northern Territory)	0
Total	3,876,986			75	
Two-party-preferred (estimated)
UAP–Country coalition		49.70	−0.90	36	−8
Labor		50.30	+0.90	32	+3

Notes

- Independents: Arthur Coles (Henty, Vic) (see below), Alexander Wilson (Wimmera, Vic)
- The Country Party in Victoria was split over membership of the Coalition, with the state party opposing its members taking office. The official United Country Party elected two members, one of whom, George Rankin, sat in the federal Country Party room and the other, Alexander Wilson, sat as an Independent. A breakaway faction, the Liberal Country Party, was formed to support sitting ministers and elected two members, John McEwen and Thomas Paterson, who both sat in the federal Country Party room.

First preference vote
Labor	40.16%
United Australia	30.22%
Country	13.71%
Lang Labor	5.23%
State Labor	2.61%
Independent/Other	8.07%

Two-party-preferred vote
Labor	50.30%
Coalition	49.70%

Parliament seats
Coalition	48.64%
Labor	43.24%
Lang Labor	5.41%
Independent	2.70%

=== Senate ===
Senate (P BV) — 1940–43—Turnout 94.75% (CV) — Informal 9.56%
Party	First preference votes	%	Swing	Seats won	Seats held	Change
UAP–Country coalition	1,831,138	50.41	+3.70	16	19	–1
UAP–Country joint ticket	1,649,241	45.40	+16.72	10	N/A	N/A
United Australia	181,897	5.01	–11.12	6	15	–1
Country	N/A	N/A	N/A	0	4	0
Labor	1,363,072	37.52	–10.96	3	17	+1
Non-Communist Labor	274,861	7.57	+7.57	0	0	0
State Labor	70,091	1.93	+1.93	0	0	0
Defence Movement	9,536	0.26	+0.26	0	0	0
Independents	84,119	2.32	–1.07	0	0	0
Total	3,632,817			19	36	

Notes

- Of the ten senators elected on UAP–Country joint tickets, seven were UAP members and three were Country Party members.

== Seats changing hands ==
Seat	Pre-1940			Swing	Post-1940		
Seat	Party	Member	Margin	Swing	Margin	Member	Party
Barton, NSW	United Australia	Albert Lane	1.8	13.9	12.1	H. V. Evatt	Labor
Calare, NSW	Country	Harold Thorby	2.2	5.6	3.4	John Breen	Labor
Cook, NSW	Labor	Tom Sheehan	N/A	33.9	13.6	Tom Sheehan	Labor (N-C)
Dalley, NSW	Labor	Sol Rosevear	N/A	14.9	7.2	Sol Rosevear	Labor (N-C)
Denison, Tas	Labor	Gerald Mahoney	3.9	5.0	1.1	Arthur Beck	United Australia
Henty, Vic	United Australia	Henry Gullett	N/A	3.2	13.5	Arthur Coles	Independent
Lang, NSW	Labor	Dan Mulcahy	N/A	13.4	16.0	Dan Mulcahy	Labor (N-C)
Macquarie, NSW	United Australia	John Lawson	2.1	10.2	8.1	Ben Chifley	Labor
Maranoa, Qld	Country	James Hunter	4.3	5.9	1.6	Frank Baker	Labor
Riverina, NSW	Country	Horace Nock	7.2	8.8	1.6	Joe Langtry	Labor
Wakefield, SA	Labor	Sydney McHugh	6.7	10.0	3.4	Jack Duncan-Hughes	United Australia
Wannon, Vic	United Australia	Thomas Scholfield	1.3	5.0	3.7	Don McLeod	Labor
Warringah, NSW	Independent	Percy Spender	1.9	23.6	25.5	Percy Spender	United Australia
Watson, NSW	United Australia	John Jennings	3.8	5.8	2.0	Max Falstein	Labor
West Sydney, NSW	Labor	Jack Beasley	100.0	64.3	14.3	Jack Beasley	Labor (N-C)
Wilmot, Tas	Labor	Lancelot Spurr	0.2	5.2	5.0	Allan Guy	United Australia

- Members listed in italics did not contest their seat at this election.

== See also ==
- Candidates of the Australian federal election, 1940
- Members of the Australian House of Representatives, 1940–1943
- Members of the Australian Senate, 1941–1944
