= Results of the 2001 Australian federal election in Queensland =

2001 Australian federal election (Queensland)
← 1998	10 November 2001	2004 →

All 27 Queensland seats in the Australian House of Representatives and 6 seats in the Australian Senate
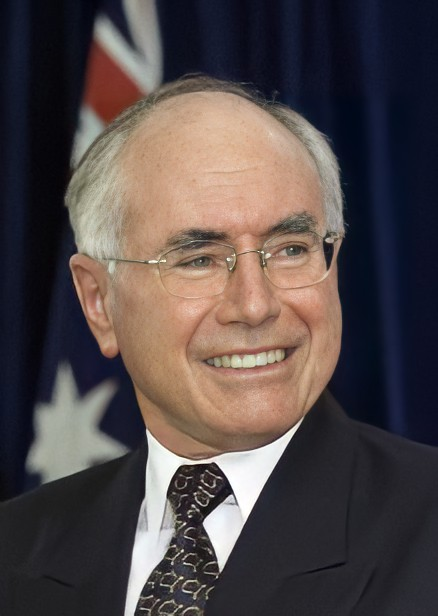

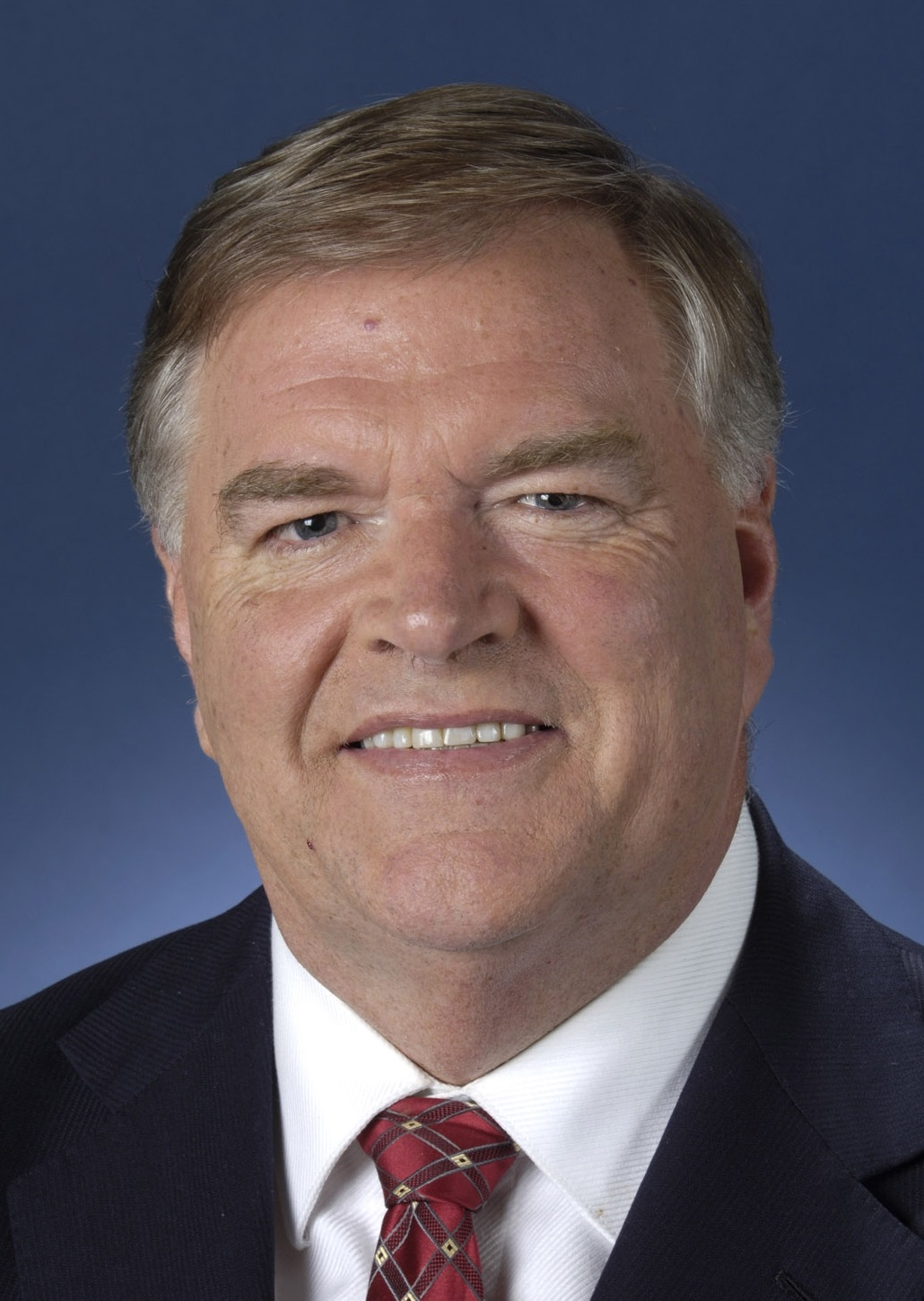
	First party	Second party
Leader	John Howard	Kim Beazley
Party	Liberal/National coalition	Labor
Last election	18 seats	8 seats
Seats won	19 seats	7 seats
Seat change	▲1	▼1
Popular vote	960,410	730,920
Percentage	45.60%	34.70%
Swing	▲4.74	▼1.40
TPP	53.05%	46.95%
TPP swing	▲1.65	▼1.65

This is a list of electoral division results for the Australian 2001 federal election in the state of Queensland.

== Overall results ==
Turnout 99.60% (CV) — Informal 3.40%
Party	Votes	%	Swing	Seats	Change
Liberal	767,959	36.46	5.60	15	▲1
National	192,451	9.14	–0.86	4	▼1
Liberal/National Coalition	960,410	45.60	+4.74	19	Steady
Labor	730,920	34.70	–1.40	7	▼1
One Nation	148,930	7.07	–7.28	0	Steady
Independent	148,620	7.06		1	▲1
Democrats	90,679	4.31	0.29		
Greens	73,467	3.49	1.11		
Citizens Electoral Council	2,849	0.14			
HEMP	1,084	0.05			
Outdoor Recreation	485	0.02			
Total	2,106,255			27	
Two-party-preferred vote
Liberal	1,110,905	53.05	+1.65	19	▲1
Labor	919,867	46.95	–1.65	7	▼1
Invalid/blank votes	106,976	4.83	+1.50		
Turnout	2,213,231	95.42			
Registered voters	2,319,481				
Source: AEC Tally Room

== Results by division ==
=== Blair ===
2001 Australian federal election: Blair
Party	Candidate	Votes	%	±%
Liberal	Cameron Thompson	31,933	45.87	+24.17
Labor	Wayne Wendt	19,397	27.86	+2.57
One Nation	Gary Turner	10,467	15.03	−20.93
Democrats	Neal McKenzie	2,284	3.28	−0.35
Greens	Phil Kyson	2,273	3.26	+1.46
Independent	Selwyn Johnston	2,131	3.06	+3.06
Independent	Dan Ryan	921	1.32	+1.32
Citizens Electoral Council	Lindsay Cosgrove	215	0.31	+0.02
Total formal votes		69,621	94.68	−1.72
Informal votes		3,909	5.32	+1.72
Turnout		73,530	96.19	
Two-party-preferred result
Liberal	Cameron Thompson	40,727	58.50	+5.10
Labor	Wayne Wendt	28,894	41.50	+41.50
Liberal hold		Swing	+5.10	

=== Bowman ===
2001 Australian federal election: Bowman
Party	Candidate	Votes	%	±%
Labor	Con Sciacca	35,213	44.44	+0.61
Liberal	Andrew Laming	34,121	43.06	+5.52
Democrats	Chad Smith	3,873	4.89	−0.52
One Nation	Barry Myatt	3,862	4.87	−6.19
Greens	Fay Smith	2,164	2.73	+0.57
Total formal votes		79,233	95.25	−2.12
Informal votes		3,954	4.75	+2.12
Turnout		83,187	96.03	
Two-party-preferred result
Labor	Con Sciacca	40,742	51.42	−1.87
Liberal	Andrew Laming	38,491	48.58	+1.87
Labor hold		Swing	−1.87	

=== Brisbane ===
2001 Australian federal election: Brisbane
Party	Candidate	Votes	%	±%
Liberal	Seb Monsour	33,704	39.32	+1.30
Labor	Arch Bevis	32,770	38.23	−6.11
Democrats	Damian Dewar	7,947	9.27	+3.20
Greens	Richard Nielsen	6,702	7.82	+3.06
One Nation	P. R. Jansen	1,878	2.19	−2.65
National	Sue Ekert	1,863	2.17	+2.17
	Ashley Lavelle	864	1.01	+1.01
Total formal votes		85,728	96.28	−0.93
Informal votes		3,315	3.72	+0.93
Turnout		89,043	93.65	
Two-party-preferred result
Labor	Arch Bevis	45,548	53.13	−1.46
Liberal	Seb Monsour	40,180	46.87	+1.46
Labor hold		Swing	−1.46	

=== Capricornia ===
2001 Australian federal election: Capricornia
Party	Candidate	Votes	%	±%
Labor	Kirsten Livermore	36,580	48.95	+1.85
National	John Lever	15,889	21.26	−11.09
Liberal	Lea Taylor	13,159	17.61	+17.61
One Nation	Herb Clarke	5,364	7.18	−6.72
Democrats	Naomi Johns	1,334	1.79	−1.23
Greens	Bob Muir	1,068	1.43	−0.35
Independent	Peter Schuback	512	0.69	−0.80
Citizens Electoral Council	Ray Gillham	476	0.64	+0.27
Independent	John Murphy	343	0.46	+0.46
Total formal votes		74,725	96.05	−1.35
Informal votes		3,070	3.95	+1.35
Turnout		77,795	96.14	
Two-party-preferred result
Labor	Kirsten Livermore	42,492	56.86	+1.57
National	John Lever	32,233	43.14	−1.57
Labor hold		Swing	+1.57	

=== Dawson ===
2001 Australian federal election: Dawson
Party	Candidate	Votes	%	±%
National	De-Anne Kelly	39,827	50.22	+8.59
Labor	Cherry Feeney	26,782	33.77	−4.25
One Nation	Rob Robinson	6,814	8.59	−7.32
Democrats	Karen Offield	2,195	2.77	+0.75
Greens	Barry Jones	1,940	2.45	+1.12
Independent	Andrew Ellul	1,050	1.32	+1.32
Citizens Electoral Council	Jan Pukallus	692	0.87	+0.87
Total formal votes		79,300	95.28	−1.94
Informal votes		3,930	4.72	+1.94
Turnout		83,230	96.06	
Two-party-preferred result
National	De-Anne Kelly	45,987	57.99	+3.57
Labor	Cherry Feeney	33,313	42.01	−3.57
National hold		Swing	+3.57	

=== Dickson ===
2001 Australian federal election: Dickson
Party	Candidate	Votes	%	±%
Liberal	Peter Dutton	36,390	45.58	+10.79
Labor	Cheryl Kernot	26,557	33.26	−7.34
Independent	Colin Kessels	5,203	6.52	+6.52
Democrats	Shayne Turner	4,296	5.38	+1.30
Greens	Paul Kramer	2,812	3.52	+1.44
One Nation	Wayne Whitney	2,575	3.23	−5.29
Independent	Terry Hyland	1,220	1.53	+1.53
Outdoor Recreation	Gary Kimlin	485	0.61	+0.61
Independent	J. F. Barnes	305	0.38	+0.38
Total formal votes		79,843	94.38	−2.12
Informal votes		4,755	5.62	+2.12
Turnout		84,598	96.51	
Two-party-preferred result
Liberal	Peter Dutton	44,688	55.97	+6.09
Labor	Cheryl Kernot	35,155	44.03	−6.09
Liberal gain from Labor		Swing	+6.09	

=== Fadden ===
2001 Australian federal election: Fadden
Party	Candidate	Votes	%	±%
Liberal	David Jull	42,856	55.80	+8.31
Labor	Ray Merlehan	23,434	30.51	−0.68
One Nation	Chris Coyle	4,897	6.38	−6.42
Democrats	Neil Cotter	3,308	4.31	−0.20
Greens	Julian Woolford	2,305	3.00	+0.96
Total formal votes		76,800	94.46	−2.15
Informal votes		4,501	5.54	+2.15
Turnout		81,301	95.07	
Two-party-preferred result
Liberal	David Jull	47,838	62.29	+4.70
Labor	Ray Merlehan	28,962	37.71	−4.70
Liberal hold		Swing	+4.70	

=== Fairfax ===
2001 Australian federal election: Fairfax
Party	Candidate	Votes	%	±%
Liberal	Alex Somlyay	35,868	47.05	+11.03
Labor	John Henderson	19,101	25.06	−3.64
Independent	Shane Paulger	7,519	9.86	+9.86
One Nation	Jim Mackellar	6,281	8.24	−9.51
Greens	Joy Ringrose	3,791	4.97	+1.50
Democrats	Karen Jackson	3,670	4.81	+0.80
Total formal votes		76,230	95.73	−0.51
Informal votes		3,399	4.27	+0.51
Turnout		79,629	95.36	
Two-party-preferred result
Liberal	Alex Somlyay	45,135	59.21	+4.85
Labor	John Henderson	31,095	40.79	−4.85
Liberal hold		Swing	+4.85	

=== Fisher ===
2001 Australian federal election: Fisher
Party	Candidate	Votes	%	±%
Liberal	Peter Slipper	40,173	51.95	+3.93
Labor	Ray O'Donnell	19,406	25.10	−2.69
Independent	Ros Hourigan	6,002	7.76	+7.76
One Nation	Bruce Tannock	5,838	7.55	−7.11
Greens	Tony McLeod	3,032	3.92	+1.24
Democrats	Geoff Armstrong	2,872	3.71	−0.19
Total formal votes		77,323	95.62	−1.33
Informal votes		3,543	4.38	+1.33
Turnout		80,866	95.68	
Two-party-preferred result
Liberal	Peter Slipper	47,988	62.06	+1.06
Labor	Ray O'Donnell	29,335	37.94	−1.06
Liberal hold		Swing	+1.06	

=== Forde ===
2001 Australian federal election: Forde
Party	Candidate	Votes	%	±%
Liberal	Kay Elson	38,263	49.67	+6.92
Labor	Val Smith	25,424	33.00	+0.34
One Nation	Alice Ngahooro	7,372	9.57	−7.53
Democrats	Alan Dickson	3,620	4.70	+0.20
Greens	Rose Clyne	2,363	3.07	+0.82
Total formal votes		77,042	94.11	−1.89
Informal votes		4,825	5.89	+1.89
Turnout		81,867	95.13	
Two-party-preferred result
Liberal	Kay Elson	44,207	57.38	+2.13
Labor	Val Smith	32,835	42.62	−2.13
Liberal hold		Swing	+2.13	

=== Griffith ===
2001 Australian federal election: Griffith
Party	Candidate	Votes	%	±%
Labor	Kevin Rudd	40,707	48.57	+4.40
Liberal	Ross Vasta	32,249	38.48	−1.79
Democrats	David Rendell	3,829	4.57	−0.36
Greens	Rob Wilson	2,671	3.19	+0.54
One Nation	Edmund McMahon	2,220	2.65	−4.33
National	Ann Graham	1,591	1.90	+1.90
	Joseph Rooke	547	0.65	+0.65
Total formal votes		83,814	95.82	−1.75
Informal votes		3,660	4.18	+1.75
Turnout		87,474	95.25	
Two-party-preferred result
Labor	Kevin Rudd	46,654	55.66	+3.23
Liberal	Ross Vasta	37,160	44.34	−3.23
Labor hold		Swing	+3.23	

=== Groom ===
2001 Australian federal election: Groom
Party	Candidate	Votes	%	±%
Liberal	Ian Macfarlane	36,573	46.86	+13.79
Labor	Leeann King	18,467	23.66	−1.57
National	Barbara Wuersching	8,563	10.97	−4.25
One Nation	David Hoy	6,958	8.92	−9.05
Greens	Michael Kane	2,774	3.55	+1.80
Democrats	Stephen Eyres	2,521	3.23	+0.55
Independent	Rob Berry	2,192	2.81	+2.81
Total formal votes		78,048	96.57	−0.69
Informal votes		2,776	3.43	+0.69
Turnout		80,824	96.06	
Two-party-preferred result
Liberal	Ian Macfarlane	50,802	65.09	+2.05
Labor	Leeann King	27,246	34.91	−2.05
Liberal hold		Swing	+2.05	

=== Herbert ===
2001 Australian federal election: Herbert
Party	Candidate	Votes	%	±%
Liberal	Peter Lindsay	35,349	42.98	+3.07
Labor	Jenny Hill	29,897	36.35	−0.84
Independent	Conway Bown	6,473	7.87	+7.87
One Nation	Anthony Weil	5,827	7.08	−7.21
Democrats	Richard Hoolihan	2,494	3.03	+0.46
Greens	Anne Goddard	2,205	2.68	+0.41
Total formal votes		82,245	95.07	−1.07
Informal votes		4,266	4.93	+1.07
Turnout		86,511	96.31	
Two-party-preferred result
Liberal	Peter Lindsay	42,455	51.62	+1.52
Labor	Jenny Hill	39,790	48.38	−1.52
Liberal hold		Swing	+1.52	

=== Hinkler ===
2001 Australian federal election: Hinkler
Party	Candidate	Votes	%	±%
National	Paul Neville	29,231	39.11	+2.53
Labor	Cheryl Dorron	28,483	38.13	−1.98
Independent	Peter Melville	7,147	9.56	+9.56
One Nation	Martin Janke	6,562	8.78	−10.21
Greens	Theresa Bates	1,904	2.55	+0.97
Democrats	Lisa White	1,393	1.87	−0.45
Total formal votes		74,720	95.56	−1.25
Informal votes		3,476	4.44	+1.25
Turnout		78,196	96.54	
Two-party-preferred result
National	Paul Neville	37,392	50.04	−0.30
Labor	Cheryl Dorron	37,328	49.96	+0.30
National hold		Swing	−0.30	

=== Kennedy ===
2001 Australian federal election: Kennedy
Party	Candidate	Votes	%	±%
Independent	Bob Katter	35,555	47.10	+47.10
Labor	Alan Neilan	17,613	23.33	−5.91
National	Mary Lyle	10,718	14.19	−29.93
One Nation	Jerry Burnett	7,460	9.88	−8.95
Democrats	Jo Wall	2,307	3.06	+0.54
Greens	Cherie Rivas	1,601	2.12	+0.75
Citizens Electoral Council	Judith Harris	229	0.30	−0.03
Total formal votes		75,483	95.35	−0.87
Informal votes		3,685	4.65	+0.87
Turnout		79,168	94.31	
Notional two-party-preferred count
National	Mary Lyle	44,501	58.95	−2.24
Labor	Alan Neilan	30,982	41.05	+2.24
Two-candidate-preferred result
Independent	Bob Katter	52,602	69.73	+69.73
Labor	Alan Neilan	22,881	30.27	−8.53
Member changed to Independent from National		Swing	N/A	

=== Leichhardt ===
2001 Australian federal election: Leichhardt
Party	Candidate	Votes	%	±%
Liberal	Warren Entsch	36,215	48.76	+7.31
Labor	Matt Trezise	24,636	33.17	−3.80
One Nation	Thomas East	6,324	8.51	−5.38
Greens	Jonathan Metcalfe	3,890	5.24	+2.35
Democrats	Harold Salier	2,643	3.56	+0.41
Independent	Rata Hami Pugh	561	0.76	+0.51
Total formal votes		74,269	94.08	−1.96
Informal votes		4,672	5.92	+1.96
Turnout		78,941	93.45	
Two-party-preferred result
Liberal	Warren Entsch	41,884	56.39	+2.34
Labor	Matt Trezise	32,385	43.61	−2.34
Liberal hold		Swing	+2.34	

=== Lilley ===
2001 Australian federal election: Lilley
Party	Candidate	Votes	%	±%
Labor	Wayne Swan	37,713	47.11	+1.94
Liberal	David Ross	31,855	39.79	+1.51
Democrats	Rod McDonough	4,565	5.70	+0.80
Greens	Sue Meehan	3,011	3.76	+1.50
One Nation	Pierre Bocquee	2,914	3.64	−4.86
Total formal votes		80,058	96.29	−0.95
Informal votes		3,083	3.71	+0.95
Turnout		83,141	95.37	
Two-party-preferred result
Labor	Wayne Swan	43,899	54.83	+1.70
Liberal	David Ross	36,159	45.17	−1.70
Labor hold		Swing	+1.70	

=== Longman ===
2001 Australian federal election: Longman
Party	Candidate	Votes	%	±%
Liberal	Mal Brough	34,229	45.37	+6.44
Labor	Stephen Beckett	27,629	36.62	+1.86
One Nation	Bert Bowden	6,223	8.25	−9.90
Democrats	Bronwyn Patrick	2,992	3.97	−1.02
Greens	Eve Scopes	2,556	3.39	+0.23
Independent	Brian Hallam	1,665	2.21	+2.21
Citizens Electoral Council	Leslie Hardwick	148	0.20	+0.20
Total formal votes		75,442	94.73	−2.38
Informal votes		4,195	5.27	+2.38
Turnout		79,637	96.12	
Two-party-preferred result
Liberal	Mal Brough	39,774	52.72	+1.80
Labor	Stephen Beckett	35,668	47.28	−1.80
Liberal hold		Swing	+1.80	

=== Maranoa ===
2001 Australian federal election: Maranoa
Party	Candidate	Votes	%	±%
National	Bruce Scott	41,685	54.92	+9.73
Labor	David Bowden	17,696	23.32	−1.80
One Nation	Mark McNichol	11,429	15.06	−7.34
Democrats	Rhonda Wilson	2,977	3.92	+1.12
Greens	Noel Nemeth	1,512	1.99	+0.58
Citizens Electoral Council	Cindy Rolls	600	0.79	+0.47
Total formal votes		75,899	95.31	−0.93
Informal votes		3,732	4.69	+0.93
Turnout		79,631	95.53	
Two-party-preferred result
National	Bruce Scott	50,103	66.01	+1.59
Labor	David Bowden	25,796	33.99	−1.59
National hold		Swing	+1.59	

=== McPherson ===
2001 Australian federal election: McPherson
Party	Candidate	Votes	%	±%
Liberal	Margaret May	46,641	55.21	+10.04
Labor	Kellie Trigger	24,055	28.47	−4.65
One Nation	Paul Lewis	4,989	5.91	−3.67
Greens	Inge Light	4,220	5.00	+1.76
Democrats	Russell White	3,485	4.13	+0.30
Independent	Ronald Bradley	607	0.72	+0.72
Independent	Kevin Goodwin	481	0.57	−0.17
Total formal votes		84,478	94.67	−1.13
Informal votes		4,754	5.33	+1.13
Turnout		89,232	95.26	
Two-party-preferred result
Liberal	Margaret May	52,839	62.55	+4.21
Labor	Kellie Trigger	31,639	37.45	−4.21
Liberal hold		Swing	+4.21	

=== Moncrieff ===
2001 Australian federal election: Moncrieff
Party	Candidate	Votes	%	±%
Liberal	Steven Ciobo	39,586	50.91	−0.97
Labor	Victoria Chatterjee	19,158	24.64	−4.47
National	Susie Douglas	4,914	6.32	+6.32
One Nation	Lesley Millar	4,458	5.73	−4.44
Democrats	Kari Derrick	3,439	4.42	+0.81
Greens	Dean Hepburn	3,014	3.88	+0.87
Independent	Josephine Tobias	2,286	2.94	+2.94
Independent	Maxwell Aleckson	549	0.71	+0.71
Independent	Maurie Carroll	360	0.46	+0.46
Total formal votes		77,764	92.88	−2.63
Informal votes		5,958	7.12	+2.63
Turnout		83,722	94.48	
Two-party-preferred result
Liberal	Steven Ciobo	50,876	65.42	+2.59
Labor	Victoria Chatterjee	26,888	34.58	−2.59
Liberal hold		Swing	+2.59	

=== Moreton ===
2001 Australian federal election: Moreton
Party	Candidate	Votes	%	±%
Liberal	Gary Hardgrave	39,148	48.74	+5.62
Labor	Kathleen Brookes	29,144	36.29	−3.64
Democrats	Tracy Comans	4,525	5.63	+0.46
Greens	Lenore Taylor	3,677	4.58	+1.22
One Nation	Barry Weedon	2,433	3.03	−4.16
Independent	Andrew Lamb	1,385	1.72	+1.72
Total formal votes		80,312	95.70	−1.27
Informal votes		3,606	4.30	+1.27
Turnout		83,918	94.73	
Two-party-preferred result
Liberal	Gary Hardgrave	43,535	54.21	+3.64
Labor	Kathleen Brookes	36,777	45.79	−3.64
Liberal hold		Swing	+3.64	

=== Oxley ===
2001 Australian federal election: Oxley
Party	Candidate	Votes	%	±%
Labor	Bernie Ripoll	37,797	49.46	+3.71
Liberal	Kevin Parer	23,818	31.17	+6.68
One Nation	Thomas Armstrong	8,085	10.58	−7.08
Democrats	Kate Kunzelmann	4,282	5.60	+1.73
Greens	John McKeon	2,433	3.18	+1.51
Total formal votes		76,415	94.70	−0.87
Informal votes		4,278	5.30	+0.87
Turnout		80,693	95.66	
Two-party-preferred result
Labor	Bernie Ripoll	44,427	58.14	−0.06
Liberal	Kevin Parer	31,988	41.86	+0.06
Labor hold		Swing	−0.06	

=== Petrie ===
2001 Australian federal election: Petrie
Party	Candidate	Votes	%	±%
Liberal	Teresa Gambaro	39,411	48.19	+5.82
Labor	Rosemary Hume	31,044	37.96	−1.70
Democrats	Owen Griffiths	4,284	5.24	+0.15
One Nation	Bill Black	3,463	4.23	−6.86
Greens	Kim Pantano	2,254	2.76	+0.96
Independent	Ron Eaton	1,319	1.61	+1.61
Total formal votes		81,775	95.74	−1.67
Informal votes		3,640	4.26	+1.67
Turnout		85,415	95.62	
Two-party-preferred result
Liberal	Teresa Gambaro	43,682	53.42	+2.67
Labor	Rosemary Hume	38,093	46.58	−2.67
Liberal hold		Swing	+2.67	

=== Rankin ===
2001 Australian federal election: Rankin
Party	Candidate	Votes	%	±%
Labor	Craig Emerson	36,875	49.45	+1.97
Liberal	Paul Wood	27,524	36.91	+7.00
One Nation	Mark Mackenzie	4,724	6.33	−6.28
Democrats	Darryl Dobson	3,572	4.79	+0.57
Greens	Daniel Lloyd	1,875	2.51	+0.30
Total formal votes		74,570	93.40	−2.15
Informal votes		5,269	6.60	+2.15
Turnout		79,839	94.18	
Two-party-preferred result
Labor	Craig Emerson	42,267	56.68	−2.01
Liberal	Paul Wood	32,303	43.32	+2.01
Labor hold		Swing	−2.01	

=== Ryan ===
2001 Australian federal election: Ryan
Party	Candidate	Votes	%	±%
Liberal	Michael Johnson	38,894	47.57	−2.83
Labor	Leonie Short	25,603	31.32	+0.97
National	Stewart Gillies	5,049	6.18	+6.18
Democrats	Jason Langenauer	4,742	5.80	−2.18
Greens	Mike Stasse	4,035	4.94	+1.11
One Nation	John Drew	1,339	1.64	−3.60
HEMP	Clive Brazier	1,084	1.33	+1.33
Independent	Stephen Allen-Ankins	1,010	1.24	+1.24
Total formal votes		81,756	97.14	−0.54
Informal votes		2,404	2.86	+0.54
Turnout		84,160	96.02	
Two-party-preferred result
Liberal	Michael Johnson	47,928	58.62	−0.90
Labor	Leonie Short	33,828	41.38	+0.90
Liberal hold		Swing	−0.90	

John Moore (Liberal) had won the seat at the 1998 election, however he retired in 2001 and Leonie Short (Labor) won the seat at the resulting by-election.

=== Wide Bay ===
2001 Australian federal election: Wide Bay
Party	Candidate	Votes	%	±%
National	Warren Truss	33,124	45.15	+13.69
Labor	Russ Tremlin	19,733	26.90	−1.53
One Nation	Jim Dwyer	8,176	11.15	−15.19
Independent	Graeme Wicks	3,380	4.61	+4.61
Independent	David Dalgleish	3,192	4.35	+4.35
Independent	Tony Pitt	2,650	3.61	+3.61
Greens	Paul Jansen	1,385	1.89	+0.61
Democrats	Althea Smith	1,230	1.68	−0.49
Citizens Electoral Council	Maurice Hetherington	489	0.67	+0.67
Total formal votes		73,359	94.43	−2.30
Informal votes		4,329	5.57	+2.30
Turnout		77,688	96.04	
Two-party-preferred result
National	Warren Truss	44,548	60.73	+7.87
Labor	Russ Tremlin	28,811	39.27	−7.87
National hold		Swing	+7.87	

== See also ==
- Results of the 2001 Australian federal election (House of Representatives)
- Members of the Australian House of Representatives, 2001–2004
