= Results of the 2007 Australian federal election in Queensland =

2007 Australian federal election (Queensland)
← 2004	24 November 2007	2010 →

All 29 Queensland seats in the Australian House of Representatives and 6 seats in the Australian Senate
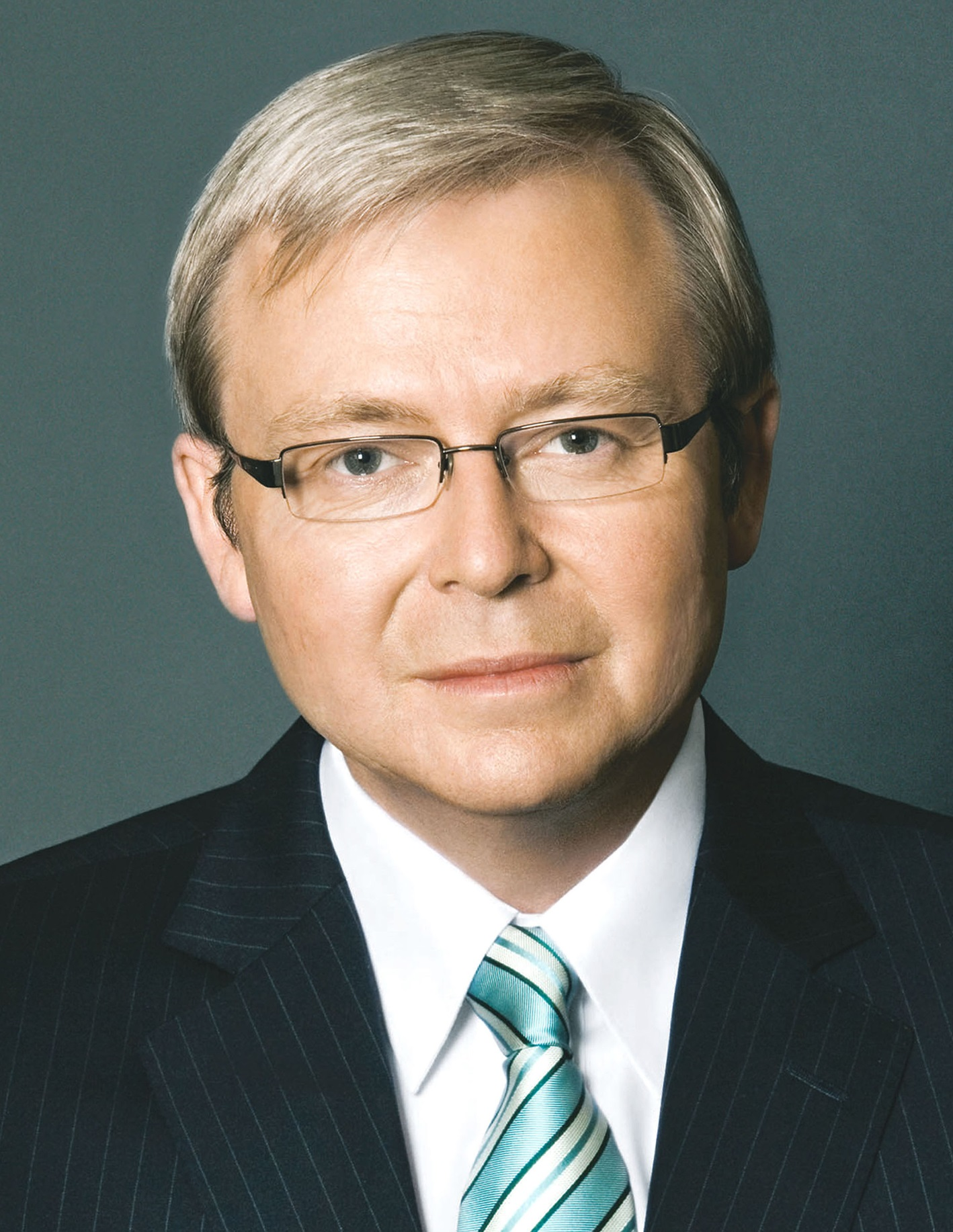

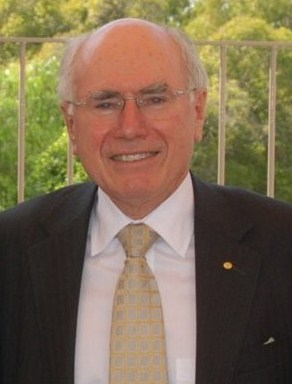
	First party	Second party
Leader	Kevin Rudd	John Howard
Party	Labor	Liberal/National coalition
Last election	6 seats	21 seats
Seats won	15 seats	13 seats
Seat change	▲9	▼8
Popular vote	1,020,665	1,057,942
Percentage	42.91%	44.47%
Swing	▲8.13	▼5.33
TPP	50.44%	49.56%
TPP swing	▲7.53	▼7.53
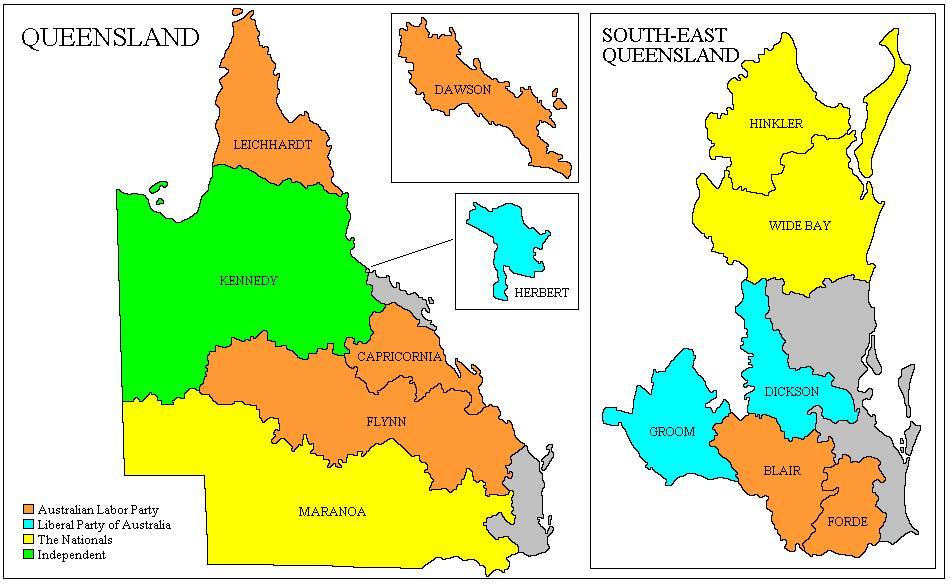
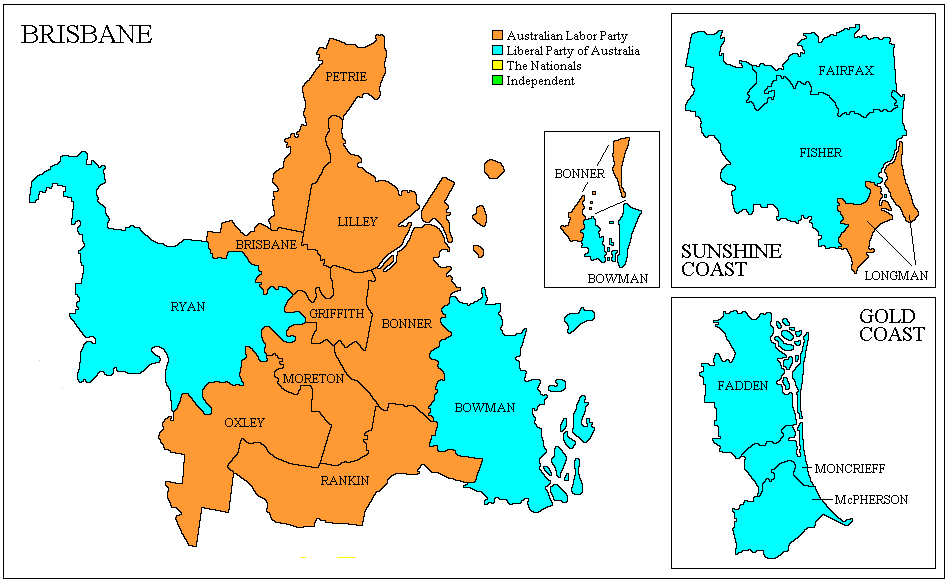

This is a list of electoral division results for the Australian 2007 federal election in the state of Queensland.

== Overall results ==
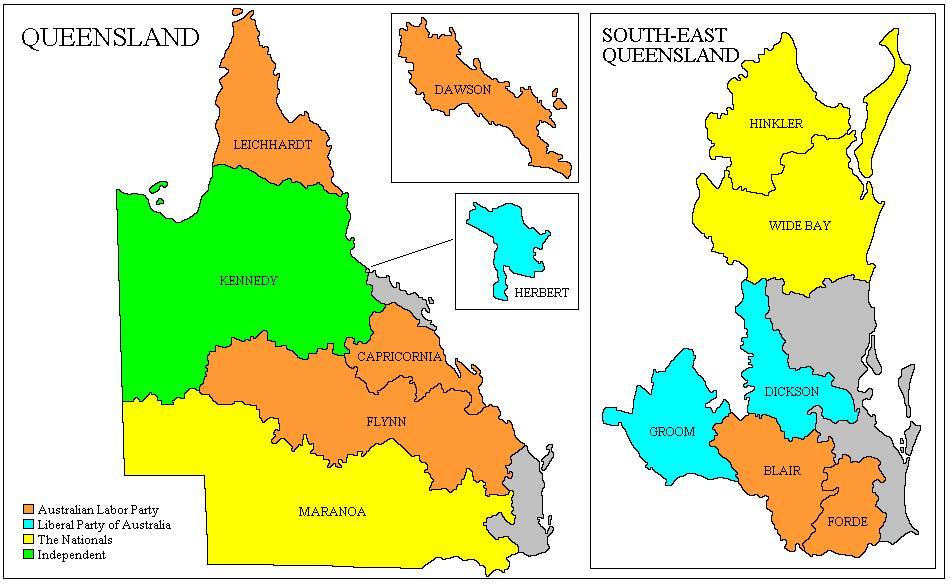
Electoral divisions: Queensland

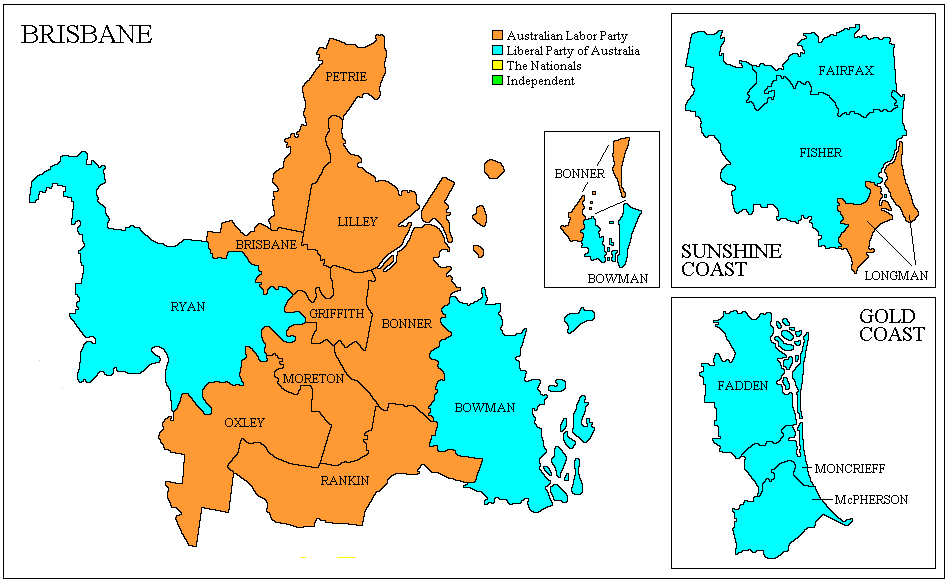
Electoral divisions: Brisbane area

Turnout 94.41% (CV) — Informal 3.56%
Party	Votes	%	Swing	Seats	Change
Labor	1,020,665	42.91	+8.13	15	▲9
Liberal	818,438	34.40	–5.01	10	▼7
National	239,504	10.07	+0.32	3	▼1
Liberal–National coalition	1,057,942	44.47	−4.68	13	▼8
Australian Greens	133,938	5.63	+0.57		
Family First	54,058	2.27	–1.40		
Democrats	22,427	0.94	–0.43		
One Nation	8,619	0.36	–1.62		
Citizens Electoral Council	3,668	0.15	–0.21		
Liberty and Democracy Party	3,531	0.15	+0.15		
Socialist Alliance	1,174	0.05	–0.01		
Fishing Party	1,010	0.04	+0.04		
Christian Democrats	753	0.03	+0.03		
Independents	71,068	2.99	–0.20	1	
Total	2,378,853			29	▲1
Two-party-preferred vote
Labor	1,199,917	50.44	+7.53	15	▲9
Liberal/National coalition	1,178,936	49.56	–7.53	13	▼8
Invalid/blank votes	87,708	3.56	−1.60		
Registered voters/turnout	2,612,504	94.41			
Source: Commonwealth Election 2007

Independents: Bob Katter

Liberal to Labor: Blair, Bonner, Forde, Leichhardt, Longman, Moreton, Petrie

National to Labor: Flynn (notional), Dawson.

== Results by division ==
=== Blair ===
2007 Australian federal election: Blair
Party	Candidate	Votes	%	±%
Labor	Shayne Neumann	40,663	48.83	+11.99
Liberal	Cameron Thompson	35,133	42.19	−5.17
Greens	Peter Luxton	3,262	3.92	+0.68
Family First	Bevan Smith	1,718	2.06	−1.56
Independent	Dale Chorley	1,429	1.72	+1.72
Democrats	David White	735	0.88	−0.44
Liberty & Democracy	Doug Swanborough	196	0.24	+0.24
Citizens Electoral Council	Robert Theis	143	0.17	−0.41
Total formal votes		83,279	96.13	+2.28
Informal votes		3,352	3.87	−2.28
Turnout		86,631	95.22	−0.54
Two-party-preferred result
Labor	Shayne Neumann	45,369	54.48	+10.17
Liberal	Cameron Thompson	37,910	45.52	−10.17
Labor gain from Liberal		Swing	+10.17	

=== Bonner ===
2007 Australian federal election: Bonner
Party	Candidate	Votes	%	±%
Labor	Kerry Rea	40,784	48.80	+6.05
Liberal	Ross Vasta	35,031	41.91	−2.22
Greens	David Wyatt	4,094	4.90	−0.03
Family First	Stephen Gellatly	1,612	1.93	−2.43
Fishing Party	Shane Boese	1,010	1.21	+1.21
Democrats	Vicki Stocks	837	1.00	−0.40
Liberty & Democracy	Lisa Charles	212	0.25	+0.25
Total formal votes		83,580	97.03	+2.67
Informal votes		2,558	2.97	−2.67
Turnout		83,580	95.31	+0.57
Two-party-preferred result
Labor	Kerry Rea	45,576	54.53	+5.04
Liberal	Ross Vasta	38,004	45.47	−5.04
Labor gain from Liberal		Swing	+5.04	

=== Bowman ===
2007 Australian federal election: Bowman
Party	Candidate	Votes	%	±%
Liberal	Andrew Laming	37,886	46.16	−4.27
Labor	Jason Young	36,207	44.11	+8.37
Greens	Brad Scott	4,475	5.45	+0.67
Family First	Alan Lucas	2,405	2.93	−1.03
Democrats	Paul Holland	676	0.82	−0.25
One Nation	Dave Chidgey	433	0.53	+0.53
Total formal votes		82,082	96.62	+1.56
Informal votes		2,873	3.38	−1.56
Turnout		84,955	95.48	+0.89
Two-party-preferred result
Liberal	Andrew Laming	41,073	50.04	−8.86
Labor	Jason Young	41,009	49.96	+8.86
Liberal hold		Swing	−8.86	

=== Brisbane ===
2007 Australian federal election: Brisbane
Party	Candidate	Votes	%	±%
Labor	Arch Bevis	37,715	45.04	+2.58
Liberal	Ted O'Brien	32,989	39.40	−0.58
Greens	Elizabeth Guthrie	9,882	11.80	+2.47
Democrats	Don Sinnamon	1,226	1.51	−0.10
Family First	Mark White	1,183	1.41	−0.94
Socialist Alliance	Ewan Saunders	556	0.68	+0.28
Citizens Electoral Council	Nick Contarino	137	0.16	+0.06
Total formal votes		83,738	97.04	+1.27
Informal votes		2,554	2.96	−1.27
Turnout		86,292	94.10	+0.44
Two-party-preferred result
Labor	Arch Bevis	47,526	56.76	+2.82
Liberal	Ted O'Brien	36,212	43.24	−2.82
Labor hold		Swing	+2.82	

=== Capricornia ===
2007 Australian federal election: Capricornia
Party	Candidate	Votes	%	±%
Labor	Kirsten Livermore	47,508	55.84	+9.89
National	Robert Mills	15,664	18.41	−10.99
Liberal	Scott Kilpatrick	15,416	18.12	+6.96
Greens	Paul Bambrick	2,481	2.92	+0.67
Independent	Bob Oakes	1,859	2.19	+2.19
Family First	Jon Eaton	1,508	1.77	−2.13
Democrats	Anton Prange	422	0.50	−0.87
Citizens Electoral Council	Bill Ingrey	222	0.26	−0.52
Total formal votes		85,080	96.64	+1.16
Informal votes		2,960	3.36	−1.16
Turnout		88,040	94.97	−0.79
Two-party-preferred result
Labor	Kirsten Livermore	53,355	62.71	+8.70
National	Robert Mills	31,725	37.29	−8.70
Labor hold		Swing	+8.70	

=== Dawson ===
2007 Australian federal election: Dawson
Party	Candidate	Votes	%	±%
Labor	James Bidgood	38,423	48.09	+16.44
National	De-Anne Kelly	33,948	42.48	−3.04
Greens	Peter Bell	3,489	4.37	+0.93
Family First	Rena Lee	2,398	3.00	−0.09
Democrats	Chris Doyle	1,216	1.52	+0.64
Citizens Electoral Council	Andrew Harris	432	0.54	−1.87
Total formal votes		79,906	96.20	+1.65
Informal votes		3,156	3.80	−1.65
Turnout		83,062	95.04	−0.36
Two-party-preferred result
Labor	James Bidgood	42,520	53.21	+13.20
National	De-Anne Kelly	37,386	46.79	−13.20
Labor gain from National		Swing	+13.20	

=== Dickson ===
2007 Australian federal election: Dickson
Party	Candidate	Votes	%	±%
Liberal	Peter Dutton	38,507	46.15	−6.65
Labor	Fiona McNamara	36,438	43.67	+9.54
Greens	Howard Nielsen	5,006	6.00	+0.38
Family First	Dale Shuttleworth	2,118	2.54	−1.75
Democrats	Peter Kerin	797	0.96	−0.64
Christian Democrats	Connie Wood	323	0.39	+0.39
Liberty & Democracy	Brad Cornwell	258	0.31	+0.31
Total formal votes		83,447	97.23	+1.64
Informal votes		2,380	2.77	−1.64
Turnout		85,827	96.05	+0.10
Two-party-preferred result
Liberal	Peter Dutton	41,832	50.13	−8.76
Labor	Fiona McNamara	41,615	49.87	+8.76
Liberal hold		Swing	−8.76	

=== Fadden ===
2007 Australian federal election: Fadden
Party	Candidate	Votes	%	±%
Liberal	Stuart Robert	40,813	48.92	−11.17
Labor	Rana Watson	28,106	33.69	+6.14
National	Alex Douglas	6,177	7.40	+7.40
Greens	Michael Beale	3,748	4.49	+0.36
Family First	Ross Wilson	1,743	2.09	−1.73
Independent	David Montgomery	1,065	1.28	+1.28
One Nation	John Walter	695	0.83	−1.23
Citizens Electoral Council	Ken Martin	582	0.70	−0.09
Democrats	Chris Faint	504	0.60	−0.94
Total formal votes		83,433	95.69	+1.80
Informal votes		3,754	4.31	−1.80
Turnout		87,187	93.84	+0.08
Two-party-preferred result
Liberal	Stuart Robert	50,288	60.20	−5.70
Labor	Rana Watson	33,205	39.80	+5.70
Liberal hold		Swing	−5.70	

=== Fairfax ===
2007 Australian federal election: Fairfax
Party	Candidate	Votes	%	±%
Liberal	Alex Somlyay	38,470	46.82	−6.90
Labor	Debbie Blumel	29,960	36.46	+9.22
Greens	Dave Norris	7,011	8.53	+0.36
Family First	Lisa Woods	3,287	4.00	−1.01
Independent	Max Phillips	1,300	1.58	+1.58
One Nation	Kevin Savage	861	1.05	−2.07
Democrats	Janette Hashemi	764	0.93	−1.25
Citizens Electoral Council	Kev Watt	514	0.63	+0.42
Total formal votes		82,167	96.65	+1.72
Informal votes		2,852	3.35	−1.72
Turnout		85,019	94.22	−0.51
Two-party-preferred result
Liberal	Alex Somlyay	43,558	53.01	−9.40
Labor	Debbie Blumel	38,609	46.99	+9.40
Liberal hold		Swing	−9.40	

=== Fisher ===
2007 Australian federal election: Fisher
Party	Candidate	Votes	%	±%
Liberal	Peter Slipper	35,182	44.14	−10.11
Labor	Darrell Main	27,074	33.97	+3.05
Independent	Caroline Hutchinson	10,596	13.29	+13.29
Greens	Matthew Gray	4,474	5.61	−0.09
Family First	Graeme Cumming	1,728	2.17	−1.33
Democrats	Carolyn Kerr	655	0.82	−0.78
Total formal votes		79,079	97.06	+2.72
Informal votes		2,418	2.94	−2.72
Turnout		82,127	94.65	+1.99
Two-party-preferred result
Liberal	Peter Slipper	42,325	53.10	−7.88
Labor	Darrell Main	37,384	46.90	+7.88
Liberal hold		Swing	−7.88	

=== Flynn ===
2007 Australian federal election: Flynn
Party	Candidate	Votes	%	±%
Labor	Chris Trevor	35,892	44.76	+9.18
National	Glenn Churchill	26,907	33.56	−13.34
Liberal	Jason Rose	11,850	14.78	+12.32
Family First	Matthew Drysdale	1,662	2.07	−2.39
Greens	Marella Pettinato	1,577	1.97	−0.65
Independent	Duncan Scott	807	1.01	+1.01
Independent	Phillip Costello	761	0.95	+0.95
Democrats	Julie Noble	535	0.67	−0.47
Liberty & Democracy	Jarrah Job	196	0.24	+0.24
Total formal votes		80,187	95.95	+0.26
Informal votes		3,385	4.05	−0.26
Turnout		83,572	94.99	−0.57
Two-party-preferred result
Labor	Chris Trevor	40,220	50.16	+7.88
National	Glenn Churchill	39,967	49.84	−7.88
Labor notional gain from National		Swing	+7.88	

=== Forde ===
2007 Australian federal election: Forde
Party	Candidate	Votes	%	±%
Labor	Brett Raguse	34,721	44.35	+12.15
Liberal	Wendy Creighton	26,576	33.95	−19.14
National	Hajnal Ban	9,550	12.20	+12.12
Greens	Andy Grodecki	3,756	4.80	+0.73
Family First	Iona Abrahamson	1,756	2.24	−1.84
One Nation	Rod Evans	671	0.86	−2.87
Independent	Chris Coyle	623	0.80	+0.80
Democrats	Maaz Syed	419	0.54	−0.79
Citizens Electoral Council	Daniel Hope	216	0.28	+0.05
Total formal votes		78,288	95.39	+1.95
Informal votes		3,782	4.61	−1.95
Turnout		82,070	94.14	−0.34
Two-party-preferred result
Labor	Brett Raguse	41,419	52.91	+14.43
Liberal	Wendy Creighton	36,869	47.09	−14.43
Labor gain from Liberal		Swing	+14.43	

=== Griffith ===
2007 Australian federal election: Griffith
Party	Candidate	Votes	%	±%
Labor	Kevin Rudd	43,957	53.09	+4.31
Liberal	Craig Thomas	28,133	33.98	−3.49
Greens	Willy Bach	6,496	7.85	−0.97
Independent	P M Howard	2,264	2.73	+2.73
Democrats	Rob Cotterill	819	0.99	−0.33
Family First	Andrew Hassall	654	0.79	−1.17
Socialist Alliance	Jim McIlroy	293	0.35	−0.35
Liberty & Democracy	Samantha Myers	182	0.22	+0.22
Total formal votes		82,798	97.12	+1.38
Informal votes		2,457	2.88	−1.38
Turnout		85,255	93.62	−0.20
Two-party-preferred result
Labor	Kevin Rudd	51,600	62.32	+3.84
Liberal	Craig Thomas	31,198	37.68	−3.84
Labor hold		Swing	+3.84	

=== Groom ===
2007 Australian federal election: Groom
Party	Candidate	Votes	%	±%
Liberal	Ian Macfarlane	43,880	52.71	−7.52
Labor	Chris Meibusch	28,994	34.83	+10.73
Greens	Pauline Collins	4,028	4.84	+0.82
Family First	Peter Findlay	3,649	4.38	−1.99
Independent	Rob Berry	715	0.86	+0.86
Independent	Grahame Volker	616	0.74	+0.74
Democrats	Shalina Najeeb	608	0.73	−0.33
Independent	Rod Jeanneret	497	0.60	−1.75
Citizens Electoral Council	Irene Jones	263	0.32	−0.06
Total formal votes		83,250	96.94	+0.94
Informal votes		2,627	3.06	−0.94
Turnout		85,877	95.51	+0.14
Two-party-preferred result
Liberal	Ian Macfarlane	48,468	58.22	−10.59
Labor	Chris Meibusch	34,782	41.78	+10.59
Liberal hold		Swing	−10.59	

=== Herbert ===
2007 Australian federal election: Herbert
Party	Candidate	Votes	%	±%
Liberal	Peter Lindsay	37,397	45.70	−2.68
Labor	George Colbran	35,838	43.79	+7.81
Greens	Jenny Stirling	4,201	5.13	+0.17
Family First	Michael Punshon	1,283	1.57	−2.33
Independent	Bill Brennan	900	1.10	+1.10
One Nation	Francis Pauler	748	0.91	−2.43
Liberty & Democracy	Ben Thompson	505	0.62	+0.62
Independent	Garrie Lynch	487	0.60	+0.60
Democrats	Sharon Sheridan	476	0.58	−0.73
Total formal votes		81,835	95.81	+1.31
Informal votes		3,575	4.19	−1.31
Turnout		85,410	94.11	−0.77
Two-party-preferred result
Liberal	Peter Lindsay	41,089	50.21	−6.03
Labor	George Colbran	40,746	49.79	+6.03
Liberal hold		Swing	−6.03	

=== Hinkler ===
2007 Australian federal election: Hinkler
Party	Candidate	Votes	%	±%
National	Paul Neville	38,194	46.44	−2.12
Labor	Garry Parr	35,267	42.88	+8.91
Greens	Charles Dickes	3,383	4.11	+0.38
Family First	Cameron Rub	2,886	3.51	−0.63
Independent	Roy Wells	1,887	2.29	+0.67
Democrats	Robert Bromwich	632	0.77	−0.24
Total formal votes		82,249	96.09	+0.92
Informal votes		3,345	3.91	−0.92
Turnout		85,594	95.01	−0.43
Two-party-preferred result
National	Paul Neville	42,515	51.69	−6.65
Labor	Garry Parr	39,734	48.31	+6.65
National hold		Swing	−6.65	

=== Kennedy ===
2007 Australian federal election: Kennedy
Party	Candidate	Votes	%	±%
Independent	Bob Katter	32,537	39.53	−0.23
Labor	Alan Neilan	23,122	28.09	+4.13
National	Ed Morrison	20,292	24.65	+1.17
Greens	Frank Reilly	2,649	3.22	−0.31
Family First	Keith Douglas	1,674	2.03	−1.12
One Nation	Bill Hankin	1,441	1.75	−2.71
Democrats	Nigel Asplin	604	0.73	+0.03
Total formal votes		82,319	96.16	+0.62
Informal votes		3,291	3.84	−0.62
Turnout		85,610	93.37	−0.26
Notional two-party-preferred count
National	Ed Morrison	47,339	57.51	−1.35
Labor	Alan Neilan	34,980	42.49	+1.35
Two-candidate-preferred result
Independent	Bob Katter	54,571	66.29	−2.54
Labor	Alan Neilan	27,748	33.71	+2.54
Independent hold		Swing	−2.54	

=== Leichhardt ===
2007 Australian federal election: Leichhardt
Party	Candidate	Votes	%	±%
Labor	Jim Turnour	35,762	43.12	+12.08
Liberal	Charlie McKillop	32,187	38.81	−14.80
Greens	Sue Cory	6,219	7.50	+0.99
National	Ian Crossland	3,303	3.98	+3.98
Independent	Selwyn Johnston	1,448	1.75	+1.75
Independent	Norman Miller	1,090	1.31	+1.31
Family First	Ben Jacobsen	1,087	1.31	−1.38
Independent	Damian Bynes	917	1.11	+1.11
Democrats	Bridgette Lennox	472	0.57	−0.69
Independent	Tony Hudson	320	0.39	+0.39
Independent	Rata Hami Pugh	139	0.17	+0.17
Total formal votes		82,944	94.95	+0.95
Informal votes		4,416	5.05	−0.95
Turnout		87,360	92.67	+0.25
Two-party-preferred result
Labor	Jim Turnour	44,800	54.01	+14.27
Liberal	Charlie McKillop	38,144	45.99	−14.27
Labor gain from Liberal		Swing	+14.27	

=== Lilley ===
2007 Australian federal election: Lilley
Party	Candidate	Votes	%	±%
Labor	Wayne Swan	43,058	51.57	+2.58
Liberal	Scott McConnel	31,944	38.26	−2.80
Greens	Simon Kean Hammerson	5,654	6.77	+1.12
Family First	Karen Gray	1,376	1.65	−1.15
Democrats	Jennifer Cluse	1,015	1.22	−0.28
Liberty & Democracy	Aubrey Clark	455	0.54	+0.54
Total formal votes		83,502	97.04	+1.69
Informal votes		2,548	2.96	−1.69
Turnout		86,050	94.81	+0.29
Two-party-preferred result
Labor	Wayne Swan	48,921	58.59	+3.19
Liberal	Scott McConnel	34,581	41.41	−3.19
Labor hold		Swing	+3.19	

=== Longman ===
2007 Australian federal election: Longman
Party	Candidate	Votes	%	±%
Labor	Jon Sullivan	39,434	47.98	+10.92
Liberal	Mal Brough	36,009	43.82	−7.32
Greens	Paul Costin	3,486	4.24	+0.36
Family First	Peter Urquhart	1,525	1.86	−1.35
Democrats	Liz Oss-Emer	1,153	1.40	−0.29
Liberty & Democracy	Trent MacDonald	410	0.50	+0.50
Citizens Electoral Council	Dan Winniak	166	0.20	+0.20
Total formal votes		82,183	96.53	+2.18
Informal votes		2,950	3.47	−2.18
Turnout		85,133	94.79	−0.47
Two-party-preferred result
Labor	Jon Sullivan	44,026	53.57	+10.32
Liberal	Mal Brough	38,157	46.43	−10.32
Labor gain from Liberal		Swing	+10.32	

=== Maranoa ===
2007 Australian federal election: Maranoa
Party	Candidate	Votes	%	±%
National	Bruce Scott	46,293	58.57	+10.75
Labor	Mike Bathersby	23,288	29.46	+7.65
Family First	David Totenhofer	3,034	3.84	−0.15
One Nation	Rod Watson	2,774	3.51	−1.61
Greens	Bob East	2,646	3.35	+1.10
Democrats	Alan Dickson	1,004	1.27	+0.14
Total formal votes		79,039	96.44	+1.38
Informal votes		2,920	3.56	−1.38
Turnout		81,959	94.47	−0.87
Two-party-preferred result
National	Bruce Scott	50,936	64.44	−6.61
Labor	Mike Bathersby	28,103	35.56	+6.61
National hold		Swing	−6.61	

=== McPherson ===
2007 Australian federal election: McPherson
Party	Candidate	Votes	%	±%
Liberal	Margaret May	45,979	54.98	−3.96
Labor	Eddy Sarroff	29,798	35.63	+5.55
Greens	Ben O'Callaghan	4,986	5.96	+0.79
Family First	Kevin Davis	1,282	1.53	−1.30
Democrats	Lori Carnwell	791	0.95	−0.13
Independent	Tyrone Jackson	666	0.80	+0.80
Citizens Electoral Council	Geoff Cornell	127	0.15	+0.10
Total formal votes		83,629	96.84	+2.09
Informal votes		2,727	3.16	−2.09
Turnout		86,356	93.54	−0.55
Two-party-preferred result
Liberal	Margaret May	49,195	58.83	−5.11
Labor	Eddy Sarroff	34,434	41.17	+5.11
Liberal hold		Swing	−5.11	

=== Moncrieff ===
2007 Australian federal election: Moncrieff
Party	Candidate	Votes	%	±%
Liberal	Steven Ciobo	48,594	59.77	−4.03
Labor	Sam Miszkowski	24,397	30.01	+5.66
Greens	Carla Brandon	5,048	6.21	+1.17
Family First	James Tayler	1,440	1.77	−1.26
Democrats	Paul Stevenson	731	0.90	−0.29
Independent	Paul Shears	562	0.69	+0.69
Socialist Alliance	Tim Kirchler	315	0.39	+0.39
Citizens Electoral Council	Elisabeth Thompson	214	0.26	−0.62
Total formal votes		81,301	96.23	+2.26
Informal votes		3,186	3.77	−2.26
Turnout		84,487	92.21	−0.56
Two-party-preferred result
Liberal	Steven Ciobo	52,042	64.01	−5.52
Labor	Sam Miszkowski	29,259	35.99	+5.52
Liberal hold		Swing	−5.52	

=== Moreton ===
2007 Australian federal election: Moreton
Party	Candidate	Votes	%	±%
Labor	Graham Perrett	37,908	47.11	+7.27
Liberal	Gary Hardgrave	33,921	42.16	−5.41
Greens	Emma Hine	5,548	6.89	+1.12
Family First	Steve Christian	1,113	1.38	−1.40
Democrats	Emad Soliman	1,015	1.26	−0.41
Independent	Andrew Lamb	679	0.84	−0.10
Liberty & Democracy	Shane Brown	282	0.35	+0.35
Total formal votes		80,466	96.86	+1.74
Informal votes		2,611	3.14	−1.74
Turnout		83,077	94.17	+0.37
Two-party-preferred result
Labor	Graham Perrett	44,055	54.75	+7.58
Liberal	Gary Hardgrave	36,411	45.25	−7.58
Labor gain from Liberal		Swing	+7.58	

=== Oxley ===
2007 Australian federal election: Oxley
Party	Candidate	Votes	%	±%
Labor	Bernie Ripoll	47,128	58.56	+10.01
Liberal	Scott White	26,297	32.68	−4.05
Greens	Austin Lund	4,128	5.13	+0.81
Family First	Gregory Roy	1,682	2.09	−1.35
Democrats	Murray Henman	951	1.18	+0.01
Citizens Electoral Council	Brian Haag	289	0.36	−0.60
Total formal votes		80,475	95.79	+2.56
Informal votes		3,535	4.21	−2.56
Turnout		84,010	94.13	−0.59
Two-party-preferred result
Labor	Bernie Ripoll	51,607	64.13	+7.01
Liberal	Scott White	28,868	35.87	−7.01
Labor hold		Swing	+7.01	

=== Petrie ===
2007 Australian federal election: Petrie
Party	Candidate	Votes	%	±%
Labor	Yvette D'Ath	38,988	46.89	+9.39
Liberal	Teresa Gambaro	37,299	44.86	−7.41
Greens	Terry Jones	3,890	4.68	−0.02
Family First	Sally Vincent	1,516	1.82	−1.88
Democrats	Bruce Carnwell	814	0.98	−0.76
Christian Democrats	Peter Britt	430	0.52	+0.52
Liberty & Democracy	Michael Pope	217	0.26	+0.26
Total formal votes		83,154	97.03	+1.04
Informal votes		2,546	2.97	−1.04
Turnout		85,700	95.12	−0.38
Two-party-preferred result
Labor	Yvette D'Ath	43,283	52.05	+9.50
Liberal	Teresa Gambaro	39,871	47.95	−9.50
Labor gain from Liberal		Swing	+9.50	

=== Rankin ===
2007 Australian federal election: Rankin
Party	Candidate	Votes	%	±%
Labor	Craig Emerson	44,858	56.01	+12.22
Liberal	Peter Coulson	27,299	34.09	−3.01
Greens	Neil Cotter	3,773	4.71	+1.50
Family First	Bert van Manen	2,827	3.53	−1.59
Democrats	Salam El-Merebi	590	0.74	−0.11
Liberty & Democracy	Liam Tjia	463	0.58	+0.58
Citizens Electoral Council	Robert Meyers	273	0.34	+0.13
Total formal votes		80,083	95.51	+2.68
Informal votes		3,764	4.49	−2.68
Turnout		83,847	93.53	−0.56
Two-party-preferred result
Labor	Craig Emerson	49,440	61.74	+8.76
Liberal	Peter Coulson	30,643	38.26	−8.76
Labor hold		Swing	+8.76	

=== Ryan ===
2007 Australian federal election: Ryan
Party	Candidate	Votes	%	±%
Liberal	Michael Johnson	41,646	49.52	−5.24
Labor	Ross Daniels	30,619	36.41	+7.00
Greens	Evan Jones	7,933	9.43	−0.33
Independent	Charles Worringham	1,328	1.58	+1.58
Democrats	James Page	1,207	1.44	−0.98
Family First	Leisa Schmid	1,120	1.33	−2.03
Liberty & Democracy	Jock Mackenzie	155	0.18	+0.18
Citizens Electoral Council	Neville Solomon	90	0.11	−0.17
Total formal votes		84,098	97.86	+1.66
Informal votes		1,842	2.14	−1.66
Turnout		85,940	94.95	+0.64
Two-party-preferred result
Liberal	Michael Johnson	45,258	53.82	−6.60
Labor	Ross Daniels	38,840	46.18	+6.60
Liberal hold		Swing	−6.60	

=== Wide Bay ===
2007 Australian federal election: Wide Bay
Party	Candidate	Votes	%	±%
National	Warren Truss	39,177	48.59	+20.76
Labor	Tony Lawrence	24,758	30.70	+5.19
Greens	Katherine Webb	6,615	8.20	+1.19
Independent	Cate Molloy	5,576	6.92	+6.92
Family First	John Chapman	2,792	3.46	−0.13
One Nation	Martin Essenberg	996	1.24	−2.90
Democrats	Terry Shaw	719	0.89	−0.85
Total formal votes		80,633	96.02	+0.95
Informal votes		3,343	3.98	−0.95
Turnout		83,976	94.41	−0.55
Two-party-preferred result
National	Warren Truss	47,149	58.47	−3.74
Labor	Tony Lawrence	33,484	41.53	+3.74
National hold		Swing	−3.74	

== See also ==
- Members of the Australian House of Representatives, 2007–2010
