= Results of the 1998 Australian federal election in Queensland =

Results of the 1998 Australian Election in Queensland

1998 Australian federal election (Queensland)
← 1996	3 October 1998	2001 →

All 27 Queensland seats in the Australian House of Representatives and 6 seats in the Australian Senate
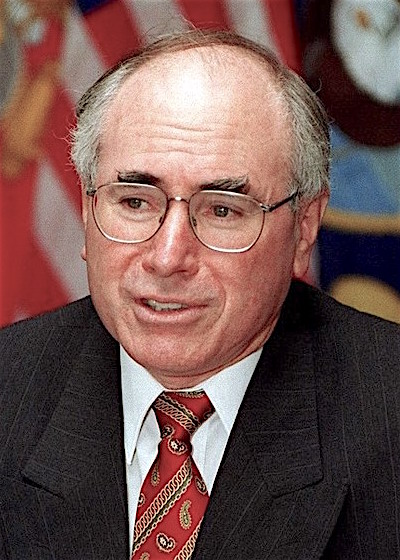

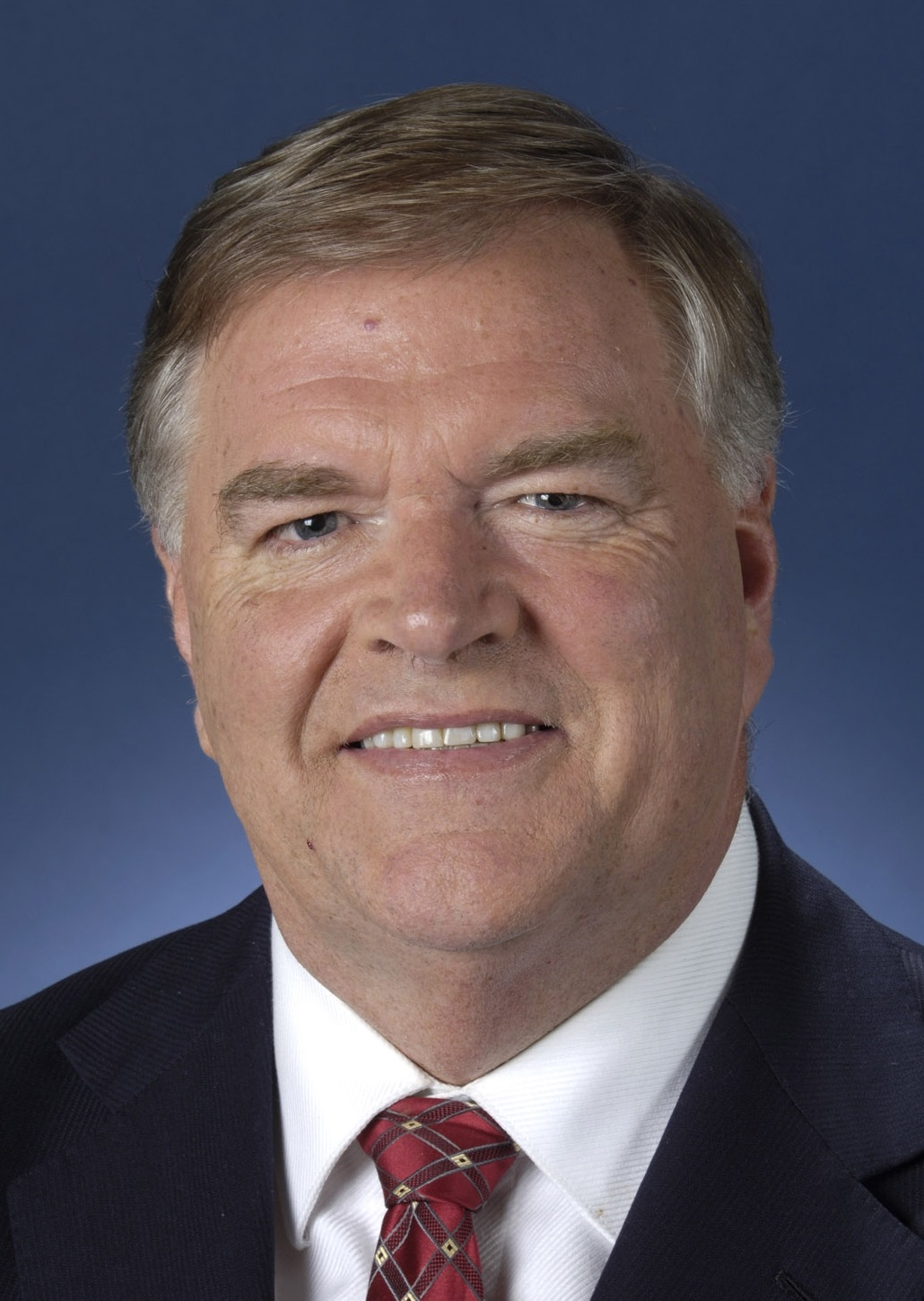

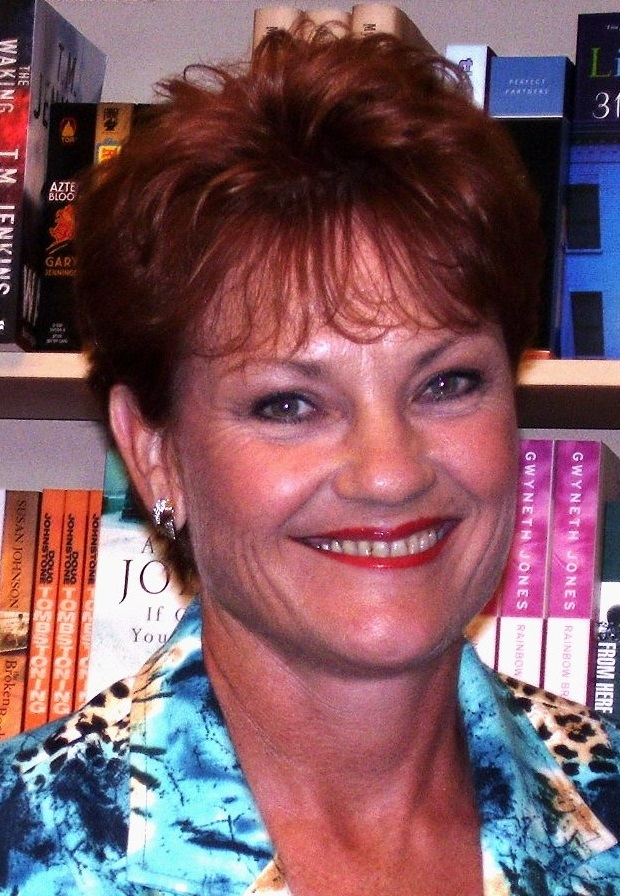
	First party	Second party	Third party
Leader	John Howard	Kim Beazley	Pauline Hanson
Party	Liberal/National coalition	Labor	One Nation
Last election	23 seats	2 seats	—
Seats before	23	2	1
Seats won	19	8	0
Seat change	▼4	▲6	▼1
Primary vote	814,338	719,743	285,983
Percentage	40.85%	36.11%	14.35%
Swing	▼14.35	▲2.91	▲14.35
TPP	53.05%	46.95%
TPP swing	▼7.17	▲7.17

This is a list of electoral division results for the 1998 Australian federal election in the state of Queensland.

== Overall results ==
Turnout 94.2% (CV) — Informal 3.2%
Party	Votes	%	Swing	Seats	Change
Liberal	615,153	30.86	-8.44	14	▼3
National	199,185	9.99	-5.91	5	▼1
Liberal/National Coalition	814,338	40.85	-14.35	19	▼4
Labor	719,743	36.11	2.91	8	▲6
One Nation	285,983	14.35	14.35		
Democrats	80,003	4.01	-2.69		
Greens	47,440	2.38	-2.42		
Independents (Note: Pauline Hanson has been counted as an independent for the 1996 election. She had been disendorsed as the Liberal candidate and ran as an independent, but she remained a Liberal on the ballot paper.)	29,388	1.47	1.47		▼1
Christian Democrats	11,243	0.56	0.56		
Citizens Electoral Council	1,506	0.08	0.08		
Women's Party	1,426	0.07	0.00		
Family Law Reform	1,199	0.06	0.00		
Democratic Socialist	778	0.04	0.00		
Abolish Child Support	170	0.01	0.00		
Australia First	158	0.01	0.00		
Total	1,993,375			27	▲1
Two-party-preferred vote
Labor	935,867	46.95	7.17	8	▲6
Liberal/National Coalition	1,057,508	53.05	-7.17	19	▼4
Invalid/blank votes	68,659	3.2			
Turnout	2,062,034	94.2			
Registered voters	2,188,024				
Source: Federal Elections 1998

== Results by division ==
=== Blair ===
1998 Australian federal election: Blair
Party	Candidate	Votes	%	±%
One Nation	Pauline Hanson	24,516	35.97	+35.97
Labor	Virginia Clarke	17,239	25.29	−0.18
Liberal	Cameron Thompson	14,787	21.69	−24.19
National	Brett White	6,989	10.25	−6.91
Democrats	Neal McKenzie	2,478	3.64	−2.13
Greens	Libby Connors	1,230	1.80	−0.43
Independent	Lee Roberts	556	0.82	+0.82
Citizens Electoral Council	Owen Bassingthwaighte	199	0.29	+0.29
Abolish Child Support	Mark Sloan	170	0.25	+0.25
Total formal votes		68,164	96.41	−0.98
Informal votes		2,541	3.59	+0.98
Turnout		70,705	95.28	
Notional two-party-preferred count
Liberal	Cameron Thompson	39,553	58.03	−10.61
Labor	Virginia Clarke	28,611	41.97	+10.61
Two-candidate-preferred result
Liberal	Cameron Thompson	36,398	53.40	−15.30
One Nation	Pauline Hanson	31,766	46.60	+46.60
Liberal notional hold		Swing	−15.30	

=== Bowman ===
1998 Australian federal election: Bowman
Party	Candidate	Votes	%	±%
Labor	Con Sciacca	32,606	43.83	+1.70
Liberal	Andrea West	27,927	37.54	−8.98
One Nation	Barry Myatt	8,227	11.06	+11.06
Democrats	Jenny van Rooyen	4,021	5.41	−2.97
Greens	Deeane Moorhead	1,606	2.16	−0.34
Total formal votes		74,387	97.36	−0.45
Informal votes		2,015	2.64	+0.45
Turnout		76,402	95.02	−0.49
Two-party-preferred result
Labor	Con Sciacca	39,642	53.29	+4.18
Liberal	Andrea West	34,746	46.71	−4.18
Labor gain from Liberal		Swing	+4.18	

=== Brisbane ===
1998 Australian federal election: Brisbane
Party	Candidate	Votes	%	±%
Labor	Arch Bevis	35,653	44.34	+5.70
Liberal	Marion Feros	30,570	38.02	−6.05
Democrats	Darryl Holbrook	4,878	6.07	−2.77
One Nation	Samuel Tornatore	3,895	4.84	+4.84
Greens	Brenda Mason	3,824	4.76	+0.82
Independent	Duncan Spender	814	1.01	+1.01
Democratic Socialist	Graham Matthews	778	0.97	+0.97
Total formal votes		80,412	97.21	−0.35
Informal votes		2,311	2.79	+0.35
Turnout		82,723	92.78	+0.03
Two-party-preferred result
Labor	Arch Bevis	43,895	54.59	+3.93
Liberal	Marion Feros	36,517	45.41	−3.93
Labor hold		Swing	+3.93	

=== Capricornia ===
1998 Australian federal election: Capricornia
Party	Candidate	Votes	%	±%
Labor	Kirsten Livermore	35,229	47.11	+6.83
National	Paul Marek	24,197	32.35	+3.69
One Nation	Len Timms	10,393	13.90	+13.90
Democrats	Fay Lawrence	2,255	3.02	−2.27
Greens	Joan Furness	1,334	1.78	−0.70
Independent	Peter Schuback	1,107	1.48	+1.48
Citizens Electoral Council	Andrew Purvis	271	0.36	+0.36
Total formal votes		74,786	97.41	−0.42
Informal votes		1,990	2.59	+0.42
Turnout		76,776	95.25	−0.17
Two-party-preferred result
Labor	Kirsten Livermore	41,352	55.29	+8.75
National	Paul Marek	33,434	44.71	−8.75
Labor gain from National		Swing	+8.75	

=== Dawson ===
1998 Australian federal election: Dawson
Party	Candidate	Votes	%	±%
National	De-Anne Kelly	32,312	41.64	+5.49
Labor	Mark Stroppiana	29,507	38.02	+3.31
One Nation	Barbara Eggers	12,350	15.91	+15.91
Democrats	Darin Preston	1,567	2.02	−1.86
Greens	Helen King	1,027	1.32	+1.32
Independent	Kevin McLean	840	1.08	+1.08
Total formal votes		77,603	97.22	−0.57
Informal votes		2,219	2.78	+0.57
Turnout		79,822	95.01	+0.07
Two-party-preferred result
National	De-Anne Kelly	42,228	54.42	−6.43
Labor	Mark Stroppiana	35,375	45.58	+6.43
National hold		Swing	−6.43	

=== Dickson ===
1998 Australian federal election: Dickson
Party	Candidate	Votes	%	±%
Labor	Cheryl Kernot	29,899	40.60	+1.26
Liberal	Rod Henshaw	25,622	34.79	−6.99
Independent	Tony Smith	6,595	8.96	+8.96
One Nation	Bruce Camfield	6,271	8.52	+8.52
Democrats	Lis Manktelow	3,008	4.08	−1.96
Greens	Kim Pantano	1,536	2.09	−0.96
Independent	Mark Kelly	264	0.36	+0.36
Independent	Robert Halliday	227	0.31	+0.31
Family Law Reform	Eddie Dunne	224	0.30	+0.30
Total formal votes		73,646	96.50	−1.08
Informal votes		2,672	3.50	+1.08
Turnout		76,318	95.69	−0.33
Two-party-preferred result
Labor	Cheryl Kernot	36,911	50.12	+4.02
Liberal	Rod Henshaw	36,735	49.88	−4.02
Labor gain from Independent		Swing	+4.02	

=== Fadden ===
1998 Australian federal election: Fadden
Party	Candidate	Votes	%	±%
Liberal	David Jull	34,195	47.49	−12.93
Labor	Mike Smith	22,460	31.19	+4.94
One Nation	Neil Pitt	9,213	12.79	+12.79
Democrats	Neil Cotter	3,248	4.51	−5.30
Greens	Fay Smith	1,472	2.04	−0.48
Christian Democrats	John McGuigan	1,418	1.97	+1.96
Total formal votes		72,006	96.62	−0.91
Informal votes		2,521	3.38	+0.91
Turnout		74,527	93.64	−1.18
Two-party-preferred result
Liberal	David Jull	41,466	57.59	−9.96
Labor	Mike Smith	30,540	42.41	+9.96
Liberal hold		Swing	−9.96	

=== Fairfax ===
1998 Australian federal election: Fairfax
Party	Candidate	Votes	%	±%
Liberal	Alex Somlyay	24,709	36.03	−7.83
Labor	John Henderson	19,679	28.69	+4.14
One Nation	Fraser Anning	12,171	17.75	+17.75
National	Lindsay Horswood	4,692	6.84	−10.23
Democrats	John Ryan	2,754	4.02	−4.14
Greens	Peter Bakhash	2,381	3.47	−0.85
Christian Democrats	Harry Cook	1,279	1.86	+1.86
Independent	Mike Harper	921	1.34	+1.34
Total formal votes		68,586	96.24	−1.37
Informal votes		2,679	3.76	+1.37
Turnout		71,265	93.71	−0.46
Two-party-preferred result
Liberal	Alex Somlyay	37,286	54.36	−13.25
Labor	John Henderson	31,300	45.64	+13.25
Liberal hold		Swing	−13.25	

=== Fisher ===
1998 Australian federal election: Fisher
Party	Candidate	Votes	%	±%
Liberal	Peter Slipper	33,187	48.02	−9.06
Labor	Ray O'Donnell	19,205	27.79	+4.54
One Nation	Tim Jenkins	10,132	14.66	+14.66
Democrats	Jenny Henman	2,697	3.90	−1.79
Greens	Les Shotton	1,852	2.68	−0.47
Christian Democrats	Peter Urquhart	1,348	1.95	+1.95
Independent	Alexander Taylor	396	0.57	+0.57
Independent	Trevor Mumford	289	0.42	+0.42
Total formal votes		69,106	96.94	−0.77
Informal votes		2,178	3.06	+0.77
Turnout		71,284	94.02	−0.87
Two-party-preferred result
Liberal	Peter Slipper	42,152	61.00	−9.64
Labor	Ray O'Donnell	26,954	39.00	+9.64
Liberal hold		Swing	−9.64	

=== Forde ===
1998 Australian federal election: Forde
Party	Candidate	Votes	%	±%
Liberal	Kay Elson	29,358	42.74	+0.29
Labor	Peter Keech	22,431	32.66	+0.87
One Nation	Adrian Dean	11,746	17.10	+17.10
Democrats	Alan Dickson	3,093	4.50	−3.47
Greens	Daniel Habermann	1,546	2.25	−0.15
Family Law Reform	Geoff Daniels	286	0.42	+0.42
Citizens Electoral Council	Danny Hope	229	0.33	+0.33
Total formal votes		68,689	96.00	−1.33
Informal votes		2,863	4.00	+1.33
Turnout		71,552	93.23	−0.28
Two-party-preferred result
Liberal	Kay Elson	37,948	55.25	−6.76
Labor	Peter Keech	30,741	44.75	+6.76
Liberal hold		Swing	−6.76	

=== Griffith ===
1998 Australian federal election: Griffith
Party	Candidate	Votes	%	±%
Labor	Kevin Rudd	35,121	44.17	+2.82
Liberal	Graeme McDougall	32,018	40.26	−3.52
One Nation	Neil Jorgensen	5,546	6.97	+6.97
Democrats	Iain Renton	3,920	4.93	−1.28
Greens	Greg George	2,108	2.65	+0.08
Women's Party	Jeni Eastwood	807	1.01	−0.23
Total formal votes		79,520	97.56	−0.04
Informal votes		1,986	2.44	+0.04
Turnout		81,506	94.45	−0.31
Two-party-preferred result
Labor	Kevin Rudd	41,689	52.43	+3.93
Liberal	Graeme McDougall	37,831	47.57	−3.93
Labor gain from Liberal		Swing	+3.93	

=== Groom ===
1998 Australian federal election: Groom
Party	Candidate	Votes	%	±%
Liberal	Ian Macfarlane	24,631	33.07	−24.99
Labor	Geoff Brown	18,787	25.23	+3.11
One Nation	Avril Baynes	13,382	17.97	+17.97
National	Bruce Green	11,335	15.22	+8.02
Democrats	Glenn Polson	1,993	2.68	−2.99
Independent	Cynthia Mayne	1,629	2.19	+2.19
Christian Democrats	Paul Harry	1,409	1.89	+1.89
Greens	Sarah Moles	1,307	1.75	−0.38
Total formal votes		74,473	97.26	−0.43
Informal votes		2,100	2.74	+0.43
Turnout		76,573	95.27	−0.26
Two-party-preferred result
Liberal	Ian Macfarlane	46,951	63.04	−8.25
Labor	Geoff Brown	27,522	36.96	+8.25
Liberal hold		Swing	−8.25	

=== Herbert ===
1998 Australian federal election: Herbert
Party	Candidate	Votes	%	±%
Liberal	Peter Lindsay	30,683	39.91	+1.28
Labor	Ted Lindsay	28,588	37.19	+0.64
One Nation	Mark Swain	10,991	14.30	+14.30
Democrats	Althea Smith	1,979	2.57	−3.37
Greens	Rebecca Smith	1,747	2.27	+2.27
Christian Democrats	John Edmiston	948	1.23	+1.23
Independent	Elaine Steley	816	1.06	+1.06
Women's Party	Pauline Woodbridge	619	0.81	−0.93
Independent	Bob Bradley	503	0.65	+0.65
Total formal votes		76,874	96.13	−1.30
Informal votes		3,091	3.87	+1.30
Turnout		79,965	94.68	−0.56
Two-party-preferred result
Liberal	Peter Lindsay	38,512	50.10	−6.52
Labor	Ted Lindsay	38,362	49.90	+6.52
Liberal hold		Swing	−6.52	

=== Hinkler ===
1998 Australian federal election: Hinkler
Party	Candidate	Votes	%	±%
Labor	Cheryl Dorron	29,021	40.11	+1.86
National	Paul Neville	26,471	36.58	−16.07
One Nation	Marcus Ringuet	13,739	18.99	+18.99
Democrats	Lance Hall	1,677	2.32	−2.84
Greens	Roy Pearce	1,139	1.57	+1.54
Citizens Electoral Council	Cindy Rolls	309	0.43	+0.43
Total formal votes		72,356	96.82	−0.71
Informal votes		2,379	3.18	+0.71
Turnout		74,735	95.40	−0.06
Two-party-preferred result
National	Paul Neville	36,423	50.34	−7.60
Labor	Cheryl Dorron	35,933	49.66	+7.60
National hold		Swing	−7.60	

=== Kennedy ===
1998 Australian federal election: Kennedy
Party	Candidate	Votes	%	±%
National	Bob Katter	33,355	44.12	−12.56
Labor	Kenneth Stark	22,110	29.25	−0.23
One Nation	Jayson Dalton	14,240	18.84	+18.84
Independent	Greg Pohlmann	2,219	2.94	+2.94
Democrats	Alan Isherwood	1,907	2.52	−4.05
Greens	Ken Parker	1,033	1.37	−1.01
Independent	Steve Theodore	476	0.63	+0.63
Citizens Electoral Council	Judy Harris	255	0.34	+0.34
Total formal votes		75,595	96.22	−0.82
Informal votes		2,971	3.78	+0.82
Turnout		78,566	93.15	−0.50
Two-party-preferred result
National	Bob Katter	46,254	61.19	−2.97
Labor	Kenneth Stark	29,341	38.81	+2.97
National hold		Swing	−2.97	

=== Leichhardt ===
1998 Australian federal election: Leichhardt
Party	Candidate	Votes	%	±%
Liberal	Warren Entsch	29,550	41.45	+9.36
Labor	Chris Lewis	26,361	36.98	−1.48
One Nation	Beth Hudson	9,904	13.89	+13.89
Democrats	Harold Salier	2,243	3.15	−1.64
Greens	Steven Nowakowski	2,056	2.88	+0.00
Independent	Steve Dimitriou	522	0.73	−0.44
Independent	Rob Kenyon	267	0.37	+0.37
Independent	Trudy Alberts	218	0.31	+0.31
Independent	Rata Hami Pugh	173	0.24	+0.24
Total formal votes		71,294	96.04	−1.13
Informal votes		2,938	3.96	+1.13
Turnout		74,232	91.97	−0.35
Two-party-preferred result
Liberal	Warren Entsch	38,535	54.05	−0.52
Labor	Chris Lewis	32,759	45.95	+0.52
Liberal hold		Swing	−0.52	

=== Lilley ===
1998 Australian federal election: Lilley
Party	Candidate	Votes	%	±%
Labor	Wayne Swan	35,617	45.16	+2.02
Liberal	Elizabeth Grace	30,185	38.28	−7.83
One Nation	Warren Bray	6,702	8.50	+8.50
Democrats	Kirsty Fraser	3,863	4.90	−1.72
Greens	Sue Meehan	1,785	2.26	−0.57
Christian Democrats	Gerard O'Keeffe	711	0.90	+0.90
Total formal votes		78,863	97.24	−0.70
Informal votes		2,239	2.76	+0.70
Turnout		81,102	94.37	−0.19
Two-party-preferred result
Labor	Wayne Swan	41,902	53.13	+3.51
Liberal	Elizabeth Grace	36,961	46.87	−3.51
Labor gain from Liberal		Swing	+3.51	

=== Longman ===
1998 Australian federal election: Longman
Party	Candidate	Votes	%	±%
Liberal	Mal Brough	27,161	38.93	−1.27
Labor	Ian Burgett	24,254	34.77	+2.62
One Nation	Gavin Badke	12,663	18.15	+18.15
Democrats	Paul Barnes	3,477	4.98	−2.53
Greens	John Langford	2,206	3.16	−0.11
Total formal votes		69,761	97.11	−0.12
Informal votes		2,076	2.89	+0.12
Turnout		71,837	94.66	−0.92
Two-party-preferred result
Liberal	Mal Brough	35,525	50.92	−8.98
Labor	Ian Burgett	34,236	49.08	+8.98
Liberal hold		Swing	−8.98	

=== Maranoa ===
1998 Australian federal election: Maranoa
Party	Candidate	Votes	%	±%
National	Bruce Scott	34,075	45.19	−21.48
Labor	Elizabeth Pommer	18,936	25.11	+1.14
One Nation	Robyn Cadzow	16,892	22.40	+22.40
Democrats	Regina Gleeson	2,114	2.80	−3.16
Independent	Lorraine Wheeldon	2,076	2.75	+2.75
Greens	Kim Olsen	1,066	1.41	+1.29
Citizens Electoral Council	Peter Miller	243	0.32	+0.32
Total formal votes		75,402	96.24	−0.80
Informal votes		2,944	3.76	+0.80
Turnout		78,346	94.58	−0.81
Two-party-preferred result
National	Bruce Scott	48,576	64.42	−7.07
Labor	Elizabeth Pommer	26,826	35.58	+7.07
National hold		Swing	−7.07	

=== McPherson ===
1998 Australian federal election: McPherson
Party	Candidate	Votes	%	±%
Liberal	Margaret May	33,329	45.17	−16.39
Labor	Robert Poole	24,441	33.12	+6.96
One Nation	Peter Murphy	7,065	9.58	+9.58
National	Ted Shepherd	3,190	4.32	+4.30
Democrats	Lynne Grimsey	2,826	3.83	−2.61
Greens	John Palmer	2,390	3.24	−1.25
Independent	Kevin Goodwin	544	0.74	−0.18
Total formal votes		73,785	95.80	−1.39
Informal votes		3,235	4.20	+1.39
Turnout		77,020	93.81	−0.14
Two-party-preferred result
Liberal	Margaret May	43,045	58.34	−8.82
Labor	Robert Poole	30,740	41.66	+8.82
Liberal hold		Swing	−8.82	

=== Moncrieff ===
1998 Australian federal election: Moncrieff
Party	Candidate	Votes	%	±%
Liberal	Kathy Sullivan	37,527	51.88	−13.10
Labor	Anne Bennett	21,055	29.11	+6.43
One Nation	Warren Fenton	7,357	10.17	+10.17
Democrats	Colin O'Brien	2,610	3.61	−1.57
Greens	Sally Spain	2,175	3.01	−1.77
Christian Democrats	Julie Falcke	1,615	2.23	+1.54
Total formal votes		72,339	95.52	−1.46
Informal votes		3,394	4.48	+1.46
Turnout		75,733	92.67	−0.51
Two-party-preferred result
Liberal	Kathy Sullivan	45,450	62.83	−7.63
Labor	Anne Bennett	26,889	37.17	+7.63
Liberal hold		Swing	−7.63	

=== Moreton ===
1998 Australian federal election: Moreton
Party	Candidate	Votes	%	±%
Liberal	Gary Hardgrave	33,724	43.12	−7.76
Labor	Kathleen Brookes	31,227	39.93	+3.99
One Nation	Vanessa Stewart	5,626	7.19	+7.19
Democrats	Anthony Lee	4,046	5.17	−1.71
Greens	Lenore Taylor	2,627	3.36	+0.08
Christian Democrats	Jim Vote	959	1.23	+1.23
Total formal votes		78,209	96.97	−0.34
Informal votes		2,444	3.03	+0.34
Turnout		80,653	94.26	−0.57
Two-party-preferred result
Liberal	Gary Hardgrave	39,554	50.57	−5.40
Labor	Kathleen Brookes	38,655	49.43	+5.40
Liberal hold		Swing	−5.40	

=== Oxley ===
1998 Australian federal election: Oxley
Party	Candidate	Votes	%	±%
Labor	Bernie Ripoll	32,770	45.75	+1.80
Liberal	Maria Forbes	17,538	24.48	−18.96
One Nation	Colene Hughes	12,653	17.66	+17.66
Independent	Anne Scott	3,053	4.26	+4.26
Democrats	Kate Kunzelmann	2,773	3.87	−2.75
Greens	John McKeon	1,200	1.68	−0.97
Family Law Reform	Simon Trencher	689	0.96	+0.96
Independent	Dele Rule	614	0.86	+0.86
Independent	Xuan Thu Nguyen	338	0.47	+0.47
Total formal votes		71,628	95.57	−1.20
Informal votes		3,324	4.43	+1.20
Turnout		74,952	94.60	−0.34
Two-party-preferred result
Labor	Bernie Ripoll	41,691	58.20	+7.85
Liberal	Maria Forbes	29,937	41.80	−7.85
Labor notional hold		Swing	+7.85	

=== Petrie ===
1998 Australian federal election: Petrie
Party	Candidate	Votes	%	±%
Liberal	Teresa Gambaro	32,994	42.37	−9.19
Labor	Rosemary Hume	30,882	39.66	+3.60
One Nation	Raymond Bower	8,637	11.09	+11.09
Democrats	Pamela Stowell	3,962	5.09	−1.42
Greens	Peter Burgoyne	1,395	1.79	−0.80
Total formal votes		77,870	97.41	−0.17
Informal votes		2,072	2.59	+0.17
Turnout		79,942	94.68	−0.36
Two-party-preferred result
Liberal	Teresa Gambaro	39,522	50.75	−7.52
Labor	Rosemary Hume	38,348	49.25	+7.52
Liberal hold		Swing	−7.52	

=== Rankin ===
1998 Australian federal election: Rankin
Party	Candidate	Votes	%	±%
Labor	Craig Emerson	32,924	47.48	+4.91
Liberal	Cuong Bui	20,736	29.91	−12.67
One Nation	Ron Frood	8,749	12.62	+12.62
Democrats	Robert Hernandez	2,923	4.22	−4.37
Christian Democrats	Ann Hage	1,556	2.24	+2.24
Greens	Sara van Tinteren	1,536	2.22	−0.74
Independent	Brian Norton	456	0.66	+0.66
Independent	Lorraine Barnes	456	0.66	+0.66
Total formal votes		69,336	95.55	−1.27
Informal votes		3,228	4.45	+1.27
Turnout		72,564	93.07	−0.44
Two-party-preferred result
Labor	Craig Emerson	40,691	58.69	+9.07
Liberal	Cuong Bui	28,645	41.31	−9.07
Labor gain from Liberal		Swing	+9.07	

=== Ryan ===
1998 Australian federal election: Ryan
Party	Candidate	Votes	%	±%
Liberal	John Moore	38,785	50.40	−9.17
Labor	Teresa Farruggio	23,350	30.35	+5.00
Democrats	Lyn Dengate	6,139	7.98	−2.00
One Nation	Alan Smith	4,032	5.24	+5.24
Greens	Brian Hoepper	2,945	3.83	+0.62
Independent	Peter Mackenzie	1,186	1.54	+1.54
Independent	Alan Skyring	353	0.46	−0.59
Australia First	John Barker	158	0.21	+0.21
Total formal votes		76,948	97.69	−0.53
Informal votes		1,822	2.31	+0.53
Turnout		78,770	94.39	−0.80
Two-party-preferred result
Liberal	John Moore	45,799	59.52	−7.46
Labor	Teresa Farruggio	31,149	40.48	+7.46
Liberal hold		Swing	−7.46	

=== Wide Bay ===
1998 Australian federal election: Wide Bay
Party	Candidate	Votes	%	±%
National	Warren Truss	22,569	31.46	−27.78
Labor	Russ Tremlin	20,391	28.42	+1.05
One Nation	Graeme Wicks	18,891	26.33	+26.33
Liberal	Desley Fraser	5,937	8.28	+7.79
Democrats	Phil Rodhouse	1,552	2.16	−4.75
Independent	Bob Postle	1,480	2.06	+2.06
Greens	Richard Nielsen	917	1.28	+1.21
Total formal votes		71,737	96.73	−0.41
Informal votes		2,427	3.27	+0.41
Turnout		74,164	95.07	−0.85
Two-party-preferred result
National	Warren Truss	37,923	52.86	−15.32
Labor	Russ Tremlin	33,814	47.14	+15.32
National hold		Swing	−15.32	

== See also ==
- Results of the 1998 Australian federal election (House of Representatives)
- Members of the Australian House of Representatives, 1998–2001
