= Results of the 2004 Australian federal election in Queensland =

2004 Australian federal election (Queensland)
← 2001	9 October 2004	2007 →

All 28 Queensland seats in the Australian House of Representatives and 6 seats in the Australian Senate

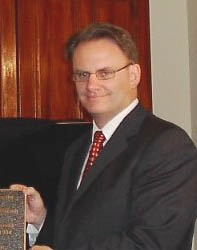
	First party	Second party
Leader	John Howard	Mark Latham
Party	Liberal/National coalition	Labor
Last election	20 seats	7 seats
Seats won	21 seats	6 seats
Seat change	▲1	▼1
Popular vote	1,081,813	765,507
Percentage	49.15%	34.75%
Swing	▲3.56	▲0.08
TPP	57.09%	42.91%
TPP swing	▲2.23	▼2.23

This is a list of electoral division results for the Australian 2004 federal election in the state of Queensland.

== Overall results ==
Turnout 94.84% (CV) — Informal 5.16%
Party	Votes	%	Swing	Seats	Change
Liberal	867,289	39.41	+ 2.95	17	▲1
National	214,522	9.75	+0.61	4	Steady
Liberal/National Coalition	1,081,811	49.15	+3.55	21	▲1
Labor	765,507	34.78	+0.08	6	▼1
Greens	111,314	5.06	+1.57		
Family First	80,820	3.67	+3.67		
One Nation	43,619	1.98	–5.09		
Democrats	30,255	1.37	–2.94		
Citizens Electoral Council	7,872	0.36	+ 0.22		
New Country	3,990	0.18	+0.18		
Great Australians	2,824	0.13	+0.13		
Socialist Alliance	1,251	0.06	+0.06		
HEMP	787	0.04	–0.01		
Ex-Service, Service and Veterans	734	0.03	+0.03		
Independents	70,104	3.18	–1.45		
Total	2,320,717			28	
Two-party-preferred vote
Liberal/National Coalition	1,256,533	57.09	+2.23	21	▲1
Labor	944,355	42.91	–2.23	6	▼1
Invalid/blank votes	119,829	5.16	+0.33		
Registered voters/turnout	2,475,611	93.74			
Source: AEC Tally Room

The Labor Party returned poor polling in the state, especially considering it was enjoying strong results at a state level through to 2004. Indeed, Labor recorded some of its lowest primary vote numbers in this state since the party's foundation in this election, while the Liberal party recorded some of its strongest. Queensland was the poorest state electorally for the Greens, while One Nation also suffered a 5.1% reduction in their primary vote.

== Results by division ==
=== Blair ===
2004 Australian federal election: Blair
Party	Candidate	Votes	%	±%
Liberal	Cameron Thompson	42,683	52.19	+8.28
Labor	Shayne Neumann	25,709	31.44	+1.06
One Nation	David Chidgey	4,330	5.29	−9.69
Family First	Priscilla Smith	2,982	3.65	+3.65
Greens	Sarai E O'Reilly-Reis	2,406	2.94	−0.20
New Country	Alan Price	1,691	2.07	+2.07
Democrats	Neal McKenzie	1,049	1.28	−2.32
Great Australians	John Bennett	473	0.58	+0.56
Citizens Electoral Council	Rodney Stapleton	458	0.56	+0.29
Total formal votes		81,781	94.22	−0.47
Informal votes		5,019	5.78	+0.47
Turnout		86,800	94.83	−1.09
Two-party-preferred result
Liberal	Cameron Thompson	50,057	61.21	+4.59
Labor	Shayne Neumann	31,724	38.79	−4.59
Liberal hold		Swing	+4.59	

=== Bonner ===
2004 Australian federal election: Bonner
Party	Candidate	Votes	%	±%
Liberal	Ross Vasta	34,334	44.13	+1.74
Labor	Con Sciacca	33,261	42.75	−2.08
Greens	Elissa Jenkins	3,836	4.93	+1.92
Family First	Trevor Hunt	3,393	4.36	+4.36
One Nation	Barry Myatt	1,436	1.85	−1.87
Democrats	Chad Smith	1,090	1.40	−3.09
Citizens Electoral Council	William Wheeler	451	0.58	+0.58
Total formal votes		77,801	94.36	−1.35
Informal votes		4,651	5.64	+1.35
Turnout		82,452	94.74	−1.14
Two-party-preferred result
Liberal	Ross Vasta	39,298	50.51	+2.40
Labor	Con Sciacca	38,503	49.49	−2.40
Liberal notional gain from Labor		Swing	+2.40	

=== Bowman ===
2004 Australian federal election: Bowman
Party	Candidate	Votes	%	±%
Liberal	Andrew Laming	39,363	50.59	+7.53
Labor	Donna Webster	27,631	35.51	−8.93
Greens	Paula Nadas	3,729	4.79	+2.18
Family First	Mal Cayley	3,126	4.02	+4.02
National	Joe Ross	3,125	4.02	+4.02
Democrats	Robert H Bromwich	835	1.07	−3.62
Total formal votes		77,809	95.04	+0.18
Informal votes		4,063	4.96	−0.18
Turnout		81,872	94.51	−0.04
Two-party-preferred result
Liberal	Andrew Laming	46,004	59.12	+6.0
Labor	Donna Webster	31,805	40.88	−6.0
Liberal notional hold		Swing	+6.0	

The sitting member was Con Sciacca (Labor) however the redistribution had resulted in a notional Liberal majority of 3.1% and Sciacca contested the new seat of Bonner.

=== Brisbane ===
2004 Australian federal election: Brisbane
Party	Candidate	Votes	%	±%
Labor	Arch Bevis	33,687	42.47	+4.83
Liberal	Ingrid Tall	31,721	39.99	−1.22
Greens	Richard Nielsen	7,349	9.26	+2.70
National	Nick Withycombe	2,242	2.83	+1.01
Family First	Charles Newington	1,899	2.39	+2.39
Democrats	Tracy Schrader	1,269	1.60	−7.07
Independent	J F Barnes	767	0.97	+0.97
Socialist Alliance	Coral Wynter	313	0.39	+0.39
Citizens Electoral Council	Nick Contarino	76	0.10	+0.10
Total formal votes		79,323	95.78	−0.48
Informal votes		3,495	4.22	+0.48
Turnout		82,818	92.40	−1.18
Two-party-preferred result
Labor	Arch Bevis	42,759	53.90	+2.87
Liberal	Ingrid Tall	36,564	46.10	−2.87
Labor hold		Swing	+2.87	

=== Capricornia ===
2004 Australian federal election: Capricornia
Party	Candidate	Votes	%	±%
Labor	Kirsten Livermore	38,984	47.21	+0.07
National	John Lever	22,719	27.51	+3.14
Liberal	Di Kuntschik	10,938	13.25	−1.27
Family First	Alan J Spackman	3,424	4.15	+4.15
One Nation	Larry H Coleman	2,575	3.12	−4.81
Greens	Michael Kane	1,690	2.05	+0.54
Democrats	Naomi Johns	1,185	1.44	−0.47
HEMP	Judy Canales	787	0.95	+0.95
Citizens Electoral Council	Bill Ingrey	273	0.33	−0.52
Total formal votes		82,575	95.75	−0.10
Informal votes		3,664	4.25	+0.10
Turnout		86,239	94.74	−1.79
Two-party-preferred result
Labor	Kirsten Livermore	45,531	55.14	−0.38
National	John Lever	37,044	44.86	+0.38
Labor hold		Swing	−0.38	

=== Dawson ===
2004 Australian federal election: Dawson
Party	Candidate	Votes	%	±%
National	De-Anne Kelly	39,409	48.16	−2.06
Labor	Cherry Feeney	25,626	31.32	−2.45
Independent	Margaret F Menzel	5,647	6.90	+6.90
Greens	Tony W Fontes	2,606	3.19	+0.74
One Nation	Lewis Arroita	2,572	3.14	−5.45
Family First	Bev Smith	2,435	2.98	+2.98
Citizens Electoral Council	Jan Pukallus	2,192	2.68	+1.81
Democrats	Archie Julien	690	0.84	−1.93
New Country	Debbie Lowis	645	0.79	+0.79
Total formal votes		81,819	94.59	−0.69
Informal votes		4,683	5.41	+0.69
Turnout		86,502	94.42	−2.24
Two-party-preferred result
National	De-Anne Kelly	49,399	60.38	+2.39
Labor	Cherry Feeney	32,420	39.62	−2.39
National hold		Swing	+2.39	

=== Dickson ===
2004 Australian federal election: Dickson
Party	Candidate	Votes	%	±%
Liberal	Peter Dutton	39,810	52.09	+6.55
Labor	Craig McConnell	27,036	35.37	+2.18
Greens	Howard Robert Nielsen	4,485	5.87	+2.35
Family First	Dale Shuttleworth	3,454	4.52	+4.52
Democrats	Kirsty Reye	1,270	1.66	−3.64
Great Australians	Terry Hyland	373	0.49	+0.49
Total formal votes		76,428	95.40	+1.12
Informal votes		3,684	4.60	−1.12
Turnout		80,112	95.14	+0.92
Two-party-preferred result
Liberal	Peter Dutton	44,199	57.83	+1.81
Labor	Craig McConnell	32,229	42.17	−1.81
Liberal hold		Swing	+1.81	

=== Fadden ===
2004 Australian federal election: Fadden
Party	Candidate	Votes	%	±%
Liberal	David Jull	42,328	59.56	+6.18
Labor	Peter Eather	19,919	28.03	+0.04
Greens	Willy Bach	3,011	4.24	+0.96
Family First	Lyn Rees	2,680	3.77	+3.77
One Nation	John Walter	1,428	2.01	−5.22
Democrats	Suzanne Wilson	1,109	1.56	−2.65
Citizens Electoral Council	Ken Martin	598	0.84	+0.84
Total formal votes		71,073	93.83	+0.27
Informal votes		4,672	6.17	−0.27
Turnout		75,745	92.21	+1.90
Two-party-preferred result
Liberal	David Jull	46,393	65.28	+2.16
Labor	Peter Eather	24,680	34.72	−2.16
Liberal hold		Swing	+2.16	

=== Fairfax ===
2004 Australian federal election: Fairfax
Party	Candidate	Votes	%	±%
Liberal	Alex Somlyay	39,075	52.30	+4.38
Labor	Ivan Molloy	20,289	27.15	+1.69
Greens	David Norris	7,536	10.09	+4.61
Family First	Paula Hunt	3,390	4.54	+4.54
One Nation	Patrick Rozanski	2,317	3.10	−3.94
Democrats	Debbie Campbell	1,896	2.54	−2.40
Citizens Electoral Council	Kev Watt	216	0.29	+0.29
Total formal votes		74,719	94.74	−0.95
Informal votes		4,145	5.26	+0.95
Turnout		78,864	93.44	+1.03
Two-party-preferred result
Liberal	Alex Somlyay	45,452	60.83	+1.65
Labor	Ivan Molloy	29,267	39.17	−1.65
Liberal hold		Swing	+1.65	

=== Fisher ===
2004 Australian federal election: Fisher
Party	Candidate	Votes	%	±%
Liberal	Peter Slipper	42,651	55.87	+3.85
Labor	John Gray	22,011	28.84	+3.46
Greens	Robert Muston	4,617	6.05	+1.87
Family First	Ronald Stuart Hill	3,174	4.16	+4.16
One Nation	Kevin J Savage	1,929	2.53	−4.88
Democrats	Craig Wilmot	1,201	1.57	−2.20
Great Australians	Liz Hays	748	0.98	+0.98
Total formal votes		76,321	94.64	−0.94
Informal votes		4,320	5.36	+0.94
Turnout		80,641	93.78	+0.74
Two-party-preferred result
Liberal	Peter Slipper	48,068	62.98	+1.21
Labor	John Gray	28,253	37.02	−1.21
Liberal hold		Swing	+1.21	

=== Forde ===
2004 Australian federal election: Forde
Party	Candidate	Votes	%	±%
Liberal	Kay Elson	41,335	54.81	+5.60
Labor	Sean Leader	23,382	31.00	−2.35
Greens	Daniel Lloyd	3,076	4.08	+1.07
Family First	Shereen Hinds	2,986	3.96	+3.96
One Nation	Aaron Heaps	2,935	3.89	−5.87
Democrats	Anita Martin	1,018	1.35	−3.29
	David Gordon Howse	515	0.68	+0.68
Citizens Electoral Council	Daniel Hope	171	0.23	+0.23
Total formal votes		75,418	93.62	−0.59
Informal votes		5,143	6.38	+0.59
Turnout		80,561	93.30	+0.50
Two-party-preferred result
Liberal	Kay Elson	47,502	62.98	+6.00
Labor	Sean Leader	27,916	37.02	−6.00
Liberal hold		Swing	+6.00	

=== Griffith ===
2004 Australian federal election: Griffith
Party	Candidate	Votes	%	±%
Labor	Kevin Rudd	39,247	48.74	+3.20
Liberal	Janelle Payne	30,032	37.30	−0.44
Greens	Darryl Rosin	7,237	8.99	+3.55
Family First	James Turner	1,572	1.95	+1.95
Democrats	Bruce Carnwell	1,084	1.35	−1.59
Independent	Derek Rosborough	768	0.95	+0.95
Socialist Alliance	Lynda Hansen	580	0.72	+0.72
Total formal votes		80,520	95.74	−0.15
Informal votes		3,585	4.26	+0.15
Turnout		84,105	92.47	−2.46
Two-party-preferred result
Labor	Kevin Rudd	47,207	58.63	+2.48
Liberal	Janelle Payne	33,313	41.37	−2.48
Labor hold		Swing	+2.48	

=== Groom ===
2004 Australian federal election: Groom
Party	Candidate	Votes	%	±%
Liberal	Ian Macfarlane	49,131	60.36	+13.50
Labor	Paul King	19,516	23.98	+0.32
Family First	Peter Findlay	5,168	6.35	+6.35
Greens	Karey Harrison	3,252	4.00	+0.45
Independent	Rod Jeanneret	1,929	2.37	+2.37
Great Australians	Noel Wieck	1,230	1.51	+1.51
Democrats	Christoph Donges	860	1.06	−2.17
Citizens Electoral Council	Oliver Carter	310	0.38	+0.38
Total formal votes		81,396	96.00	−0.57
Informal votes		3,392	4.00	+0.57
Turnout		84,788	94.69	−1.98
Two-party-preferred result
Liberal	Ian Macfarlane	56,121	68.95	+3.86
Labor	Paul King	25,275	31.05	−3.86
Liberal hold		Swing	+3.86	

=== Herbert ===
2004 Australian federal election: Herbert
Party	Candidate	Votes	%	±%
Liberal	Peter Lindsay	38,792	49.74	+6.80
Labor	Anita Phillips	28,260	36.24	−0.31
Greens	Jenny Stirling	3,915	5.02	+2.30
Family First	Cathy Eaton	2,993	3.84	+3.84
One Nation	William Michael Brennan	2,675	3.43	−3.36
Democrats	Richard Hoolihan	1,025	1.31	−1.79
Citizens Electoral Council	Les Marsden	323	0.41	+0.41
Total formal votes		77,983	94.47	−0.66
Informal votes		4,563	5.53	+0.66
Turnout		82,546	93.82	−2.18
Two-party-preferred result
Liberal	Peter Lindsay	43,828	56.20	+4.67
Labor	Anita Phillips	34,155	43.80	−4.67
Liberal hold		Swing	+4.67	

=== Hinkler ===
2004 Australian federal election: Hinkler
Party	Candidate	Votes	%	±%
National	Paul Neville	40,040	47.23	+6.62
Labor	Cheryl Dorron	33,167	39.13	+3.17
Family First	Cameron Rub	4,010	4.73	+4.73
Greens	Greg George	2,824	3.33	+0.83
Independent	Roy Wells	2,782	3.28	+3.28
Democrats	Alison Jensen	906	1.07	−0.78
Veterans	Tracey Zerk	734	0.87	+0.87
Citizens Electoral Council	Cindy Rolls	306	0.36	+0.30
Total formal votes		84,769	95.46	−0.04
Informal votes		4,033	4.54	+0.04
Turnout		88,802	94.61	−1.27
Two-party-preferred result
National	Paul Neville	46,458	54.81	+2.66
Labor	Cheryl Dorron	38,311	45.19	−2.66
National hold		Swing	+2.66	

=== Kennedy ===
2004 Australian federal election: Kennedy
Party	Candidate	Votes	%	±%
Independent	Bob Katter	32,688	40.13	−3.22
National	James Doyle	19,413	23.83	+10.76
Labor	Alan Neilan	19,296	23.69	−0.49
One Nation	Bill Hankin	3,698	4.54	−5.39
Greens	Angela Jones	2,879	3.53	+1.40
Family First	Keith Douglas	2,592	3.18	+3.18
Democrats	Terry Hennessey	575	0.71	−2.28
Citizens Electoral Council	Judith A Harris	316	0.39	+0.11
Total formal votes		81,457	95.56	+0.29
Informal votes		3,782	4.44	−0.29
Turnout		85,239	92.56	−2.79
Notional two-party-preferred count
National	James Doyle	48,022	58.95	+0.5
Labor	Alan Neilan	33,435	41.05	−0.5
Two-candidate-preferred result
Independent	Bob Katter	56,109	68.88	−0.30
Labor	Alan Neilan	25,348	31.12	+0.30
Independent hold		Swing	−0.30	

=== Leichhardt ===
2004 Australian federal election: Leichhardt
Party	Candidate	Votes	%	±%
Liberal	Warren Entsch	41,377	53.35	+4.59
Labor	Jim Turnour	24,305	31.34	−1.83
Greens	Neville St John-Wood	5,020	6.47	+1.23
Independent	Jen Sackley	3,789	4.89	+4.89
Family First	Ric Lippmann	2,100	2.71	+2.71
Democrats	Allen Reid	972	1.25	−2.31
Total formal votes		77,563	93.97	−0.11
Informal votes		4,976	6.03	+0.11
Turnout		82,539	91.16	−2.89
Two-party-preferred result
Liberal	Warren Entsch	46,541	60.00	+3.61
Labor	Jim Turnour	31,022	40.00	−3.61
Liberal hold		Swing	+3.61	

=== Lilley ===
2004 Australian federal election: Lilley
Party	Candidate	Votes	%	±%
Labor	Wayne Swan	40,234	48.88	+2.08
Liberal	Alan Boulton	33,902	41.19	+1.13
Greens	Sue Meehan	4,630	5.63	+1.88
Family First	Brad Hill	2,314	2.81	+2.81
Democrats	Dawn Forsyth	1,230	1.49	−4.21
Total formal votes		82,310	95.35	−0.92
Informal votes		4,014	4.65	+0.92
Turnout		86,324	93.69	−3.10
Two-party-preferred result
Labor	Wayne Swan	45,493	55.27	+0.70
Liberal	Alan Boulton	36,817	44.73	−0.70
Labor hold		Swing	+0.70	

=== Longman ===
2004 Australian federal election: Longman
Party	Candidate	Votes	%	±%
Liberal	Mal Brough	40,345	51.87	+6.64
Labor	Stephen Beckett	27,790	35.73	−1.42
Greens	Philip Kimmet	3,096	3.98	+1.00
One Nation	Susan Meredith	3,017	3.88	−4.49
Family First	Tom Lew	2,187	2.81	+2.81
Democrats	Jacqueline Kennedy	1,339	1.72	−2.18
Total formal votes		77,774	94.36	−0.29
Informal votes		4,646	5.64	+0.29
Turnout		82,420	94.50	+1.24
Two-party-preferred result
Liberal	Mal Brough	44,848	57.66	+5.14
Labor	Stephen Beckett	32,926	42.34	−5.14
Liberal hold		Swing	+5.14	

=== Maranoa ===
2004 Australian federal election: Maranoa
Party	Candidate	Votes	%	±%
National	Bruce Scott	47,846	60.51	+7.40
Labor	Shane Guley	17,636	22.30	−1.84
One Nation	Santo Ferraro	3,535	4.47	−10.13
Family First	Stephen Moloney	3,067	3.88	+3.88
Independent	Philip Black	2,570	3.25	+3.25
New Country	Rick Benham	1,654	2.09	+2.09
Greens	Jonathan Rihan	1,580	2.00	+0.08
Democrats	Greg Ridge	903	1.14	−2.54
Citizens Electoral Council	David Klingsporn	280	0.35	−0.43
Total formal votes		79,071	95.24	−0.08
Informal votes		3,955	4.76	+0.08
Turnout		83,026	94.48	−1.72
Two-party-preferred result
National	Bruce Scott	56,085	70.93	+5.55
Labor	Shane Guley	22,986	29.07	−5.55
National hold		Swing	+5.55	

=== McPherson ===
2004 Australian federal election: McPherson
Party	Candidate	Votes	%	±%
Liberal	Margaret May	43,124	58.95	+4.06
Labor	Kellie Trigger	22,037	30.13	+1.37
Greens	Ian Latto	3,789	5.18	+0.25
Family First	Rob Davey	2,063	2.82	+2.82
One Nation	Paul Lewis	1,347	1.84	−4.21
Democrats	Russell White	788	1.08	−3.02
Total formal votes		73,148	94.73	−0.01
Informal votes		4,069	5.27	+0.01
Turnout		77,217	93.16	+1.69
Two-party-preferred result
Liberal	Margaret May	46,737	63.89	+1.72
Labor	Kellie Trigger	26,411	36.11	−1.72
Liberal hold		Swing	+1.72	

=== Moncrieff ===
2004 Australian federal election: Moncrieff
Party	Candidate	Votes	%	±%
Liberal	Steven Ciobo	46,817	64.38	+10.89
Labor	David Parrish	17,393	23.92	−0.33
Greens	Michael Beale	3,620	4.98	+0.72
Family First	James Tayler	2,186	3.01	+3.01
One Nation	Mark Chapman Smith	1,230	1.69	−3.75
Democrats	Ros Roberts	834	1.15	−3.08
Citizens Electoral Council	Sandy Sanderson	641	0.88	+0.88
Total formal votes		72,721	94.07	+0.92
Informal votes		4,581	5.93	−0.92
Turnout		77,302	91.69	−2.17
Two-party-preferred result
Liberal	Steven Ciobo	51,003	70.14	+3.80
Labor	David Parrish	21,718	29.86	−3.80
Liberal hold		Swing	+3.80	

=== Moreton ===
2004 Australian federal election: Moreton
Party	Candidate	Votes	%	±%
Liberal	Gary Hardgrave	38,708	49.11	+1.90
Labor	Graham Perrett	30,828	39.12	+0.14
Greens	Jane Williamson	4,182	5.31	+1.47
Family First	Terence Tam	2,142	2.72	+2.72
Democrats	Frederika Steen	1,307	1.66	−3.80
One Nation	Barry Weedon	846	1.07	−2.37
Independent	Andrew Lamb	799	1.01	−0.06
Total formal votes		78,812	95.06	−0.16
Informal votes		4,096	4.94	+0.16
Turnout		82,908	93.87	−1.30
Two-party-preferred result
Liberal	Gary Hardgrave	42,694	54.17	+1.61
Labor	Graham Perrett	36,118	45.83	−1.61
Liberal hold		Swing	+1.61	

=== Oxley ===
2004 Australian federal election: Oxley
Party	Candidate	Votes	%	±%
Labor	Bernie Ripoll	39,807	50.47	+1.19
Liberal	Daniel Smith	26,528	33.63	+1.77
Greens	Kevin Brennan	3,474	4.40	+1.05
Family First	Robert Boyne	2,906	3.68	+3.68
One Nation	Bill Flynn	2,100	2.66	−6.23
Independent	George Pugh	1,920	2.43	+2.43
Democrats	Nicholas Wood	903	1.14	−4.30
Citizens Electoral Council	Brian Haag	881	1.12	+1.12
Socialist Alliance	Michael Myles	358	0.45	+0.45
Total formal votes		78,877	93.00	−1.83
Informal votes		5,936	7.00	+1.83
Turnout		84,813	93.67	−0.67
Two-party-preferred result
Labor	Bernie Ripoll	47,103	59.72	+1.76
Liberal	Daniel Smith	31,774	40.28	−1.76
Labor hold		Swing	+1.76	

=== Petrie ===
2004 Australian federal election: Petrie
Party	Candidate	Votes	%	±%
Liberal	Teresa Gambaro	41,987	52.73	+4.47
Labor	Gavin Brady	29,589	37.16	−0.80
Greens	Rick Pass	3,676	4.62	+1.93
Family First	Wade Whincop	2,972	3.73	+3.73
Democrats	Terri Ball	1,403	1.76	−3.44
Total formal votes		79,627	95.98	+0.26
Informal votes		3,338	4.02	−0.26
Turnout		82,965	94.69	−0.43
Two-party-preferred result
Liberal	Teresa Gambaro	46,119	57.92	+4.44
Labor	Gavin Brady	33,508	42.08	−4.44
Liberal hold		Swing	+4.44	

=== Rankin ===
2004 Australian federal election: Rankin
Party	Candidate	Votes	%	±%
Labor	Craig Emerson	34,471	43.92	−1.04
Liberal	Wendy Creighton	28,819	36.72	−4.05
Independent	Darren Power	5,134	6.54	+6.54
Family First	Ross Wilson	4,036	5.14	+5.14
Greens	Julian Hinton	2,422	3.09	+0.34
One Nation	Margaret Hands	1,601	2.04	−4.57
National	Mike Boyd	1,187	1.51	+1.51
Democrats	Catherine Sporle	653	0.83	−3.97
Citizens Electoral Council	Robert Meyers	158	0.20	+0.20
Total formal votes		78,481	92.81	−0.82
Informal votes		6,078	7.19	+0.82
Turnout		84,559	92.89	−1.06
Two-party-preferred result
Labor	Craig Emerson	41,774	53.23	+0.81
Liberal	Wendy Creighton	36,707	46.77	−0.81
Labor hold		Swing	+0.81	

=== Ryan ===
2004 Australian federal election: Ryan
Party	Candidate	Votes	%	±%
Liberal	Michael Johnson	43,499	54.76	+6.27
Labor	Victoria Chatterjee	23,365	29.41	−0.31
Greens	Paul Swan	7,753	9.76	+4.38
Family First	Percy Campbell	2,670	3.36	+3.36
Democrats	Simon Ingram	1,926	2.42	−3.86
Citizens Electoral Council	Neville Solomon	222	0.28	+0.28
Total formal votes		79,435	96.20	−1.06
Informal votes		3,134	3.80	+1.06
Turnout		82,569	94.31	−2.17
Two-party-preferred result
Liberal	Michael Johnson	47,997	60.42	+0.86
Labor	Victoria Chatterjee	31,438	39.58	−0.86
Liberal hold		Swing	+0.86	

=== Wide Bay ===
2004 Australian federal election: Wide Bay
Party	Candidate	Votes	%	±%
National	Warren Truss	38,544	47.08	+13.51
Labor	Sean Ambrose	21,031	25.69	−0.97
Independent	Lars Hedberg	9,980	12.19	+12.19
One Nation	Wesley Robinson	4,048	4.94	−6.21
Greens	Ian Richards	3,624	4.43	+2.32
Family First	Glen Wilson	2,899	3.54	+3.54
Democrats	Darryl Weir	935	1.14	−1.04
Independent	Cy D'Oliviera	816	1.00	+1.00
Total formal votes		81,877	95.22	+0.44
Informal votes		4,112	4.78	−0.44
Turnout		85,989	94.63	−0.16
Two-party-preferred result
National	Warren Truss	51,489	62.89	+2.99
Labor	Sean Ambrose	30,388	37.11	−2.99
National hold		Swing	+2.99	

== See also ==
- Members of the Australian House of Representatives, 2004–2007
