= Pre-election pendulum for the 2010 Australian federal election =

The following pendulum is known as the Mackerras pendulum, invented by psephologist Malcolm Mackerras. Based upon the outcome of the 2007 federal election and changes before the 2010 election, the pendulum works by lining up all of the seats held in Parliament, 83 Labor, 55 Liberal, 9 National, and 3 independent, according to the percentage point margin on a two party preferred basis.

The margins are post-redistribution, leaving some Liberal Party MPs in seats that have a notional majority of Labor Party voters, totalling 88 Labor, 59 coalition, 3 independent. In such cases, the seat is aligned with Labor and the MP's name is highlighted in blue.

The two-party result is also known as the swing required for the seat to change hands. Given a uniform swing to the opposition or government parties in an election, the number of seats that change hands can be predicted. Swing is never uniform, but in practice variations of swing among the Australian states usually tend to cancel each other out. Seats are arranged in categories of safeness following to the Australian Electoral Commission's classification of safeness. "Safe" seats require a swing of over 10 per cent to change, "fairly safe" seats require a swing of between 6 and 10 per cent, while "marginal" seats require a swing of less than 6 per cent.

Queensland Liberal and National MPs contested the 2010 federal election as members of the Queensland Liberal National Party. They retained their original party affiliation until after the election.

Government seats
Australian Labor Party
Marginal
Herbert (Qld)	Peter Lindsay (Note: This seat was held by a Liberal Party MP, but had a notional majority of Labor Party voters.)	ALP	50.03
Robertson (NSW)	Belinda Neal	ALP	50.09
Solomon (NT)	Damian Hale	ALP	50.19
Swan (WA)	Steve Irons	ALP	50.27
Macquarie (NSW)	Bob Debus	ALP	50.28
Macarthur (NSW)	Pat Farmer	ALP	50.51
Gilmore (NSW)	Joanna Gash	ALP	50.41
Dickson (Qld)	Peter Dutton	ALP	50.76
Corangamite (Vic)	Darren Cheeseman	ALP	50.85
Hasluck (WA)	Sharryn Jackson	ALP	50.85
Bass (Tas)	Jodie Campbell	ALP	51.03
Bennelong (NSW)	Maxine McKew	ALP	51.40
Deakin (Vic)	Mike Symon	ALP	51.41
Longman (Qld)	Jon Sullivan	ALP	51.87
Flynn (Qld)	Chris Trevor	ALP	52.24
Eden-Monaro (NSW)	Mike Kelly	ALP	52.29
Braddon (Tas)	Sid Sidebottom	ALP	52.32
Page (NSW)	Janelle Saffin	ALP	52.36
Dawson (Qld)	James Bidgood	ALP	52.59
Forde (Qld)	Brett Raguse	ALP	53.36
Dobell (NSW)	Craig Thomson	ALP	53.93
Franklin (Tas)	Julie Collins	ALP	54.03
Leichhardt (Qld)	Jim Turnour	ALP	54.06
Petrie (Qld)	Yvette D'Ath	ALP	54.21
Brisbane (Qld)	Arch Bevis	ALP	54.60
Kingston (SA)	Amanda Rishworth	ALP	54.42
Bonner (Qld)	Kerry Rea	ALP	54.53
Melbourne (Vic)	Lindsay Tanner	ALP	54.71 v GRN
Hindmarsh (SA)	Steve Georganas	ALP	55.05
Greenway (NSW)	Louise Markus	ALP	55.67
Brand (WA)	Gary Gray	ALP	55.98
Fairly safe
Moreton (Qld)	Graham Perrett	ALP	56.01
Bendigo (Vic)	Steve Gibbons	ALP	56.13
Lindsay (NSW)	David Bradbury	ALP	56.28
Wakefield (SA)	Nick Champion	ALP	56.59
Blair (Qld)	Shayne Neumann	ALP	56.98
Melbourne Ports (Vic)	Michael Danby	ALP	57.15
Chisholm (Vic)	Anna Burke	ALP	57.38
Isaacs (Vic)	Mark Dreyfus	ALP	57.69
Makin (SA)	Tony Zappia	ALP	57.70
Perth (WA)	Stephen Smith	ALP	57.94
Lilley (Qld)	Wayne Swan	ALP	57.95
Ballarat (Vic)	Catherine King	ALP	58.15
Bruce (Vic)	Alan Griffin	ALP	58.32
Lyons (Tas)	Dick Adams	ALP	58.34
Adelaide (SA)	Kate Ellis	ALP	58.53
Richmond (NSW)	Justine Elliot	ALP	58.87
Corio (Vic)	Richard Marles	ALP	58.93
Jagajaga (Vic)	Jenny Macklin	ALP	58.98
Fremantle (WA)	Melissa Parke	ALP	59.14
Parramatta (NSW)	Julie Owens	ALP	59.86
Safe
Banks (NSW)	Daryl Melham	ALP	60.37
Reid (NSW)	Laurie Ferguson	ALP	60.84
Lingiari (NT)	Warren Snowdon	ALP	61.16
Oxley (Qld)	Bernie Ripoll	ALP	61.34
Holt (Vic)	Anthony Byrne	ALP	61.63
Rankin (Qld)	Craig Emerson	ALP	61.67
Canberra (ACT)	Annette Ellis	ALP	61.82
Capricornia (Qld)	Kirsten Livermore	ALP	62.08
Griffith (Qld)	Kevin Rudd	ALP	62.32
Charlton (NSW)	Greg Combet	ALP	62.91
Hotham (Vic)	Simon Crean	ALP	63.00
Kingsford Smith (NSW)	Peter Garrett	ALP	63.26
McMahon (NSW)	Chris Bowen	ALP	63.77
Shortland (NSW)	Jill Hall	ALP	64.74
Barton (NSW)	Robert McClelland	ALP	64.94
Fraser (ACT)	Bob McMullan	ALP	65.07
Werriwa (NSW)	Chris Hayes	ALP	65.07
Denison (Tas)	Duncan Kerr	ALP	65.29
Maribyrnong (Vic)	Bill Shorten	ALP	65.32
Lalor (Vic)	Julia Gillard	ALP	65.53
Hunter (NSW)	Joel Fitzgibbon	ALP	65.68
Newcastle (NSW)	Sharon Grierson	ALP	65.91
Blaxland (NSW)	Jason Clare	ALP	66.65
Throsby (NSW)	Jennie George	ALP	66.76
Cunningham (NSW)	Sharon Bird	ALP	66.87
Watson (NSW)	Tony Burke	ALP	68.20
Sydney (NSW)	Tanya Plibersek	ALP	69.32
Calwell (Vic)	Maria Vamvakinou	ALP	69.33
Chifley (NSW)	Roger Price	ALP	69.68
Port Adelaide (SA)	Mark Butler	ALP	69.75
Very safe
Scullin (Vic)	Harry Jenkins	ALP	70.85
Gorton (Vic)	Brendan O'Connor	ALP	71.22
Gellibrand (Vic)	Nicola Roxon	ALP	71.46
Wills (Vic)	Kelvin Thomson	ALP	72.41
Fowler (NSW)	Julia Irwin	ALP	72.57
Grayndler (NSW)	Anthony Albanese	ALP	74.85
Batman (Vic)	Martin Ferguson	ALP	75.95

Non-government seats
Liberal/National coalition (Liberal National Party in QLD)
Marginal
Bowman (Qld)	Andrew Laming	LNP (Note: This Queensland seat was contested by a Liberal National Party candidate in the 2010 federal election. Queensland Liberal and National MPs retained their original party affiliation until after the election.)	50.00
McEwen (Vic)	Fran Bailey	LIB	50.02
Paterson (NSW)	Bob Baldwin	LIB	50.58
La Trobe (Vic)	Jason Wood	LIB	50.51
Hughes (NSW)	Danna Vale	LIB	50.54
Sturt (SA)	Christopher Pyne	LIB	50.94
Ryan (Qld)	Michael Johnson (Note: On 20 May 2010, Michael Johnson, who originally contested the seat as a Liberal Party member, was expelled from the Queensland Liberal National Party, and vowed to contest the Division of Ryan as an independent.)	LNP	51.21
Cowper (NSW)	Luke Hartsuyker	NAT	51.24
Stirling (WA)	Michael Keenan	LIB	51.27
Cowan (WA)	Luke Simpkins	LIB	51.28
Hinkler (Qld)	Paul Neville	LNP	51.52
Boothby (SA)	Andrew Southcott	LIB	52.93
Fairfax (Qld)	Alex Somlyay	LNP	52.97
Calare (NSW)	John Cobb	NAT	53.46
Fisher (Qld)	Peter Slipper	LNP	53.53
Wentworth (NSW)	Malcolm Turnbull	LIB	53.85
Dunkley (Vic)	Bruce Billson	LIB	54.04
Grey (SA)	Rowan Ramsey	LIB	54.43
Canning (WA)	Don Randall	LIB	54.35
McMillan (Vic)	Russell Broadbent	LIB	54.79
Wright (Qld)	Vacant (Note: The division of Wright was created under the Australian Electoral Commission's 2009 Redistribution of Queensland.)	LNP	53.79
Aston (Vic)	Chris Pearce	LIB	55.05
Hume (NSW)	Alby Schultz	LIB	55.35
Forrest (WA)	Nola Marino	LIB	55.48
North Sydney (NSW)	Joe Hockey	LIB	55.51
Gippsland (Vic)	Darren Chester	NAT	55.91
Casey (Vic)	Tony Smith	LIB	55.93
Fairly safe
Menzies (Vic)	Kevin Andrews	LIB	56.02
Goldstein (Vic)	Andrew Robb	LIB	56.05
Cook (NSW)	Scott Morrison	LIB	56.34
Higgins (Vic)	Kelly O'Dwyer	LIB	57.04
Mayo (SA)	Jamie Briggs	LIB	57.06
Wannon (Vic)	David Hawker	LIB	57.47
Durack (WA)	Barry Haase	LIB	57.65
Pearce (WA)	Judi Moylan	LIB	57.69
Groom (Qld)	Ian Macfarlane	LNP	58.22
Flinders (Vic)	Greg Hunt	LIB	58.25
Wide Bay (Qld)	Warren Truss	LNP	58.39
McPherson (Qld)	Margaret May	LNP	58.65
Warringah (NSW)	Tony Abbott	LIB	58.78
Moore (WA)	Mal Washer	LIB	58.93
Indi (Vic)	Sophie Mirabella	LIB	59.19
Barker (SA)	Patrick Secker	LIB	59.45
Kooyong (Vic)	Petro Georgiou	LIB	59.53
Mitchell (NSW)	Alex Hawke	LIB	59.65
Tangney (WA)	Dennis Jensen	LIB	59.81
Safe
Berowra (NSW)	Philip Ruddock	LIB	60.01
Fadden (Qld)	Stuart Robert	LNP	60.43
Farrer (NSW)	Sussan Ley	LIB	61.19
Mackellar (NSW)	Bronwyn Bishop	LIB	62.38
O'Connor (WA)	Wilson Tuckey	LIB	62.76
Curtin (WA)	Julie Bishop	LIB	63.26
Parkes (NSW)	Mark Coulton	NAT	63.67
Moncrieff (Qld)	Steven Ciobo	LNP	63.80
Bradfield (NSW)	Paul Fletcher	LIB	63.86
Maranoa (Qld)	Bruce Scott	LNP	64.06
Riverina (NSW)	Kay Hull	NAT	64.55
Murray (Vic)	Sharman Stone	LIB	68.26
Very safe
Mallee (Vic)	John Forrest	NAT	71.27
Independents
Kennedy (Qld)	Bob Katter	IND	66.29 v ALP
Lyne (NSW)	Rob Oakeshott	IND	73.87 v NP
New England (NSW)	Tony Windsor	IND	74.33 v NP
