= Origin Net =

Australian Internet service provider

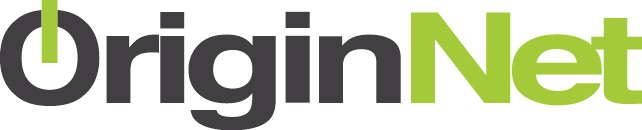
- Company type: Private
- Industry: Telecommunications
- Founded: Sydney, Australia (2011)
- Headquarters: Level 26, 44 Market Street, Sydney, Australia
- Area served: Australia, Europe
- Key people: Hon. Peter Lindsay
- Services: Fibre; Midband Ethernet; Fixed Wireless; ADSL/ADSL2+; SHDSL; Ethernet First Mile; 4G LTE; IP Transit; Dark Fibre; Corporate & Business Web Hosting; VPN; VoIP
- Number of employees: 20–50
- Website: www.originnet.com

Origin Net is an ISP and telecommunications carrier operating across Europe and Australia. Origin Net provides ADSL/NBN, Fibre Ethernet, Midband Ethernet, Fixed Wireless, EFM and IP transit connectivity packages. Origin Net also provides hosting services, VoIP connections, managed IT services and other internet services. Origin Net's headquarters are in Sydney CBD, with infrastructure operating out of multiple data centres across the world.

Origin Net owns and operates its own fixed wireless networks in Melbourne, Sydney, Brisbane, Greece, Monaco, Cairns, Townsville, Mount Isa, Toowoomba, Sunshine Coast, Forbes, Parkes and Orange.

In December 2023 Origin Net commenced proceedings against Origin Energy in the Federal Court of Australia for Trademark Infringement.
