= Teresa Gambaro =

Australian politician

The Honourable Teresa Gambaro
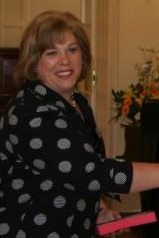
- Gambaro in 2007

Member of the Australian Parliament for Brisbane
- In office 21 August 2010 – 9 May 2016
- Preceded by: Arch Bevis
- Succeeded by: Trevor Evans

Member of the Australian Parliament for Petrie
- In office 2 March 1996 – 24 November 2007
- Preceded by: Gary Johns
- Succeeded by: Yvette D'Ath

Personal details
- Born: 29 November 1958 (age 67) Brisbane, Queensland, Australia
- Party: Liberal Party (Federal); Liberal National Party of Queensland (State)
- Spouse: Robert Duffy
- Education: Queensland University of Technology (BBus)
- Occupation: Small business owner
- Website: teresagambaro.com/

Teresa Gambaro (Italian: [teˈreːza ˈɡambaro]; born 29 November 1958) is an Australian former politician. She served as a member of the House of Representatives from 1996 to 2007 and 2010 to 2016, representing the Liberal Party. She was a parliamentary secretary in the Howard government from 2004 to 2007.

== Early life ==
Gambaro was born in Brisbane, Queensland. The daughter of an Italian immigrant, she was educated at Holy Spirit School in New Farm, the All Hallows' School in Brisbane, and later at the Queensland University of Technology. She was a sales manager, account manager, marketing manager, marketing consultant and tutor in marketing at the Queensland University of Technology before entering politics.

== Parliament ==
Gambaro was first elected to parliament as a Liberal at the 1996 federal election, in the division of Petrie.

She was appointed Parliamentary Secretary to the Minister for Defence in July 2004, and Parliamentary Secretary to the Minister for Foreign Affairs and Trade in January 2006. In 2007 she was appointed Assistant Minister for Immigration and Citizenship.

Gambaro lost her seat to Yvette D'Ath of the Labor Party at the 2007 federal election.

She re-entered Federal Parliament as the member for Brisbane at the 2010 federal election, becoming the first woman to represent Brisbane since its creation in 1901. Gambaro ran under the banner of the Liberal National Party, formed in 2008 after the merger of the Queensland divisions of the Liberal and National parties. She sat with the Liberals.

In September 2010 she was appointed Shadow Parliamentary Secretary for International Development Assistance and Shadow Parliamentary Secretary for Citizenship and Settlement by Opposition leader, Tony Abbott.

Gambaro retained her seat of Brisbane following the 2013 Australian federal election, increasing her majority to 4.5%. On 9 March 2016, she announced her retirement, stating that she would not contest Brisbane at the 2016 federal election.

== Political positions ==
Gambaro made news in January 2012 by suggesting that immigrants are not integrating into Australian culture well enough. She stated she believes that telling them to "wear deodorant" and learning to "wait in a queue" is "teaching what are norms in Australia". After a storm of outcry on social media and in Australian newspapers, she apologised.

In August 2013 Gambaro announced her support for same-sex marriage, despite party policy being against it, and said she had pressed Abbott for a conscience vote on the issue.

Parliament of Australia
Preceded by Gary Johns	Member for Petrie; 1996–2007	Succeeded by Yvette D'Ath
Preceded by Arch Bevis	Member for Brisbane; 2010–2016	Succeeded by Trevor Evans
