= Bernie Ripoll =

Australian politician (born 1966)

The Honourable Bernie Ripoll
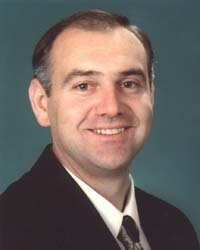

Member of the Australian Parliament for Oxley
- In office 3 October 1998 – 9 May 2016
- Preceded by: Pauline Hanson
- Succeeded by: Milton Dick

Personal details
- Born: 6 January 1966 (age 60) Pézenas, France
- Party: Australian Labor Party
- Children: 1 son; 2 daughters
- Education: Queensland University of Technology
- Occupation: Electrician, union organiser
- Website: Bernie Ripoll website

Bernard Fernand Ripoll (born 6 January 1966) is a former Australian politician. He was a Labor member of the Australian House of Representatives from 1998 to 2016, representing the Division of Oxley, Queensland. In 2013, Ripoll was made Shadow Minister for Financial Services and Shadow Minister for Sport, on 15 September 2015 he resigned from the Shadow Cabinet position.

== Early life ==
Ripoll was born on 6 January 1966 in Pézenas, France, the son of Suzanne (née Servera) and Andre Ripoll. His parents were Pieds-Noirs (European Algerians) of Spanish ancestry who came to France following the Algerian Revolution.

Ripoll moved to Australia as a child, where he learned to speak English, and became an Australian citizen in 1974. He grew up in Inala, Queensland. Ripoll joined the Royal Australian Air Force (RAAF) as a teenager and was an apprentice aircraft electrician from 1983 to 1984. He completed his high school leaving certificate by attending night school. He subsequently worked as an electrician from 1986 to 1990, later completing the degree of Bachelor of Business at the Queensland University of Technology as a marketing major.

Before entering parliament, Ripoll worked as an organiser with the State Public Services Federation of Queensland (now known as the Queensland Public Sector Union) from 1995 to 1998.

== Political career ==
At the 1998 federal election, Ripoll sought to regain Oxley for Labor. The seat had been held by Pauline Hanson, who formed One Nation after winning the normally safe Labor seat of Oxley in 1996 as an independent. Prior to the election, Oxley was divided in half, with most of the old Oxley's more rural territory shifted to the new Division of Blair. Hanson opted to contest Blair, which contained most of her former base. Former Queensland Premier Wayne Goss had already been preselected as Labor candidate, but a brain tumour forced him to retire from politics, and Ripoll was named in his place.

Ripoll was appointed Shadow Parliamentary Secretary for Infrastructure in October 2004.

On 2 March 2012, Ripoll was appointed Parliamentary Secretary to the Treasurer, and appointed as Parliamentary Secretary for Small Business from 25 March 2013.

In April 2015 Ripoll announced that he would not contest the next election, clearing the way for Milton Dick to pursue Labor party preselection. Dick was elected at the 2016 federal election.

== Subsequent activities ==
As of 2021 Ripoll was a director of lobbying firm SAS Group, along with former Nationals MP Larry Anthony.

Parliament of Australia
Preceded by Pauline Hanson	Member for Oxley; 1998–2016	Succeeded by Milton Dick
