= Peter Lindsay =

Australian politician

The Honourable Peter Lindsay OAM

Member of the Australian Parliament for Herbert
- In office 2 March 1996 – 19 July 2010
- Preceded by: Ted Lindsay
- Succeeded by: Ewen Jones

Parliamentary Secretary to the Minister for Defence
- In office 30 January 2007 – 3 December 2007
- Prime Minister: John Howard
- Preceded by: Sandy Macdonald
- Succeeded by: Mike Kelly

Personal details
- Born: 4 May 1944 (age 82) Brisbane, Queensland, Australia
- Party: Liberal Party of Australia
- Website: peterlindsay.com.au

Peter John Lindsay OAM (born 4 May 1944) is an Australian former politician who served as a Liberal Party of Australia member of the Australian House of Representatives from March 1996 to July 2010, representing the Division of Herbert, Queensland. In January 2007 he was appointed to the position of Parliamentary Secretary to the Minister of Defence in the Howard government. He was born in Brisbane, Queensland, and was a television station production manager and General Manager of Townsville Television from 1972 to 1996 before entering politics. He was a member of the City of Townsville City Council from 1985 to 1996.

In January 2010, Lindsay announced he would not contest the 2010 federal election. In 2011, Lindsay was appointed to the board of Origin Net and as the Chairman of Global Voices. In 2012, Lindsay was appointed as the Chairman of Guildford Coal. In 2014, Lindsay accepted the appointment of Deputy Chancellor James Cook University. Later in 2014, Lindsay was appointed to the boards of the Defence Honours & Awards Appeal Tribunal, the Queensland Government's Gambling Community Benefit Committee and the Constitution Education Fund Australia. In 2016, Peter was awarded the medal of the Order of Australia.

Parliament of Australia
Preceded by Ted Lindsay	Member for Herbert; 1996–2010	Succeeded by Ewen Jones
