= Arch Bevis =

Australian Labor Party politician

The Honourable Arch Bevis
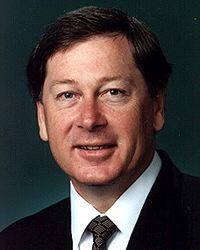

Member of the Australian Parliament for Brisbane
- In office 24 March 1990 – 21 August 2010
- Preceded by: Manfred Cross
- Succeeded by: Teresa Gambaro

Personal details
- Born: 10 April 1955 (age 70) Brisbane, Queensland, Australia
- Party: Australian Labor Party

Archibald Ronald Bevis (born 10 April 1955) is an Australian Labor Party politician who represented the Division of Brisbane from 1990 to 2010. Bevis held a variety of ministerial, shadow ministerial, and parliamentary leadership positions.

== Early life and education ==
Bevis was born in Brisbane and educated at Ithaca Creek State School and The Gap State High School. He graduated from the then-Brisbane College of Advanced Education, now QUT. Whilst studying to become a teacher, Bevis was president of the Australian Student Teachers Federation.

== Early career ==
Bevis worked as a teacher between 1975 and 1977. He became the Queensland President of Young Labor in 1975, aged 20, and went on to become National President of Young Labor in 1978, aged 23.

Between 1978 and 1980, Bevis worked as an organiser for the Queensland Teachers Union. In 1980, he was promoted to Deputy General Secretary, a position he held until 1990.

From 1988 to 1990, he was also a member of the Labor Party's national executive. He was elected vice-president of the Australian Labor Party from 2000 to 2002.

== Parliamentary career ==
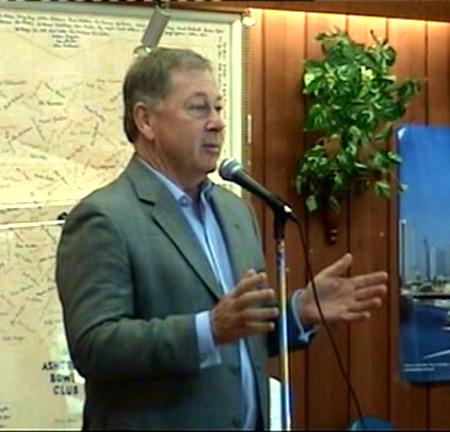
Bevis in June 2007

After being elected to the House of Representatives at the 1990 election, Bevis served on a number of committees. He chaired the Standing Committee on Industry, Science and Technology from 1993 to 1994 and the Joint Standing Committee on Electoral Matters from 1992 to 1993.

After Labor lost the 1996 election, Bevis was one of only two Queensland Labor members left in Federal Parliament and held the northernmost Labor seat in federal parliament.

He was defeated in the 2010 election by Liberal National challenger Teresa Gambaro, then-formerly the member for Petrie, by 1,831 votes.

=== Ministry ===
Bevis served as the Parliamentary Secretary to the Minister for Defence from 25 March 1994 to 11 March 1996.

=== Shadow Ministry ===
Following the 1996 election, which Labor lost, Bevis was promoted to the Shadow Cabinet, where he served until Labor won a majority in the 2007 election.

=== Committee leadership ===
In 2007, Bevis was elected chairperson of the Parliamentary Joint Committee on Intelligence and Security and chairperson of the Joint Defence Sub-Committee of the Joint Standing Committee on Foreign Affairs, Defence and Trade.

== Awards ==
Bevis has been awarded life membership of the Australian Education Union (AEU), the Queensland Branch of the Australian Labor Party (ALP), and the Queensland Teachers Union (QTU). Bevis also received a Medal of the Order of Australia (OAM).

Parliament of Australia
Preceded by Manfred Cross	Member of Brisbane; 1990–2010	Succeeded by Teresa Gambaro
