= Electoral results for the Division of Herbert =

Australian division election results

This is a list of electoral results for the Division of Herbert in Australian federal elections from the division's creation in 1901 until the present.

== Members ==
Member	Party	Term
Fred Bamford	Labour	1901–1916
Fred Bamford	National Labor	1916–1917
Fred Bamford	Nationalist	1917–1925
Lewis Nott	Nationalist	1925–1928
George Martens	Labor	1928–1946
Bill Edmonds	Labor	1946–1958
John Murray	Liberal	1958–1961
Ted Harding	Labor	1961–1966
Robert Bonnett	Liberal	1966–1977
Gordon Dean	Liberal	1977–1983
Ted Lindsay	Labor	1983–1996
Peter Lindsay	Liberal	1996–2010
Ewen Jones	Liberal National	2010–2016
Cathy O'Toole	Labor	2016–2019
Phillip Thompson	Liberal National	2019–present

== Election results ==
=== Elections in the 2020s ===
==== 2025 ====
2025 Australian federal election: Herbert
Party	Candidate	Votes	%	±%
Liberal National	Phillip Thompson	47,941	48.74	+1.73
Labor	Edwina Andrew	22,646	23.02	+1.42
Greens	Chris Evans	9,228	9.38	+1.16
Katter's Australian	Darryn Casson	6,559	6.67	−0.33
One Nation	Ross Macdonald	5,100	5.18	−0.09
People First	Felicity Cole	3,255	3.31	+3.31
Trumpet of Patriots	Martin Brewster	2,173	2.21	+2.21
Family First	Felicity Roser	1,460	1.48	+1.48
Total formal votes		98,362	94.89	+0.66
Informal votes		5,300	5.11	−0.66
Turnout		103,662	85.47	−0.46
Two-party-preferred result
Liberal National	Phillip Thompson	62,374	63.41	+1.64
Labor	Edwina Andrew	35,988	36.59	−1.64
Liberal National hold		Swing	+1.64	

==== 2022 ====
2022 Australian federal election: Herbert
Party	Candidate	Votes	%	±%
Liberal National	Phillip Thompson	43,453	47.01	+9.90
Labor	John Ring	19,971	21.60	−3.85
Greens	Scott Humphreys	7,596	8.22	+0.91
Katter's Australian	Clynton Hawks	6,472	7.00	−2.80
One Nation	Diane Pepe	4,874	5.27	−5.82
Independent	Angela Egan	2,983	3.23	+3.23
United Australia	Greg Dowling	2,383	2.58	−3.12
Informed Medical Options	Toni McMahon	1,658	1.79	+1.79
Animal Justice	Toni McCormack	1,359	1.47	−0.25
Independent	Steven Clare	942	1.02	+1.02
Great Australian	Larna Ballard	749	0.81	+0.81
Total formal votes		92,440	94.23	+0.13
Informal votes		5,658	5.77	−0.13
Turnout		98,098	85.93	−4.13
Two-party-preferred result
Liberal National	Phillip Thompson	57,103	61.77	+3.41
Labor	John Ring	35,337	38.23	−3.41
Liberal National hold		Swing	+3.41	

Alluvial diagram for preference flows in the seat of Herbert in the 2022 federal election. indicates at what stage the winning candidate had over 50% of the votes and was declared the winner.

=== Elections in the 2010s ===
==== 2019 ====
2019 Australian federal election: Herbert
Party	Candidate	Votes	%	±%
Liberal National	Phillip Thompson	34,112	37.11	+1.61
Labor	Cathy O'Toole	23,393	25.45	−5.00
One Nation	Amy Lohse	10,189	11.09	−2.44
Katter's Australian	Nanette Radeck	9,007	9.80	+2.93
Greens	Sam Blackadder	6,721	7.31	+1.05
United Australia	Greg Dowling	5,239	5.70	+5.34
Conservative National	Tamara Durant	1,671	1.82	+1.82
Animal Justice	Mackenzie Severns	1,585	1.72	+1.72
Total formal votes		91,917	94.10	+0.98
Informal votes		5,759	5.90	−0.98
Turnout		97,676	90.06	−0.83
Two-party-preferred result
Liberal National	Phillip Thompson	53,641	58.36	+8.38
Labor	Cathy O'Toole	38,276	41.64	−8.38
Liberal National gain from Labor		Swing	+8.38	

==== 2016 ====
2016 Australian federal election: Herbert
Party	Candidate	Votes	%	±%
Liberal National	Ewen Jones	31,361	35.50	−7.84
Labor	Cathy O'Toole	26,900	30.45	+1.07
One Nation	Geoff Virgo	11,950	13.53	+12.70
Katter's Australian	Colin Dwyer	6,070	6.87	−1.21
Greens	Wendy Tubman	5,533	6.26	+1.02
Family First	Michael Punshon	3,175	3.59	+2.29
Glenn Lazarus Team	Aaron Raffin	1,937	2.19	+2.19
Liberal Democrats	David Harris	1,096	1.24	+1.24
Palmer United	Martin Brewster	315	0.36	−8.52
Total formal votes		88,337	93.12	−0.95
Informal votes		6,525	6.88	+0.95
Turnout		94,862	90.50	−2.86
Two-party-preferred result
Labor	Cathy O'Toole	44,187	50.02	+6.19
Liberal National	Ewen Jones	44,150	49.98	−6.19
Labor gain from Liberal National		Swing	+6.19	

==== 2013 ====
2013 Australian federal election: Herbert
Party	Candidate	Votes	%	±%
Liberal National	Ewen Jones	36,952	43.34	−2.33
Labor	Cathy O'Toole	25,051	29.38	−10.77
Palmer United	Martin Brewster	7,573	8.88	+8.88
Katter's Australian	Bronwyn Walker	6,890	8.08	+8.08
Greens	Gail Hamilton	4,463	5.24	−3.61
Sex Party	Costa George	1,576	1.85	+1.85
Family First	Michael Punshon	1,106	1.30	−4.03
One Nation	Steve Moir	710	0.83	+0.83
Rise Up Australia	Nino Marolla	549	0.64	+0.64
Australian Voice	Margaret Bell	383	0.45	+0.45
Total formal votes		85,253	94.07	+0.33
Informal votes		5,379	5.93	−0.33
Turnout		90,632	93.21	+0.62
Two-party-preferred result
Liberal National	Ewen Jones	47,889	56.17	+4.00
Labor	Cathy O'Toole	37,364	43.83	−4.00
Liberal National hold		Swing	+4.00	

==== 2010 ====
2010 Australian federal election: Herbert
Party	Candidate	Votes	%	±%
Liberal National	Ewen Jones	36,086	45.67	+2.14
Labor	Tony Mooney	31,729	40.15	−3.12
Greens	Mike Rubenach	6,995	8.85	+3.81
Family First	Michael Punshon	4,208	5.33	+3.67
Total formal votes		79,018	93.74	−2.04
Informal votes		5,281	6.26	+2.04
Turnout		84,299	92.59	−1.07
Two-party-preferred result
Liberal National	Ewen Jones	41,221	52.17	+2.20
Labor	Tony Mooney	37,797	47.83	−2.20
Liberal National notional gain from Labor		Swing	+2.20	

=== Elections in the 2000s ===
==== 2007 ====
2007 Australian federal election: Herbert
Party	Candidate	Votes	%	±%
Liberal	Peter Lindsay	37,397	45.70	−2.68
Labor	George Colbran	35,838	43.79	+7.81
Greens	Jenny Stirling	4,201	5.13	+0.17
Family First	Michael Punshon	1,283	1.57	−2.33
Independent	Bill Brennan	900	1.10	+1.10
One Nation	Francis Pauler	748	0.91	−2.43
Liberty & Democracy	Ben Thompson	505	0.62	+0.62
Independent	Garrie Lynch	487	0.60	+0.60
Democrats	Sharon Sheridan	476	0.58	−0.73
Total formal votes		81,835	95.81	+1.31
Informal votes		3,575	4.19	−1.31
Turnout		85,410	94.11	−0.77
Two-party-preferred result
Liberal	Peter Lindsay	41,089	50.21	−6.03
Labor	George Colbran	40,746	49.79	+6.03
Liberal hold		Swing	−6.03	

==== 2004 ====
2004 Australian federal election: Herbert
Party	Candidate	Votes	%	±%
Liberal	Peter Lindsay	38,792	49.74	+6.80
Labor	Anita Phillips	28,260	36.24	−0.31
Greens	Jenny Stirling	3,915	5.02	+2.30
Family First	Cathy Eaton	2,993	3.84	+3.84
One Nation	William Michael Brennan	2,675	3.43	−3.36
Democrats	Richard Hoolihan	1,025	1.31	−1.79
Citizens Electoral Council	Les Marsden	323	0.41	+0.41
Total formal votes		77,983	94.47	−0.66
Informal votes		4,563	5.53	+0.66
Turnout		82,546	93.82	−2.18
Two-party-preferred result
Liberal	Peter Lindsay	43,828	56.20	+4.67
Labor	Anita Phillips	34,155	43.80	−4.67
Liberal hold		Swing	+4.67	

==== 2001 ====
2001 Australian federal election: Herbert
Party	Candidate	Votes	%	±%
Liberal	Peter Lindsay	35,349	42.98	+3.07
Labor	Jenny Hill	29,897	36.35	−0.84
Independent	Conway Bown	6,473	7.87	+7.87
One Nation	Anthony Weil	5,827	7.08	−7.21
Democrats	Richard Hoolihan	2,494	3.03	+0.46
Greens	Anne Goddard	2,205	2.68	+0.41
Total formal votes		82,245	95.07	−1.07
Informal votes		4,266	4.93	+1.07
Turnout		86,511	96.31	
Two-party-preferred result
Liberal	Peter Lindsay	42,455	51.62	+1.52
Labor	Jenny Hill	39,790	48.38	−1.52
Liberal hold		Swing	+1.52	

=== Elections in the 1990s ===
==== 1998 ====
1998 Australian federal election: Herbert
Party	Candidate	Votes	%	±%
Liberal	Peter Lindsay	30,683	39.91	+1.28
Labor	Ted Lindsay	28,588	37.19	+0.64
One Nation	Mark Swain	10,991	14.30	+14.30
Democrats	Althea Smith	1,979	2.57	−3.37
Greens	Rebecca Smith	1,747	2.27	+2.27
Christian Democrats	John Edmiston	948	1.23	+1.23
Independent	Elaine Steley	816	1.06	+1.06
Women's Party	Pauline Woodbridge	619	0.81	−0.93
Independent	Bob Bradley	503	0.65	+0.65
Total formal votes		76,874	96.13	−1.30
Informal votes		3,091	3.87	+1.30
Turnout		79,965	94.68	−0.56
Two-party-preferred result
Liberal	Peter Lindsay	38,512	50.10	−6.52
Labor	Ted Lindsay	38,362	49.90	+6.52
Liberal hold		Swing	−6.52	

==== 1996 ====
1996 Australian federal election: Herbert
Party	Candidate	Votes	%	±%
Liberal	Peter Lindsay	29,405	38.75	+7.36
Labor	Ted Lindsay	27,812	36.65	−4.49
National	Ken Kipping	11,468	15.11	+8.92
Democrats	Colin Edwards	4,473	5.89	+2.16
Women's Party	Josephine Sailor	1,338	1.76	+1.76
Independent	David Smallwood	730	0.96	+0.96
Independent	Alex Caldwell	660	0.87	+0.87
Total formal votes		75,886	97.42	−0.06
Informal votes		2,010	2.58	+0.06
Turnout		77,896	94.12	−1.45
Two-party-preferred result
Liberal	Peter Lindsay	42,826	56.59	+9.90
Labor	Ted Lindsay	32,852	43.41	−9.90
Liberal gain from Labor		Swing	+9.90	

==== 1993 ====
1993 Australian federal election: Herbert
Party	Candidate	Votes	%	±%
Labor	Ted Lindsay	31,349	40.56	−5.33
Liberal	Peter Hazard	24,300	31.44	+6.63
Independent	John Robinson	10,002	12.94	+12.94
National	Robyn Quick	5,374	6.95	−11.08
Democrats	Col Parker	2,848	3.68	−7.59
Greens	Dave Kimble	1,771	2.29	+2.29
Confederate Action	Warren Harvey	640	0.83	+0.83
Independent	Bill Setter	515	0.67	+0.67
Indigenous Peoples	Cilla Pryor	495	0.64	+0.64
Total formal votes		77,294	97.50	−0.52
Informal votes		1,984	2.50	+0.52
Turnout		79,278	95.56	
Two-party-preferred result
Labor	Ted Lindsay	40,452	52.37	−2.63
Liberal	Peter Hazard	36,786	47.63	+2.63
Labor hold		Swing	−2.63	

==== 1990 ====
1990 Australian federal election: Herbert
Party	Candidate	Votes	%	±%
Labor	Ted Lindsay	32,166	45.8	−5.3
Liberal	Peter Hazard	17,384	24.8	+8.7
National	Rick Anderton	12,749	18.2	−9.5
Democrats	Colin Parker	7,885	11.2	+6.1
Total formal votes		70,184	98.0	
Informal votes		1,419	2.0	
Turnout		71,603	93.3	
Two-party-preferred result
Labor	Ted Lindsay	38,438	54.9	−1.9
Liberal	Peter Hazard	31,529	45.1	+45.1
Labor hold		Swing	−1.9	

=== Elections in the 1980s ===
==== 1987 ====
1987 Australian federal election: Herbert
Party	Candidate	Votes	%	±%
Labor	Ted Lindsay	33,507	51.1	+0.8
National	Jose Goicoechea	18,206	27.7	−3.9
Liberal	Rosemary Pavey	10,571	16.1	+1.9
Democrats	Paul Swanton	3,344	5.1	+1.2
Total formal votes		65,628	96.6	
Informal votes		2,338	3.4	
Turnout		67,966	90.3	
Two-party-preferred result
Labor	Ted Lindsay	37,259	56.8	+3.2
National	Jose Goicoechea	28,360	43.2	−3.2
Labor hold		Swing	+3.2	

==== 1984 ====
1984 Australian federal election: Herbert
Party	Candidate	Votes	%	±%
Labor	Ted Lindsay	29,589	50.3	−0.2
National	Vicky Kippin	18,602	31.6	+18.0
Liberal	Theo Theofanes	8,326	14.2	−19.4
Democrats	Ana Bristowe-Lamb	2,273	3.9	+1.6
Total formal votes		58,790	96.3	
Informal votes		2,286	3.7	
Turnout		61,076	90.6	
Two-party-preferred result
Labor	Ted Lindsay	31,517	53.6	+0.5
National	Vicky Kippin	27,270	46.4	+46.4
Labor hold		Swing	+0.5	

==== 1983 ====
1983 Australian federal election: Herbert
Party	Candidate	Votes	%	±%
Labor	Ted Lindsay	35,368	50.2	+3.7
Liberal	Gordon Dean	23,875	33.9	−13.9
National	John Aubrey	9,562	13.6	+13.6
Democrats	John Lamb	1,597	2.3	−3.3
Total formal votes		70,402	99.1	
Informal votes		659	0.9	
Turnout		71,061	90.7	
Two-party-preferred result
Labor	Ted Lindsay		52.8	+3.7
Liberal	Gordon Dean		47.2	−3.7
Labor gain from Liberal		Swing	+3.7	

==== 1980 ====
1980 Australian federal election: Herbert
Party	Candidate	Votes	%	±%
Liberal	Gordon Dean	31,538	47.9	+14.4
Labor	Ted Lindsay	30,575	46.5	+9.5
Democrats	John Lamb	3,690	5.6	−2.2
Total formal votes		65,803	98.5	
Informal votes		978	1.5	
Turnout		66,781	93.3	
Two-party-preferred result
Liberal	Gordon Dean	33,462	50.9	−6.8
Labor	Ted Lindsay	32,341	49.1	+6.8
Liberal hold		Swing	−6.8	

=== Elections in the 1970s ===
==== 1977 ====
1977 Australian federal election: Herbert
Party	Candidate	Votes	%	±%
Labor	Ted Lindsay	22,668	37.0	−5.5
Liberal	Gordon Dean	20,559	33.5	−24.0
National Country	Charles Arnold	12,357	20.2	+20.2
Democrats	Kenneth Kipping	4,799	7.8	+7.8
Independent	Grahame Wells	418	0.7	+0.7
Progress	Coral Finlay	250	0.4	+0.4
Independent	Peter Dunn	236	0.4	+0.4
Total formal votes		61,287	98.4	
Informal votes		1,014	1.6	
Turnout		62,301	94.5	
Two-party-preferred result
Liberal	Gordon Dean	35,353	57.7	+0.2
Labor	Ted Lindsay	25,934	42.3	−0.2
Liberal hold		Swing	+0.2	

==== 1975 ====
1975 Australian federal election: Herbert
Party	Candidate	Votes	%	±%
Liberal	Robert Bonnett	34,620	58.0	+4.9
Labor	John Rockett	25,096	42.0	−2.2
Total formal votes		59,716	98.4	
Informal votes		945	1.6	
Turnout		60,661	94.8	
Liberal hold		Swing	+3.8	

==== 1974 ====
1974 Australian federal election: Herbert
Party	Candidate	Votes	%	±%
Liberal	Robert Bonnett	30,908	53.1	+8.3
Labor	John Rockett	25,712	44.2	+0.9
Australia	Leonard Weber	1,601	2.7	+0.1
Total formal votes		58,221	98.7	
Informal votes		783	1.3	
Turnout		59,004	93.7	
Two-party-preferred result
Liberal	Robert Bonnett		54.2	+0.4
Labor	John Rockett		45.8	−0.4
Liberal hold		Swing	+0.4	

==== 1972 ====
1972 Australian federal election: Herbert
Party	Candidate	Votes	%	±%
Liberal	Robert Bonnett	22,601	44.8	+2.1
Labor	Fabian Sweeney	21,873	43.3	−2.8
Democratic Labor	Kiernan Dorney	4,719	9.3	−1.9
Australia	Leonard Weber	1,311	2.6	+2.6
Total formal votes		50,504	98.3	
Informal votes		897	1.7	
Turnout		51,401	94.2	
Two-party-preferred result
Liberal	Robert Bonnett	27,171	53.8	+2.1
Labor	Fabian Sweeney	23,333	46.2	−2.1
Liberal hold		Swing	+2.1	

=== Elections in the 1960s ===
==== 1969 ====
1969 Australian federal election: Herbert
Party	Candidate	Votes	%	±%
Labor	Ted Harding	21,318	46.1	−1.6
Liberal	Robert Bonnett	19,738	42.7	+6.9
Democratic Labor	Kiernan Dorney	5,181	11.2	−5.2
Total formal votes		46,237	98.7	
Informal votes		597	1.3	
Turnout		46,834	94.3	
Two-party-preferred result
Liberal	Robert Bonnett	23,897	51.7	+3.0
Labor	Ted Harding	22,340	48.3	−3.0
Liberal gain from Labor		Swing	+3.0	

==== 1966 ====
1966 Australian federal election: Herbert
Party	Candidate	Votes	%	±%
Labor	Ted Harding	22,212	45.3	−1.2
Liberal	Robert Bonnett	18,721	38.2	+5.5
Democratic Labor	Kiernan Dorney	8,053	16.4	−2.1
Total formal votes		48,986	98.1	
Informal votes		955	1.9	
Turnout		49,941	95.7	
Two-party-preferred result
Liberal	Robert Bonnett	25,041	51.1	+4.3
Labor	Ted Harding	23,945	48.9	−4.3
Liberal gain from Labor		Swing	+4.3	

==== 1963 ====
1963 Australian federal election: Herbert
Party	Candidate	Votes	%	±%
Labor	Ted Harding	21,062	46.5	−2.5
Liberal	Roy Pope	14,805	32.7	−10.4
Democratic Labor	Kiernan Dorney	8,410	18.5	+13.4
Communist	Frank Bishop	1,063	2.3	−0.5
Total formal votes		45,340	97.4	
Informal votes		1,229	2.6	
Turnout		46,569	95.8	
Two-party-preferred result
Labor	Ted Harding	24,132	53.2	+0.9
Liberal	Roy Pope	21,208	46.8	−0.9
Labor hold		Swing	+0.9	

==== 1961 ====
1961 Australian federal election: Herbert
Party	Candidate	Votes	%	±%
Labor	Ted Harding	20,839	49.0	+7.5
Liberal	John Murray	18,296	43.1	+0.5
Queensland Labor	Victor Bodero	2,181	5.1	−9.0
Communist	Frank Bishop	1,171	2.8	+1.0
Total formal votes		42,487	96.3	
Informal votes		1,634	3.7	
Turnout		44,121	94.3	
Two-party-preferred result
Labor	Ted Harding		52.3	+3.8
Liberal	John Murray		47.7	−3.8
Labor gain from Liberal		Swing	+3.8	

=== Elections in the 1950s ===
==== 1958 ====
1958 Australian federal election: Herbert
Party	Candidate	Votes	%	±%
Liberal	John Murray (Note: Murray was a vice-president of the Country Party and received the endorsement of both the Country Party and Liberal Party, which co-operated at the election via a joint Liberal-Country Party Co-ordination Organisation. After the election Murray elected to join the parliamentary Liberal Party.)	16,669	42.6	−0.2
Labor	Bill Edmonds	16,249	41.6	−9.2
Queensland Labor	Victor Bodero	5,496	14.1	+14.1
Communist	Hugh Fay	702	1.8	−4.7
Total formal votes		39,116	95.8	
Informal votes		1,727	4.2	
Turnout		40,843	94.5	
Two-party-preferred result
Liberal	John Murray	20,136	51.5	+8.1
Labor	Bill Edmonds	18,980	48.5	−8.1
Liberal gain from Labor		Swing	+8.1	

==== 1955 ====
1955 Australian federal election: Herbert
Party	Candidate	Votes	%	±%
Labor	Bill Edmonds	18,825	50.7	−5.1
Country	Arnold White	15,885	42.8	+2.1
Communist	Frank Bishop	2,416	6.5	+3.0
Total formal votes		37,126	97.3	
Informal votes		1,012	2.7	
Turnout		38,138	92.8	
Two-party-preferred result
Labor	Bill Edmonds		56.6	−2.3
Country	Arnold White		43.4	+2.3
Labor hold		Swing	−2.3	

==== 1954 ====
1954 Australian federal election: Herbert
Party	Candidate	Votes	%	±%
Labor	Bill Edmonds	20,894	55.8	+1.7
Country	Fred Purdie	15,239	40.7	−2.0
Communist	Claude Jones	1,323	3.5	+0.3
Total formal votes		37,456	98.2	
Informal votes		684	1.8	
Turnout		38,140	95.3	
Two-party-preferred result
Labor	Bill Edmonds		59.0	+2.0
Country	Fred Purdie		41.0	−2.0
Labor hold		Swing	+2.0	

==== 1951 ====
1951 Australian federal election: Herbert
Party	Candidate	Votes	%	±%
Labor	Bill Edmonds	19,445	54.1	+4.7
Country	Doug Jeffrey	15,332	42.7	−2.7
Communist	Gloria Phelan	1,160	3.2	−2.0
Total formal votes		35,937	97.3	
Informal votes		991	2.7	
Turnout		36,928	93.7	
Two-party-preferred result
Labor	Bill Edmonds		57.0	+3.3
Country	Doug Jeffrey		43.0	−3.3
Labor hold		Swing	+3.3	

=== Elections in the 1940s ===
==== 1949 ====
1949 Australian federal election: Herbert
Party	Candidate	Votes	%	±%
Labor	Bill Edmonds	17,395	49.4	+1.0
Country	Doug Jeffrey	15,973	45.4	+13.0
Communist	Jim Henderson	1,847	5.2	−10.6
Total formal votes		35,215	96.8	
Informal votes		1,160	3.2	
Turnout		36,375	93.1	
Two-party-preferred result
Labor	Bill Edmonds	18,898	53.7	−10.4
Country	Doug Jeffrey	16,317	46.3	+10.4
Labor hold		Swing	−10.4	

==== 1946 ====
1946 Australian federal election: Herbert
Party	Candidate	Votes	%	±%
Labor	Bill Edmonds	28,246	46.0	+8.4
Country	Lloyd Roberts	20,804	33.9	+11.2
Communist	Jack Henry	9,404	15.3	−18.9
Independent	Joseph Pollard	1,668	2.7	+2.7
Services	Alexander McNamee	1,236	2.0	+2.0
Total formal votes		61,358	95.3	
Informal votes		3,050	4.7	
Turnout		64,408	90.5	
Two-party-preferred result
Labor	Bill Edmonds	37,026	60.3	−1.4
Country	Lloyd Roberts	24,332	39.7	+39.7
Labor hold		Swing	−1.4	

==== 1943 ====
1943 Australian federal election: Herbert
Party	Candidate	Votes	%	±%
Labor	George Martens	22,697	37.6	−3.1
Communist	Fred Paterson	20,629	34.2	+34.2
Country	Archie Graham	13,693	22.7	−12.8
Independent	Charles Cook	3,300	5.5	+5.5
Total formal votes		60,319	97.3	
Informal votes		1,673	2.7	
Turnout		61,992	91.6	
Two-party-preferred result
Labor	George Martens	37,219	61.7	+5.3
Communist	Fred Paterson	23,100	38.3	+38.3
Labor hold		Swing	+5.3	

==== 1940 ====
1940 Australian federal election: Herbert
Party	Candidate	Votes	%	±%
Labor	George Martens	24,712	40.7	−2.9
Country	Thomas Mann	21,545	35.5	+6.3
Independent	Fred Paterson	11,104	18.3	+18.3
Independent RSL	Louis Haydon	3,346	5.5	+5.5
Total formal votes		60,707	96.3	
Informal votes		2,365	3.7	
Turnout		63,072	92.3	
Two-party-preferred result
Labor	George Martens	34,261	56.4	−10.0
Country	Thomas Mann	26,446	43.6	+10.0
Labor hold		Swing	−10.0	

=== Elections in the 1930s ===
==== 1937 ====
1937 Australian federal election: Herbert
Party	Candidate	Votes	%	±%
Labor	George Martens	25,766	43.6	−8.7
Country	James Wilkie	17,252	29.2	+29.2
Communist	Fred Paterson	12,523	21.2	+12.9
Social Credit	Henry Beck	3,622	6.1	+6.1
Total formal votes		59,163	95.1	
Informal votes		3,019	4.9	
Turnout		62,182	94.4	
Two-party-preferred result
Labor	George Martens	39,263	66.4	+5.4
Country	James Wilkie	19,900	33.6	+33.6
Labor hold		Swing	+5.4	

==== 1934 ====
1934 Australian federal election: Herbert
Party	Candidate	Votes	%	±%
Labor	George Martens	27,721	52.3	−3.7
United Australia	Ron Muir	20,005	37.7	−6.3
Communist	Jack Henry	4,404	8.3	+8.3
Lang Labor	Claude Vesperman	865	1.6	+1.6
Total formal votes		52,995	95.6	
Informal votes		2,429	4.4	
Turnout		55,424	94.0	
Two-party-preferred result
Labor	George Martens		61.0	+5.0
United Australia	Ron Muir		39.0	−5.0
Labor hold		Swing	+5.0	

==== 1931 ====
1931 Australian federal election: Herbert
Party	Candidate	Votes	%	±%
Labor	George Martens	31,866	56.3	+3.5
United Australia	Grosvenor Francis	24,733	43.7	−3.5
Total formal votes		56,599	95.8	
Informal votes		2,473	4.2	
Turnout		59,072	92.9	
Labor hold		Swing	+3.5	

=== Elections in the 1920s ===
==== 1929 ====
1929 Australian federal election: Herbert
Party	Candidate	Votes	%	±%
Labor	George Martens	28,813	52.8	+2.6
Nationalist	William Amiet	25,772	47.2	−2.6
Total formal votes		54,585	95.5	
Informal votes		2,593	4.5	
Turnout		57,178	93.2	
Labor hold		Swing	+2.6	

==== 1928 ====
1928 Australian federal election: Herbert
Party	Candidate	Votes	%	±%
Labor	George Martens	25,462	50.2	+0.5
Nationalist	Lewis Nott	25,308	49.8	−0.5
Total formal votes		50,770	93.9	
Informal votes		3,312	6.1	
Turnout		54,082	93.5	
Labor gain from Nationalist		Swing	+0.5	

==== 1925 ====
1925 Australian federal election: Herbert
Party	Candidate	Votes	%	±%
Nationalist	Lewis Nott	22,385	50.3	−1.4
Labor	Ted Theodore	22,117	49.7	+1.4
Total formal votes		44,502	95.3	
Informal votes		2,188	4.7	
Turnout		46,690	90.2	
Nationalist hold		Swing	−1.4	

==== 1922 ====
1922 Australian federal election: Herbert
Party	Candidate	Votes	%	±%
Nationalist	Fred Bamford	17,396	51.7	+0.9
Labor	Maurice Hynes	16,259	48.3	+1.8
Total formal votes		33,655	93.3	
Informal votes		2,435	6.7	
Turnout		36,090	83.4	
Nationalist hold		Swing	−0.5	

=== Elections in the 1910s ===
==== 1919 ====
1919 Australian federal election: Herbert
Party	Candidate	Votes	%	±%
Nationalist	Fred Bamford	17,470	51.0	−0.3
Labor	Eugene McKenna	15,872	46.3	−2.4
Independent	Henry Madden	493	1.4	+1.4
Independent	Terence Haren	443	1.3	+1.3
Total formal votes		34,278	90.5	
Informal votes		3,583	9.5	
Turnout		37,861	87.3	
Two-party-preferred result
Nationalist	Fred Bamford		52.4	+1.1
Labor	Eugene McKenna		47.6	−1.1
Nationalist hold		Swing	+1.1	

==== 1917 ====
1917 Australian federal election: Herbert
Party	Candidate	Votes	%	±%
Nationalist	Fred Bamford	18,583	51.3	+15.7
Labor	Eugene McKenna	17,634	48.7	−15.7
Total formal votes		36,217	97.5	
Informal votes		921	2.5	
Turnout		37,138	90.0	
Nationalist gain from Labor		Swing	+15.7	

==== 1914 ====
1914 Australian federal election: Herbert
Party	Candidate	Votes	%	±%
Labor	Fred Bamford	18,700	64.4	+6.4
Liberal	Frank Fraser	10,350	35.6	−6.4
Total formal votes		29,050	97.2	
Informal votes		829	2.8	
Turnout		29,879	74.2	
Labor hold		Swing	+6.4	

==== 1913 ====
1913 Australian federal election: Herbert
Party	Candidate	Votes	%	±%
Labor	Fred Bamford	16,709	58.0	+0.4
Liberal	John Mann	12,081	42.0	−0.4
Total formal votes		28,790	96.1	
Informal votes		1,172	3.9	
Turnout		29,926	76.4	
Labor hold		Swing	+0.4	

==== 1910 ====
1910 Australian federal election: Herbert
Party	Candidate	Votes	%	±%
Labour	Fred Bamford	13,668	61.0	+8.1
Liberal	Thomas Crawford	8,751	39.0	−8.1
Total formal votes		22,419	96.7	
Informal votes		765	3.3	
Turnout		23,184	61.5	
Labour hold		Swing	+8.1	

=== Elections in the 1900s ===
==== 1906 ====
1906 Australian federal election: Herbert
Party	Candidate	Votes	%	±%
Labour	Fred Bamford	8,151	52.9	−4.9
Anti-Socialist	Walter Tunbridge	7,255	47.1	+47.1
Total formal votes		15,406	95.3	
Informal votes		764	4.7	
Turnout		16,170	50.8	
Labour hold		Swing	−4.9	

==== 1903 ====
1903 Australian federal election: Herbert
Party	Candidate	Votes	%	±%
Labor	Fred Bamford	8,965	57.8	+6.2
Protectionist	William White	6,549	42.2	−6.2
Total formal votes		15,514	95.5	
Informal votes		727	4.5	
Turnout		16,241	63.2	
Labour hold		Swing	+6.2	

==== 1901 ====
1901 Australian federal election: Herbert
Party	Candidate	Votes	%	±%
Labour	Fred Bamford	3,353	51.6	+51.6
Protectionist	William Brown	3,140	48.4	+48.4
Total formal votes		6,493	96.8	
Informal votes		217	3.2	
Turnout		6,710	66.6	
Labour win		(new seat)		
