= Boiling down =

Rendering the fat from animal carcasses

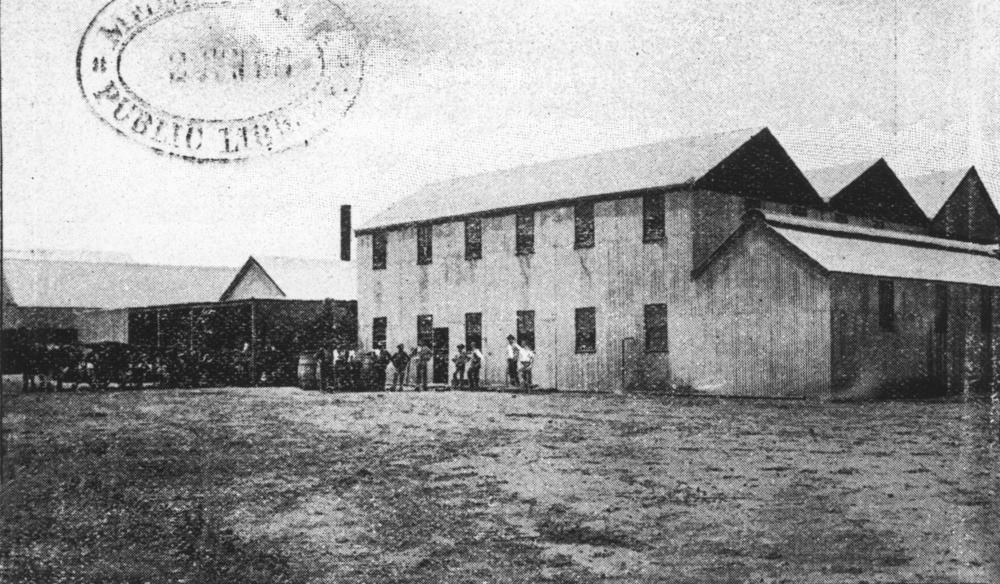
StateLibQld 2 15810 Woolscouring and Boiling Down Works, Longreach, 1898

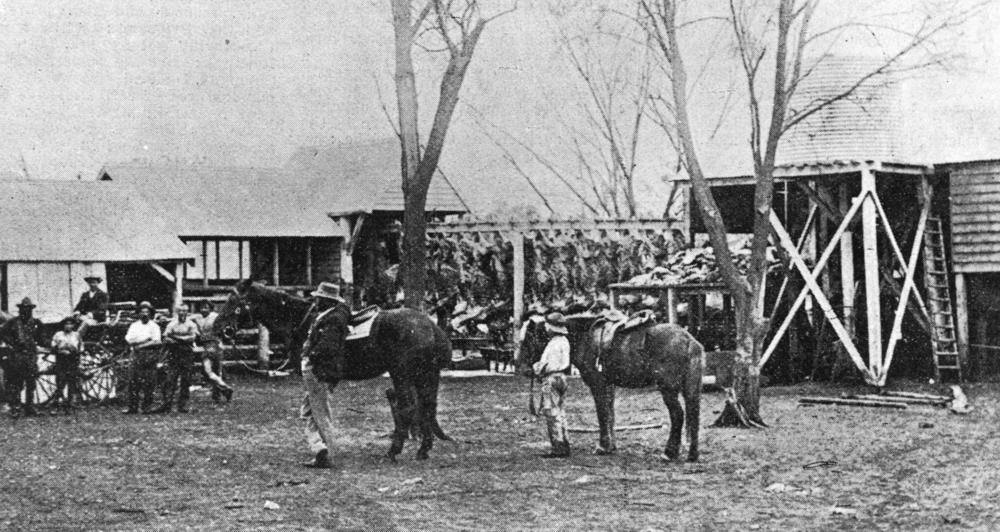
StateLibQld 2 40883 Armstrong's Boiling Down Works, Charleville, 1898

Boiling down was the term used in Australia for the process of rendering the fat from animal carcasses to produce tallow. It was a common activity on farms and pastoral properties to produce tallow to be made into soap and candles for domestic use.

Boiling down was industrialised in the 1840s, providing the rural sector with a valuable export commodity. It was particularly significant as it came during the 1840s economic depression when the pastoral industry was at a standstill and sheep and cattle otherwise had little value in the colonies.

== Beginnings ==
The export market for Australian wool suffered a severe price slump in the 1840s. Low demand for cattle and sheep to stock new pastoral runs and the small local market for beef, mutton or lamb meant cattle and sheep had little value in the colonies. Boiling-down works provided a vital source of income to the squatters when sheep were selling for as low as sixpence each. Pastoralist George Russell built a boiling works at Golf Hill Station, in the Western District (Victoria), and expressed his belief that, "melting down the Stock has been the salvation of the colonies."

Henry O'Brien of Yass experimented with boiling down sheep in large cauldrons to extract the tallow (fat for soap and candle making). He publicised his experiments in an article that appeared in The Sydney Morning Herald on 19 June 1843. It was reprinted in various other colonial newspapers and is credited with kick-starting the production of tallow as a new export industry in rural Australia. Even when the wool price recovered, boiling down works helped maintain a minimum price for sheep of around five shillings per head.

Langlands and Fulton operated an iron foundry at 131 Flinders St West, Melbourne, Australia, where Fulton developed a technique for boiling-down sheep for tallow around in 1843-44 when squatters slaughtered their otherwise worthless sheep in the thousands due to a rural depression.

In Victoria, Joseph Raleigh is credited with one of the first large scale boiling-down works, when in 1840 he erected a plant near the Stoney Creek Backwash in Yarraville. From a very small quantity of 50 tons of tallow produced in 1843, to 430 in tons in 1844, over 4500 tons, worth £130,000 were produced in 1850 in Victoria alone.

Robert King opened the first boiling down works in the Bremer River area of Ipswich, Queensland in 1847, followed by John Campbell and John Smith, creating a self-contained village of Town Marie.

Windermere (NSW) located in the Hunter Valley was one of the early sites for boiling down. By 1868, Windermere was described as a “Boiling-down establishment capable of boiling down 900 to 1000 sheep daily.” (Maitland Mercury 4 January 1868).

Alligator Creek meatworks was opened in 1877 near Townsville and was important for the early economy. In 1942, the Meatworks processed 5,478,000 cans of preserved meat for the season (62,675 cattle and 23,481 sheep) which was more than the Ross River meatworks (42,000 cattle) and the Merinda meatworks (Bowen), at Bowen (29,000 cattle).

== Factory operations ==
Ross River Meatworks in Townsville (opened June 1892) in August 1892 was described by industry experts as works as "superior to any in the colony - actively engaged in the meat export trade".

This plant was coal powered. It had six Babcock and Wilcox 96-horsepower tubular boilers supplying steam for the various engines. In the freezing room, the two compound engines could produce 400 horsepower each and each machine could circulate 170,000 cubic feet of air per hour.

Cattle and sheep were separately processed. The carcases were transported around the factory by an overhead tramway. The tramway then transported meat to a cooling room, then to the freezing, canning or preserving rooms as required.

The refrigeration machinery was a combination of Bell-Coleman and Haslam machines, which circulated cold air and removed moisture and impure air at the same time. Electric lighting was installed 31 years prior to the provision of public electric lighting in Townsville. It was powered by a Crompton dynamo and installed by Barton and White electrical engineers.

Workers of the Meatworks came from the local area or nearby towns. Due to the large amount of workers at the factories, there were often industrial disputes with local employees about working hours and other matters including industrial strikes. One worker joined the Alligator Creek meatworks at the age of 13 years old and worked there for 58 years.

An 1893 report from the Queensland Stock-breeders and Graziers' Association indicates the scale operations of the proposed Broadsound Boiling Down and Meat Export Company registered in June that year:

The works are to start on a modest scale, and the company intend to confine their operations to boiling down and salting for the present. The plant will probably consist of two digesters of ten-head capacity each per twelve hours, and coolers and clarifiers enough to admit of the work being carried on day and night, so that forty head of cattle could be disposed of every twenty-four hours.

== Environmental impact ==
The environmental impact of boiling down works is significant, as documented for Wentworth Park in Sydney which:

was originally the swampy mouth of the creek variously known as Black Wattle or Blackwattle Creek. Between the 1830s and 1860 various noxious industries were established along the shore, including in particular abattoirs and boiling down works. The pollution from these works so polluted the swamp that, even after the removal of these establishments from the area in 1860, the local council lobbied to have the area filled in because of the stench that continued to arise from the water and mud

The Alligator Creek meatworks effluent (cattle/sheep blood-rich) was pumped into a local creek, affecting fish stocks.

== Cultural references ==
'Boiling Downs' is the scene of a massacre in Jack Mathieu's 1901 comic poem That Day at Boiling Downs
