= Idalia, Queensland =

Idalia
- Suburb
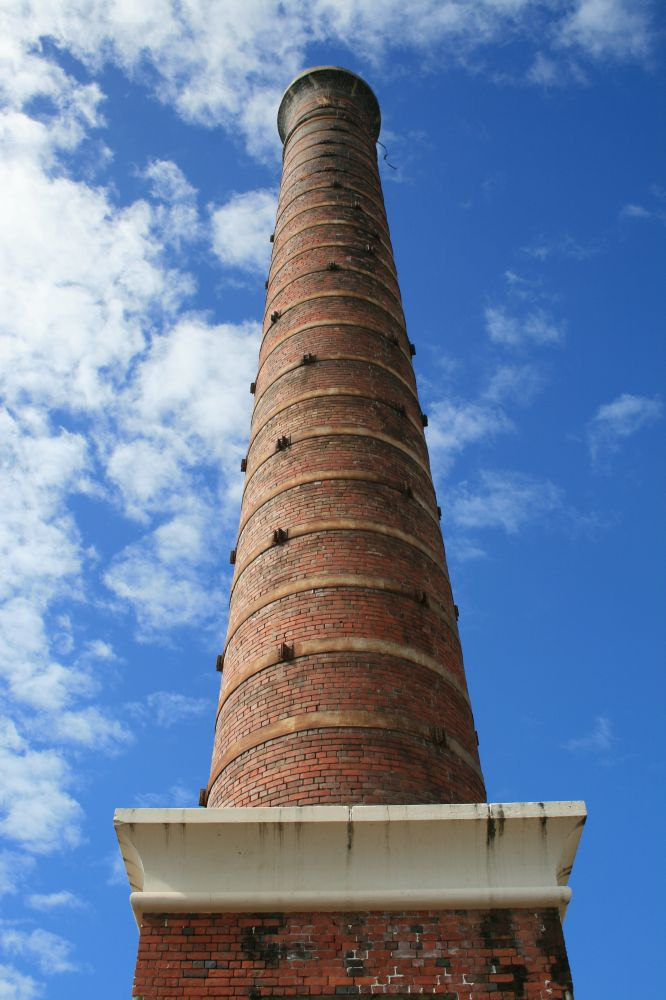
- Ross River Meatworks Chimney, 2009

- Interactive map of Idalia
- Coordinates: 19.3072°S 146.8119°E
- Country: Australia
- State: Queensland
- City: Townsville
- LGA: City of Townsville
- Location: 5.2 km (3.2 mi) S of Townsville CBD; 355 km (221 mi) SSE of Cairns; 1,328 km (825 mi) NNW of Brisbane

Government
  - State electorate: Mundingburra
  - Federal division: Herbert

Area
  - Total: 3.5 km^{2} (1.4 sq mi)

Population
  - Total: 4,563 (2021 census)
  - Density: 1,304/km^{2} (3,380/sq mi)
- Time zone: UTC+10:00 (AEST)
- Postcode: 4811
Suburbs around Idalia
Rosslea	Oonoonba	Oonoonba
Annandale	Idalia	Oonoonba
Annandale	Wulguru	Cluden

Idalia is a southern suburb in the City of Townsville, Queensland, Australia. In the 2021 census, Idalia had a population of 4,563 people.

== Geography ==
Idalia is bounded by the North Coast railway line to the east, the median strip of Racecourse Road to the south, the median strip of Stuart Drive to the south-west, and by the Ross River to the north-west.

The Bruce Highway runs along the southern boundary, Townsville Connection Road along the western boundary, and South Townsville Road along the eastern.

There are three saltwater lakes in Idalia, created as part of the Fairfield Waters subdivision to manage excess water during the wet season.

Idalia is situated between the suburbs of Annandale, Oonoonba, Cluden and Wulguru.

Quealban is a neighbourhood (19.3°S 146.8166°E) around the former Quealban railway station (19.2975°S 146.8171°E) on the North Coast railway line. Two other abandoned railway stations on that line in the suburb are:

- Oonoonba railway station (19.3006°S 146.8183°E)
- Cluden railway station (19.3173°S 146.8234°E)

== History ==
The name Quealban was assigned by the Queensland Railways Department on 22 May 1914 and is an Aboriginal word meaning curlew.

Oonoonba State School opened on 15 November 1920.

Idalia was once a light-industrial suburb of the city, but in recent years, with the initiation of the Fairfield Waters subdivision development, the suburb has rapidly expanded (in terms of establishments) and nearly tripled in size.

The suburb was significantly impacted by the 2019 Townsville flood with a majority of residential and commercial properties inundated to some extent. The velodrome was damaged and received a $2 million grant to replace it.

== Demographics ==
In the 2016 census, Idalia had a population of 4,438 people.

In the 2021 census, Idalia had a population of 4,563 people.

== Heritage listings ==
Idalia has a number of heritage-listed sites, including:

- Ross River Meatworks Chimney, Stuart Drive (19.305°S 146.8042°E)

== Education ==
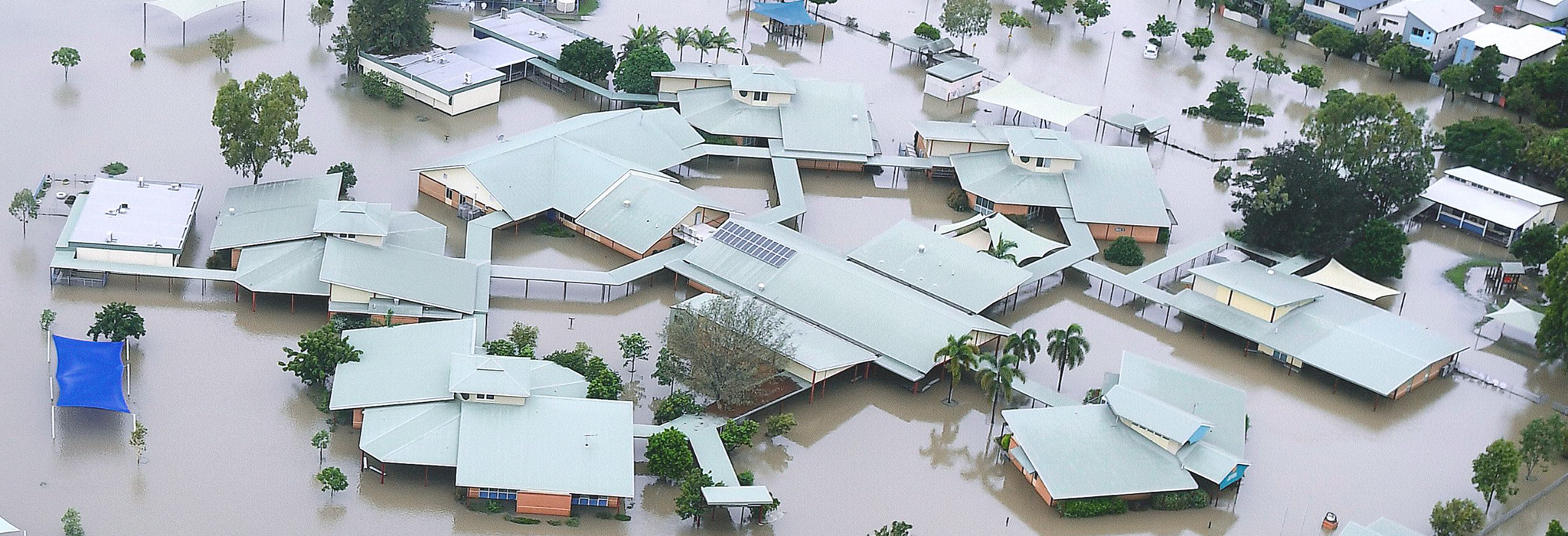
Oonoonba State School during the 2019 Townsville flood

Oonoonba State School is a government primary (Prep–6) school for boys and girls at Fairfield Waters Drive (19.3045°S 146.8122°E). In 2017 the school had an enrolment of 524 students with 46 teachers (38 full-time equivalent) and 30 non-teaching staff (17 full-time equivalent). In 2018, the school had an enrolment of 501 students with 40 teachers (34 full-time equivalent) and 27 non-teaching staff (16 full-time equivalent). It includes a special education program.

There are no secondary schools in Idalia. The nearest government secondary school is William Ross State High School in neighbouring Annandale to the south-east.

== Amenities ==
Fairfield Central shopping centre is at corner of Waterfront Parade and Lakeside Drive (19.3153°S 146.8177°E).

Townsville Velodrome is a sports cycling centre at 46-92 Stuart Drive (19.3111°S 146.8086°E). It has a banked velodrome and is operated by the Townsville Cycle Club.

Townsville District Pony Club operates from Pony Club Reserve at 92 Stuart Drive (19.3095°S 146.8095°E).

There are a number of parks in the area:

- Lakeshore Circuit park (19.3010°S 146.8130°E)
- Gordon Creek park at 94-194 Stuart Drive (19.3123°S 146.8117°E)
- Edgewater Circuit park (19.2961°S 146.8116°E)
