= Ross River Meatworks Chimney =

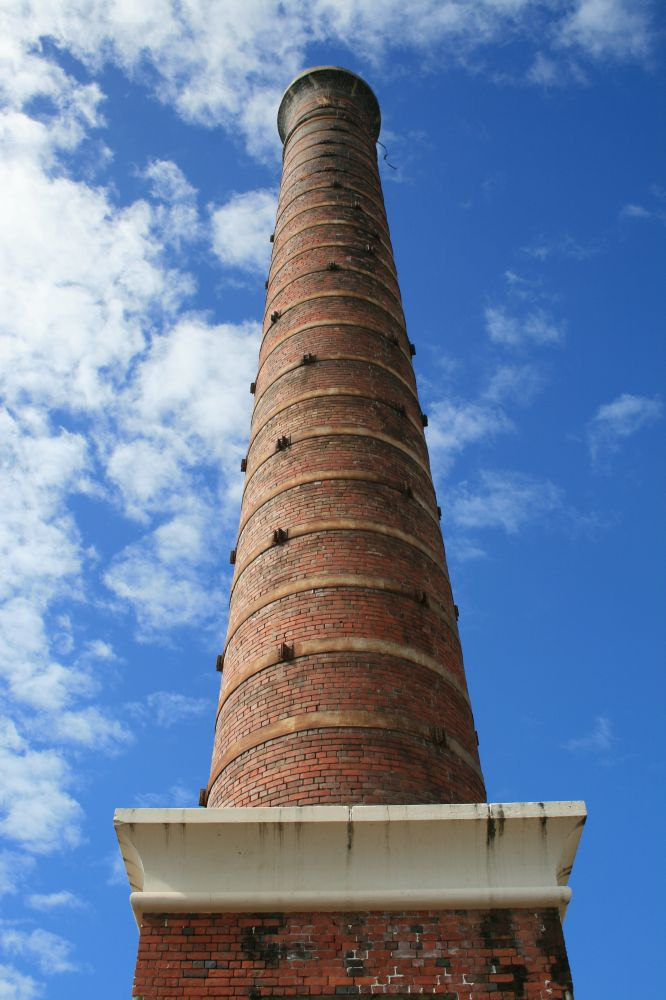
- Ross River Meatworks Chimney, 2009

- Location within Queensland
- 19.305°S 146.8042°E
- Location: Stuart Drive, Idalia, City of Townsville, Queensland, Australia

History
- Built: 1891

Queensland Heritage Register
- Official name: Ross River Meatworks Chimney
- Type: state heritage (archaeological, built)
- Designated: 14 August 2009
- Reference no.: 602719
- Significant period: 1891–1995
- Significant components: chimney/chimney stack, abattoir/slaughter house (commercial)
- Builders: William McCallum Park

The Ross River Meatworks Chimney is a heritage-listed abattoir at Stuart Drive, Idalia, City of Townsville, Queensland, Australia. It is the 11th tallest structure in Townsville. It was built as part of the Ross River Meatworks in 1891 William McCallum Park and is now a major landmark as part of Fairfield Waters and part of Lancinis Springbank urban village. It was listed on the Queensland Heritage Register on 14 August 2009.

== History ==
The Ross River Meatworks was established by the Queensland Meat Export and Agency Company during 1891–1892 as the first purpose-built meat freezing works in Queensland. Located on the banks of Ross River in suburban Townsville, the 130-foot (40 m) high brick chimney remains the principal surviving evidence of an important meatworks in Queensland during the late nineteenth century and early twentieth century. The only Queensland meatworks from this era still in operation is at Lakes Creek, near Rockhampton, established in 1871 for the production of canned beef before shifting to frozen beef for export in the 1880s. Its early brick chimney has not survived.

Although the wool industry was the impetus for early pastoral activity in Queensland, cattle soon proved better suited to the wetter conditions in northern areas. However, early development of a Queensland cattle industry was hindered by the lack of a sufficiently large market for fresh beef. In the 1860s excess stock were disposed of by selling to other graziers or to boiling down works.

Ports to service the new pastoral runs being taken up in northern and far north-western Queensland in the early 1860s were established at Port Denison (Bowen) in 1861 and Cleveland Bay (Townsville) in 1864, with Cleveland Bay declared a Port of Entry in 1865. Entrepreneur and businessman Robert Towns (after whom Townsville is named) and his business partner John Melton Black founded the settlement at Cleveland Bay to supply their pastoral leases in the hinterland.

By the mid-1860s, drought and recession had led to a collapse in the pastoral industry in north Queensland. In order to salvage some profit, squatters turned to the boiling down of sheep and cattle for tallow (for candles and soap). Hoofs and horns were utilised for oil, and hides for leather. In 1864 a number of small-scale boiling down works were established on pastoral properties in the Kennedy and gulf districts, but the boiling down industry became more professional in 1866, when Towns & Co. opened a boiling down plant at Cleveland Bay, and Morehead & Young, partners in the Scottish Australian Pastoral Company, opened a similar operation on the Albert River where the settlement of Burketown had been established in 1865. Neither of these establishments survived for any length of time. At Cleveland Bay, the Queensland Meat Export Company established a meatworks south of Townsville on Alligator Creek in 1879, using some of the equipment from Towns' factory. This became commonly known as the Alligator Creek meatworks.

Following the discovery of gold at Charters Towers in 1871, a railway from Townsville to the goldfield was constructed between 1879 and 1882. The first trains carried both gold and wool from local graziers back to the port of Townsville. Demand led to the approval of a western extension to Hughenden to service the cattle grazing industry. The Northern Railway opened in 1887 and soon became the most profitable in Queensland as graziers took up land along its route. During the 1870s the increase in population at newly opened Queensland gold fields, particularly on the Palmer River, provided a ready market for beef. By the end of the decade there was an oversupply. Following the drought of 1884–1886 cattle were driven overland to southern markets, but droving costs led to a huge reduction in profitability. There was a need to establish a processing industry in north Queensland to supply meat for an export market. Frozen meat proved to be the solution.

Australian experimentation with meat-freezing works and the fitting out of refrigerated ships to carry frozen meat to Britain was initiated in Sydney and Melbourne, with mixed results. Refinements in processing and shipping led to a successful shipment in 1880. The Central Queensland Meat Export Company's works at Lakes Creek installed freezing equipment in 1883, but was burnt down shortly after. A meat freezing works was established at Poole Island off Bowen in 1884, but its first shipment was lost in a tornado. In 1889 the North Queensland Meat Export Company restarted the Alligator Creek works, initially for boiling down and preserving, and later utilising the freezing equipment from Poole Island.

In November 1890 the Queensland Meat and Export Agency Company formed with the intention of establishing purpose-built meat freezing works at Townsville and in Brisbane. By February 1891, following the subscription of shares, it was decided to proceed with construction of a meatworks at Townsville. Plans were made for a second works at Eagle Farm in Brisbane mid year. A contract was entered into with the British India Steam Navigation Company to transport the meat to Britain.

Six acres (2.43ha) of land on the banks of Ross River were acquired from the Idalia Land Company in August 1891 and twenty-five acres (10.12ha) of crown land were allocated nearby for drafting yards. A short branch line to the railway linked the works with the wharves. Construction began in September 1891 under the supervision of contractor William McCallum Park. By late September the site was laid out, concrete foundations were in place and construction of workers cottages had commenced. A light tramway was built to haul sand for the concrete from the riverbank. The works was to be steam-driven, necessitating the construction of a huge brick chimney. The foundations for the chimney consisted of a square of concrete built 5 feet (1.5 m) deep to support the 130 feet (40 m) tall brick superstructure. The bricks were baked on site.

The Ross River Meatworks Chimney was one of at least 30 nineteenth century industrial brick chimneys in the Townsville region (extending north to Ingham, south to the Burdekin River and west to Cloncurry), marking the sites of steam-driven pyrites works, batteries, mines, sawmills, brick works, water works, soap works, breweries, meat works and sugar mills. Most were the work of highly skilled bricklayers. The chimneys took a variety of forms, including square, round and hexagonal. Some round or hexagonal chimneys were constructed on square plinths, as at the Ross River Meatworks. They were markers of the steam age in nineteenth century Queensland. The Ross River Meatworks Chimney is the only surviving nineteenth century brick chimney in the immediate Townsville area. Regionally, the 1889 brick chimney at the former Burdekin River Pumping Station at Charters Towers (Burdekin River Pumping Station) also survives.

Despite on-going industrial action by carpenters and bricklayers, the Ross River Meatworks began operation on 28 June 1892. The plant was coal powered, with six Babcock and Wilcox 96-horsepower safety tubular boilers supplying steam for the various engines. Cattle and sheep were processed separately. An overhead tramway transported the carcasses to a cooling room, then into the freezing, canning or preserving rooms. In the freezing room, the two compound engines could produce 400 horsepower each and each machine could circulate 170,000 cubic feet (4,800 m^{3}) of air per hour. The freezing and cold storage building was about 100 feet (30 m) square and two storeys high. The refrigeration machinery was a combination of Bell-Coleman and Haslam machines, which circulated cold air and removed moisture and impure air at the same time. Electric lighting powered by a Crompton dynamo was installed by Barton and White electrical engineers - 31 years prior to the provision of public electric lighting in Townsville. In August 1892 the Ross River meatworks was inspected by New Zealand industry experts, who described the works as "superior to any in the colony - actively engaged in the meat export trade".

The company had a difficult time in its first year of production and initial shipments of meat from Townsville were unsuccessful. Transport from Ross River was problematic with the meat taken by rail to the Townsville wharf, then loaded aboard a lighter, and reloaded for shipping to London. It is unclear which part of the process failed, but the first shipment arrived in London in early December 1892 in a putrid state. At the same time the directors had taken out further loans because of numerous unforeseen expenses in the construction of both meatworks. The next shipment to reach England in mid-January included meat from the company's recently opened Eagle Farm meatworks, but was partially spoilt. The 1893 Brisbane floods silted up the Brisbane River inhibiting coastal shipping and halting production from both meatworks for some time. Another shipment of Townsville meat which arrived in London in May was also found to be tainted. The company overcame its early problems and appointed a new director, William Forrest in January 1893. He soon became Chairman of the Board and is credited with turning the company into a successful enterprise.

The Meat and Dairy Produce Encouragement Act 1893 provided loans for meat and dairy works funded through a tax on sheep and cattle. The Queensland Meat and Export Agency Company applied for funds to duplicate and upgrade both the Townsville and Eagle Farms works. The agents for Linde British Refrigeration, J Wildridge and Sinclair Ltd, were contracted to undertake the extension projects. The £30,000 extension at Ross River doubled the freezing capacity. The four new store rooms could hold 200 short tons (180 t) each and the chilling room could hold 120 bullocks. Other additions included new engine and boiler houses, a fresh water reservoir and pumping station and additional slaughtering yards and pens. By the time the extensions were completed in April 1895, the meatworks was reported to have processed 50,000 head of cattle and 13,000 sheep since opening. An international study of the frozen meat trade, published in 1912, stated that the Townsville works of QME&A was the most up to date freezing works in existence in either hemisphere. It also had the largest capacity of any meatworks in Australasia at this time.

Ongoing upgrades ensured the best and most economic equipment and methodologies were employed. Even during the drought and the problems associated with ticks in the early 1900s, the Ross River Meatworks was producing more meat than any other establishment in Australasia. In 1901 the company purchased the works of the Burketown Meat Export Co. which operated as a canning works. In 1903 it began purchasing significant grazing properties in north Queensland to engage in fattening cattle and breeding. It contracted to supply beef to American forces based in the Philippines in 1898 and established a cold-storage warehouse in Singapore in 1903. Evidence given by the Eagle Farm manager Charles Ross to the Royal Commission into the Meat Industry in October 1912 indicated that Ross River was at that time processing 3000 cattle a week and new cold storage facilities were under construction. By 1915 the company restructured, forming two organisations - the Queensland Meat Export and Agency Co Ltd (QME&A) and Australia Stock Breeders Company Ltd.

During 1918–1919 there was a series of protracted strikes at the Ross River and Alligator Creek meatworks, which began with the workers' rejection of compulsory arbitration in favour of direct bargaining. They staged ongoing wildcat strikes and go-slow campaigns to achieve their aims. At the same time the companies wanted to remove a clause from employment contracts giving preference to union members, which they achieved for a short time, hiring returned servicemen in place of industrial activists. Support was then offered by the Queensland Rail Union and the Waterside Workers Federation and the strikes continued. By July 1919 the ongoing dispute degenerated to the point where riots occurred in Townsville with police firing shots to disperse the crowd of 1000 people who were protesting the imprisonment of strike leaders. This strike is regarded as one of the most ferocious in Australian history. In 1920 the Arbitration Court restored a modified union preference clause into the employment contracts.

By 1921, the beef export trade had collapsed because it was no longer receiving preferential treatment from the British government. Also the Navigation Act of 1921 prevented international ships from being used to carry local goods. The QME&A recorded its biggest loss of £80,000. The Eagle Farm works was mothballed in 1933 in the hope that beef prices would improve. It was demolished in 1938. In 1933, Ross River began exporting chilled beef. The establishment of the Australian Meat Board (AMB) in 1936 regulated the flow of meat to the overseas market and licensed suitable ships to ensure that the best quality meat reached the market. In 1937 the AMB allocated 82.25 per cent of the total Australian export of chilled meat to Queensland abattoirs.

While the Ross River meatworks had been the largest and most up to date during the 1910s, it was surpassed by other establishments in the following 40 years. Lakes Creek and the Brisbane Abattoirs had larger capacities by the 1950s. Ross River works were run down by then and suffered considerable losses in 1951 and 1954, due to prolonged industrial disputes, increasing wages, drought and government controls on exports. In 1955 the Vestey company bought the meatworks and began replacing old dilapidated buildings and introduced new killing and processing mechanised operations, reducing staff. In the late 1950s the works changed from coal-fired to oil-fired boilers with Lightfoot ammonia compressors. The change from coal to oil also negated the need for coal handlers. In 1961 a partnership was formed with the Angliss Group. Export markets changed from the United Kingdom to America during the 1960s and in more recent times to Japan, Korea and South East Asia. The meatworks remained the major employer in Townsville and by 1990 had a record year, processing 93,601 beasts, handling 27 percent of the north Queensland production. This result was achieved despite industrial action during 1990. However, a further downturn occurred as a consequence of the 1991–2 recession.

=== Demolition of the works ===
In 1992 Vestey sold the meatworks to Smorgon Consolidated Industries. During the early 1990s the Australian meat trade began exporting live meat but unions argued that the planned export of 500,000 head of cattle in 1995 was akin to exporting 150,000 jobs. Despite an unusual alliance between the union and animal liberation activists aimed at stopping the live meat trade, they were unsuccessful. Smorgon announced the closure of the Ross River meatworks in February 1995 arguing that the business was no longer profitable because of drought, live cattle exports and the falling Australian dollar, and it was part of a general divestment of company assets at the time. With the exception of the chimney and an office building, all other buildings and structures on the site were demolished in 1997.

In 1999 a scheme was proposed for a housing estate on the site, with the chimney a feature of planned parkland. At that time $58,000 was spent on sandblasting the chimney and stripping and restoring the metal strapping. The developer had planned to include the establishment of a small brewery alongside the chimney in the old office building, but this part of the project did not proceed and the former office building has been demolished.

=== Redevelopment ===
The Meatworks along with its 40-metre (130 ft) tall stack, stayed empty for two years until the land was bought by the developer of Fairfield waters, who looked upon the stack and the three gable buildings alongside it as something the public would like, had plans of turning the chimney as a public monument and three buildings into a brewery alongside the meatworks. But this never happened because reports showed the three old gable buildings were structurally damaged and were demolished before structure improvements were offered. The chimney which was the only sound feature on the site was left to remain.

In 2008, developer Lancini, was planning to demolish it so he could build a resort on the site, as an engineering report commissioned by Lancini Group found it was too unstable and old to preserve, but residents of Townsville didn't believe the report by Lancini Group and began a local fight to save the stack. Jenny Hanlon (Leader of the fight) gained support from the local community via Text to the Editor in the Townsville Bulletin newspaper. This forced ALP State Member Lindy Nelson-Carr to act. She then ordered a professional report into the stacks' structural integrity. The report found that the chimney could stay and there was a government fight over who would foot the bill. At the same time, Lindy Nelson-Carr put the chimney on the heritage list and the engineers of Heritage Queensland said it was perfect for the Heritage Register. The Chimney remains standing today and is surrounded by TESSA Residential's Springbank Urban village. The Chimney cost $200,000 to fix, but the Townsville City Council said it was worth it for the 120-year-old stack.

== Description ==
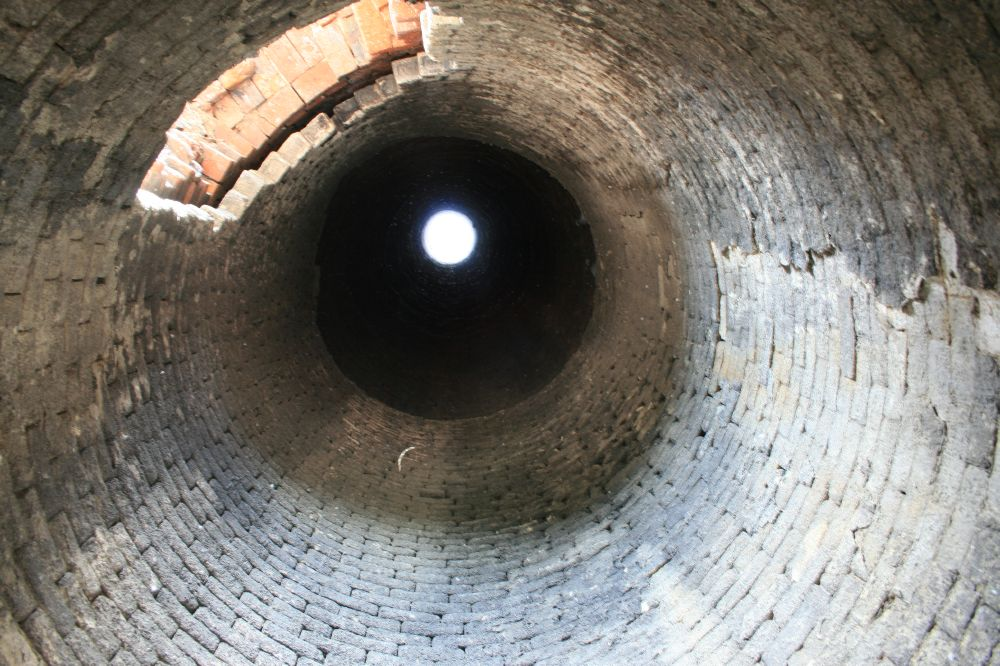
Looking up the chimney, 2009

The Ross River Meatworks Chimney stands on the south bank of the Ross River approximately 150 metres (490 ft) downstream from the south abutment of the Ross River Bridge in the suburb of Idalia in south Townsville. In 2009, the chimney stands in the north of a large, vacant residential subdivision, part of the Fairfield Waters development in south Townsville.

The chimney is a brick structure with an outer skin of red facebrick. It comprises a base and a tapering stack. The base is expressed as a plinth, square in plan and approximately 8.6 metres (28 ft) high. The stack, approximately 31 metres (102 ft) high, flares out at the top to take a plain, splayed, concrete crown.

The plinth is distinguished by a plain oversized cornice and the northwest, northeast and southeast faces are relieved by an indented rectangular mid-panel defined by a bevelled cement perimeter band. The plinth corners are tapered to take a decorative concrete moulded roll. The southwest face accommodates the arched opening to the base. This can be covered by a dropping counter-weighted heavy metal door. The northwest face of the plinth has bricks punched out about two-thirds the way up.

A lightning strap is dislodged at the top of the stack but remains fixed to the southeast face of the stack and plinth, terminating at the ground. Metal straps wrap around the stack at regular intervals. A 400-millimetre (16 in) wide concrete drain runs along the southeast side of the plinth.

Two circular (5.6-metre (18 ft) diameter) concrete upstands, 300 millimetres (12 in) thick and 400 millimetres (16 in) high, stand in line to the northwest.

A public walking/cycling track winds along the south bank of the Ross River and as it passes the chimney it is about 20 metres (66 ft) from the face of the plinth.

== Heritage listing ==
Ross River Meatworks Chimney was listed on the Queensland Heritage Register on 14 August 2009 having satisfied the following criteria.

The place is important in demonstrating the evolution or pattern of Queensland's history.

The Ross River Meatworks Chimney is important surviving evidence of the link between north Queensland pastoralism and the development of frozen and chilled meat as an important export industry for Queensland. The landmark structure is associated with the first purpose-built meat freezing works in Queensland, which operated for over a century from 1892 to 1995, producing frozen and later chilled meat for the export market. In the early 1900s it had the largest capacity of any meatworks in Australasia. Proclaimed by independent observers as "superior to any in the colony" in 1892, and "the most up to date freezing works in either hemisphere" in 1912, the Ross River meatworks processed cattle and sheep from across northern Queensland, the Northern Territory and the Kimberley Ranges of Western Australia and exported meat worldwide. The meatworks was a major employer in Townsville, an important Queensland regional centre.

Located on a former railway line less than 5 kilometres (3.1 mi) from a major port, the chimney remains important evidence of how nineteenth century export industries were dependent on Queensland's early network of railways linked to ports and shipping that connected with world markets. It is also surviving evidence of the reliance of early Queensland industry on steam-driven power.

The place is important in demonstrating the principal characteristics of a particular class of cultural places.

The Ross River Meatworks Chimney consists of an 8.6-metre (28 ft) high firebox with a 31-metre (102 ft) high chimney stack, constructed from bricks made on site and mortar made with sand from the Ross River. It demonstrates a substantial level of intactness and a high degree of integrity. As the only remaining nineteenth century meatworks brick chimney in Queensland and one of few early industrial brick chimneys surviving in the Townsville region, it is important in illustrating the principal characteristics of its type.

The place is important because of its aesthetic significance.

The 39.6-metre (130 ft) high structure is prominent in the landscape of the Ross River floodplain as it has been since its construction in 1892. Through its intactness, integrity and magnitude, the chimney remains a landmark along the Flinders Highway (Stuart Drive).

== See also ==
- Ross River
- Alligator Creek meatworks
- Merinda meatworks (Bowen)
