= Windermere House, New South Wales =

Heritage listed house in New South Wales, Australia

Windermere
- Interactive map of the Windermere area
- Alternative names: Windermere Homestead, Windermere House

General information
- Location: Windermere, New South Wales, Australia
- Coordinates: 32.674°S 151.443°E
- Current tenants: Christopher and Deidre Kay
- Named for: Thomas Melville White Winder
- Construction started: 1821
- Completed: (at least by 1824)
- Owner: Originally owned/ built by Thomas “Tom” Melville White Winder, later Charles William Wentworth, Charles Solomon Capp (and others after the Capp family), current owner unknown

Technical details
- Floor count: two storeys (basement and main level)

Design and construction
- Architects: Originally owned/ built/designed by Thomas “Tom” Melville White Winder, later Charles William Wentworth made additions to it, Charles Solomon Capp rebuilt two wings after a fire (and others in the Capp family made additional renovations)
- Known for: Being the oldest house in the Hunter Valley and being built with convict labour.

Other information
- Number of rooms: 30

Windermere (in NSW) is a historical house, built in 1821 (1823 per). It is the oldest house in the Hunter Valley and is heritage listed. Located in the outskirts of Lochinvar, it was built on a land grant and constructed from convict bricks and lime render. The lime render has been etched to give the appearance of block construction. There is now a suburb also called Windermere, New South Wales on the lands where the extended Windermere estate lands were located.

Thomas White Melville Winder was granted the land and commissioned the house using convicts as the source of labour and workmanship. Convicts are believed to be housed on the estate in the 1820s. Winder is credited with growing the first grapes in the Hunter Region. Windermere was reportedly the favourite residence of William Charles Wentworth (son of D'Arcy Wentworth). This house is of great historical significance.

== History ==
Thomas (“Tom” or “Thom”) White Melville Winder (1787-1853) was born in England in 1787 (1789 per, 1779 per), some details around his parentage and time of birth are unable to be confirmed. The lecture at the Newcastle University suggested that he was born in 1779 as the illegitimate son of the Arthur Wellesley Duke of Wellington and Lady Mary Melville. He was captain in the Merchant Navy. He came to Sydney (NSW, Australia) on 20 November 1817 on the ship Frederick, and married Ellen Johnstone (spelt Johnson by) on 26 December 1848. They became parents to at least two sons and seven daughters. He died on 30 September 1853, choking on cayenne pepper in Maitland, NSW at the age of 66 (?), and was buried in Telarah (a suburb of Maitland). Winder was a sea captain and later became a successful pastoralist and businessman. He was well known to Charles Wentworth including in business ventures which was of mutual benefit during the depression times. Although Winder was a merchant, he abandoned trading after a deal with a Captain Ritchie went wrong. He failed to bring a promised cargo from Calcutta and Winder sustained financial losses. Winder established a water mill for grinding flour at Botany Bay. Windermere was reportedly the favourite residence of William Charles Wentworth and he divided his time there and at Vaucluse.

Winder became friends with the Governor Lachlan Macquarie. He was offered significant grants of land, but there is some evidence that he only accepted what he thought he really needed for his family, the community and for the growth of the area. He received land in the Hunter Valley including in Lochinvar (1,600 ha (4,000 acres) in the mid 1820s).

It was problematic for farmers in the area when persons from the local Aboriginal community took some of the produce from the farm without a mutual understanding. There was a person of Aboriginal descent living on Winder property (around Windermere) affectionately called the “Constable”. He may have assisted in liaising with the local Aboriginal population and as an interpreter. Mr Winder bestowed a breastplate inscribed “King Cobra – Maitland”. It is suggested that these persons of Aboriginal descent were respected for their work in keeping the residence and surrounding properties safe from non-local persons of Aboriginal descent and checking the activities of workers (perhaps including the activities of convicts) at the farm.

Winder had purchased 130 ha (320 acres) from Luke Dillon and a grant of 810 ha (2,000 acres) was transferred to him by Henry Hawes. It was on these acres that the Windermere house was built in 1821. (per 1821-1827) Convicts were housed on the estate and in the cellar in the 1820s. Convicts were the source of workmanship and labour. In 1823 Winder accompanied Lieutenant William Hicks to the Hunter. The estate of the two men became close-by.

Winder opened up farming for wheat at the property.

Government policy and recommendation at the time was for convicts to be kept away from “Sydney temptations” and learn useful skills in order to reform and settle in as community members. Private and merchant farmers were seen as targets that could provide this training in order to help these people learn skills and integrate into the community. “Windermere” would have been a source of such education. The idea of training and education was actively promoted by Charles William Wentworth who addressed the Legislative Council, on September 6, 1849 on the importance of instituting a university for the promotion of literature and science and that this cost would be to a public expense. October 3, 1849, Wentworth's speech regarding starting the University of Sydney as a gift “to the child of every man, of every class, to become great and useful in the destinies of his country.” William Charles Wentworth fought for the rights of ex-convicts to be citizens, to vote and to be free of taxes other than those imposed by legislation and encouraged free migration. He also fought for proper processes for trials by a jury and appeals.

Convicts were relocated to Port Macquarie in 1822. The Newcastle area was available for free settlers and emancipated convicts. The house being built around 1821-1823 was likely to have had convict labourers. The house was lived in by the time of 1824. Previously inhabited by farmers and convicts, it was recorded that the Winders left Sydney to reside in the house on 1 June 1824. A dairy was started in 1827.

William Charles Wentworth extended the house and also became Winder's business partner.

William Charles Wentworth wanted to purchase the Windermere Estate from Thomas White Melville Winder but was unable to raise the funds. The Luskintyre estate was available for the Wentworth/Winder business. On 1 April 1835 Williams Charles Wentworth purchased the properties and mortgaged the estates to Winder on the same day.

Wentworth lived in at the estate for several months each year. Wentworth later extended the homestead into a thirty room house including cellars, stables, a coach house and a vineyard.

The Winder family moved to Campbell House located on Campbell's Hill (Maitland, NSW). On 7 April 1840, this house (“Windermere”) was advertised for sale. The position on a hill in this advertisement was described as an advantage as the area had recent flooding described as an “annoyance” and “detrimental to the town”.

Charles's Nott went into partnership with Winder and Wentworth. Winder in this partnership is credited with establishing a “boiling down works”. This was at the beginning of the drought of 1840. See also Boiling down and Boiling Down Works which has the basic idea of being able to preserve meats and extract fats into soaps, etc.

By the 1840s the vineyard at Windermere had been planted and in April 1847 William Wentworth entered samples of various wines in the Hunter River Agricultural Society show in April 1847 (including burgundy wine, sweet water wine, brandy, vinegar).

The Maitland Mercury (12 January 1848) advertised Windermere to let either with or without the mansion.

The properties are likely to have defaulted to Winder (possibly from mortgage default) as on 13 June 1851 the two properties were advertised in the auction sale to be held on 19 June 1851 under the instructions of Tom White Melville Winder.

Peter Green purchased the property in 1854. He resided there until 1868. By 1868, Windermere was described as a “Boiling-down establishment capable of boiling down 900 to 1000 sheep daily.” (Maitland Mercury 4 January 1868).

Charles Solomon Capp purchased the property from Peter Green in 1870.

The Windermere homestead burnt down in 1884 (says 1882) but was rebuilt on top of the original cellars. There was a fire in 1882, which was when a westerly wind blew a spark from the laundry chimney onto the dry shingled roof, and very dry shingled roof, caught fire and left. Only the cellars intact. Per the spark was from the “convict oven” in the old kitchen (wood fired). The family lived in the loft above the brick stables while two wings of the building were reconstructed.

Peter Capp's great grandfather had purchased the property in 1870, died in 1884 at 64 years of age. Peter, his wife, Lorna and their daughters, Annabel and Phillips, were the fourth and fifth generation of the Capp family to live in the house. Family members also lived on properties adjacent to Windermere Homestead. The Newcastle area was closely involved with the family, providing advice on restoration.

In 1940, the Government desired to destroy Windermere house by converting it to a place of entertainment for a military general. A camp was to be sited to the adjacent flood-subjected land, the Capp family fought for the history and to preserve Windermere.

The cellars were also called "the dungeon" by Peter referring to where the convicts were reportedly housed. There were no evidence of shackles or torture, just a description of housing and “servants quarters” under the main house. When Peter Capp owned the house the cellars were converted into a museum. There was a historic bell once used to call workers to meals. Since Peter Capp's death, the homestead has been sold.

== Treatment of convicts ==
Winder's attitude towards the convict workers was one of respect. He was reprimanded by the Governor Macquarie for treating the convict workers under his care “well”.

There is no evidence from the House or from history that the convicts were shackled. Winder felt that by not chaining the convicts while they were working this would contribute to a better job being done. The workers were also given good food allowances including corned meat and a pint of wine each day. Perhaps the idea of the wine was so that they would have a good sleep each night and be refreshed for work the next day.

It was suggested that Winder believed that treating the workers well was reminiscent of how his Father (or uncle possibly?) Wellesley, the Duke of Wellington treated the soldiers in the Napoleonic war, how he felt that looking after the army well was a good investment because then they would also fight well.

It was reported that Winder had 47 convict workers under his care including male and females. This was the largest amount of convict workers assigned to a single person.

== Architecture ==
There does not appear to have been a separate architect. It was suggested that the reason was that in the area at the time was due to the isolated region location and the necessity to place capital into farm developments. The houses constructed were generally functional rather than displays of wealth.

Originally there were many rooms and a cellar. In 1848 (12 January) the Maitland Mercury said there were 14 rooms, a double kitchen, dining room, drawing room, 11 bedrooms, pantry, servants’ sleeping apartments and large cellar. The cellars were sufficient to contain about 3000 gallons of wine (Maitland Mercury 1 July 1849).

When Charles Solomon Capp purchased the property in 1879 (1870 per) “Windermere” was made with sandstone and had 30 rooms plus a double-storey brick stables and a coach house. The cellars on the bottom of the house were large and useful for storing produce from the extensive vineyards.

Reportedly, the bottom story was originally written on the plan as a “double kitchen”. The Newcastle historical society said that the bottom story was for convicts with one of the kitchens providing food for the convicts

In 1882 the mansion was gutted by fire and only two wings were re-built by the Capp family who were living there for four generations.

== Building materials ==
The site was pegged out and trees were planted on the perimeter, so that a carriage could be able to driven around the house and the site cleared.

The original house was built of hand-made sun-baked sand stock bricks. The bricks were made on the premises. The bricks were pegged.

It was made from ridge sand. The only source of lime for mortar was from Newcastle shells which were crushed on site to be mixed in with the sand.

it has a recessed Veranda with a balustrading of cast-iron. All the joinery was fine cedar interiors. The cedar staircase leads down to the original kitchen and various other rooms.

== Building Methods ==
Floor Boards and Timbers

Timbers used in the house were from locally grown trees. Windermere was built in an area rich with cedar timbers. These timbers would be sawn after the trees had been de-barked.

Flooring boards in early houses in the Colony of Australia and in the Hunter region were usually pit sawn. The pits were usually 3 feet wide and 6 feet deep. The “pit sawing” method refers to two people operating a long saw, one in a pit and the one above at ground level. The workers would saw up and down along the piece of timber. The person at the bottom of the pit would be covered in sawdust as dust particles dropped down.

Cedar was generally used for skirting boards and were wide (11 inch to 18 inch i.e. 27-46cm), cedar was even used to contain animals because of its abundance.

Nails were handmade in early years, they may have been manufactured by convict workers.

Bricks

Sanstockbricks were used.

Moulds for the bricks would be made from wood or metal and were slightly larger than the desired brick size (because of shrinkage). Sand would be used on the mould to assist it to come out of the mould later. Mitchell likened it to the greasing or dusting with flour of a cake tin.

First the clay would be dug out by shovels (called 'Winning', or ‘mining the clay’). Clay that is moistened would be tempered by shovel, kneading the mass to make it stick together and prevent cracking. The clay after treatment would be tightly packed and placed in handmade moulds and sunbaked.

== Location history ==
Windermere originally had frontage to the Hunter River.

In 1797 a small coastal ship sailed north from Sydney carrying stores for Upper Hawkesbury settlers. The boat was seized by escaped convicts. Some of the crew joined the convicts and the remnant were put ashore at Pittwater who made their way overland to Port Jackson, reporting the incident to the Governor (Governor Hunter). Hunter sent a well armed rowboat to pursue the Cumberland. The weren't successful in recovering the boat but they did enter a river which he named Hunter's River, discovering Newcastle Harbour a gateway to what is now the Hunter Valley.

Cedar timber trading was facilitated by the location. The original location was located on a cedar forest.

== Building activities timeline ==
Initially, the convict workers cut down the cedar trees, transporting them to ships that Winder owned.

The workers who may have mostly been convict workers would have had their sentences finished by the time of the construction project was completed.
