= Alligator Creek meatworks =

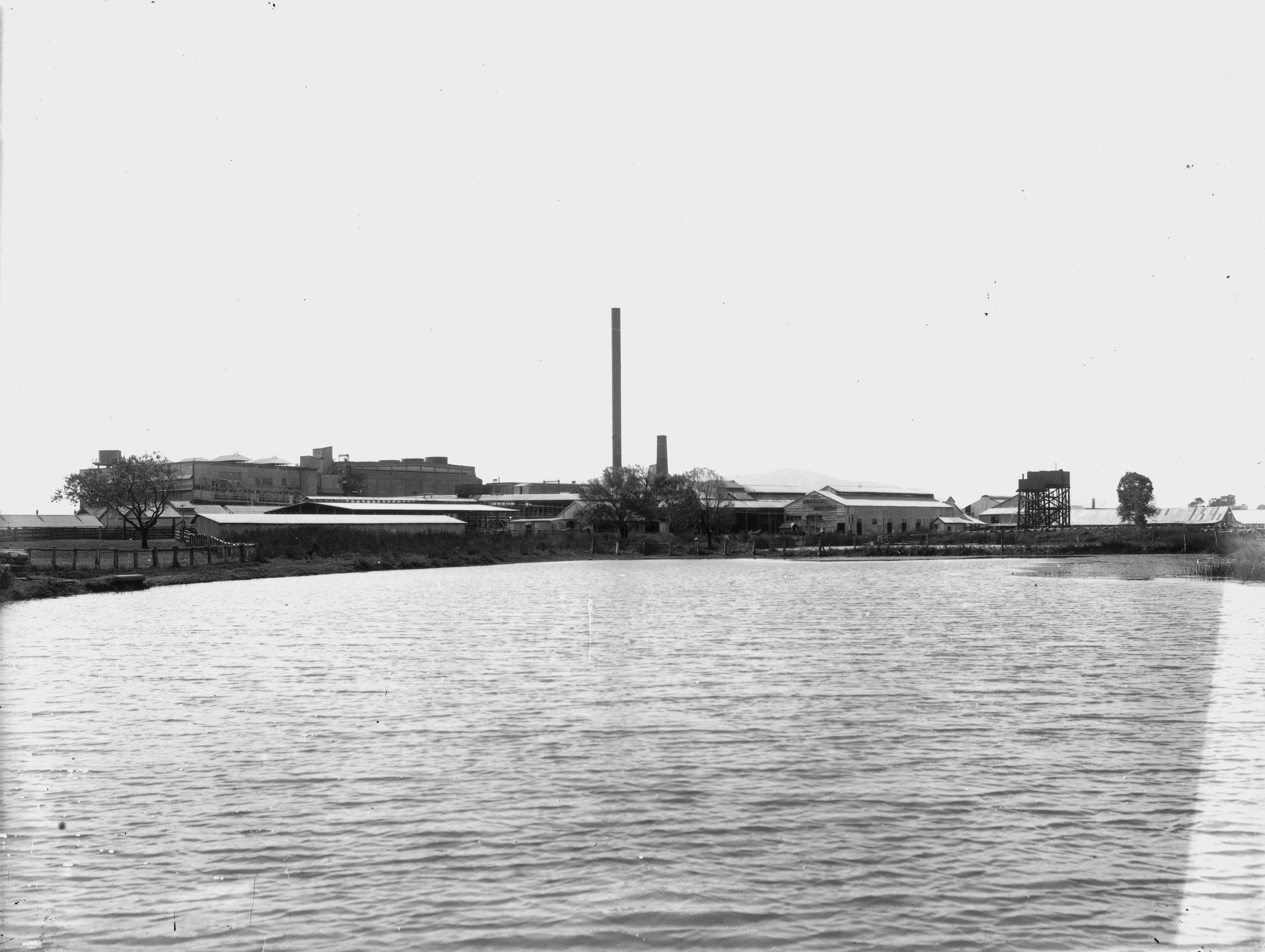
Alligator Creek Meatworks, 1917

Alligator Creek Meatworks is an important historical business in Queensland, Australia. It contributed to processing of food for the growing population by processing meat. Through the introduction of meat exports, it expanded the economy of the local meat and cattle industry and more widely throughout Australia. Early meatworks included boiling down and preserving. Later meatworks used freezer technology and equipment. The meatworks is no longer in operation, but the photos and historical accounts provide an insight into rural life in early Australia and Queensland.

The historical photos and references of the meatworks available and inclusions in early newspapers reports on production for investors and shareholders use highlight the importance of the meatworks industry to the growth of Australia.

The meatworks was earmarked to be in closed in approximately October 1920 because of a shortage of shipping. It continued until 1946 under the management of the Swift Meat Co when it threatened to close because of employee strikes and disputes about leaving work 15 minutes early to catch the train back to the city. It was operational until 1966 when it shifted to Stuart. The plant was dismantled for scrap metal.

See also Ross River Meatworks for more details.

== Location ==
Alligator Creek is a located about 20 km south-east of central Townsville. The meatworks was located at Cleveland Bay in a rural/residential district and no longer in operation.

== History ==
In 1864, a group including Andrew Ball, Mark Reid and two persons of Aboriginal descent set out to find a suitable location for shipping and discovered Alligator Creek for the first time which would later become the site of the meatworks. Andrew Ball may have named the Creek, but it is unknown exactly when and by who. By 1877 industry had come to the area and the first steam drive sawmill in the area was established.

A meatworks site was chosen by William Hann who was a pastoralist and explorer. It was established in 1879. It was started by the Queensland Meat Export Company and restarted in 1889 by the North Queensland Meat Export Company. In peak times there were 1500 workers.

Boiling down works had previously been established in North Queensland but did not last long and closed down, including the Towns & Co. boiling down works at Cleveland Bay which had in 1966 but closed shortly afterwards. Some of the equipment for boiling down was acquired by the North Queensland Meat Export Company for the Alligator Creek meatworks operation.

In 1889, Mr. H. H. Cordingley bought out the meatworks. In 1904 he was listed as being the purchaser of the North Queensland Meat Export and Agency Company's Alligator Creek plant. Cordingley's location was reported in the newspaper to be Patagonia in 1904.

In 1914, Swift Co. Pty Ltd purchased the meatworks and expanded it including the most modern technology. In 1914 while the old establishment continued to operate, a prefabricated meatworks was sent from America to Townsville. More than 1200 workers lived under canvas during construction. There is a historical picture of “Tent town”, 1914–1915, donated by Ron Aitken. The original photo was held by Jack Flowers who had written a note on the back of the picture. He started working at the Alligator Creek meat works when he was 13 years old in 1913 and worked there for 58 years. He would walk from Townsville to Alligator Creek for work.

The main production was for the purposes of preserving meat by boiling down. Canned meat was loading onto trucks for transportation to Townsville where it would be available for general distribution from there. Refrigerated transportation was brought in during 1915. Later modern freezing equipment was installed and preserving meat used freezing technology at the plant, including refrigerated cartage in the 1960s.

The meatworks distribution was important for the economy and was assisted by the government building the Alligator Creek railway station, built in 1915. Later the government upgrades of the Bruce Highway facilitated transportation of the business products. The Highway passed close by to the business.

The meatworks threatened to close in approximately October 1920 because of a shortage of shipping and changes in the economy. In April 1930, the Swift Meat Co. started with a board of 6 later increasing to 12 members operating the Alligator Creek meatworks. In 1930, the government purchased the Swift Meat Co. A record meat pack was recorded in 1942, 5,478,000 cans of preserved meat for the season. The Meatworks was the largest in the area at the time. 62,675 cattle and 23,481 sheep were processed at the factory for the season of 1942 which was more than the Ross River meatworks (42,000 cattle) And the Merinda works at Bowen, (29,000 cattle).

The business continued until 1946 under the management of the Swift Meat Co. when 340 workers threatened to be were laid off because of leaving work early to catch the train which would taken them back to the city. In 1954 there were issues with some people being accused of stealing meat from the meatworks.

== Impact on the environment ==
Effluent from the meatworks including cattle blood was being pumped into the local creek until 1966 having an impact on the local environment including fish stocks and the disappearance of Yankee whitening (Terraglyn) from the creek.

== See also ==
- Ross River
- Ross River Meatworks Chimney
- Merinda meatworks (Bowen)
- Boiling down
