= Ted Lindsay (politician) =

Australian politician (born 1942)

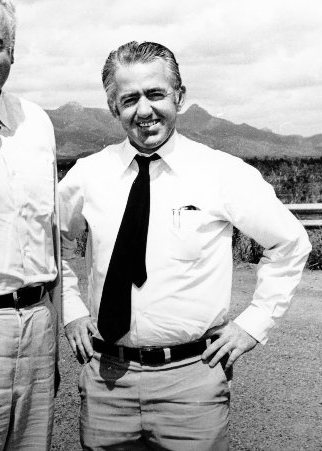
- Lindsay in 1977

Member of the Australian Parliament for Herbert
- In office 5 March 1983 – 2 March 1996
- Preceded by: Gordon Dean
- Succeeded by: Peter Lindsay (no relation)

Personal details
- Born: 19 December 1942 (age 83) Tully, Queensland
- Party: Australian Labor Party
- Occupation: Solicitor

Eamon John "Ted" Lindsay (born 19 December 1942) is a former Australian politician. Born in Tully, Queensland, he was a solicitor and a City of Townsville Councillor before entering federal politics. In 1983, he was elected to the Australian House of Representatives as the Labor member for Herbert, defeating the sitting Liberal member, Gordon Dean. On 24 March 1993 he was appointed Parliamentary Secretary to the Minister for Industry, Technology and Regional Development; on 25 March 1994 this portfolio was renamed Parliamentary Secretary to the Minister for Industry, Science and Technology. Lindsay was defeated in the 1996 election by Liberal candidate Peter Lindsay; the two are not related.

== Early life ==
Lindsay was born on 19 December 1942 in Tully, Queensland. He was a solicitor by profession and served in the Australian Army Legal Corps with the rank of major. He was awarded the Reserve Force Decoration in 1984.

== Politics ==
Lindsay served on the Townsville City Council from 1976 to 1983. He was elected to the House of Representatives at the 1983 federal election, winning the seat of Herbert for the ALP from the incumbent Liberal MP Gordon Dean. He had previously contested the seat against Dean at the 1977 and 1980 elections, narrowing the margin on each occasion.

In parliament, Lindsay served as chair of the Joint Statutory Committee on the National Crime Authority from 1990 to 1993 and was active on a number of other committees. He was appointed as a parliamentary secretary in the Keating government following the 1993 election, serving under ministers Alan Griffiths in the Department of Industry, Technology and Regional Development and Peter Cook in the Department of Industry, Science and Technology.

Parliament of Australia
Preceded by Gordon Dean	Member for Herbert; 1983–1996	Succeeded by Peter Lindsay
