= Sandy Hollway =

Australian public servant

Sandy Hollway AO

Secretary of the Department of Industry, Technology and Regional Development
- In office 20 December 1993 – 25 March 1994

Secretary of the Department of Industry, Science and Technology
- In office 25 March 1994 – 11 March 1996

Secretary of the Department of Employment, Education, Training and Youth Affairs
- In office 11 March 1996 – 29 December 1996

Personal details
- Born: David Alexander Hollway
- Education: University of Sydney
- Occupation: Public servant

David Alexander Hollway AO is a former senior Australian public servant and policymaker. He retired from the Australian Public Service in 1996 to head the 2000 Summer Olympics.

== Background and career ==
Hollway graduated from the University of Sydney in 1968, with first-class honours in philosophy. He started his Australian Public Service career in the Department of External Affairs in 1969.

Between 1988 and 1990, Hollway was Chief of Staff for Prime Minister Bob Hawke.

In 1993, Hollway was appointed Secretary of the Department of Industry, Technology and Regional Development (later the Department of Industry, Science and Technology). At the beginning of 1996, Hollway shifted to become Secretary of the Department of Employment, Education, Training and Youth Affairs, staying in the role less than a year.

Hollway left his Secretary position at the end of 1996, to take up employment as Chief Executive Officer of the Sydney Organising Committee for the Olympic Games. Prior to the games, Hollway was embroiled in controversy as an inquiry was launched in the Olympic's ticketing fiasco after it was revealed most of the best tickets were not available to Australian sports fans, instead being put aside for sales at triple the face value to businesses.

Hollway has served as a member of boards for a number of Australian Government organisations including CSIRO, ANSTO and Austrade.

In 2008, Hollway provided support to Beijing Olympic Games organisers, one of only a few foreigners called upon to advise Chinese authorities. Also that year, in March, he was appointed by then Prime Minister Kevin Rudd to act as chief mediator between Canberra and Port Moresby over the future of the Kokoda Trail.

In October 2008 he was appointed to be Australia's first Special Envoy on Whale Conservation, to try to persuade Japan to curtail its Antarctic whaling. In the role, Hollway presented Australia's case at meetings with representatives of both like-minded and pro-whaling nations. Critics drew attention to his lack of success and high cost to taxpayers.

In 2010, Hollway was appointed Chair of the Independent review of aid effectiveness panel, undertaking a review of Australia's aid program, administered by AusAID. The review, released in July 2011, found that the Australian aid program in 2011 was an effective performer by global donor standards.

At January 2014, Hollway was working as a Consultant at TFG International.

== Awards ==
Hollway was made an Officer of the Order of Australia in January 2002 for service to public administration, particularly as a senior adviser to government, to sport through the Sydney Organising Committee for the Olympic Games, and to the community.

Government offices
| Preceded by Neville Stevens | Secretary of the Department of Industry, Technology and Regional Development; 1993 – 1994 | Succeeded by Himself as Secretary of the Department of Industry, Science and Technology |
| Preceded by Neville Stevens | Secretary of the Department of Industry, Technology and Regional Development; 1993 – 1994 | Succeeded by Andrew Podger as Secretary of the Department of Housing and Regional Development |
| Preceded by Himself as Secretary of the Department of Industry, Technology and Regional Development | Secretary of the Department of Industry, Science and Technology; 1994 - 1996 | Succeeded by Greg Taylor as Secretary of the Department of Industry, Science and Tourism |
| Preceded by Derek Volker as Secretary of the Department of Employment, Education and Training | Secretary of the Department of Employment, Education, Training and Youth Affairs; 1996 | Succeeded by Steve Sedgwick |
