= Oonoonba, Queensland =

Oonoonba
- Suburb
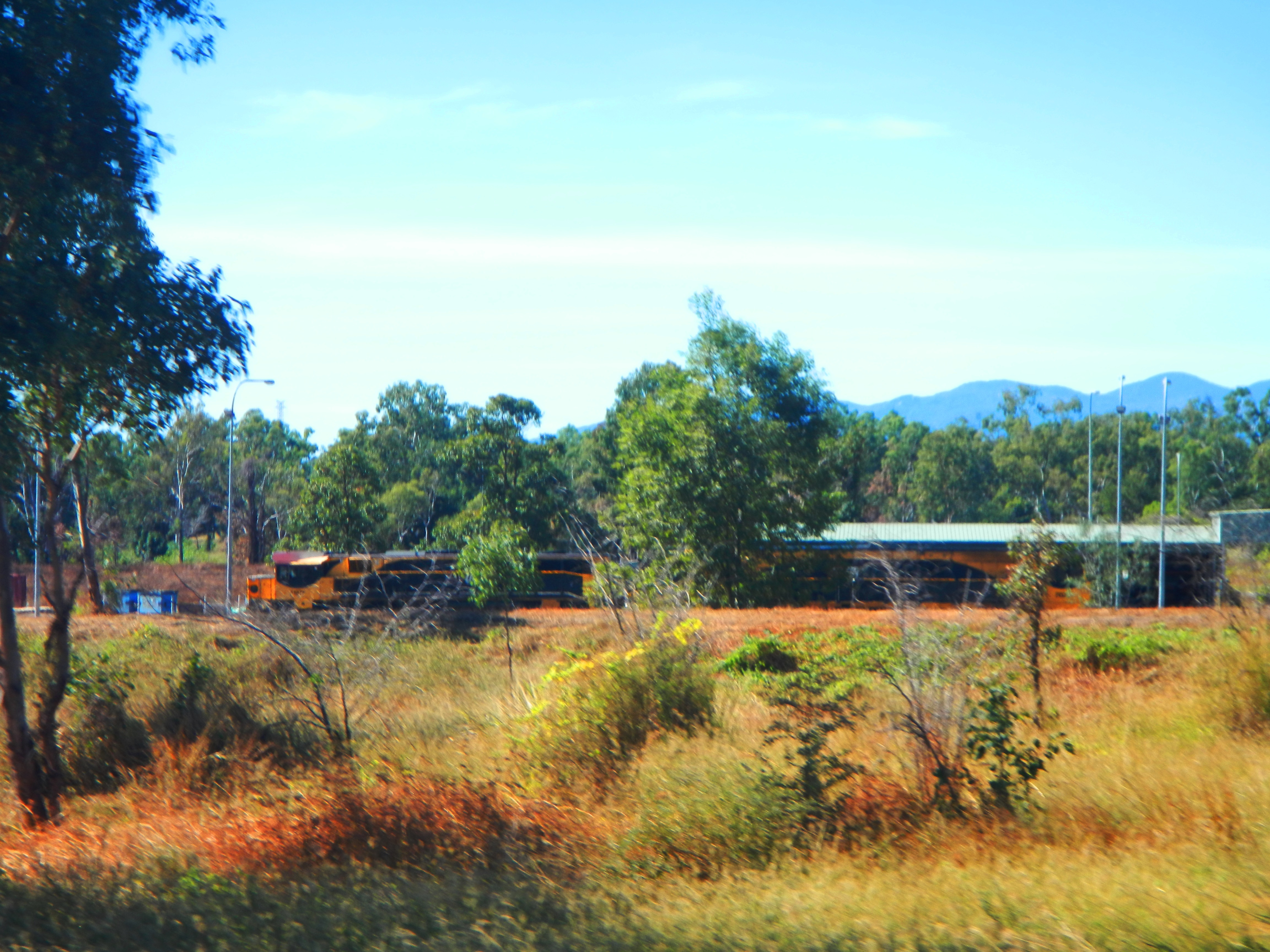
- Train waiting at a siding in Oonoonba, 2016

- Interactive map of Oonoonba
- Coordinates: 19.2983°S 146.8188°E
- Country: Australia
- State: Queensland
- City: Townsville
- LGA: City of Townsville
- Location: 5.8 km (3.6 mi) S of Townsville CBD; 1,327 km (825 mi) NNW of Brisbane

Government
  - State electorate: Mundingburra
  - Federal division: Dawson

Area
  - Total: 2.5 km^{2} (0.97 sq mi)

Population
  - Total: 2,050 (2021 census)
  - Density: 820/km^{2} (2,120/sq mi)
- Time zone: UTC+10:00 (AEST)
- Postcode: 4811
Suburbs around Oonoonba
Hermit Park	Railway Estate	Railway Estate
Rosslea	Oonoonba	Stuart
Idalia	Cluden	Stuart

Oonoonba is a suburb of Townsville in the City of Townsville, Queensland, Australia. In the 2021 census, Oonoonba had a population of 2,050 people.

== Geography ==
Oonoonba is approximately 5.8 kilometres (3.6 mi) by road south from Townsville central business district.

The suburb is bounded to the north by the Ross River, to the east loosely by Gordon Creek, to the south by the North Coast railway line and to the west loosely by Northshore Circuit.

The suburb is predominantly a residential area. Oonoonba was once considered isolated from Townsville, but subdivision development at neighbouring Idalia has filled the void between and has made Oonoonba become part of the contiguous urban area of Townsville.

The areas in the north and east of the suburb along the river are not used as they are marshland.

The North Coast railway line passes through the suburb from south (Idalia/Cluden) to north, crossing the Ross River to Railway Estate (19.3003°S 146.8181°E). The suburb is served by the Oonoonba railway station (19.3003°S 146.8181°E) but there is no infrastructure at the station any more.

South Townsville Road (Abbot Street) runs through the suburb from south (Idalia/Cluden where it connects to the Bruce Highway), running parallel and to the immediate east of the railway line, exiting the suburb as it crosses the Ross River on Rooneys Bridge to Railway Estate. There are three bridge crossings at this point from west to east: the rail bridge, a pedestrian/cycle bridge, and the road bridge.

== History ==
The suburb takes its name from its railway station name, which in turn was named in 1880 using an Aboriginal word meaning water or wet ground.

Oonoonba State School opened on 15 November 1920. The "old school" was later bulldozed for the new road creating the "new school" the school was opened in 2002 and is still open today.

== Demographics ==
In the 2016 census, Oonoonba had a population of 1,675 people.

In the 2021 census, Oonoonba had a population of 2,050 people.

== Education ==
There are no schools within the suburb. The nearest government primary school is Oonoonba State School, which is within the boundaries of the neighbouring suburb of Idalia. The nearest government secondary schools are Townsville State High School to the north in Railway Estate and William Ross State High School in Annandale.
