= Department of Industry, Technology and Regional Development =

Australian government department, 1993–1994

Department overview
- Formed: 24 March 1993
- Preceding Department: Department of Industry, Technology and Commerce – for all functions Department of Immigration, Local Government and Ethnic Affairs – for regional development function
- Dissolved: 25 March 1994
- Superseding Department: Department of Housing and Regional Development - for regional development function Department of Industry, Science and Technology – for all other functions
- Jurisdiction: Commonwealth of Australia
- Headquarters: Canberra
- Ministers responsible: Alan Griffiths, Minister (1993–1994); Peter Cook, Minister (1994); Ted Lindsay, Parliamentary Secretary (1993–1994)
- Department executives: Neville Stevens, Secretary (1993); Sandy Hollway, Secretary (1993–1994)

The Department of Industry, Technology and Regional Development was an Australian government department that existed between March 1993 and March 1994.

== Scope ==
Information about the department's functions and government funding allocation could be found in the Administrative Arrangements Orders, the annual Portfolio Budget Statements and in the Department's annual reports.

According to the Administrative Arrangements Order made on 24 March 1993, the Department dealt with:

- Manufacturing and commerce including industries development
- Science and technology, including industrial research and development
- Export services
- Marketing, including export promotion, of manufactures and services
- Small business
- Construction industry (excluding residential construction)
- Duties of customs and excise
- Bounties on the production of goods
- Offsets, to the extent not dealt with by the Department of Defence
- Patents of inventions and designs, and trade marks
- Weights and measures
- Civil space program
- Commission for the Future
- Regional development

== Structure ==
The Department was an Australian Public Service department, staffed by officials who were responsible to the Minister for Industry, Technology and Regional Development. The Ministers were Alan Griffiths (until 23 January 1994) and then Peter Cook (from 30 January 1994). The Ministers were assisted in the role by a Parliamentary Secretary, Ted Lindsay.

From 24 March 1993 to 19 December 1993, the Secretary of the Department was Neville Stevens; from 20 December 1993 to 25 March 1994, the Secretary was Sandy Hollway.
