= Ewen Jones =

Australian politician (1960–2023)

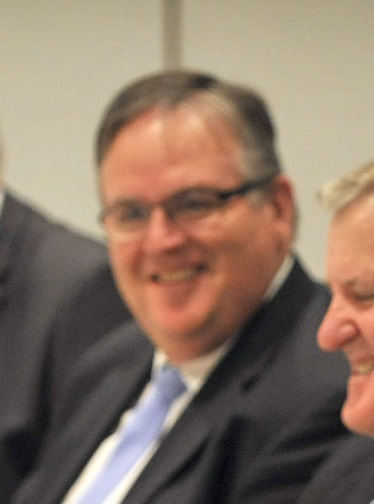
- Jones in 2014

Member of the Australian Parliament for Herbert
- In office 21 August 2010 – 2 July 2016
- Preceded by: Peter Lindsay
- Succeeded by: Cathy O'Toole

Personal details
- Born: 7 March 1960 Quilpie, Queensland, Australia
- Died: 13 July 2023 (aged 63)
- Party: Liberal National Party
- Website: http://www.ewenjones.com.au

Ewen Thomas Jones (7 March 1960 – 13 July 2023) was an Australian politician representing the division of Herbert for the Liberal National Party from the 2010 federal election until the 2016 federal election.

Jones won the division of Herbert in 2010, achieving a 2.05% swing against the Labor candidate, former mayor of Townsville, Tony Mooney. Jones was a longtime resident of Townsville, Queensland. He was Liberal Whip from 12 October 2015 until 9 May 2016.

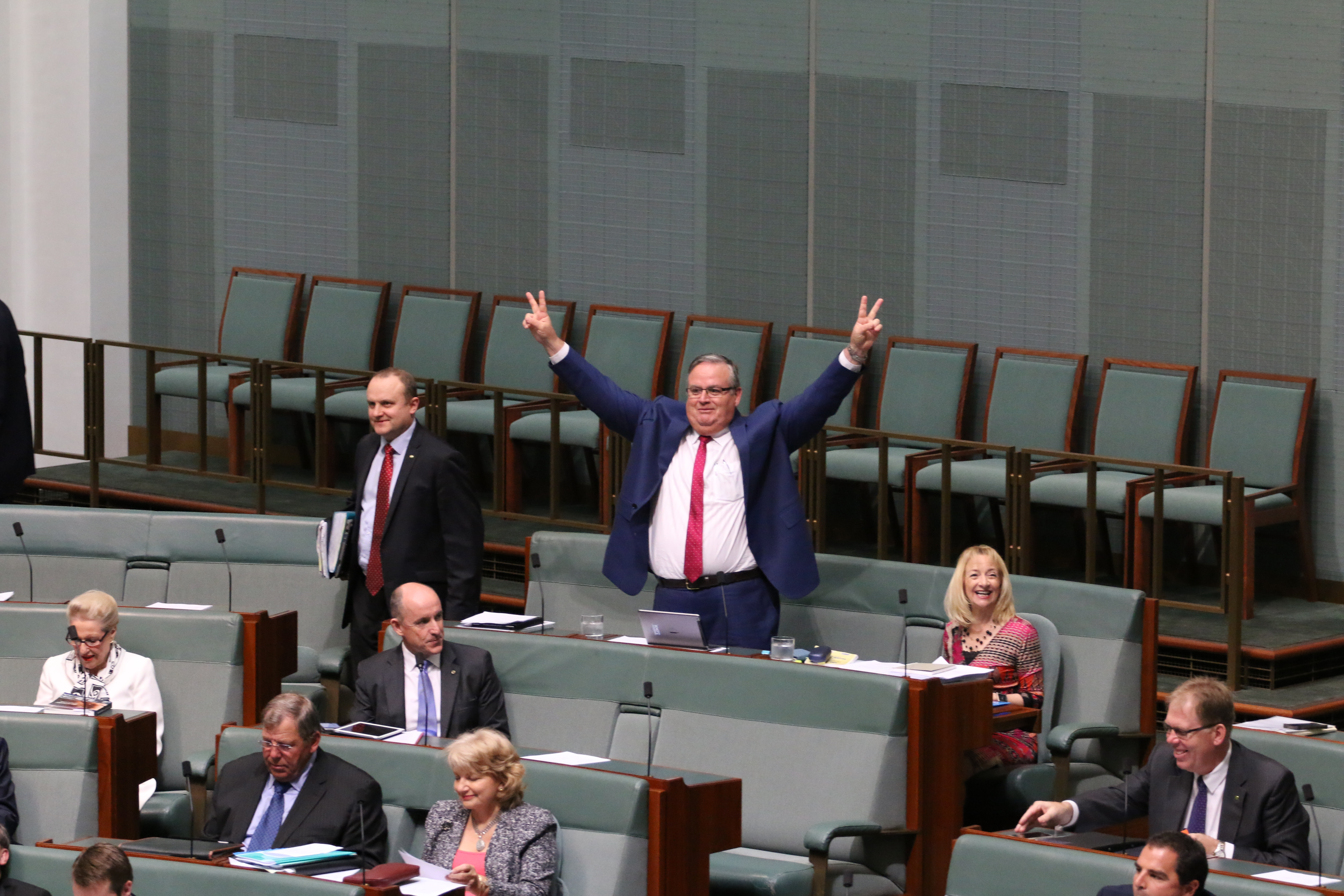
Jones in Parliament, 2016

On 18 July 2016, at the conclusion of vote counting for the 2016 election, Labor's Cathy O'Toole appeared to have defeated Jones by eight votes, triggering an automatic recount. The recount and subsequent distribution of preferences gave O'Toole a margin of 37 votes. It represented the first time that Labor had won Herbert since the 1993 federal election.

Jones died of cancer on 13 July 2023, at the age of 63.

Parliament of Australia
| Preceded by Peter Lindsay | Member for Herbert; 2010–2016 | Succeeded by Cathy O'Toole |
