= Phillip Thompson =

Australian politician

Phillip Thompson OAM MP
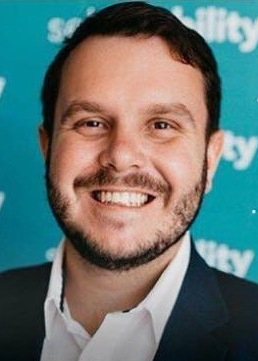

Member of the Australian Parliament for Herbert
- Incumbent
- Assumed office 18 May 2019
- Preceded by: Cathy O'Toole

Personal details
- Born: 7 May 1988 (age 38) Armidale, New South Wales, Australia
- Party: Liberal (federal)
- Other political affiliations: Liberal National (state)
- Awards: 2018 Queensland Young Australian of the Year; Medal of the Order of Australia
- Website: philthompson.com.au

Military service
- Allegiance: Australia
- Branch/service: Australian Army
- Years of service: 2006–2012
- Unit: 1st Battalion, Royal Australian Regiment
- Battles/wars: Operation Astute; War in Afghanistan

Phillip Bruce Thompson (born 7 May 1988) is an Australian politician. A member of the Liberal National Party of Queensland, he sits with the Liberal Party in federal parliament.

Thompson is a member of the House of Representatives, representing the Division of Herbert. He was first elected in the 2019 Australian federal election.

Prior to entering politics, Thompson was Queensland Young Australian of the Year.

== Early life and education ==
Thompson was born in Armidale, New South Wales. In 2006, at age seventeen, Thompson enlisted in the Australian Army. He underwent training at Kapooka and Singleton before being posted to the 1st Battalion, Royal Australian Regiment, in Townsville. In 2007 Thompson was deployed to East Timor.

In May 2009, Thompson was deployed to Afghanistan. Six months into this deployment, while conducting a dismounted patrol, an IED exploded a metre in front of him. He spent several years recovering from physical and mental injuries caused by the incident. The injuries at the time significantly affected his memory, hearing, and contributed to subsequent mental health challenges.

In 2014, Thompson represented Australia at the inaugural Invictus Games held in London; a sporting competition for wounded, injured, or ill participants in the armed forces. In 2016, he coached the Powerlifting and wheelchair rugby teams at the event held in Orlando, Florida. He was awarded a Medal of the Order of Australia in the 2018 Queen's Birthday Honours for service to the welfare of veterans.

During the 2019 campaign, Thompson apologised to the Australian Muslims after directing violent threats towards Muslims on Facebook in 2012, which he claimed were caused by post-traumatic stress disorder from his military service. He commented "I know what im (sic) doing this week getting my gun licence" and "give me a M4 and send to Sydney and I'll do the dishes (sic)", in reference to Muslim protesters.

== Political career ==
Thompson entered politics upon being elected for the Division of Herbert at the 2019 federal election. He was the youngest member of the lower house in the 46th Parliament.

In Thompson's first speech he stated that the well-being of Indigenous Australians and the defence community are among his priorities as an MP. He acknowledged his mother in law, his wife, and daughter as Aboriginal women and stated that "we must not forget there is still a lot of work to be done in recognising and valuing our First Nations people and their culture."

Speaking of the defence community, Thompson acknowledged "the ultimate sacrifice on operations in service to this nation and our many veterans who have succumbed to their war within back here on home soil".

Thompson served on the "Inquiry into the destruction of 46,000 year old caves at the Juukan Gorge in the Pilbara region of Western Australia", which delivered its interim report in December 2020.

During the Morrison government, Thompson was a member of the National Right faction of the Liberal Party.

In February 2026, Thompson resigned from the Liberal frontbench and helped initiate a leadership spill against party leader Sussan Ley, backing Angus Taylor's bid for the party leadership. Following Ley's resignation, under the Taylor shadow ministry, Thompson was appointed as the Shadow Minister for Defence Industry and the Shadow Minister for Defence Personnel.

On 25 May 2026, Thompson was suspended from the House of Representatives for 24 hour after refusing to comply with an order to withdraw a statement accusing the Australian Labor Party of lying.

== Personal life ==
Thompson is married to Jenna, and has two daughters named Astin and Emery. On 11 December 2025, Thompson announced via Facebook that he had separated from his wife.

Parliament of Australia
Preceded by Cathy O'Toole	Member for Herbert; 2019–present	Incumbent
