= George Martens =

Australian politician

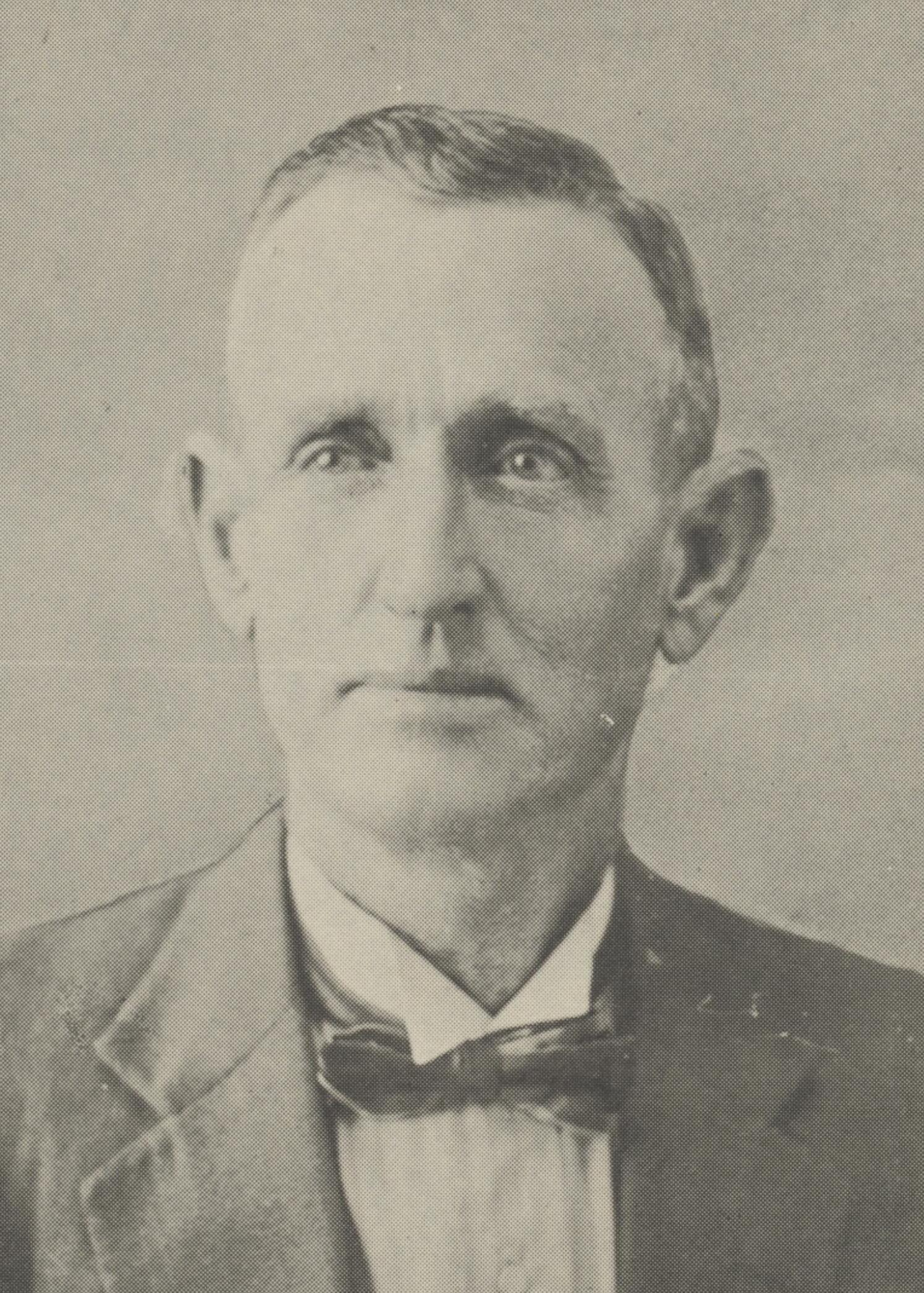
- Martens c. 1928

Member of the Australian Parliament for Herbert
- In office 17 November 1928 – 16 August 1946
- Preceded by: Lewis Nott
- Succeeded by: Bill Edmonds

Personal details
- Born: 9 September 1872 Mount Perry, Colony of Queensland
- Died: 23 August 1949 (aged 76) Sydney, New South Wales, Australia
- Party: Labor
- Occupation: Unionist

George William Martens (9 September 1872 – 23 August 1949) was an Australian politician. He was an Australian Labor Party member of the Australian House of Representatives from 1928 to 1946, representing the electorate of Herbert.

== Early life ==
Martens was born on 9 September 1872 in Mount Perry, Queensland. He attended state schools at Mount Perry and Gayndah, leaving school at a young age to enter the workforce. According to a 1922 article in the Daily Standard, he worked for periods as a stockman, drover, fencer and "general bush worker". He returned to Mount Perry in 1899 to work in the copper smelter and later farmed in the Burnett River district for two years.

Martens also worked at the Pleystowe Sugar Mill west of Mackay for a period, where two of his co-workers were future Prime Minister Arthur Fadden and Queensland state politician Maurice Hynes.

== Politics ==
Martens was active in the trade union movement, notably the Sugar Workers Union, and was an organiser with the Australian Workers' Union, of which he eventually became Queensland secretary. In 1928, he was elected to the Australian House of Representatives as the Labor member for Herbert, defeating the sitting Nationalist Lewis Nott. He held the seat until 1946, when he retired from politics.

During World War II, Martens opposed moves towards mass internment of enemy aliens, with his electorate including a significant Italian-Australian population. He made personal representations on behalf of internees to army minister Frank Forde and attorney-general H. V. Evatt. In 1942 he wrote to Prime Minister John Curtin that he was "astounded to see what was taking place in regard to internments" in North Queensland, citing examples of Italian internees who were naturalised citizens, had lived in Australia since childhood, were members of the Volunteer Defence Corps, or had sons serving in the Australian military.

== Later life ==
After retiring from politics, Martens become director of Commonwealth Oil Refineries. Martens died on 23 August 1949 in Sydney, New South Wales. His death bed request was that there would be no newspaper nor radio announcements of his death and that he should be cremated quietly and privately.

== Sources ==
- Arklay, T.M. (2016) Arthur Fadden: A Political Silhouette, Australian Scholarly Publishing: North Melbourne. ISBN 978 1 925003 84 0.

Parliament of Australia
Preceded by Lewis Nott	Member for Herbert; 1928–1946	Succeeded by Bill Edmonds
