= Department of Industry, Science and Technology =

Australian government department, 1994–1996

Department overview
- Formed: 25 March 1994
- Preceding Department: Department of Industry, Technology and Regional Development
- Dissolved: 11 March 1996
- Superseding Department: Department of Industry, Science and Tourism
- Jurisdiction: Commonwealth of Australia
- Headquarters: Canberra
- Minister responsible: Peter Cook, Minister for Industry, Science and Technology
- Department executive: Sandy Hollway, Secretary

The Department of Industry, Science and Technology (also called DIST) was an Australian government department that existed between March 1994 and March 1996.

== Scope ==
Information about the department's functions and government funding allocation could be found in the Administrative Arrangements Orders, the annual Portfolio Budget Statements and in the Department's annual reports.

At its creation, the Department was responsible for the following:

- Manufacturing and commerce including industries development
- Science and technology, including industrial research and development
- Export services
- Marketing, including export promotion, of manufactures and services
- Small business
- Construction industry (excluding residential construction)
- Duties of customs and excise
- Bounties on the production of goods
- Offsets, to the extent not dealt with by the Department of Defence
- Patents of inventions and designs, and trade marks
- Weights and measures
- Civil space program
- Commission for the Future

== Structure ==
The Department was an Australian Public Service department, staffed by officials who were responsible to the Minister for Industry, Science and Technology, Peter Cook.
