= Cathy O'Toole =

Australian politician

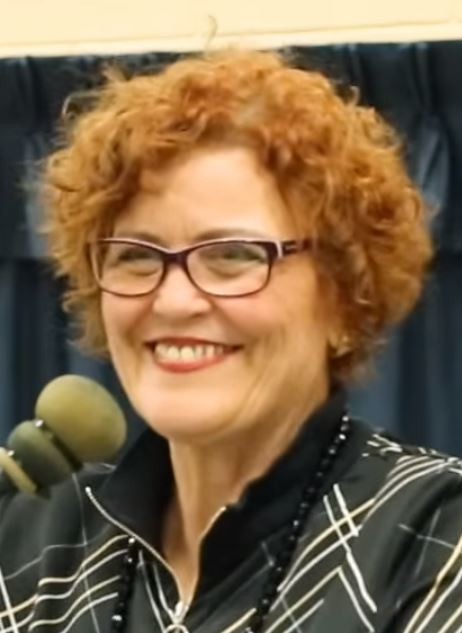
- O'Toole in 2017

Member of the Australian Parliament for Herbert
- In office 2 July 2016 – 18 May 2019
- Preceded by: Ewen Jones
- Succeeded by: Phillip Thompson

Personal details
- Born: 30 August 1956 (age 70) Townsville, Queensland, Australia
- Party: Labor Party
- Children: 3
- Education: Central Queensland University
- Occupation: CEO
- Website: http://cathyotoole.org.au

Catherine Elizabeth O'Toole (born 30 August 1956) is an Australian former politician. She served as the Labor member for Herbert from 2016 until 2019.

== Early life and career ==
O'Toole was born and raised in Townsville, Queensland.

O'Toole left school in year 11, when she was 16 years old, to become an apprentice hairdresser. When she was 18 she and her mother purchased and ran the business. O'Toole and her husband Dennis later bought out her mother's stake in the business, and ran local family-owned small businesses including hairdressers, a news agency, and vocational training organisation.

From 1988 to 2002, O'Toole was involved in vocational training organisations: from 1988 to 1991, O'Toole was a teacher at Townsville College of TAFE and Kangaroo College of TAFE, and from 1991 to 1993 was Program Manager of Curriculum Design at Townsville TAFE; O'Toole was an Associate at the Tropical Industry Training Associates from 1994 to 1995, then from 1996 to 1997 was Manager; In 1996, she was owner and Director of O'Toole Enterprises; and, from 1997 to 2000, was managing director and owner of Future Skills & Training.

From 2002 to 2016, O'Toole was involved in the community mental health sector: In 2002–2011, O'Toole was CEO of Advance Employment, which provided disability employment services; From 2012 to 2013, O'Toole was Project Development Manager of Supported Options in Lifestyle and Access Services (SOLAS) before becoming CEO from 2013 to 2016. In 2015 O'Toole was President of the Queensland Alliance for Mental Health.

In 2008, O'Toole received a Rotary Sunflower Award for Community Work.

O'Toole has a Bachelor of Education from CQUniversity.

O'Toole is married to Dennis, and they have three adult children.

O'Toole is a member of Amnesty International. In February 2016 she was part of a protest, about the treatment of refugees, outside the office of the sitting Liberal National Party MP Ewen Jones.

== Political career ==
O'Toole was the unsuccessful Labor candidate for Herbert at the 2013 federal election. Last won by Labor at the 1993 federal election, Herbert was won by O'Toole in 2016, appearing to win the seat by eight votes. A recount revealed she won by 37 votes.

She lost her seat at the 2019 federal election.

Parliament of Australia
Preceded by Ewen Jones	Member for Herbert; 2016–2019	Succeeded by Phillip Thompson
