= Bill Edmonds =

Australian politician

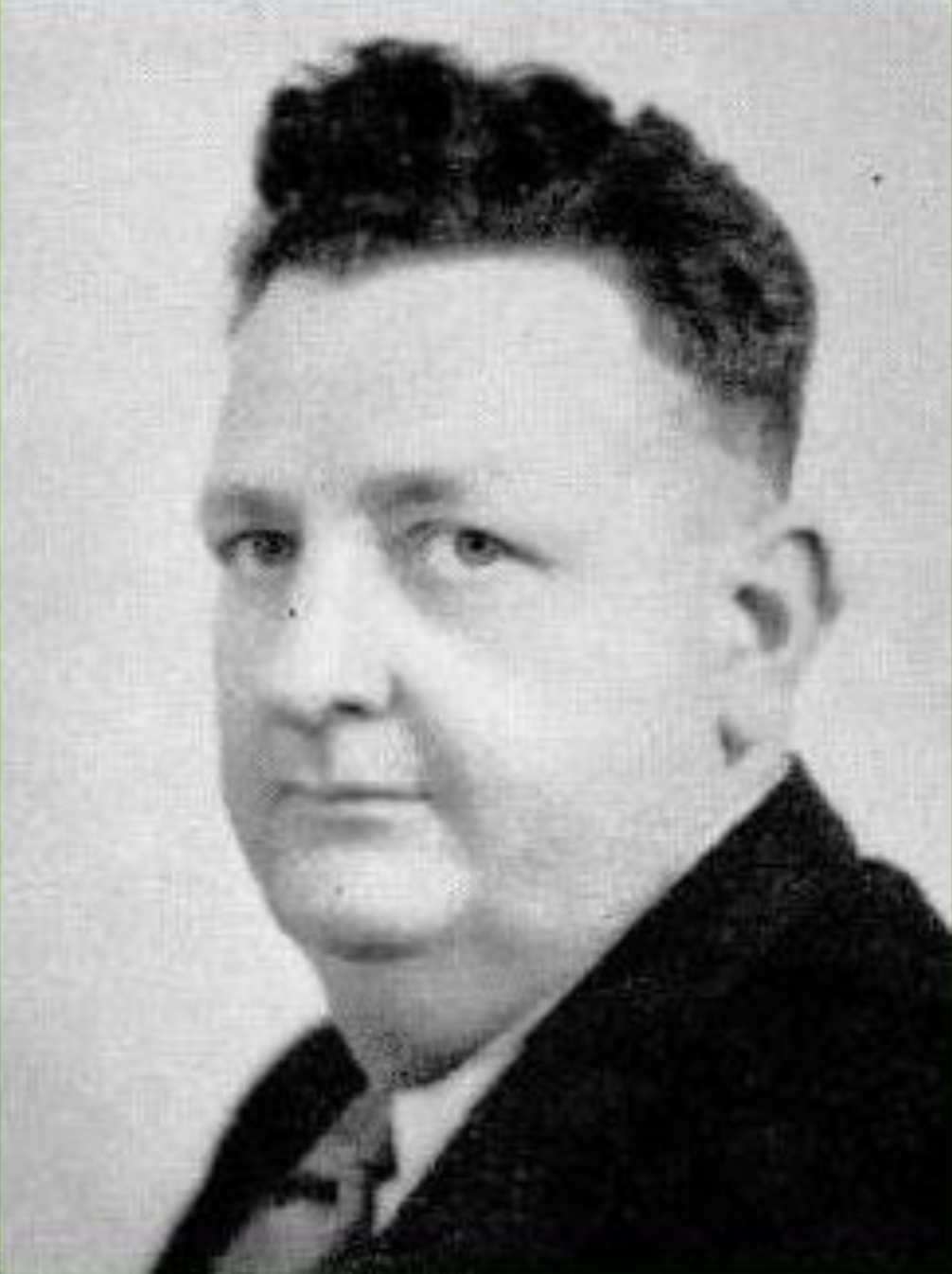

Member of the Australian Parliament for Herbert
- In office 28 September 1946 – 22 November 1958
- Preceded by: George Martens
- Succeeded by: John Murray

Personal details
- Born: William Frederick Edmonds; 23 October 1903 Charters Towers, Queensland
- Died: 24 November 1968 (aged 65)
- Party: Australian Labor Party
- Occupation: Miner, unionist

William Frederick Edmonds (23 October 1903 – 24 November 1968) was an Australian politician and trade unionist from Queensland. He served briefly as state president of Australian Workers' Union (AWU) before his election to the House of Representatives at the 1946 federal election. He represented the Australian Labor Party (ALP) in the seat of Herbert until his defeat in 1958.

== Early life ==
Edmonds was born in Charters Towers, Queensland, but lived in Western Queensland from the age of nine. He worked in the copper mines of Kuridala, Mount Elliott and Mount Cuthbert, and later on the construction of the railway between Dajarra and Camooweal. In 1921, Edmonds moved to the coast, where he worked variously as a storeman, truck driver, railway worker, grocer, builder's labourer, and sugar worker.

== Union career ==
In 1939, Edmonds began working as an organiser for the Australian Workers' Union (AWU), based in Townsville. He was elected secretary of the union's northern district in June 1943, and in January 1945 was elected state president.

== Politics ==
Edmonds was elected to the House of Representatives at the 1946 federal election. He had earlier defeated the sitting member, George Martens, for ALP preselection. In his maiden speech he "launched a bitter attack on the Australian Communist Party".

In 1949, Edmonds proposed abolishing the Stevedoring Industry Commission and returning control of maritime industrial relations to the Commonwealth Court of Conciliation and Arbitration.

After the 1954 election, Edmonds was the Labor Party's candidate for Speaker of the House of Representatives, losing by nine votes to the incumbent Liberal speaker Archie Cameron. He lost his seat at the 1958 election to John Murray, who had the endorsement of both the Liberal Party and Country Party but sat as a Liberal in parliament.

== Personal life ==
Edmonds had twin sons with his wife Evelyn. He was widowed in September 1945.

Parliament of Australia
Preceded by George Martens	Member for Herbert; 1946–1958	Succeeded by John Murray
