= Robert Bonnett =

Australian politician (1916–1994)

Robert Bonnett OBE
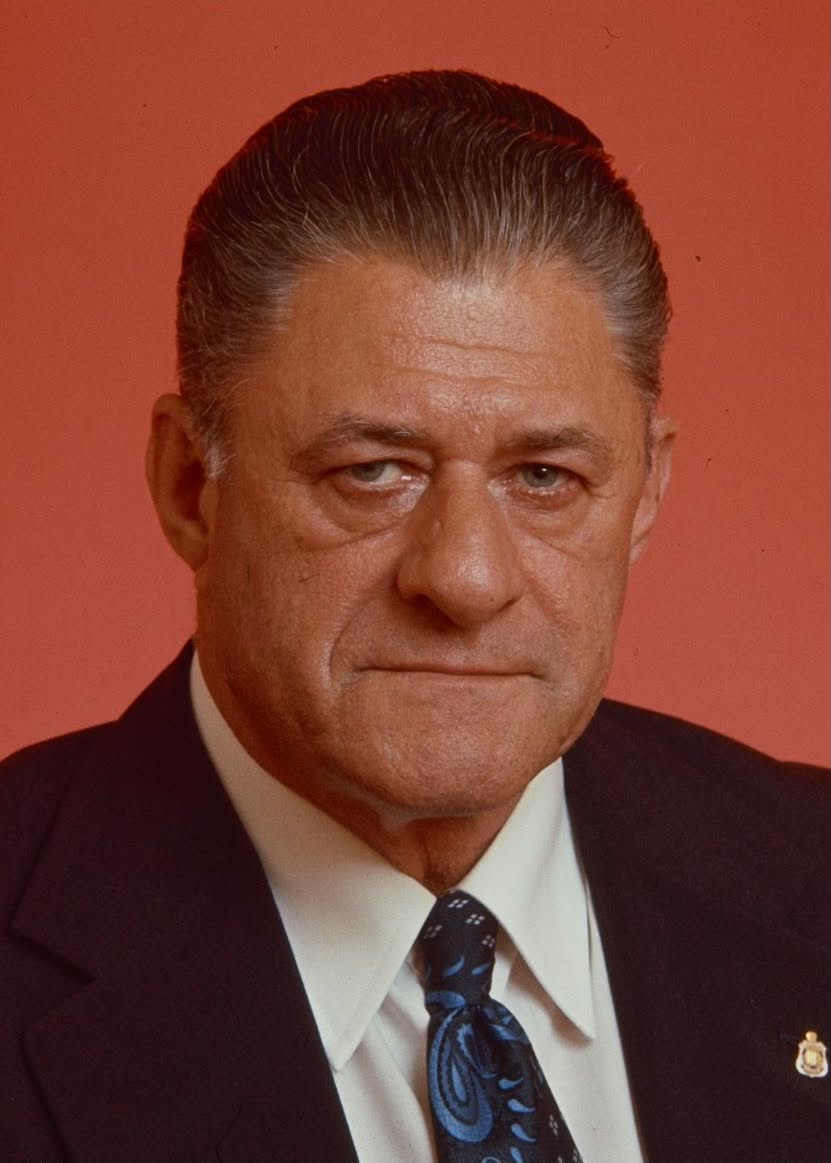

Member of the Australian Parliament for Herbert
- In office 26 November 1966 – 10 November 1977
- Preceded by: Ted Harding
- Succeeded by: Gordon Dean

Personal details
- Born: 1 September 1916 Brisbane, Queensland
- Died: 21 April 1994 (aged 77)
- Party: Liberal Party of Australia
- Occupation: Sales manager

Robert Noel "Duke" Bonnett, OBE (1 September 1916 – 21 April 1994) was an Australian politician. Born in Brisbane, he was educated at state schools before becoming a sales manager at Townsville. He served in the military 1941–45. In 1966, he was elected to the Australian House of Representatives as the Liberal member for Herbert, defeating sitting Labor MP Ted Harding. He held the seat until his retirement in 1977. Bonnett died in 1994.

Parliament of Australia
Preceded by Ted Harding	Member for Herbert; 1966–1977	Succeeded by Gordon Dean
