= Ted Harding =

Australian politician

Ernest Harding
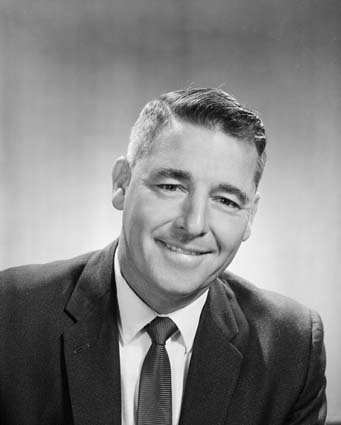

Member of the Australian Parliament for Herbert
- In office 9 December 1961 – 26 November 1966
- Preceded by: John Murray
- Succeeded by: Robert Bonnett

Personal details
- Born: 12 June 1921 Bowen, Queensland
- Died: 3 February 2004 (aged 82)
- Party: Australian Labor Party
- Education: Townsville Grammar School
- Occupation: Furniture retailer
- Profession: Developer

Ernest William Harding (12 June 1921 – 3 February 2004) was an Australian politician. Born in Bowen, Queensland, he was educated at Townsville Grammar School before serving in the military 1942–44. On his return he became a furniture retailer.

In 1961, Harding was elected to the Australian House of Representatives as the Labor member for Herbert, defeating Liberal MP John Murray. He held the seat until his defeat in 1966, after which he became a company director. Harding died in 2004.

Parliament of Australia
Preceded by John Murray	Member for Herbert; 1961–1966	Succeeded by Robert Bonnett
