= Gordon Dean (Australian politician) =

Australian politician (1942–2023)

Member of the Australian Parliament for Herbert
- In office 10 December 1977 – 5 March 1983
- Preceded by: Robert Bonnett
- Succeeded by: Ted Lindsay

Personal details
- Born: 13 June 1942 Mackay, Queensland, Australia
- Died: 27 July 2023 (aged 81)
- Party: Liberal Party of Australia
- Occupation: Solicitor

Arthur Gordon Dean (13 June 1942 – 27 July 2023) was an Australian politician, solicitor and magistrate. He was a Liberal Party of Australia member of the Australian House of Representatives from 1977 to 1983, representing the electorate of Herbert.

== Early life ==
Dean was born in Mackay, Queensland, raised in the small town of Maroon and educated in Mount Isa and Townsville. In 1960, he began as an articled clerk for his grandfather's Townsville law firm of Dean Gillman & Thompson, was admitted as a solicitor in 1965, and became a partner of the firm the same year, remaining with them until his election to parliament.

Dean also worked as a television newsreader for the Australian Broadcasting Corporation in Townsville from 1964 to 1967. He was involved with James Cook University as the honorary solicitor for the student union (1966–87), chairman of the student union council (1969–72) and a member of the university council (1970–73), and held other community roles as president of the Eisteddfod Council of North Queensland and a board member for the Townsville Hospitals Board and the John Flynn College.

== Political career ==
Dean was elected to the House of Representatives at the 1977 federal election as the Liberal member for the marginal seat of Herbert. He was re-elected in 1980, but fearing electoral defeat, backed a failed effort in 1982 to oust Prime Minister Malcolm Fraser and replace him with rival Andrew Peacock. He was nonetheless defeated at the 1983 federal election by the Labor candidate Ted Lindsay.

=== Later career ===
Dean returned to legal practice after his 1983 defeat, becoming a partner in the Townsville firm of Nehmer Davenport Dean. He moved to Brisbane for family reasons in 1987, working as an associate for James Byrne & Associates and then Ray Rinaudo. He also returned to broadcasting as a presenter on community radio station 4MBS. Dean was appointed to the Magistrates Court of Queensland on 23 June 1997 and retired on 12 June 2007 when he reached the mandatory retirement age of 65, having served mostly in Brisbane with a stint in Warwick between 1999 and 2002. He continued as a magistrate until 2007.

== Death ==
Dean died on 27 July 2023, at the age of 81.

Parliament of Australia
Preceded by Robert Bonnett	Member for Herbert; 1977–1983	Succeeded by Ted Lindsay
