= Division of Herbert =

Australian federal electoral division

Coordinates: 19.208°S 146.616°E

Herbert Australian House of Representatives Division
- Interactive map of boundaries since the 2019 federal election
- Created: 1901
- MP: Phillip Thompson
- Party: Liberal (Note: Member of the Liberal National Party of Queensland sitting with the federal parliamentary Liberal Party.)
- Namesake: Sir Robert Herbert
- Electors: 121,315 (2025)
- Area: 946 km^{2} (365.3 sq mi)
- Demographic: Provincial
Electorates around Herbert:
Kennedy	Pacific Ocean	Pacific Ocean
Kennedy	Herbert	Pacific Ocean
Kennedy	Kennedy	Dawson

The Division of Herbert is an Australian electoral division in the state of Queensland. It covers the city of Townsville and surrounding areas to the west, as well as Magnetic Island and Palm Island.

Its MP has been Phillip Thompson of the Liberal Party since 2019.

== Geography ==
Since 1984, federal electoral division boundaries in Australia have been determined at redistributions by a redistribution committee appointed by the Australian Electoral Commission. Redistributions occur for the boundaries of divisions in a particular state, and they occur every seven years, or sooner if a state's representation entitlement changes or when divisions of a state are malapportioned.

The Division of Herbert is centred on Townsville and also includes Magnetic Island and Palm Island in the Coral Sea.

== History ==
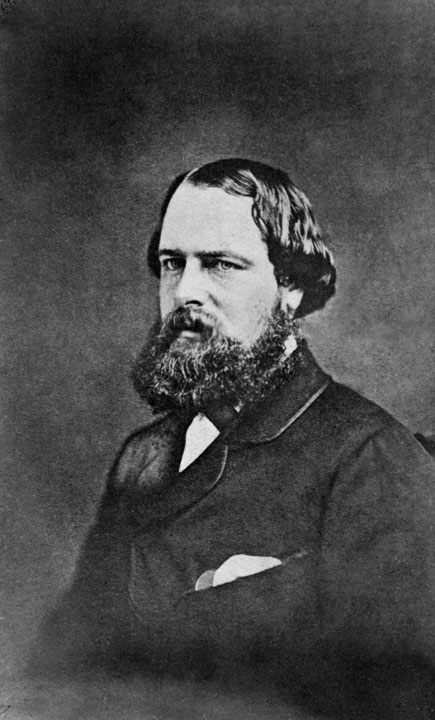
Sir Robert Herbert, the division's namesake

The division was proclaimed in 1900, and was one of the original 65 divisions at the first federal election. It is located in northern Queensland, and is named after Sir Robert Herbert, the first Premier of Queensland (1859–1866). It has always been based around the city of Townsville.

On its original boundaries, it covered most of north-eastern Queensland, stretching from Mackay to the Torres Strait. Much of its northern portion, including Cairns and the Cape York Peninsula, transferred to Kennedy in 1934 (those areas are now part of Leichhardt). Its south-eastern portion, including Mackay, became Dawson in 1949. By 1984, successive redistributions cut back the area of the seat to little more than Townsville and its inner suburbs.

The electorate had long been noteworthy as one of Australia's bellwether seats. It was won by the party of government for all but two terms from the 1966 election until the 2007 election, at which it was hotly contested, with local identity and businessman George Colbran pre-selected by Labor. However, Liberal incumbent Peter Lindsay managed to retain the seat with a wafer-thin 50.2 percent two-party-preferred vote after a 6 percent two-party swing against him, although his party lost government. Ewen Jones of the merged Liberal National Party succeeded Lindsay and retained the seat at the following two elections, with increased margins.

Herbert featured the closest result of any electorate at the 2016 federal election. Following a recount, the Australian Electoral Commission confirmed that Labor's Cathy O'Toole had defeated the LNP incumbent by 37 votes, becoming the first Labor member to win the seat since 1996. The LNP considered a legal challenge to the result. The LNP regained the seat with a big swing to it at 2019, part of a large swing to the LNP in Queensland and, in 2022, the seat again swung to the Coalition, bucking the national and statewide swing to Labor.

== Members ==
Image	Member	Party	Term	Notes
	Fred Bamford (1849–1934)	Labor	30 March 1901 – 14 November 1916	Served as minister under Hughes. Retired
	Fred Bamford (1849–1934)	National Labor	14 November 1916 – 17 February 1917	Served as minister under Hughes. Retired
	Fred Bamford (1849–1934)	Nationalist	17 February 1917 – 3 October 1925	Served as minister under Hughes. Retired
	Lewis Nott (1886–1951)	Nationalist	14 November 1925 – 17 November 1928	Lost seat. Later elected to the Division of Australian Capital Territory in 1949
	George Martens (1874–1949)	Labor	17 November 1928 – 16 August 1946	Retired
	Bill Edmonds (1903–1968)	Labor	28 September 1946 – 22 November 1958	Lost seat
	John Murray (1915–2009)	Liberal	22 November 1958 – 9 December 1961	Lost seat. Later elected to the Legislative Assembly of Queensland seat of Clayfield in 1963
	Ted Harding (1921–2004)	Labor	9 December 1961 – 26 November 1966	Lost seat
	Duke Bonnett (1916–1994)	Liberal	26 November 1966 – 10 November 1977	Retired
	Gordon Dean (1943–2023)	Liberal	10 December 1977 – 5 March 1983	Lost seat
	Ted Lindsay (1942–)	Labor	5 March 1983 – 2 March 1996	Lost seat
	Peter Lindsay (1944–)	Liberal	2 March 1996 – 19 July 2010	Retired
	Ewen Jones (1960–2023)	Liberal	21 August 2010 – 2 July 2016	Lost seat
	Cathy O'Toole (1956–)	Labor	2 July 2016 – 18 May 2019	Lost seat
	Phillip Thompson (1988–)	Liberal	18 May 2019 – present	Incumbent

== Election results ==
2025 Australian federal election: Herbert
Party	Candidate	Votes	%	±%
Liberal National	Phillip Thompson	47,941	48.74	+1.73
Labor	Edwina Andrew	22,646	23.02	+1.42
Greens	Chris Evans	9,228	9.38	+1.16
Katter's Australian	Darryn Casson	6,559	6.67	−0.33
One Nation	Ross Macdonald	5,100	5.18	−0.09
People First	Felicity Cole	3,255	3.31	+3.31
Trumpet of Patriots	Martin Brewster	2,173	2.21	+2.21
Family First	Felicity Roser	1,460	1.48	+1.48
Total formal votes		98,362	94.89	+0.66
Informal votes		5,300	5.11	−0.66
Turnout		103,662	85.47	−0.46
Two-party-preferred result
Liberal National	Phillip Thompson	62,374	63.41	+1.64
Labor	Edwina Andrew	35,988	36.59	−1.64
Liberal National hold		Swing	+1.64	
