= Merinda meatworks (Bowen) =

The Bowen Meatworks, also called the Merinda Meatworks or Bowen Freezerworks was an important business to the foundation of the economy of Bowen, Queensland, Australia since 1894.

It was started as the Bowen Meat Export and Agency Co. as part of Australian parliamentary plans to grow the Australian economy by exporting meat.

In 1932 the Meatworks was acquired by Thomas Borthwick and Sons (Australasia), Ltd., whose business supplied British Army meat contracts since 1923 of 6000 tons of frozen beef yearly.

Peak processing peak was 58,500 head in 1958. The meatworks was affected by union action and strikes and closed overnight in 1960's.

The TPC (Trade Practices Commission) was involved in the 1980s because of a sale that would create a meat monopoly which included Kerry Packer as one of the associated parties. Borthwicks was sold to AMH but the TPC gave the new ownership 3 months to sell it again.

The meatworks closed in 1996/1997 as part of industry rationalisation. in 1998 a petition to parliament regarding the meat industry succeeded and the license to export meat was revoked.

== History ==
In the 1890s the export trade of meat was earmarked for Australia's economic growth. Parliament developed “The Meat and Dairy Produce Encouragement Act” which allowed for establishment of meatworks at Bowen and other places in Queensland.

In 1894 operations were started by local cattlemen under the Bowen Meat Export and Agency Co. The meatworks employed 200-400 men from the local area and processed an average of 15,000 cattle per annum, the best year being 30,000 head. In 1905, Bergl Australia acquired the plant, at the time known as Merinda. See picture from 1906. In 1922, the Meatworks was able to process 150 bullocks per day.

In 1931, Bergl had installed modern machinery. In 1932 the meatworks was purchased by Borthwick's as Thomas Borthwicks and Sons with the Intention of commencement of export operations (after being idle for sometime). Borthwicks had obtained prominent army contracts for meat supplies in 1923 which was the bulk of the war office's yearly contract (6,000 tonnes for home command). In 1933, Borthwick & Son purchased the meatworks, rebuilding it and making extensions. From 1905, Borthwicks had begun purchasing meatworks in Australia and played an important part in industrial relations until the 1980s.

In 1941 the factory had around 300 employees and was able to process 376 cattle a day for export.

A disaster happened at the plant in 1941 when 800 tonnes of stored meat were destroyed in a fire. The oil stove used to heat bitumen (which sealed the cork insulation) caught fire.

Peak processing peak was reached in 1958 of 58,500 for the year. In the 1960s union actions and strikes caused the plant to shut down overnight.

The TPC (Trade Practices Commission) was involved in the 1980s because of a sale of Borthwicks would create a meat monopoly in the area, which included Kerry Packer as one of the associated parties.

1996 the plant was closed because of industry rationalisation and 1997 more permanently closed. In 1998 a petition was presented to Parliament to revoke the export licenses for Merinda Meatworks, the Nippon Meat Co. The petition included initiating a review of foreign investment guidelines in Australia including ensuring a code of conduct is adhered to which protects the interests of all stakeholders.

== See also ==
- Ross River Meatworks Chimney
- Alligator Creek meatworks
