= Results of the 2022 Australian federal election in Queensland =

Federal election results in Queensland, Australia

2022 Australian federal election (Queensland)
- 21 May 2022

All 30 Queensland seats in the Australian House of Representatives and 6 seats in the Australian Senate
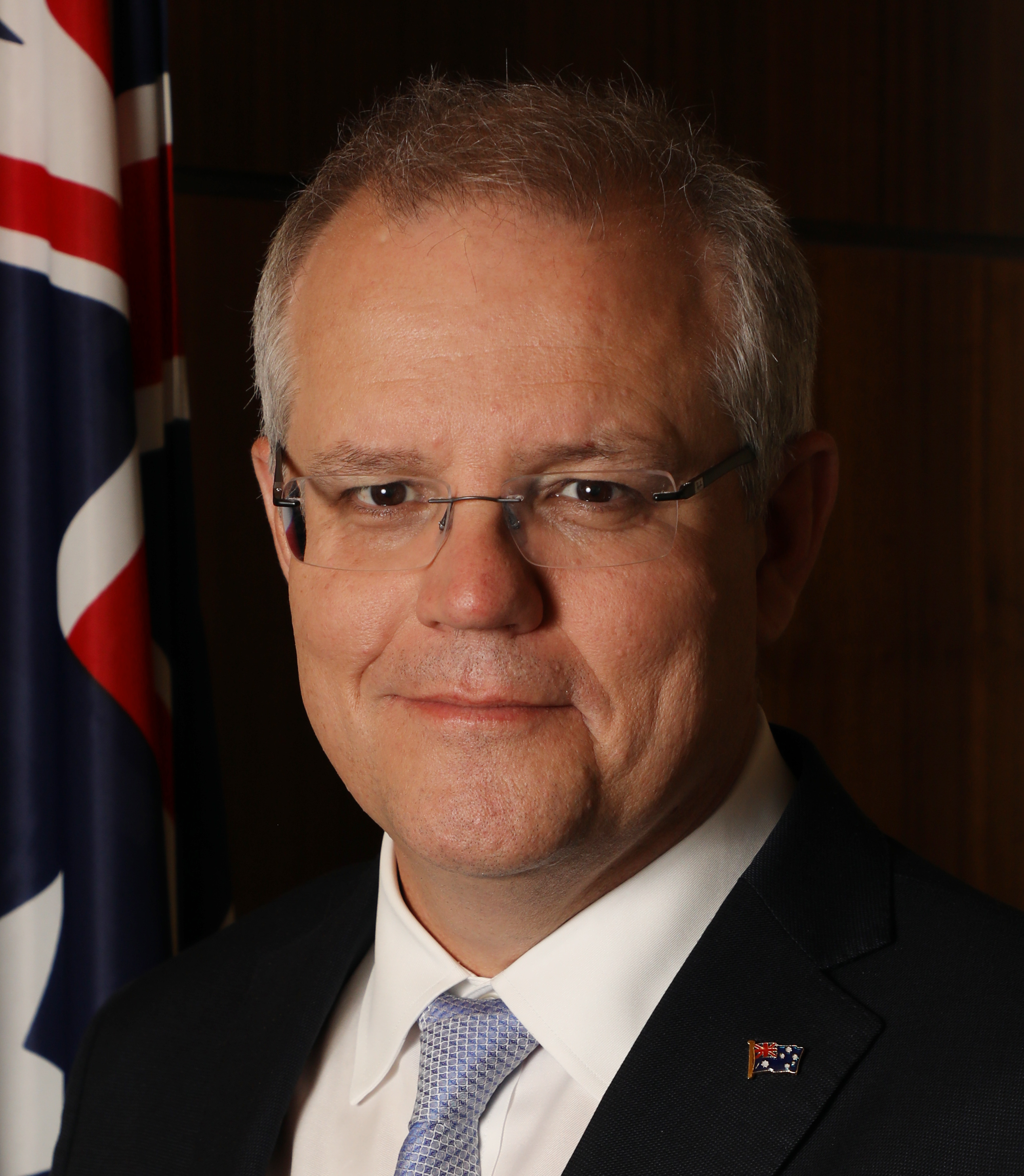

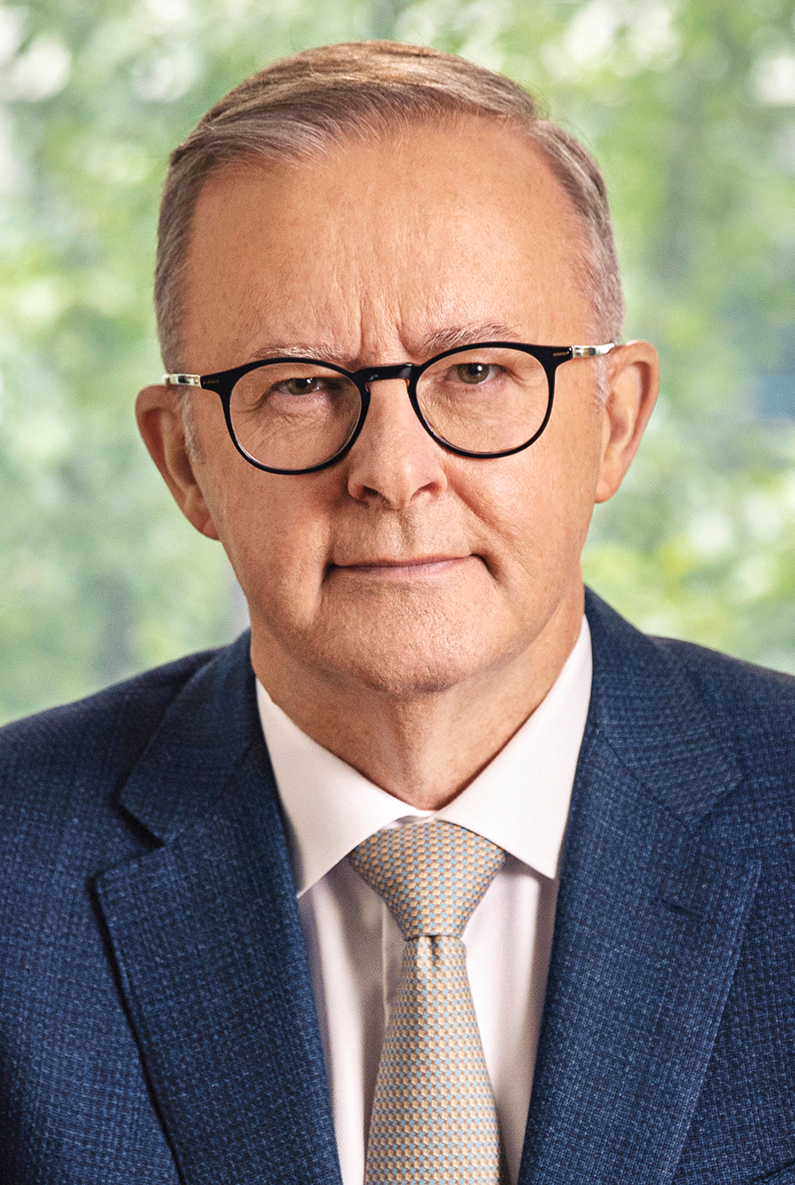

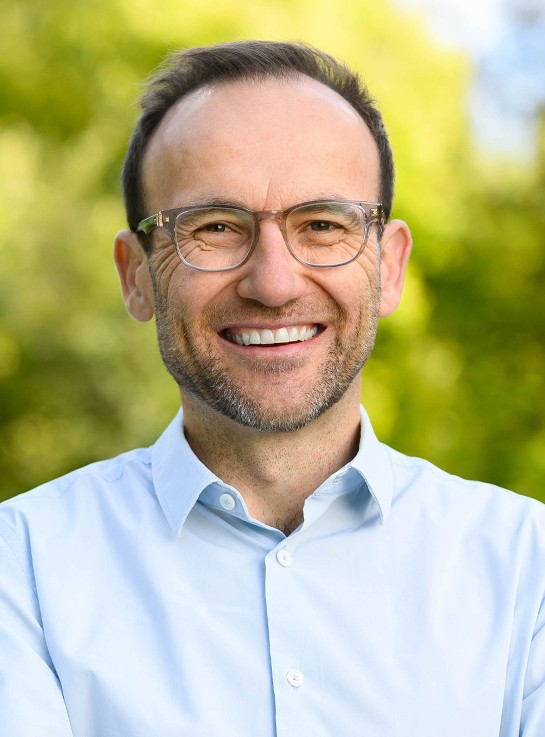

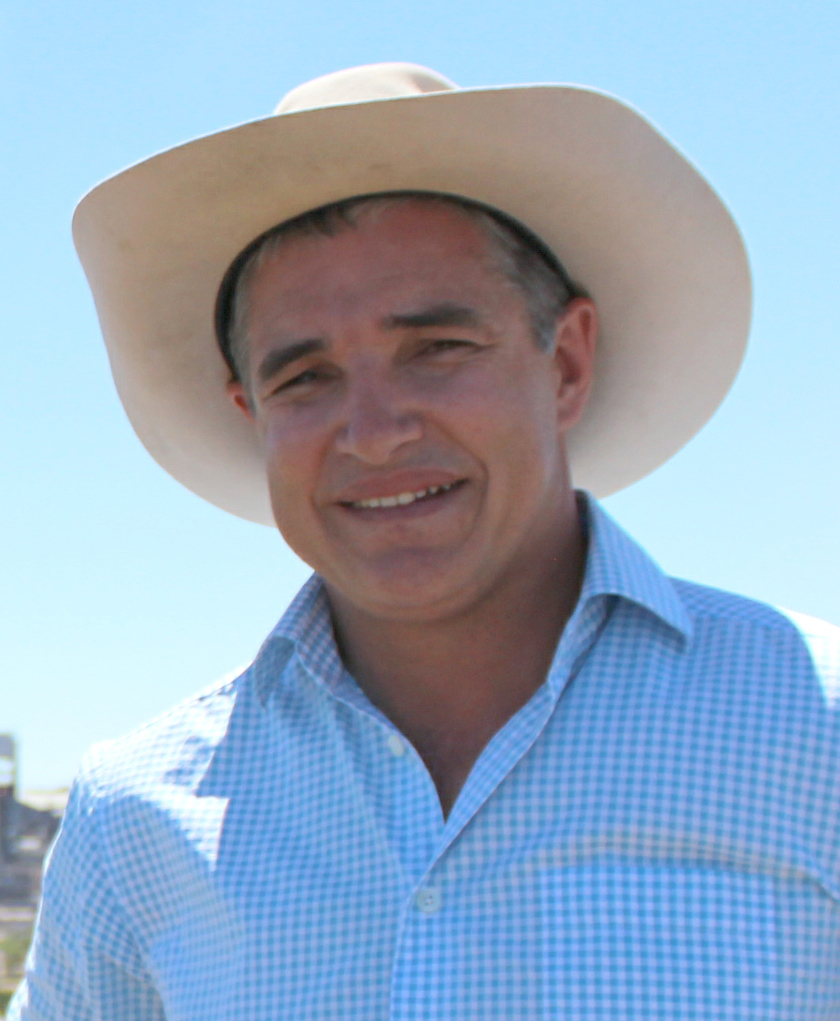
	First party	Second party
Leader	Scott Morrison	Anthony Albanese
Party	Liberal/National coalition	Labor
Last election	23 seats	6 seats
Seats won	21	5
Seat change	▼2	▼1
Popular vote	1,172,515	811,069
Percentage	39.64%	27.42%
Swing	▼4.06	▲0.74
TPP	54.05%	45.95%
TPP swing	▼4.39	▲4.39
	Third party	Fourth party
Leader	Adam Bandt	Robbie Katter
Party	Greens	Katter's Australian
Last election	0 seats	1 seat
Seats won	3	1
Seat change	▲3	Steady
Popular vote	382,900	55,863
Percentage	12.94%	1.89%
Swing	▲2.62	▼0.58
- Results by division for the House of Representatives, shaded by winning party's margin of victory.

This is a list of electoral division results for the 2022 Australian federal election in the state of Queensland.

This election was held using instant-runoff voting.

In Queensland in this election, there were two "turn-overs"—the Australian Greens took two seats where the Greens candidate was not leading in the first count. These took place in Brisbane and Ryan.

== Overall results ==
House of Representatives (IRV) – Turnout 88.16% (CV)
Party	Votes	%	Swing (pp)	Seats	Change (seats)
Liberal National Party (Qld)	1,172,515	39.64	−4.06	21	▼2
Australian Labor Party	811,069	27.42	+0.74	5	▼1
Australian Greens	382,900	12.94	+2.62	3	▲3
Pauline Hanson's One Nation	221,640	7.49	−1.37	0	Steady
United Australia Party	149,255	5.05	+1.54	0	Steady
Katter's Australian Party	55,863	1.89	−0.58	1	Steady
Liberal Democratic Party	28,737	0.97	+0.52	0	Steady
Animal Justice Party	24,813	0.84	+0.40	0	Steady
Informed Medical Options Party	10,894	0.37	+0.37	0	Steady
Australian Federation Party	8,195	0.28	+0.28	0	Steady
The Great Australian Party	7,775	0.26	+0.26	0	Steady
Legalise Cannabis	6,025	0.20	+0.20	0	Steady
Australian Values Party	5,470	0.18	+0.18	0	Steady
Socialist Alliance	3,729	0.13	+0.08	0	Steady
Shooters, Fishers and Farmers Party	3,695	0.12	+0.12	0	Steady
TNL	1,971	0.07	+0.07	0	Steady
Fusion	930	0.03	+0.03	0	Steady
Australian Progressives	606	0.02	−0.01	0	Steady
Independent	61,944	2.09	+0.82	0	Steady
Total	2,958,026	100.00	–	30	Steady
Invalid/blank votes	128,732	4.17	−0.78	–	–
Turnout	3,086,758	88.16	–3.06	–	–
Registered voters	3,501,287	–	–	–	–
Two-party-preferred vote
Liberal National	1,598,802	54.05	–4.39	–	–
Labor	1,359,224	45.95	+4.39	–	–
Source: AEC for both votes and seats

== Results by division ==
=== Blair ===
2022 Australian federal election: Blair
Party	Candidate	Votes	%	±%
Labor	Shayne Neumann	36,494	35.01	+3.75
Liberal National	Sam Biggins	30,122	28.89	−0.14
Greens	Danielle Mutton	13,113	12.58	+3.90
One Nation	Liz Suduk	10,419	9.99	−6.81
United Australia	Quinton Cunningham	6,353	6.09	+2.69
Liberal Democrats	Michelle Jaques	3,080	2.95	+2.95
Animal Justice	Angela Lowery	2,563	2.46	+2.46
Australian Values	Maria Pitman	2,103	2.02	+2.02
Total formal votes		104,247	94.70	+2.19
Informal votes		5,832	5.30	−2.19
Turnout		110,079	87.11	−4.23
Two-party-preferred result
Labor	Shayne Neumann	57,575	55.23	+4.02
Liberal National	Sam Biggins	46,672	44.77	−4.02
Labor hold		Swing	+4.02	

Alluvial diagram for preference flows in the seat of Blair in the 2022 federal election. indicates at what stage the winning candidate had over 50% of the votes and was declared the winner.

=== Bonner ===
2022 Australian federal election: Bonner
Party	Candidate	Votes	%	±%
Liberal National	Ross Vasta	43,191	44.82	−4.67
Labor	Tabatha Young	28,491	29.56	−1.54
Greens	Bernard Lakey	16,144	16.75	+5.06
One Nation	Amanda Neil	5,371	5.57	+1.57
United Australia	Serge Diklich	3,177	3.30	+0.76
Total formal votes		96,374	97.50	+0.43
Informal votes		2,467	2.50	−0.43
Turnout		98,841	90.57	−2.19
Two-party-preferred result
Liberal National	Ross Vasta	51,471	53.41	−4.00
Labor	Tabatha Young	44,903	46.59	+4.00
Liberal National hold		Swing	−4.00	

Alluvial diagram for preference flows in the seat of Bonner in the 2022 federal election. indicates at what stage the winning candidate had over 50% of the votes and was declared the winner.

=== Bowman ===
2022 Australian federal election: Bowman
Party	Candidate	Votes	%	±%
Liberal National	Henry Pike	43,088	42.37	−6.30
Labor	Donisha Duff	29,694	29.20	+2.61
Greens	Ian Mazlin	13,241	13.02	+1.03
One Nation	Walter Todd	7,825	7.69	+0.39
United Australia	Mary-Jane Stevens	6,601	6.49	+2.89
TNL	Phil Johnson	1,243	1.22	+1.22
Total formal votes		101,692	97.09	+0.49
Informal votes		3,045	2.91	−0.49
Turnout		104,737	90.51	−2.53
Two-party-preferred result
Liberal National	Henry Pike	56,447	55.51	−4.73
Labor	Donisha Duff	45,245	44.49	+4.73
Liberal National hold		Swing	−4.73	

Alluvial diagram for preference flows in the seat of Bowman in the 2022 federal election. indicates at what stage the winning candidate had over 50% of the votes and was declared the winner.

=== Brisbane ===
2022 Australian federal election: Brisbane
Party	Candidate	Votes	%	±%
Liberal National	Trevor Evans	41,032	37.71	−10.13
Labor	Madonna Jarrett	29,652	27.25	+2.76
Greens	Stephen Bates	29,641	27.24	+4.87
One Nation	Trevor Hold	2,429	2.23	−0.26
Animal Justice	Tiana Kennedy	2,135	1.96	+1.96
United Australia	Justin Knudson	2,102	1.93	+0.54
Liberal Democrats	Anthony Bull	1,807	1.66	+1.66
Total formal votes		108,798	97.92	+0.44
Informal votes		2,312	2.08	−0.44
Turnout		111,110	88.74	−1.77
Notional two-party-preferred count
Labor	Madonna Jarrett	59,183	54.40	+9.32
Liberal National	Trevor Evans	49,615	45.60	−9.32
Two-candidate-preferred result
Greens	Stephen Bates	58,460	53.73	+53.73
Liberal National	Trevor Evans	50,338	46.27	−8.65
Greens gain from Liberal National				

Alluvial diagram for preference flows in the seat of Brisbane in the 2022 federal election. indicates at what stage the winning candidate had over 50% of the votes and was declared the winner.

=== Capricornia ===
2022 Australian federal election: Capricornia
Party	Candidate	Votes	%	±%
Liberal National	Michelle Landry	35,613	39.44	−1.21
Labor	Russell Robertson	25,330	28.05	+4.31
One Nation	Kylee Stanton	13,179	14.60	−2.38
Greens	Mick Jones	5,302	5.87	+1.03
United Australia	Nathan Harding	3,555	3.94	+0.29
Independent	Ken Murray	3,048	3.38	+0.89
Great Australian	Zteven Whitty	1,747	1.93	+1.93
Liberal Democrats	Steve Murphy	1,392	1.54	+1.54
Informed Medical Options	Paula Ganfield	1,126	1.25	+1.25
Total formal votes		90,292	93.86	+0.19
Informal votes		5,904	6.14	−0.19
Turnout		96,196	88.60	−3.98
Two-party-preferred result
Liberal National	Michelle Landry	51,096	56.59	−5.76
Labor	Russell Robertson	39,196	43.41	+5.76
Liberal National hold		Swing	−5.76	

Alluvial diagram for preference flows in the seat of Capricornia in the 2022 federal election. indicates at what stage the winning candidate had over 50% of the votes and was declared the winner.

=== Dawson ===
2022 Australian federal election: Dawson
Party	Candidate	Votes	%	±%
Liberal National	Andrew Willcox	40,109	43.33	+0.38
Labor	Shane Hamilton	22,650	24.47	+4.19
One Nation	Julie Hall	12,289	13.27	+0.18
Greens	Paula Creen	6,675	7.21	+2.70
Katter's Australian	Ciaron Paterson	5,189	5.61	−0.71
United Australia	Christian Young	3,713	4.01	−0.89
Great Australian	Jim Jackson	1,948	2.10	+2.10
Total formal votes		92,573	95.86	+2.87
Informal votes		4,001	4.14	−2.87
Turnout		96,574	87.49	−3.30
Two-party-preferred result
Liberal National	Andrew Willcox	55,930	60.42	−4.19
Labor	Shane Hamilton	36,643	39.58	+4.19
Liberal National hold		Swing	−4.19	

Alluvial diagram for preference flows in the seat of Dawson in the 2022 federal election. indicates at what stage the winning candidate had over 50% of the votes and was declared the winner.

The sitting member, George Christensen, was elected as a Liberal National, but resigned from the party in 2022, subsequently joining One Nation and contested a Senate seat.

=== Dickson ===
2022 Australian federal election: Dickson
Party	Candidate	Votes	%	±%
Liberal National	Peter Dutton	41,657	42.07	−3.86
Labor	Ali France	31,396	31.70	+0.37
Greens	Vinnie Batten	12,871	13.00	+3.02
One Nation	Tamera Gibson	5,312	5.36	+0.18
United Australia	Alina Ward	2,717	2.74	+0.50
Independent	Alan Buchbach	2,222	2.24	+2.24
Independent	Thor Prohaska	1,618	1.63	−0.74
Liberal Democrats	Lloyd Russell	1,236	1.25	+1.25
Total formal votes		99,029	96.12	+0.48
Informal votes		3,996	3.88	−0.48
Turnout		103,025	91.35	−2.32
Two-party-preferred result
Liberal National	Peter Dutton	51,196	51.70	−2.94
Labor	Ali France	47,833	48.30	+2.94
Liberal National hold		Swing	−2.94	

Alluvial diagram for preference flows in the seat of Dickson in the 2022 federal election. indicates at what stage the winning candidate had over 50% of the votes and was declared the winner.

=== Fadden ===
2022 Australian federal election: Fadden
Party	Candidate	Votes	%	±%
Liberal National	Stuart Robert	47,190	44.62	−4.10
Labor	Letitia Del Fabbro	23,638	22.35	−0.16
Greens	Sally Spain	11,353	10.73	+1.73
One Nation	Sandy Roach	9,177	8.68	+0.11
United Australia	Nathan O'Brien	7,014	6.63	+1.52
Independent	Stewart Brooker	4,407	4.17	+4.17
Liberal Democrats	Alex Forbes	2,992	2.83	−1.69
Total formal votes		105,771	95.69	+0.60
Informal votes		4,760	4.31	−0.60
Turnout		110,531	86.54	−3.09
Two-party-preferred result
Liberal National	Stuart Robert	64,126	60.63	−3.55
Labor	Letitia Del Fabbro	41,645	39.37	+3.55
Liberal National hold		Swing	−3.55	

Alluvial diagram for preference flows in the seat of Fadden in the 2022 federal election. indicates at what stage the winning candidate had over 50% of the votes and was declared the winner.

=== Fairfax ===
2022 Australian federal election: Fairfax
Party	Candidate	Votes	%	±%
Liberal National	Ted O'Brien	46,551	44.91	−4.71
Labor	Sue Ferguson	22,662	21.86	+0.38
Greens	Sue Etheridge	13,862	13.37	+0.78
One Nation	Nikki Civitarese	6,798	6.56	−1.29
United Australia	Lisa Khoury	6,132	5.92	+2.86
Animal Justice	Tash Poole	2,182	2.10	+2.10
Informed Medical Options	Wendy Hazelton	1,997	1.93	+1.93
Independent	Barry Smith	1,423	1.37	+1.37
Great Australian	Craig White	1,319	1.27	+1.27
Independent	Sinim Australie	733	0.71	−0.64
Total formal votes		103,659	94.47	+0.90
Informal votes		6,066	5.53	−0.90
Turnout		109,725	88.99	−2.45
Two-party-preferred result
Liberal National	Ted O'Brien	61,108	58.95	−4.49
Labor	Sue Ferguson	42,551	41.05	+4.49
Liberal National hold		Swing	−4.49	

Alluvial diagram for preference flows in the seat of Fairfax in the 2022 federal election. indicates at what stage the winning candidate had over 50% of the votes and was declared the winner.

=== Fisher ===
2022 Australian federal election: Fisher
Party	Candidate	Votes	%	±%
Liberal National	Andrew Wallace	48,013	44.25	−5.79
Labor	Judene Andrews	25,313	23.33	+1.11
Greens	Renay Wells	14,981	13.81	+1.40
One Nation	Sam Schriever	10,102	9.31	+0.63
United Australia	Tony Moore	7,355	6.78	+3.32
Animal Justice	Vickie Breckenridge	2,730	2.52	+2.52
Total formal votes		108,494	96.85	+1.65
Informal votes		3,530	3.15	−1.65
Turnout		112,024	89.07	−2.89
Two-party-preferred result
Liberal National	Andrew Wallace	63,656	58.67	−4.03
Labor	Judene Andrews	44,838	41.33	+4.03
Liberal National hold		Swing	−4.03	

Alluvial diagram for preference flows in the seat of Fisher in the 2022 federal election. indicates at what stage the winning candidate had over 50% of the votes and was declared the winner.

=== Flynn ===
2022 Australian federal election: Flynn
Party	Candidate	Votes	%	±%
Liberal National	Colin Boyce	34,046	36.88	−1.01
Labor	Matt Burnett	30,948	33.53	+4.88
One Nation	Sharon Lohse	11,287	12.23	−7.37
United Australia	Tanya Wieden	6,266	6.79	+2.54
Greens	Paul Bambrick	4,007	4.34	+1.27
Independent	Duncan Scott	3,745	4.06	+2.51
Great Australian	Carla Svendsen	2,012	2.18	+2.18
Total formal votes		92,311	96.17	+1.98
Informal votes		3,672	3.83	−1.98
Turnout		95,983	88.07	−4.08
Two-party-preferred result
Liberal National	Colin Boyce	49,682	53.82	−4.84
Labor	Matt Burnett	42,629	46.18	+4.84
Liberal National hold		Swing	−4.84	

Alluvial diagram for preference flows in the seat of Flynn in the 2022 federal election. indicates at what stage the winning candidate had over 50% of the votes and was declared the winner.

=== Forde ===
2022 Australian federal election: Forde
Party	Candidate	Votes	%	±%
Liberal National	Bert van Manen	34,920	36.91	−6.59
Labor	Rowan Holzberger	26,497	28.01	−1.50
Greens	Jordan Hall	9,319	9.85	+1.12
One Nation	Seschelle Matterson	7,578	8.01	−3.80
United Australia	Roxanne O'Halloran	7,485	7.91	+3.87
Independent	Christopher Greaves	2,973	3.14	+3.14
Liberal Democrats	Tobby Sutherland	2,668	2.82	+2.82
Animal Justice	Linda McCarthy	2,444	2.58	+2.58
TNL	Samuel Holland	728	0.77	+0.77
Total formal votes		94,612	93.22	−2.14
Informal votes		6,884	6.78	+2.14
Turnout		101,496	85.23	−4.26
Two-party-preferred result
Liberal National	Bert van Manen	51,311	54.23	−4.37
Labor	Rowan Holzberger	43,301	45.77	+4.37
Liberal National hold		Swing	−4.37	

Alluvial diagram for preference flows in the seat of Forde in the 2022 federal election. indicates at what stage the winning candidate had over 50% of the votes and was declared the winner.

=== Griffith ===
2022 Australian federal election: Griffith
Party	Candidate	Votes	%	±%
Greens	Max Chandler-Mather	36,771	34.59	+10.94
Liberal National	Olivia Roberts	32,685	30.74	−10.23
Labor	Terri Butler	30,769	28.94	−2.01
One Nation	Shari Ware	3,504	3.30	+1.18
United Australia	Robert McMullan	2,581	2.43	+0.98
Total formal votes		106,310	98.00	+0.26
Informal votes		2,169	2.00	−0.26
Turnout		108,479	89.45	−1.60
Notional two-party-preferred count
Labor	Terri Butler	64,923	61.07	+8.21
Liberal National	Olivia Roberts	41,387	38.93	−8.21
Two-candidate-preferred result
Greens	Max Chandler-Mather	64,271	60.46	+60.46
Liberal National	Olivia Roberts	42,039	39.54	−7.59
Greens gain from Labor				

Alluvial diagram for preference flows in the seat of Griffith in the 2022 federal election. indicates at what stage the winning candidate had over 50% of the votes and was declared the winner.

=== Groom ===
2022 Australian federal election: Groom
Party	Candidate	Votes	%	±%
Liberal National	Garth Hamilton	41,971	43.72	−9.62
Labor	Gen Allpass	17,985	18.73	+0.07
One Nation	Grant Abraham	9,181	9.56	−3.53
Independent	Suzie Holt	7,932	8.26	+8.26
Independent	Kirstie Smolenski	6,858	7.14	+7.14
Greens	Mickey Berry	5,616	5.85	−2.11
United Australia	Melissa Bannister	4,922	5.13	+1.17
Federation	Ryan Otto	1,539	1.60	+1.60
Total formal votes		96,004	95.28	−1.52
Informal votes		4,758	4.72	+1.52
Turnout		100,762	90.88	−2.17
Notional two-party-preferred count
Liberal National	Garth Hamilton	61,610	64.17	−6.31
Labor	Gen Allpass	34,394	35.83	+6.31
Two-candidate-preferred result
Liberal National	Garth Hamilton	54,612	56.89	−13.59
Independent	Suzie Holt	41,392	43.11	+43.11
Liberal National hold		Swing	−13.59	

Alluvial diagram for preference flows in the seat of Groom in the 2022 federal election. indicates at what stage the winning candidate had over 50% of the votes and was declared the winner.

=== Herbert ===
2022 Australian federal election: Herbert
Party	Candidate	Votes	%	±%
Liberal National	Phillip Thompson	43,453	47.01	+9.90
Labor	John Ring	19,971	21.60	−3.85
Greens	Scott Humphreys	7,596	8.22	+0.91
Katter's Australian	Clynton Hawks	6,472	7.00	−2.80
One Nation	Diane Pepe	4,874	5.27	−5.82
Independent	Angela Egan	2,983	3.23	+3.23
United Australia	Greg Dowling	2,383	2.58	−3.12
Informed Medical Options	Toni McMahon	1,658	1.79	+1.79
Animal Justice	Toni McCormack	1,359	1.47	−0.25
Independent	Steven Clare	942	1.02	+1.02
Great Australian	Larna Ballard	749	0.81	+0.81
Total formal votes		92,440	94.23	+0.13
Informal votes		5,658	5.77	−0.13
Turnout		98,098	85.93	−4.13
Two-party-preferred result
Liberal National	Phillip Thompson	57,103	61.77	+3.41
Labor	John Ring	35,337	38.23	−3.41
Liberal National hold		Swing	+3.41	

Alluvial diagram for preference flows in the seat of Herbert in the 2022 federal election. indicates at what stage the winning candidate had over 50% of the votes and was declared the winner.

=== Hinkler ===
2022 Australian federal election: Hinkler
Party	Candidate	Votes	%	±%
Liberal National	Keith Pitt	42,720	42.13	−3.90
Labor	Jason Scanes	23,634	23.31	+0.38
Independent	Jack Dempsey	13,236	13.05	+13.05
One Nation	Zak Menhennett	8,837	8.71	−6.09
United Australia	Kristie Nash	7,417	7.31	+2.93
Greens	Andrew McLean	5,562	5.48	+1.76
Total formal votes		101,406	96.73	+4.55
Informal votes		3,431	3.27	−4.55
Turnout		104,837	89.49	−3.21
Two-party-preferred result
Liberal National	Keith Pitt	60,918	60.07	−4.43
Labor	Jason Scanes	40,488	39.93	+4.43
Liberal National hold		Swing	−4.43	

Alluvial diagram for preference flows in the seat of Hinkler in the 2022 federal election. indicates at what stage the winning candidate had over 50% of the votes and was declared the winner.

=== Kennedy ===
2022 Australian federal election: Kennedy
Party	Candidate	Votes	%	±%
Katter's Australian	Bob Katter	39,036	41.70	+0.74
Liberal National	Bryce Macdonald	26,387	28.19	+0.71
Labor	Jason Brandon	15,033	16.06	−0.92
Greens	Jennifer Cox	6,013	6.42	+1.25
United Australia	Peter Campion	4,154	4.44	−2.22
Independent	Jen Sackley	2,981	3.18	+3.18
Total formal votes		93,604	96.72	+0.88
Informal votes		3,171	3.28	−0.88
Turnout		96,775	84.59	−4.51
Notional two-party-preferred count
Liberal National	Bryce Macdonald	56,312	60.16	−4.35
Labor	Jason Brandon	37,292	39.84	+4.35
Two-candidate-preferred result
Katter's Australian	Bob Katter	59,060	63.10	−0.23
Liberal National	Bryce Macdonald	34,544	36.90	+0.23
Katter's Australian hold		Swing	−0.23	

Alluvial diagram for preference flows in the seat of Kennedy in the 2022 federal election. indicates at what stage the winning candidate had over 50% of the votes and was declared the winner.

=== Leichhardt ===
2022 Australian federal election: Leichhardt
Party	Candidate	Votes	%	±%
Liberal National	Warren Entsch	33,652	36.70	−0.89
Labor	Elida Faith	25,312	27.60	−1.19
Greens	Phillip Musumeci	9,143	9.97	−0.43
One Nation	Geena Court	6,822	7.44	+1.39
Katter's Australian	Rod Jensen	5,166	5.63	−2.52
Socialist Alliance	Pat O'Shane	3,729	4.07	+4.07
United Australia	Daniel Hannagan	3,593	3.92	−0.05
Informed Medical Options	Silvia Mogorovich	1,641	1.79	+1.79
Animal Justice	Susanne Bayly	1,253	1.37	+1.37
Fusion	Adam Cropp	930	1.01	+1.01
Federation	Paul Roe	466	0.51	+0.51
Total formal votes		91,707	93.18	−0.40
Informal votes		6,715	6.82	+0.40
Turnout		98,422	83.97	−3.68
Two-party-preferred result
Liberal National	Warren Entsch	49,010	53.44	−0.73
Labor	Elida Faith	42,697	46.56	+0.73
Liberal National hold		Swing	−0.73	

Alluvial diagram for preference flows in the seat of Leichhardt in the 2022 federal election. indicates at what stage the winning candidate had over 50% of the votes and was declared the winner.

=== Lilley ===
2022 Australian federal election: Lilley
Party	Candidate	Votes	%	±%
Labor	Anika Wells	41,424	41.84	+6.20
Liberal National	Vivian Lobo	29,530	29.83	−10.95
Greens	Melissa Stevens	16,916	17.09	+3.08
One Nation	Michelle Wilde	4,027	4.07	−1.28
United Australia	Gerardine Hoogland	3,320	3.35	+1.10
Liberal Democrats	Daniel Freshwater	2,412	2.44	+2.44
Informed Medical Options	Stephen McGrath	1,378	1.39	+1.39
Total formal votes		99,007	97.30	+0.78
Informal votes		2,750	2.70	−0.78
Turnout		101,757	90.61	−1.54
Two-party-preferred result
Labor	Anika Wells	59,941	60.54	+9.90
Liberal National	Vivian Lobo	39,066	39.46	−9.90
Labor hold		Swing	+9.90	

Alluvial diagram for preference flows in the seat of Lilley in the 2022 federal election. indicates at what stage the winning candidate had over 50% of the votes and was declared the winner.

=== Longman ===
2022 Australian federal election: Longman
Party	Candidate	Votes	%	±%
Liberal National	Terry Young	41,253	38.17	−0.42
Labor	Rebecca Fanning	34,036	31.50	−2.60
One Nation	Ross Taylor	8,917	8.25	−4.97
Greens	Earl Snijders	7,814	7.23	+0.52
Legalise Cannabis	Nigel Quinlan	6,025	5.58	+5.58
United Australia	Stefanie Sutherland	5,949	5.51	+2.15
Animal Justice	Paula Gilbard	2,060	1.91	+1.91
Liberal Democrats	Jens Lipponer	2,011	1.86	+1.86
Total formal votes		108,065	95.01	+0.85
Informal votes		5,677	4.99	−0.85
Turnout		113,742	88.17	−3.99
Two-party-preferred result
Liberal National	Terry Young	57,359	53.08	−0.20
Labor	Rebecca Fanning	50,706	46.92	+0.20
Liberal National hold		Swing	−0.20	

Alluvial diagram for preference flows in the seat of Longman in the 2022 federal election. indicates at what stage the winning candidate had over 50% of the votes and was declared the winner.

=== Maranoa ===
2022 Australian federal election: Maranoa
Party	Candidate	Votes	%	±%
Liberal National	David Littleproud	52,382	56.26	+0.26
Labor	Dave Kerrigan	14,236	15.29	−0.26
One Nation	Mike Kelly	11,070	11.89	−2.73
United Australia	Nathan McDonald	6,202	6.66	+3.03
Greens	Ellisa Parker	4,533	4.87	+1.45
Shooters, Fishers, Farmers	Malcolm Richardson	3,695	3.97	+3.97
Federation	Brett Tunbridge	997	1.07	+1.07
Total formal votes		93,115	96.64	+0.59
Informal votes		3,234	3.36	−0.59
Turnout		96,349	88.39	−3.54
Two-party-preferred result
Liberal National	David Littleproud	67,153	72.12	−3.30
Labor	Dave Kerrigan	25,962	27.88	+3.30
Liberal National hold		Swing	−3.30	

Alluvial diagram for preference flows in the seat of Maranoa in the 2022 federal election. The winning candidate got over 50% of first preference votes, so this alluvial diagram is indicative only, and preference flows were not used to determine the final result. The preference flows were used to determine the two-candidate-preferred.

=== McPherson ===
2022 Australian federal election: McPherson
Party	Candidate	Votes	%	±%
Liberal National	Karen Andrews	42,288	43.56	−4.68
Labor	Carl Ungerer	21,354	22.00	−0.85
Greens	Scott Turner	14,971	15.42	+4.43
One Nation	Kevin Hargraves	7,013	7.22	+1.36
United Australia	Joshua Berrigan	6,490	6.69	+3.36
Australian Values	Andy Cullen	2,310	2.38	+2.38
Liberal Democrats	Glenn Pyne	2,063	2.12	−1.36
Federation	Gary Pead	594	0.61	+0.61
Total formal votes		97,083	94.58	+0.91
Informal votes		5,565	5.42	−0.91
Turnout		102,648	87.56	−2.84
Two-party-preferred result
Liberal National	Karen Andrews	57,605	59.34	−2.86
Labor	Carl Ungerer	39,478	40.66	+2.86
Liberal National hold		Swing	−2.86	

Alluvial diagram for preference flows in the seat of McPherson in the 2022 federal election. indicates at what stage the winning candidate had over 50% of the votes and was declared the winner.

=== Moncrieff ===
2022 Australian federal election: Moncrieff
Party	Candidate	Votes	%	±%
Liberal National	Angie Bell	45,104	45.94	−5.58
Labor	Glen Palmer	20,430	20.81	−0.75
Greens	April Broadbent	11,850	12.07	+2.39
One Nation	Leeanne Schultz	6,981	7.11	+0.67
United Australia	Diane Happ	5,482	5.58	+1.86
Liberal Democrats	Diane Demetre	4,305	4.38	+2.42
Animal Justice	Sonia Berry-Law	2,384	2.43	−1.43
Informed Medical Options	Timothy Cudmore	997	1.02	+1.02
Federation	James Tayler	645	0.66	+0.66
Total formal votes		98,178	94.22	+0.66
Informal votes		6,020	5.78	−0.66
Turnout		104,198	85.03	−3.17
Two-party-preferred result
Liberal National	Angie Bell	60,080	61.19	−4.17
Labor	Glen Palmer	38,098	38.81	+4.17
Liberal National hold		Swing	−4.17	

Alluvial diagram for preference flows in the seat of Moncrieff in the 2022 federal election. indicates at what stage the winning candidate had over 50% of the votes and was declared the winner.

=== Moreton ===
2022 Australian federal election: Moreton
Party	Candidate	Votes	%	±%
Labor	Graham Perrett	34,633	37.42	+2.27
Liberal National	Steven Huang	30,777	33.25	−7.58
Greens	Claire Garton	19,250	20.80	+4.04
One Nation	Neil Swann	3,364	3.63	+0.32
United Australia	Chelsea Follett	3,064	3.31	+1.09
Federation	Peter Power	1,468	1.59	+1.59
Total formal votes		92,556	97.24	+0.24
Informal votes		2,625	2.76	−0.24
Turnout		95,181	88.86	−2.06
Two-party-preferred result
Labor	Graham Perrett	54,690	59.09	+7.19
Liberal National	Steven Huang	37,866	40.91	−7.19
Labor hold		Swing	+7.19	

Alluvial diagram for preference flows in the seat of Moreton in the 2022 federal election. indicates at what stage the winning candidate had over 50% of the votes and was declared the winner.

=== Oxley ===
2022 Australian federal election: Oxley
Party	Candidate	Votes	%	±%
Labor	Milton Dick	43,785	45.89	+3.36
Liberal National	Kyle McMillen	27,385	28.70	−5.87
Greens	Asha Worsteling	13,595	14.25	+2.61
One Nation	Dylan Kozlowski	5,568	5.84	−0.46
United Australia	Timothy Coombes	5,079	5.32	+2.70
Total formal votes		95,412	96.38	+1.13
Informal votes		3,582	3.62	−1.13
Turnout		98,994	87.87	−3.33
Two-party-preferred result
Labor	Milton Dick	58,768	61.59	+5.20
Liberal National	Kyle McMillen	36,644	38.41	−5.20
Labor hold		Swing	+5.20	

Alluvial diagram for preference flows in the seat of Oxley in the 2022 federal election. indicates at what stage the winning candidate had over 50% of the votes and was declared the winner.

=== Petrie ===
2022 Australian federal election: Petrie
Party	Candidate	Votes	%	±%
Liberal National	Luke Howarth	46,325	43.49	−4.62
Labor	Mick Denton	31,972	30.02	−0.84
Greens	Will Simon	12,169	11.42	+2.68
United Australia	Kelly Guenoun	5,914	5.55	+2.24
One Nation	Marcus Mitchell	5,613	5.27	−2.25
Animal Justice	Chris Cicchitti	2,331	2.19	+2.19
Liberal Democrats	Anneke Wilson	2,189	2.06	+2.06
Total formal votes		106,513	96.46	+0.08
Informal votes		3,913	3.54	−0.08
Turnout		110,426	88.46	−2.84
Two-party-preferred result
Liberal National	Luke Howarth	57,981	54.44	−3.96
Labor	Mick Denton	48,532	45.56	+3.96
Liberal National hold		Swing	−3.96	

Alluvial diagram for preference flows in the seat of Petrie in the 2022 federal election. indicates at what stage the winning candidate had over 50% of the votes and was declared the winner.

=== Rankin ===
2022 Australian federal election: Rankin
Party	Candidate	Votes	%	±%
Labor	Jim Chalmers	38,596	43.95	+2.52
Liberal National	Paul Darwen	25,478	29.01	−2.34
Greens	Neil Cotter	9,394	10.70	+1.62
One Nation	Glen Cookson	7,006	7.98	−0.58
United Australia	Jeff Crank	5,064	5.77	+2.08
Animal Justice	Suzanne Clarke	2,284	2.60	+2.60
Total formal votes		87,822	96.11	+3.84
Informal votes		3,553	3.89	−3.84
Turnout		91,375	84.56	−4.26
Two-party-preferred result
Labor	Jim Chalmers	51,892	59.09	+2.65
Liberal National	Paul Darwen	35,930	40.91	−2.65
Labor hold		Swing	+2.65	

Alluvial diagram for preference flows in the seat of Rankin in the 2022 federal election. indicates at what stage the winning candidate had over 50% of the votes and was declared the winner.

=== Ryan ===
2022 Australian federal election: Ryan
Party	Candidate	Votes	%	±%
Liberal National	Julian Simmonds	38,239	38.50	−10.11
Greens	Elizabeth Watson-Brown	30,003	30.21	+9.86
Labor	Peter Cossar	22,146	22.30	−2.13
Liberal Democrats	Damian Coory	2,582	2.60	+2.60
One Nation	Joel Love	2,237	2.25	+0.09
United Australia	Kathryn Pollard	2,062	2.08	+0.55
Animal Justice	Jina Lipman	1,088	1.10	−0.82
Progressives	Janine Rees	606	0.61	+0.61
Federation	Axel Dancoisne	353	0.36	+0.36
Total formal votes		99,316	96.94	−0.66
Informal votes		3,140	3.06	+0.66
Turnout		102,456	92.04	−0.94
Notional two-party-preferred count
Labor	Peter Cossar	52,062	52.42	+8.45
Liberal National	Julian Simmonds	47,254	47.58	−8.45
Two-candidate-preferred result
Greens	Elizabeth Watson-Brown	52,286	52.65	+52.65
Liberal National	Julian Simmonds	47,030	47.35	−8.67
Greens gain from Liberal National				

Alluvial diagram for preference flows in the seat of Ryan in the 2022 federal election. indicates at what stage the winning candidate had over 50% of the votes and was declared the winner.

=== Wide Bay ===
2022 Australian federal election: Wide Bay
Party	Candidate	Votes	%	±%
Liberal National	Llew O'Brien	41,601	43.47	−3.62
Labor	Geoff Williams	20,345	21.26	−0.49
One Nation	Nathan Buckley	9,765	10.20	−0.63
Greens	Craig Armstrong	9,088	9.50	−0.44
United Australia	Tracy Bennett	4,406	4.60	+0.99
Independent	Kelli Jacobi	4,106	4.29	+4.29
Independent	Tim Jerome	2,737	2.86	−1.64
Informed Medical Options	Andrea Newland	2,097	2.19	+2.19
Australian Values	Daniel Williams	1,057	1.10	+1.10
Federation	John Woodward	501	0.52	+0.52
Total formal votes		95,703	93.58	−1.68
Informal votes		6,569	6.42	+1.68
Turnout		102,272	88.69	−2.98
Two-party-preferred result
Liberal National	Llew O'Brien	58,708	61.34	−1.81
Labor	Geoff Williams	36,995	38.66	+1.81
Liberal National hold		Swing	−1.81	

Alluvial diagram for preference flows in the seat of Wide Bay in the 2022 federal election. indicates at what stage the winning candidate had over 50% of the votes and was declared the winner.

=== Wright ===
2022 Australian federal election: Wright
Party	Candidate	Votes	%	±%
Liberal National	Scott Buchholz	45,753	43.19	−1.73
Labor	Pam McCreadie	22,643	21.37	+2.63
One Nation	Keith Hicks	15,095	14.25	+0.24
Greens	Nicole Thompson	12,107	11.43	+4.26
United Australia	Cassandra Duffill	8,703	8.22	+3.32
Federation	Shonna-Lee Banasiak	1,632	1.54	+1.54
Total formal votes		105,933	96.60	+2.68
Informal votes		3,733	3.40	−2.68
Turnout		109,666	88.59	−3.42
Two-party-preferred result
Liberal National	Scott Buchholz	64,506	60.89	−3.69
Labor	Pam McCreadie	41,427	39.11	+3.69
Liberal National hold		Swing	−3.69	

Alluvial diagram for preference flows in the seat of Wright in the 2022 federal election. indicates at what stage the winning candidate had over 50% of the votes and was declared the winner.

== Analysis ==
Unlike other states, the Coalition had a higher number of seats and a higher two-party-preferred vote (as well a higher first-preference vote) in Queensland than Labor. Queensland is a conservative state federally (despite having an incumbent Labor government) and Labor has only won Queensland's two-party-preferred vote in three of the 21 federal elections since 1949: 1951, 1990 and 2007. In 2007, the Labor Party had a leader from Queensland, Kevin Rudd. Labor did, however, increase both its first-preference vote and its two-party-preferred vote statewide.

While the LNP's primary vote decreased and Labor's slightly increased, Labor still had a lower primary vote in Queensland than any other state or territory except Tasmania.

The fact that the Coalition won more seats in Queensland than Labor is due to the fact that Queensland, unlike most other states, has more people outside its state capital (Brisbane) than inside it, despite Brisbane being by far the largest city in Queensland. The Coalition is dominant in regional Australia (particularly regional New South Wales and Queensland) and the outer-suburbs, while Labor is dominant in the inner-city.

Despite Queensland being generally more conservative than other states, the Greens managed to win three inner-city seats in Brisbane: two from the LNP (Brisbane and Ryan) and one from Labor (Griffith). However, these were the only seats that changed hands. Notably, there were also no teal independents that ran in any Queensland seats, unlike most other states (i.e. New South Wales, Victoria, Western Australia, Tasmania and the Australian Capital Territory).

Regional Queensland on the other hand remained unchanged. The LNP still holds every Queensland seat outside Brisbane except Kennedy, which is held by Bob Katter, the founder of the conservative Katter's Australian Party (KAP).

One Nation's vote, although decreased since the last election, was slightly higher than it was at the 2020 Queensland state election, at 7.49%.
