= Results of the 2025 Australian federal election in Queensland =

Federal election results in Queensland, Australia

2025 Australian federal election (Queensland)
- 3 May 2025

All 30 Queensland seats in the Australian House of Representatives and 6 seats in the Australian Senate
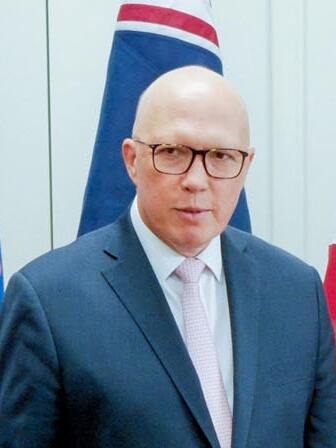

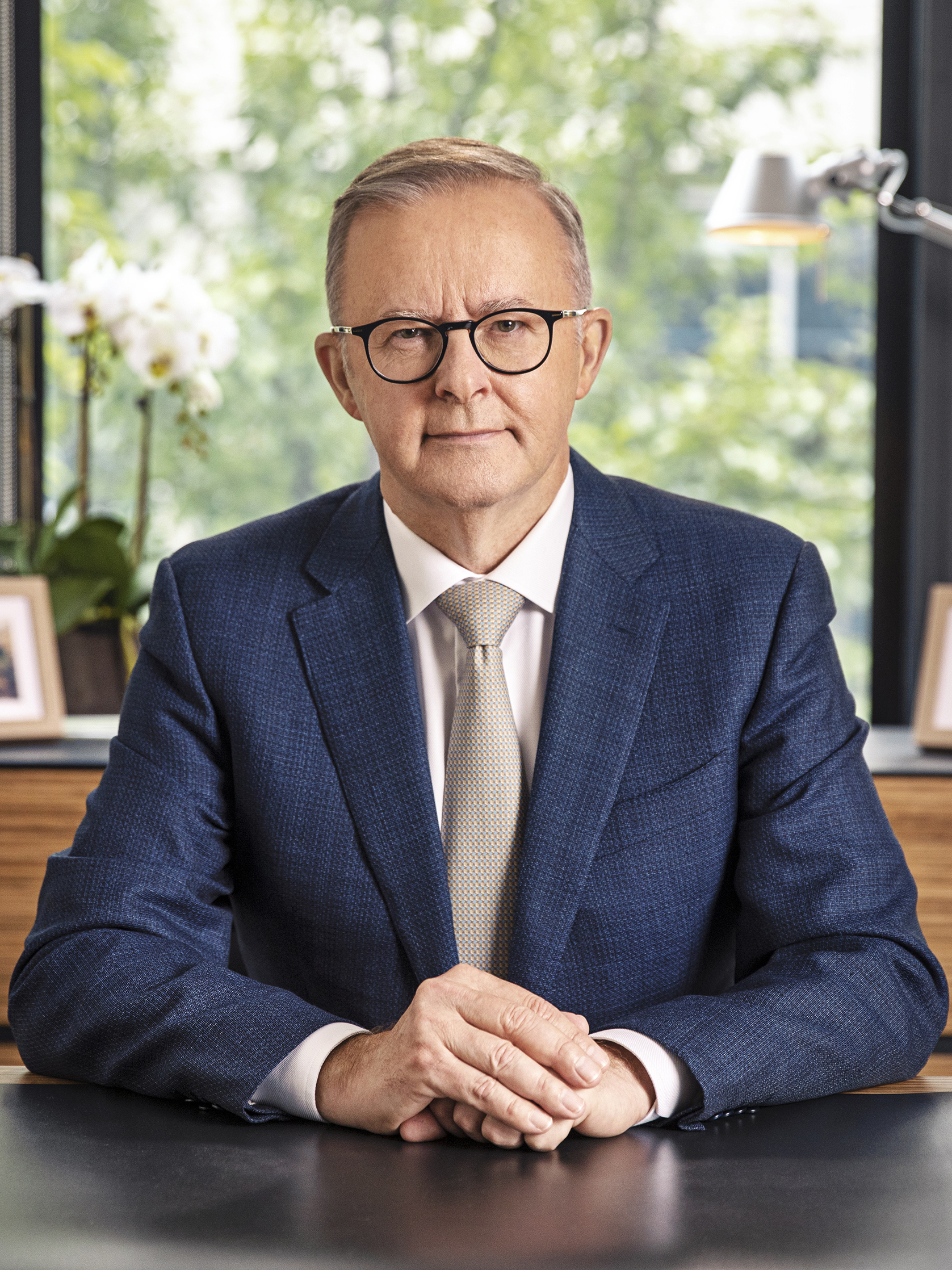

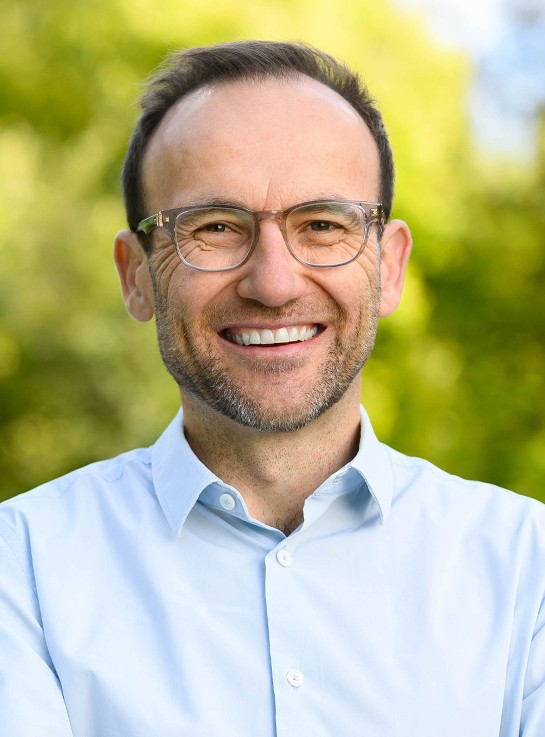

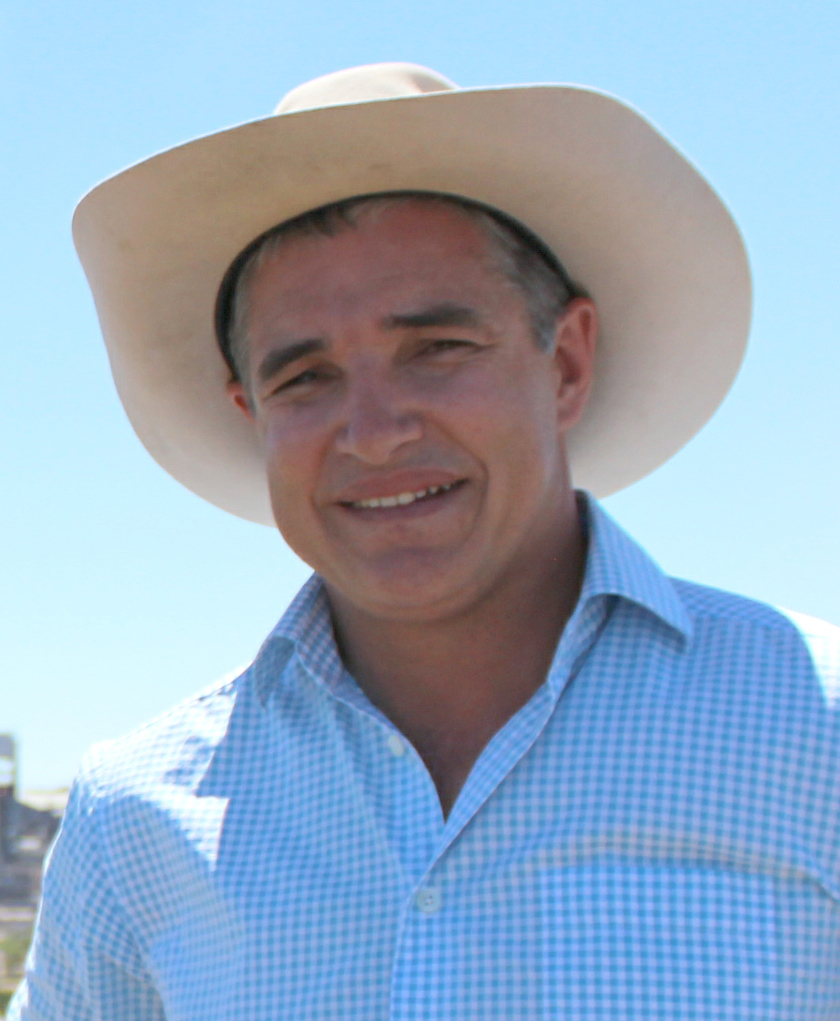
	First party	Second party
Leader	Peter Dutton	Anthony Albanese
Party	Liberal National	Labor
Last election	21 seats	5 seats
Seats won	16	12
Seat change	▼5	▲7
Primary vote	1,099,623	975,848
Percentage	34.91%	30.98%
Swing	▼4.73	▲3.56
TPP	50.58%	49.42%
TPP swing	▼3.47	▲3.47
	Third party	Fourth party
Leader	Adam Bandt	Robbie Katter
Party	Greens	Katter's Australian
Last election	3 seats	1 seat
Seats won	1	1
Seat change	▼2	Steady
Primary vote	370,313	51,775
Percentage	11.76%	1.64%
Swing	▼1.18	▼0.25
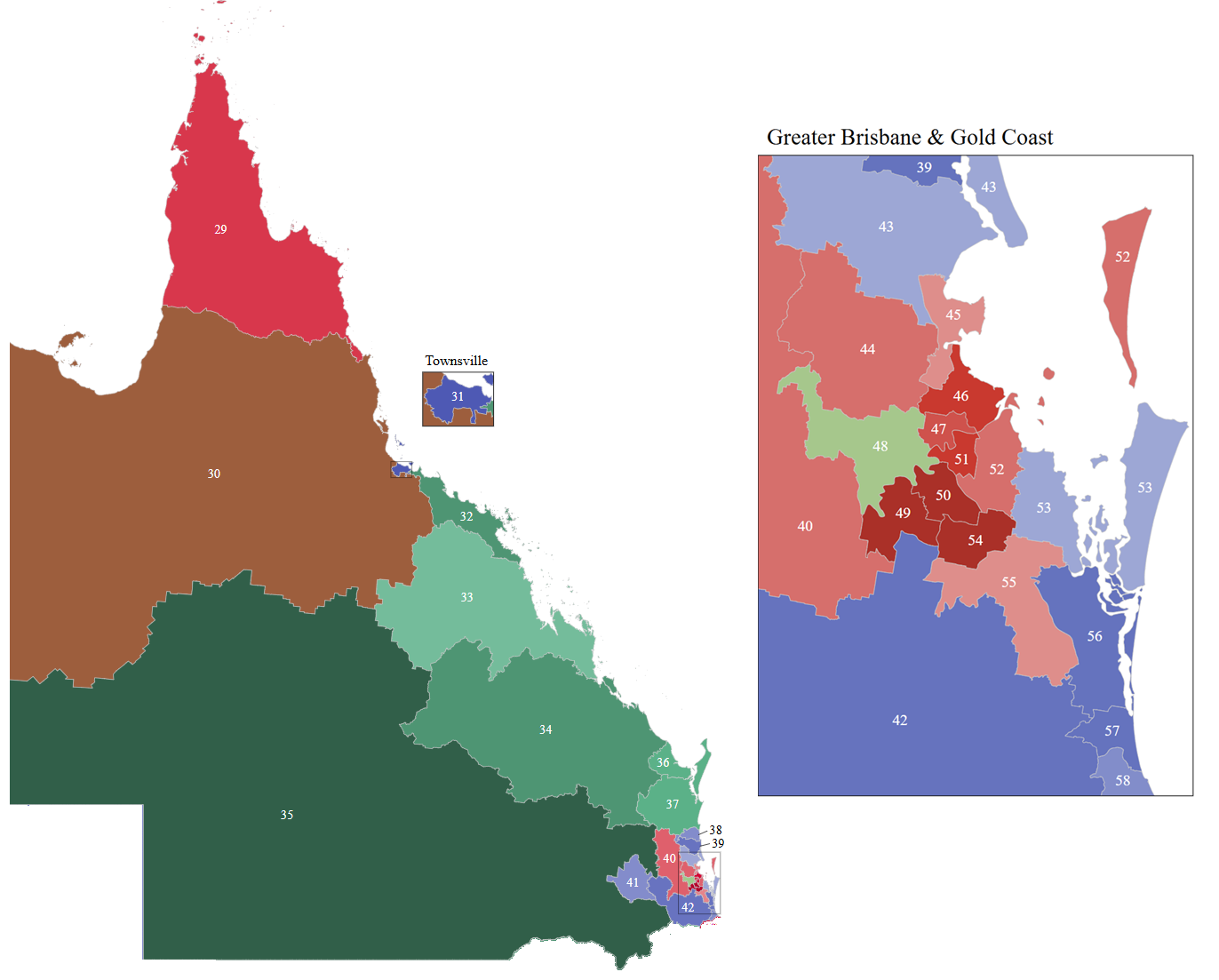

This is a list of electoral division results for the 2025 Australian federal election in the state of Queensland.

== Overall results ==
House of Representatives (IRV) – Turnout 88.66% (CV)
Party	Votes	%	Swing (pp)	Seats	Change (seats)
Liberal National	1,099,623	34.91	−4.73	16	▼5
Labor	975,848	30.98	+3.56	12	▲7
Greens	370,313	11.76	−1.18	1	▼2
One Nation	247,071	7.84	+0.35	0	Steady
Trumpet of Patriots	103,287	3.28	+3.00	0	Steady
Family First	83,560	2.65	+2.65	0	Steady
People First	60,471	1.92	+1.92	0	Steady
Katter's Australian	51,775	1.64	−0.25	1	Steady
Legalise Cannabis	18,910	0.60	+0.40	0	Steady
Libertarian	6,606	0.21	−0.76	0	Steady
Animal Justice	6,216	0.20	−0.64	0	Steady
Citizens	2,569	0.08	+0.08	0	Steady
Fusion	2,102	0.07	+0.04	0	Steady
Socialist Alliance	1,634	0.05	−0.08	0	Steady
Independent	118,221	3.75	+1.66	0	Steady
Not affiliated	1,435	0.05	+0.05	0	Steady
Total	3,149,641	100.00	–	30	Steady
Invalid/blank votes	163,467	4.93	+0.76	–	–
Turnout	3,313,108	88.66	+0.50	–	–
Registered voters	3,736,826	–	–	–	–
Two-party-preferred vote
Liberal National	1,593,135	50.58	−3.47		
Labor	1,556,506	49.42	+3.47		
Source: AEC

== Results by division ==
=== Blair ===
2025 Australian federal election: Blair
Party	Candidate	Votes	%	±%
Labor	Shayne Neumann	42,825	36.62	+1.61
Liberal National	Carl Mutzelburg	31,797	27.19	−1.70
Greens	Paul Toner	12,104	10.35	−2.23
One Nation	Brendan Kross	11,344	9.70	−0.29
Legalise Cannabis	Anthony Hopkins	5,353	4.58	+4.58
People First	Kathryn Chadwick	4,421	3.78	+3.78
Trumpet of Patriots	Edward McDonald	3,769	3.22	+3.22
Family First	John Purdon	2,334	2.00	+2.00
Animal Justice	Angela Lowery	1,874	1.60	−0.85
Libertarian	Anthony Bull	1,132	0.97	−1.98
Total formal votes		116,953	93.43	−1.27
Informal votes		8,219	6.57	+1.27
Turnout		125,172	88.15	+1.04
Two-party-preferred result
Labor	Shayne Neumann	65,156	55.71	+0.48
Liberal National	Carl Mutzelburg	51,797	44.29	−0.48
Labor hold		Swing	+0.48	

=== Bonner ===
2025 Australian federal election: Bonner
Party	Candidate	Votes	%	±%
Labor	Kara Cook	39,154	39.51	+9.95
Liberal National	Ross Vasta	35,156	35.47	−9.35
Greens	Wen Li	12,314	12.43	−4.32
One Nation	Christopher de Winter	3,784	3.82	−1.75
Family First	Ross Dovey	2,811	2.84	+2.84
Legalise Cannabis	Craig Hill	2,497	2.52	+2.52
Trumpet of Patriots	David Wright	2,187	2.21	+2.21
Libertarian	Shalini Bhasin	1,203	1.21	+1.21
Total formal votes		99,106	95.57	−1.93
Informal votes		4,597	4.43	+1.93
Turnout		103,703	91.37	+0.80
Two-party-preferred result
Labor	Kara Cook	54,506	55.00	+8.41
Liberal National	Ross Vasta	44,600	45.00	−8.41
Labor gain from Liberal National		Swing	+8.41	

=== Bowman ===
2025 Australian federal election: Bowman
Party	Candidate	Votes	%	±%
Liberal National	Henry Pike	42,777	39.61	−2.76
Labor	Darcy Brown	34,247	31.71	+2.51
Greens	Kristie Lockhart	12,689	11.75	−1.27
One Nation	Matthew Knight	7,650	7.08	−0.61
Trumpet of Patriots	Gary Williamson	3,924	3.63	+3.63
Independent	Shaun Holloway	3,375	3.13	+3.13
Family First	David Todd	3,325	3.08	+3.08
Total formal votes		107,987	96.44	−0.65
Informal votes		3,986	3.56	+0.65
Turnout		111,973	91.08	+0.57
Two-party-preferred result
Liberal National	Henry Pike	56,615	52.43	−3.08
Labor	Darcy Brown	51,372	47.57	+3.08
Liberal National hold		Swing	−3.08	

=== Brisbane ===
2025 Australian federal election: Brisbane
Party	Candidate	Votes	%	±%
Liberal National	Trevor Evans	37,951	34.27	−3.44
Labor	Madonna Jarrett	35,607	32.15	+4.90
Greens	Stephen Bates	28,663	25.88	−1.36
One Nation	Cheryl Wood	2,798	2.53	+0.30
People First	Joseph Wheeler	2,354	2.13	+2.13
Trumpet of Patriots	Brian Thiele	1,398	1.26	+1.26
Fusion	Rachael Blackwood	1,095	0.99	+0.99
Family First	Kirsten Sands	879	0.79	+0.79
Total formal votes		110,745	96.81	−1.11
Informal votes		3,645	3.19	+1.11
Turnout		114,390	89.71	+0.97
Two-party-preferred result
Labor	Madonna Jarrett	65,295	58.96	+4.56
Liberal National	Trevor Evans	45,450	41.04	−4.56
Labor gain from Greens		Swing	+4.56	

=== Capricornia ===
2025 Australian federal election: Capricornia
Party	Candidate	Votes	%	±%
Liberal National	Michelle Landry	36,074	36.56	−2.88
Labor	Emily Mawson	31,483	31.91	+3.86
One Nation	Cheryl Kempton	15,355	15.56	+0.96
Greens	Mick Jones	6,101	6.18	+0.31
Trumpet of Patriots	Stephen Andrew	5,999	6.08	+6.08
Family First	Kerri Hislop	3,646	3.70	+3.70
Total formal votes		98,658	96.53	+2.67
Informal votes		3,547	3.47	−2.67
Turnout		102,205	88.77	+0.17
Two-party-preferred result
Liberal National	Michelle Landry	55,085	55.83	−0.76
Labor	Emily Mawson	43,573	44.17	+0.76
Liberal National hold		Swing	−0.76	

=== Dawson ===
2025 Australian federal election: Dawson
Party	Candidate	Votes	%	±%
Liberal National	Andrew Willcox	41,043	41.68	−1.65
Labor	Neil Wallace	25,808	26.21	+1.74
One Nation	Darren Brown	10,258	10.42	−2.85
Greens	Paula Creen	6,944	7.05	−0.16
Trumpet of Patriots	Michael Lockyer	5,673	5.76	+5.76
People First	Alexander Beaumont	5,572	5.66	+5.66
Family First	Amanda Nickson	3,170	3.22	+3.22
Total formal votes		98,468	95.31	−0.55
Informal votes		4,849	4.69	+0.55
Turnout		103,317	88.15	+0.66
Two-party-preferred result
Liberal National	Andrew Willcox	60,881	61.83	+1.41
Labor	Neil Wallace	37,587	38.17	−1.41
Liberal National hold		Swing	+1.41	

=== Dickson ===
2025 Australian federal election: Dickson
Party	Candidate	Votes	%	±%
Liberal National	Peter Dutton	36,628	34.69	−7.38
Labor	Ali France	35,502	33.63	+1.93
Independent	Ellie Smith	12,874	12.19	+12.19
Greens	Vinnie Batten	8,061	7.64	−5.36
One Nation	Joel Stevenson	4,429	4.19	−1.17
Legalise Cannabis	David Zaloudek	2,950	2.79	+2.79
Family First	Suniti Hewett	2,299	2.18	+2.18
Trumpet of Patriots	Michael Jessop	1,900	1.80	+1.80
Animal Justice	Maureen Brohman	936	0.89	+0.89
Total formal votes		105,579	95.76	−0.36
Informal votes		4,676	4.24	+0.36
Turnout		110,255	92.36	+1.01
Two-party-preferred result
Labor	Ali France	59,115	55.99	+7.69
Liberal National	Peter Dutton	46,464	44.01	−7.69
Labor gain from Liberal National		Swing	+7.69	

=== Fadden ===
2025 Australian federal election: Fadden
Party	Candidate	Votes	%	±%
Liberal National	Cameron Caldwell	45,627	40.96	−3.66
Labor	Letitia Del Fabbro	30,526	27.40	+5.05
Greens	Andrew Stimson	10,359	9.30	−1.43
One Nation	Nick Muir	8,896	7.99	−0.69
People First	John Armfield	4,938	4.43	+4.43
Trumpet of Patriots	Nathan O'Brien	4,561	4.09	+4.09
Independent	Stewart Brooker	3,124	2.80	−1.37
Family First	Patricia Martin	2,198	1.97	+1.97
Citizens	Dennis Pukallus	1,169	1.05	+1.05
Total formal votes		111,398	94.25	−1.44
Informal votes		6,793	5.75	+1.44
Turnout		118,191	87.08	+0.54
Two-party-preferred result
Liberal National	Cameron Caldwell	63,364	56.88	−3.75
Labor	Letitia Del Fabbro	48,034	43.12	+3.75
Liberal National hold		Swing	−3.75	

=== Fairfax ===
2025 Australian federal election: Fairfax
Party	Candidate	Votes	%	±%
Liberal National	Ted O'Brien	42,075	37.89	−7.02
Labor	Naomi McQueen	27,607	24.86	+3.00
Independent	Francine Wiig	13,085	11.78	+11.78
Greens	Sue Etheridge	11,351	10.22	−3.15
One Nation	Beatrice Marsh	8,232	7.41	+0.85
Family First	Rhys Sanderson	3,816	3.44	+3.44
Trumpet of Patriots	Gregory Ryzy	3,063	2.76	+2.76
Independent	Paul McKeown	1,819	1.64	+1.64
Total formal votes		111,048	94.73	+0.26
Informal votes		6,180	5.27	−0.26
Turnout		117,228	89.72	+0.73
Two-party-preferred result
Liberal National	Ted O'Brien	59,110	53.23	−5.72
Labor	Naomi McQueen	51,938	46.77	+5.72
Liberal National hold		Swing	−5.72	

=== Fisher ===
2025 Australian federal election: Fisher
Party	Candidate	Votes	%	±%
Liberal National	Andrew Wallace	44,100	37.22	−7.03
Labor	Morrison Lakey	26,380	22.27	−1.06
Independent	Keryn Jones	19,296	16.29	+16.29
Greens	Renay Wells	11,396	9.62	−4.19
One Nation	Benjamin Kelly	7,199	6.08	−3.23
People First	James Pidgeon	4,972	4.20	+4.20
Trumpet of Patriots	Denis Fricot	3,050	2.57	+2.57
Family First	Bronwen Bolitho	2,079	1.75	+1.75
Total formal votes		118,472	94.57	−2.28
Informal votes		6,798	5.43	+2.28
Turnout		125,270	90.08	+1.01
Two-party-preferred result
Liberal National	Andrew Wallace	66,385	56.03	−2.64
Labor	Morrison Lakey	52,087	43.97	+2.64
Liberal National hold		Swing	−2.64	

=== Flynn ===
2025 Australian federal election: Flynn
Party	Candidate	Votes	%	±%
Liberal National	Colin Boyce	36,502	37.42	+0.54
Labor	Helen Madell	24,441	25.06	−8.47
One Nation	David Harris	13,874	14.22	+1.99
People First	Lance Price	6,180	6.34	+6.34
Greens	Paul Bambrick	5,547	5.69	+1.35
Trumpet of Patriots	Peter Zunker	3,720	3.81	+3.81
Independent	John Anderson	3,130	3.21	+3.21
Family First	Peter Dorian	2,408	2.47	+2.47
Independent	Duncan Scott	1,741	1.78	−2.28
Total formal votes		97,543	93.33	−2.84
Informal votes		6,970	6.67	+2.84
Turnout		104,513	88.64	+0.57
Two-party-preferred result
Liberal National	Colin Boyce	58,762	60.24	+6.42
Labor	Helen Madell	38,781	39.76	−6.42
Liberal National hold		Swing	+6.42	

=== Forde ===
2025 Australian federal election: Forde
Party	Candidate	Votes	%	±%
Labor	Rowan Holzberger	36,821	34.24	+6.23
Liberal National	Bert van Manen	33,023	30.71	−6.20
Greens	Kirsty Petersen	12,280	11.42	+1.57
One Nation	Matthew Lambert	11,049	10.28	+2.27
Family First	Corneliu Pop	5,459	5.08	+5.08
Trumpet of Patriots	Jacob Hiscock	5,041	4.69	+4.69
Independent	Chris Greaves	3,186	2.96	−0.18
Citizens	Alf de Hombre	669	0.62	+0.62
Total formal votes		107,528	93.53	+0.31
Informal votes		7,440	6.47	−0.31
Turnout		114,968	85.79	+0.56
Two-party-preferred result
Labor	Rowan Holzberger	55,662	51.77	+6.00
Liberal National	Bert van Manen	51,866	48.23	−6.00
Labor gain from Liberal National		Swing	+6.00	

=== Griffith ===
2025 Australian federal election: Griffith
Party	Candidate	Votes	%	±%
Labor	Renee Coffey	37,686	34.51	+5.57
Greens	Max Chandler-Mather	34,570	31.65	−2.94
Liberal National	Anthony Bishop	29,025	26.58	−4.16
One Nation	Lindsay Bell	2,684	2.46	−0.84
People First	Dion Hunt	2,528	2.31	+2.31
Trumpet of Patriots	Aaron Hayes	1,659	1.52	+1.52
Family First	Andrea Campbell	1,060	0.97	+0.97
Total formal votes		109,212	97.80	−0.20
Informal votes		2,454	2.20	+0.20
Turnout		111,666	90.11	+0.66
Notional two-party-preferred count
Labor	Renee Coffey	72,015	65.94	+4.87
Liberal National	Anthony Bishop	37,197	34.06	−4.87
Two-candidate-preferred result
Labor	Renee Coffey	66,154	60.57	+60.57
Greens	Max Chandler-Mather	43,058	39.43	−21.03
Labor gain from Greens				

=== Groom ===
2025 Australian federal election: Groom
Party	Candidate	Votes	%	±%
Liberal National	Garth Hamilton	42,302	40.98	−2.74
Independent	Suzie Holt	17,694	17.14	+8.88
Labor	Richard Edwards	17,172	16.64	−2.09
One Nation	Rebecca Konz	9,860	9.55	−0.01
Greens	Alyce Nelligan	5,757	5.58	−0.27
Family First	Alexandra Todd	3,894	3.77	+3.77
Independent	Kirstie Smolenski	3,701	3.59	−3.55
Trumpet of Patriots	Jamie Marr	2,839	2.75	+1.15
Total formal votes		103,219	95.14	−0.14
Informal votes		5,276	4.86	+0.14
Turnout		108,495	91.17	+0.29
Notional two-party-preferred count
Liberal National	Garth Hamilton	65,390	63.35	−0.82
Labor	Richard Edwards	37,829	36.65	+0.82
Two-candidate-preferred result
Liberal National	Garth Hamilton	57,467	55.67	−1.22
Independent	Suzie Holt	45,752	44.33	+1.22
Liberal National hold		Swing	−1.22	

=== Herbert ===
2025 Australian federal election: Herbert
Party	Candidate	Votes	%	±%
Liberal National	Phillip Thompson	47,941	48.74	+1.73
Labor	Edwina Andrew	22,646	23.02	+1.42
Greens	Chris Evans	9,228	9.38	+1.16
Katter's Australian	Darryn Casson	6,559	6.67	−0.33
One Nation	Ross Macdonald	5,100	5.18	−0.09
People First	Felicity Cole	3,255	3.31	+3.31
Trumpet of Patriots	Martin Brewster	2,173	2.21	+2.21
Family First	Felicity Roser	1,460	1.48	+1.48
Total formal votes		98,362	94.89	+0.66
Informal votes		5,300	5.11	−0.66
Turnout		103,662	85.47	−0.46
Two-party-preferred result
Liberal National	Phillip Thompson	62,374	63.41	+1.64
Labor	Edwina Andrew	35,988	36.59	−1.64
Liberal National hold		Swing	+1.64	

=== Hinkler ===
2025 Australian federal election: Hinkler
Party	Candidate	Votes	%	±%
Liberal National	David Batt	41,569	38.01	−4.12
Labor	Trish Mears	34,104	31.18	+7.87
One Nation	Tyler Carman	14,498	13.26	+4.55
Greens	Andrew McLean	8,000	7.31	+1.83
Trumpet of Patriots	Robert Blohberger	4,220	3.86	+3.86
Family First	Kerry Petrus	3,778	3.45	+3.45
Independent	Michael O'Brien	3,201	2.93	+2.93
Total formal votes		109,370	95.37	−1.36
Informal votes		5,307	4.63	+1.36
Turnout		114,677	89.80	+0.31
Two-party-preferred result
Liberal National	David Batt	61,534	56.26	−3.81
Labor	Trish Mears	47,836	43.74	+3.81
Liberal National hold		Swing	−3.81	

=== Kennedy ===
2025 Australian federal election: Kennedy
Party	Candidate	Votes	%	±%
Katter's Australian	Bob Katter	39,219	40.36	−1.34
Liberal National	Annette Swaine	23,135	23.81	−4.38
Labor	Sharon Winn	15,917	16.38	+0.32
One Nation	Kate Harris	7,541	7.76	+7.76
Greens	Carole Stanford	5,761	5.93	−0.49
Trumpet of Patriots	Mark Westcott	2,283	2.35	+2.35
Family First	Douglas Lush	1,681	1.73	+1.73
Independent	Steven Clare	1,625	1.67	+1.67
Total formal votes		97,162	93.77	−2.95
Informal votes		6,460	6.23	+2.95
Turnout		103,622	83.77	−0.82
Notional two-party-preferred count
Liberal National	Annette Swaine	57,641	59.32	−0.84
Labor	Sharon Winn	39,521	40.68	+0.84
Two-candidate-preferred result
Katter's Australian	Bob Katter	63,888	65.75	+2.65
Liberal National	Annette Swaine	33,274	34.25	−2.65
Katter's Australian hold		Swing	+2.65	

=== Leichhardt ===
2025 Australian federal election: Leichhardt
Party	Candidate	Votes	%	±%
Labor	Matt Smith	34,488	36.50	+8.90
Liberal National	Jeremy Neal	25,746	27.25	−9.45
Greens	Phillip Musumeci	8,776	9.29	−0.68
One Nation	Robert Hicks	7,568	8.01	+0.57
Katter's Australian	Daniel Collins	5,997	6.35	+0.72
Legalise Cannabis	Nicholas Daniels	5,359	5.67	+5.67
Trumpet of Patriots	Greg Dowling	2,149	2.27	+1.76
Family First	Les Searle	1,796	1.90	+1.90
Independent	Norman Miller	1,659	1.76	+1.76
Libertarian	Lloyd Russell	942	1.00	+1.00
Total formal votes		94,480	92.76	−0.42
Informal votes		7,372	7.24	+0.42
Turnout		101,852	82.97	−1.00
Two-party-preferred result
Labor	Matt Smith	52,967	56.06	+9.50
Liberal National	Jeremy Neal	41,513	43.94	−9.50
Labor gain from Liberal National		Swing	+9.50	

=== Lilley ===
2025 Australian federal election: Lilley
Party	Candidate	Votes	%	±%
Labor	Anika Wells	48,582	46.08	+4.24
Liberal National	Kimberley Washington	29,205	27.70	−2.13
Greens	Melissa Stevens	17,294	16.40	−0.69
One Nation	Michelle McKay	4,485	4.25	+0.18
Trumpet of Patriots	Joshua Morrison	3,128	2.97	+2.97
Family First	Alan Denaro	2,746	2.60	+2.60
Total formal votes		105,440	97.63	+0.33
Informal votes		2,555	2.37	−0.33
Turnout		107,995	91.06	+0.45
Two-party-preferred result
Labor	Anika Wells	68,030	64.52	+3.98
Liberal National	Kimberley Washington	37,410	35.48	−3.98
Labor hold		Swing	+3.98	

=== Longman ===
2025 Australian federal election: Longman
Party	Candidate	Votes	%	±%
Liberal National	Terry Young	43,960	36.05	−2.12
Labor	Rhiannyn Douglas	43,238	35.46	+3.96
One Nation	Peter McCasker	12,062	9.89	+1.64
Greens	Gabrielle Unverzagt	12,014	9.85	+2.62
Trumpet of Patriots	Benjamin Wood	5,985	4.91	+4.91
Family First	Malachi Hearne (disendorsed)	4,670	3.83	+3.83
Total formal votes		121,929	96.06	+1.05
Informal votes		4,998	3.94	−1.05
Turnout		126,927	88.92	+0.75
Two-party-preferred result
Liberal National	Terry Young	61,099	50.11	−2.97
Labor	Rhiannyn Douglas	60,830	49.89	+2.97
Liberal National hold		Swing	−2.97	

=== Maranoa ===
2025 Australian federal election: Maranoa
Party	Candidate	Votes	%	±%
Liberal National	David Littleproud	51,947	53.18	−3.08
Labor	Alex Newman	15,675	16.05	+0.76
One Nation	Sharon Duncan	12,018	12.30	+0.41
People First	Rod Draper	5,552	5.68	+5.68
Greens	Elizabeth Johnston	5,032	5.15	+0.28
Family First	John Matthew Whittle	2,802	2.87	+2.87
Trumpet of Patriots	Jonathan Allen Cumes	2,764	2.83	+1.76
Libertarian	Michael Offerdahl	1,897	1.94	+1.94
Total formal votes		97,687	94.57	−2.07
Informal votes		5,606	5.43	+2.07
Turnout		103,293	89.42	+1.03
Notional two-party-preferred count
Liberal National	David Littleproud	72,253	73.96	+1.84
Labor	Alex Newman	25,434	26.04	−1.84
Two-candidate-preferred result
Liberal National	David Littleproud	68,476	70.10	−2.02
One Nation	Sharon Duncan	29,211	29.90	+29.90
Liberal National hold				

=== McPherson ===
2025 Australian federal election: McPherson
Party	Candidate	Votes	%	±%
Liberal National	Leon Rebello	34,918	35.92	−7.64
Labor	Alice Price	22,778	23.43	+1.43
Independent	Erchana Murray-Bartlett	13,366	13.75	+13.75
Greens	Amanda Kennealy	8,175	8.41	−7.01
One Nation	Zyion Attiig	4,229	4.35	−2.87
People First	Harry Hatzikalimnios	3,158	3.25	+3.25
Legalise Cannabis	Jeff Knipe	2,751	2.83	+2.83
Trumpet of Patriots	Max Creswick	2,681	2.76	+2.15
Libertarian	Gary Biggs	1,432	1.47	−0.65
Family First	Neena Tester	1,366	1.41	+1.41
Independent	Michelle Faye	1,221	1.26	+1.26
Animal Justice	Jennifer Horsburgh	1,140	1.17	+1.17
Total formal votes		97,215	91.55	−3.03
Informal votes		8,968	8.45	+3.03
Turnout		106,183	87.36	−0.20
Two-party-preferred result
Liberal National	Leon Rebello	52,920	54.44	−4.90
Labor	Alice Price	44,295	45.56	+4.90
Liberal National hold		Swing	−4.90	

=== Moncrieff ===
2025 Australian federal election: Moncrieff
Party	Candidate	Votes	%	±%
Liberal National	Angie Bell	42,047	41.91	−4.03
Labor	Blair Stuart	24,536	24.46	+3.65
Greens	Sally Spain	9,558	9.53	−2.54
Independent	Nicole Arrowsmith	7,641	7.62	+7.62
One Nation	Glen Wadsworth	5,894	5.87	−1.24
Trumpet of Patriots	Vic Naicker	4,065	4.05	+3.39
People First	Natasha Szorkovszky	3,547	3.54	+3.54
Family First	Ruth Fea	1,645	1.64	+1.64
Independent	Waddah Weld Ali	1,393	1.39	+1.39
Total formal votes		100,326	93.16	−1.06
Informal votes		7,362	6.84	+1.06
Turnout		107,688	85.66	+0.63
Two-party-preferred result
Liberal National	Angie Bell	58,991	58.80	−2.39
Labor	Blair Stuart	41,335	41.20	+2.39
Liberal National hold		Swing	−2.39	

=== Moreton ===
2025 Australian federal election: Moreton
Party	Candidate	Votes	%	±%
Labor	Julie-Ann Campbell	39,697	42.31	+4.89
Liberal National	Henry Swindon	24,132	25.72	−7.53
Greens	Remah Naji	20,332	21.67	+0.87
One Nation	Grant Spork	2,686	2.86	−0.77
Trumpet of Patriots	Christian Julius	2,328	2.48	+0.89
People First	Natarsha Billing	2,243	2.39	+2.39
Family First	Melinda Keller	1,682	1.79	+1.79
Citizens	Max Hooper	731	0.78	+0.78
Total formal votes		93,831	95.68	−1.56
Informal votes		4,232	4.32	+1.56
Turnout		98,063	89.75	+0.89
Two-party-preferred result
Labor	Julie-Ann Campbell	62,014	66.09	+7.00
Liberal National	Henry Swindon	31,817	33.91	−7.00
Labor hold		Swing	+7.00	

=== Oxley ===
2025 Australian federal election: Oxley
Party	Candidate	Votes	%	±%
Labor	Milton Dick	54,891	52.75	+6.86
Liberal National	Kevin Burns	21,976	21.12	−7.58
Greens	Brandan Holt	13,979	13.43	−0.82
One Nation	Darren Baker	5,738	5.51	−0.33
Family First	William Tento	3,058	2.94	+2.94
Trumpet of Patriots	Mark Maguire	2,985	2.87	+2.87
Unregistered SEP	Mike Head	1,435	1.38	+1.38
Total formal votes		104,062	96.18	−0.20
Informal votes		4,128	3.82	+0.20
Turnout		108,190	88.36	+0.49
Two-party-preferred result
Labor	Milton Dick	72,003	69.19	+7.60
Liberal National	Kevin Burns	32,059	30.81	−7.60
Labor hold		Swing	+7.60	

=== Petrie ===
2025 Australian federal election: Petrie
Party	Candidate	Votes	%	±%
Liberal National	Luke Howarth	44,196	37.84	−5.65
Labor	Emma Comer	42,538	36.42	+6.40
Greens	Nikil Paul	13,802	11.82	+0.40
One Nation	Nicole Shires	7,848	6.72	+1.45
Trumpet of Patriots	Ryan Mensink	4,685	4.01	+4.01
Family First	Sharan Hall	3,723	3.19	+3.19
Total formal votes		116,792	96.89	+0.43
Informal votes		3,746	3.11	−0.43
Turnout		120,538	89.71	+1.25
Two-party-preferred result
Labor	Emma Comer	59,761	51.17	+5.61
Liberal National	Luke Howarth	57,031	48.83	−5.61
Labor gain from Liberal National		Swing	+5.61	

=== Rankin ===
2025 Australian federal election: Rankin
Party	Candidate	Votes	%	±%
Labor	Jim Chalmers	45,303	49.42	+5.47
Liberal National	Paul Darwen	18,101	19.75	−9.26
Greens	Joshua Riethmuller	10,032	10.94	+0.24
One Nation	Kyle Lentz	6,021	6.57	−1.41
Family First	Carol Ordish	3,862	4.21	+4.21
People First	Lana Hudson	3,416	3.73	+3.73
Trumpet of Patriots	Janet Lindbom	3,300	3.60	+3.60
Socialist Alliance	Alex Bainbridge	1,634	1.78	+1.78
Total formal votes		91,669	93.57	−2.54
Informal votes		6,304	6.43	+2.54
Turnout		97,973	85.23	+0.67
Two-party-preferred result
Labor	Jim Chalmers	60,092	65.55	+6.46
Liberal National	Paul Darwen	31,577	34.45	−6.46
Labor hold		Swing	+6.46	

=== Ryan ===
2025 Australian federal election: Ryan
Party	Candidate	Votes	%	±%
Liberal National	Maggie Forrest	35,806	34.61	−3.89
Greens	Elizabeth Watson-Brown	29,986	28.98	−1.23
Labor	Rebecca Hack	29,217	28.24	+5.94
People First	Nicole de Lapp	2,407	2.33	+2.33
One Nation	Robbie Elsom	2,327	2.25	+0.00
Trumpet of Patriots	Ryan Hunt	1,372	1.33	+0.97
Family First	Donna Gallehawk	1,340	1.30	+1.30
Fusion	Gina Masterton	1,007	0.97	+0.97
Total formal votes		103,462	97.06	+0.12
Informal votes		3,136	2.94	−0.12
Turnout		106,598	92.81	+0.77
Notional two-party-preferred count
Labor	Rebecca Hack	59,822	57.82	+5.40
Liberal National	Maggie Forrest	43,640	42.18	−5.40
Two-candidate-preferred result
Greens	Elizabeth Watson-Brown	55,112	53.27	+0.62
Liberal National	Maggie Forrest	48,350	46.73	−0.62
Greens hold		Swing	+0.62	

=== Wide Bay ===
2025 Australian federal election: Wide Bay
Party	Candidate	Votes	%	±%
Liberal National	Llew O'Brien	41,055	39.08	−4.39
Labor	Elliott Chalmers	27,271	25.96	+4.70
One Nation	Chad Burgess	12,646	12.04	+1.84
Greens	Emma Buhse	9,080	8.64	−0.86
Family First	Kirsti Kenningale	5,394	5.13	+5.13
Independent	Casey Iddon	5,090	4.84	+4.84
Trumpet of Patriots	Gabrial Pennicott	4,522	4.30	+3.78
Total formal votes		105,058	95.54	+1.96
Informal votes		4,908	4.46	−1.96
Turnout		109,966	89.29	+0.60
Two-party-preferred result
Liberal National	Llew O'Brien	60,546	57.63	−3.71
Labor	Elliott Chalmers	44,512	42.37	+3.71
Liberal National hold		Swing	−3.71	

=== Wright ===
2025 Australian federal election: Wright
Party	Candidate	Votes	%	±%
Liberal National	Scott Buchholz	39,809	34.06	−9.13
Labor	Pam McCreadie	29,708	25.42	+4.05
One Nation	Natalie Davis	18,998	16.25	+2.00
Greens	Nicole Thompson	11,128	9.52	−1.91
People First	Justin McGuiness	5,928	5.07	+5.07
Trumpet of Patriots	Scott Thompson	5,864	5.02	+3.48
Family First	Julie Rose	3,179	2.72	+2.72
Animal Justice	Chloe Snyman	2,266	1.94	+1.94
Total formal votes		116,880	93.85	−2.75
Informal votes		7,655	6.15	+2.75
Turnout		124,535	88.77	+0.18
Two-party-preferred result
Liberal National	Scott Buchholz	67,764	57.98	−2.91
Labor	Pam McCreadie	49,116	42.02	+2.91
Liberal National hold		Swing	−2.91	
