= Electoral results for the Division of Brisbane =

Australian division election results

This is a list of electoral results for the Division of Brisbane in Australian federal elections from the division's creation in 1901 until the present.

== Members ==
Member	Party	Term
Thomas Macdonald-Paterson	Protectionist	1901–1903
Thomas Macdonald-Paterson	Independent	1903–1903
Millice Culpin	Labour	1903–1906
Justin Foxton	Anti-Socialist	1906–1909
Justin Foxton	Liberal	1909–1910
William Finlayson	Labor	1910–1919
Donald Cameron	Nationalist	1919–1931
George Lawson	Labor	1931–1961
Manfred Cross	Labor	1961–1975
Peter Johnson	Liberal	1975–1980
Manfred Cross	Labor	1980–1990
Arch Bevis	Labor	1990–2010
Teresa Gambaro	Liberal National	2010–2016
Trevor Evans	Liberal National	2016–2022
Stephen Bates	Greens	2022–2025
Madonna Jarrett	Labor	2025–present

== Election results ==
=== Elections in the 2020s ===
==== 2025 ====
2025 Australian federal election: Brisbane
Party	Candidate	Votes	%	±%
Liberal National	Trevor Evans	37,951	34.27	−3.44
Labor	Madonna Jarrett	35,607	32.15	+4.90
Greens	Stephen Bates	28,663	25.88	−1.36
One Nation	Cheryl Wood	2,798	2.53	+0.30
People First	Joseph Wheeler	2,354	2.13	+2.13
Trumpet of Patriots	Brian Thiele	1,398	1.26	+1.26
Fusion	Rachael Blackwood	1,095	0.99	+0.99
Family First	Kirsten Sands	879	0.79	+0.79
Total formal votes		110,745	96.81	−1.11
Informal votes		3,645	3.19	+1.11
Turnout		114,390	89.70	+0.96
Two-party-preferred result
Labor	Madonna Jarrett	65,295	58.96	+58.96
Liberal National	Trevor Evans	45,450	41.04	−5.23
Labor gain from Greens				

Results are not final. Last updated on 24 May 2025 at 1:00 AM AEST.

==== 2022 ====
2022 Australian federal election: Brisbane
Party	Candidate	Votes	%	±%
Liberal National	Trevor Evans	41,032	37.71	−10.13
Labor	Madonna Jarrett	29,652	27.25	+2.76
Greens	Stephen Bates	29,641	27.24	+4.87
One Nation	Trevor Hold	2,429	2.23	−0.26
Animal Justice	Tiana Kennedy	2,135	1.96	+1.96
United Australia	Justin Knudson	2,102	1.93	+0.54
Liberal Democrats	Anthony Bull	1,807	1.66	+1.66
Total formal votes		108,798	97.92	+0.44
Informal votes		2,312	2.08	−0.44
Turnout		111,110	88.74	−1.77
Notional two-party-preferred count
Labor	Madonna Jarrett	59,183	54.40	+9.32
Liberal National	Trevor Evans	49,615	45.60	−9.32
Two-candidate-preferred result
Greens	Stephen Bates	58,460	53.73	+53.73
Liberal National	Trevor Evans	50,338	46.27	−8.65
Greens gain from Liberal National				

Alluvial diagram for preference flows in the seat of Brisbane in the 2022 federal election. indicates at what stage the winning candidate had over 50% of the votes and was declared the winner.

=== Elections in the 2010s ===
==== 2019 ====
2019 Australian federal election: Brisbane
Party	Candidate	Votes	%	±%
Liberal National	Trevor Evans	48,777	47.84	−2.09
Labor	Paul Newbury	24,970	24.49	−1.42
Greens	Andrew Bartlett	22,807	22.37	+2.94
One Nation	Anne Perry	2,537	2.49	+2.49
United Australia	Aaron Whittaker	1,420	1.39	+1.39
Conservative National	Rod Jeanneret	732	0.72	+0.72
Socialist Alliance	Kamala Emanuel	714	0.70	+0.70
Total formal votes		101,957	97.48	−0.14
Informal votes		2,631	2.52	+0.14
Turnout		104,588	90.51	+0.67
Two-party-preferred result
Liberal National	Trevor Evans	55,995	54.92	−1.08
Labor	Paul Newbury	45,962	45.08	+1.08
Liberal National hold		Swing	−1.08	

==== 2016 ====
2016 Australian federal election: Brisbane
Party	Candidate	Votes	%	±%
Liberal National	Trevor Evans	46,972	49.85	+1.86
Labor	Pat O'Neill	24,500	26.00	−4.12
Greens	Kirsten Lovejoy	18,279	19.40	+5.06
Liberal Democrats	John Humphreys	1,962	2.08	+2.08
Family First	Mark Vegar	1,597	1.69	+0.77
Defence Veterans	Bridget Clinch	915	0.97	+0.97
Total formal votes		94,225	97.61	+1.49
Informal votes		2,304	2.39	−1.49
Turnout		96,529	90.21	−2.52
Two-party-preferred result
Liberal National	Trevor Evans	52,693	55.92	+1.64
Labor	Pat O'Neill	41,532	44.08	−1.64
Liberal National hold		Swing	+1.64	

==== 2013 ====
2013 Australian federal election: Brisbane
Party	Candidate	Votes	%	±%
Liberal National	Teresa Gambaro	41,681	47.99	+2.10
Labor	Fiona McNamara	26,163	30.12	−0.26
Greens	Rachael Jacobs	12,452	14.34	−6.94
Palmer United	Veronica Ford	3,643	4.19	+4.19
Katter's Australian	Connie Cicchini	951	1.09	+1.09
Family First	Sharyn Joyner	801	0.92	−0.65
Secular	Tony Rose	602	0.69	+0.69
Stable Population	John Roles	564	0.65	+0.65
Total formal votes		86,857	96.12	−0.12
Informal votes		3,504	3.88	+0.12
Turnout		90,361	92.80	+1.45
Two-party-preferred result
Liberal National	Teresa Gambaro	47,145	54.28	+3.15
Labor	Fiona McNamara	39,712	45.72	−3.15
Liberal National hold		Swing	+3.15	

==== 2010 ====
2010 Australian federal election: Brisbane
Party	Candidate	Votes	%	±%
Liberal National	Teresa Gambaro	37,191	45.89	+4.08
Labor	Arch Bevis	24,623	30.38	−13.22
Greens	Andrew Bartlett	17,244	21.28	+10.12
Family First	Mark White	1,274	1.57	+0.44
Socialist Alliance	Ewan Saunders	717	0.88	+0.36
Total formal votes		81,049	96.24	−0.88
Informal votes		3,169	3.76	+0.88
Turnout		84,218	91.32	−3.89
Two-party-preferred result
Liberal National	Teresa Gambaro	41,440	51.13	+5.73
Labor	Arch Bevis	39,609	48.87	−5.73
Liberal National gain from Labor		Swing	+5.73	

=== Elections in the 2000s ===
==== 2007 ====
2007 Australian federal election: Brisbane
Party	Candidate	Votes	%	±%
Labor	Arch Bevis	37,715	45.04	+2.58
Liberal	Ted O'Brien	32,989	39.40	−0.58
Greens	Elizabeth Guthrie	9,882	11.80	+2.47
Democrats	Don Sinnamon	1,226	1.51	−0.10
Family First	Mark White	1,183	1.41	−0.94
Socialist Alliance	Ewan Saunders	556	0.68	+0.28
Citizens Electoral Council	Nick Contarino	137	0.16	+0.06
Total formal votes		83,738	97.04	+1.27
Informal votes		2,554	2.96	−1.27
Turnout		86,292	94.10	+0.44
Two-party-preferred result
Labor	Arch Bevis	47,526	56.76	+2.82
Liberal	Ted O'Brien	36,212	43.24	−2.82
Labor hold		Swing	+2.82	

==== 2004 ====
2004 Australian federal election: Brisbane
Party	Candidate	Votes	%	±%
Labor	Arch Bevis	33,687	42.47	+4.83
Liberal	Ingrid Tall	31,721	39.99	−1.22
Greens	Richard Nielsen	7,349	9.26	+2.70
National	Nick Withycombe	2,242	2.83	+1.01
Family First	Charles Newington	1,899	2.39	+2.39
Democrats	Tracy Schrader	1,269	1.60	−7.07
Independent	J F Barnes	767	0.97	+0.97
Socialist Alliance	Coral Wynter	313	0.39	+0.39
Citizens Electoral Council	Nick Contarino	76	0.10	+0.10
Total formal votes		79,323	95.78	−0.48
Informal votes		3,495	4.22	+0.48
Turnout		82,818	92.40	−1.18
Two-party-preferred result
Labor	Arch Bevis	42,759	53.90	+2.87
Liberal	Ingrid Tall	36,564	46.10	−2.87
Labor hold		Swing	+2.87	

==== 2001 ====
2001 Australian federal election: Brisbane
Party	Candidate	Votes	%	±%
Liberal	Seb Monsour	33,704	39.32	+1.30
Labor	Arch Bevis	32,770	38.23	−6.11
Democrats	Damian Dewar	7,947	9.27	+3.20
Greens	Richard Nielsen	6,702	7.82	+3.06
One Nation	P. R. Jansen	1,878	2.19	−2.65
National	Sue Ekert	1,863	2.17	+2.17
	Ashley Lavelle	864	1.01	+1.01
Total formal votes		85,728	96.28	−0.93
Informal votes		3,315	3.72	+0.93
Turnout		89,043	93.65	
Two-party-preferred result
Labor	Arch Bevis	45,548	53.13	−1.46
Liberal	Seb Monsour	40,180	46.87	+1.46
Labor hold		Swing	−1.46	

=== Elections in the 1990s ===
==== 1998 ====
1998 Australian federal election: Brisbane
Party	Candidate	Votes	%	±%
Labor	Arch Bevis	35,653	44.34	+5.70
Liberal	Marion Feros	30,570	38.02	−6.05
Democrats	Darryl Holbrook	4,878	6.07	−2.77
One Nation	Samuel Tornatore	3,895	4.84	+4.84
Greens	Brenda Mason	3,824	4.76	+0.82
Independent	Duncan Spender	814	1.01	+1.01
Democratic Socialist	Graham Matthews	778	0.97	+0.97
Total formal votes		80,412	97.21	−0.35
Informal votes		2,311	2.79	+0.35
Turnout		82,723	92.78	+0.03
Two-party-preferred result
Labor	Arch Bevis	43,895	54.59	+3.93
Liberal	Marion Feros	36,517	45.41	−3.93
Labor hold		Swing	+3.93	

==== 1996 ====
1996 Australian federal election: Brisbane
Party	Candidate	Votes	%	±%
Liberal	Jane Williamson	34,686	44.65	+8.59
Labor	Arch Bevis	29,684	38.21	−7.44
Democrats	Andrew Bartlett	7,024	9.04	+3.21
Greens	Mark Taylor	3,180	4.09	−0.80
Women's Party	Jenny Dunn	1,354	1.74	+1.74
Independent	Bob Leach	739	0.95	+0.95
Independent	Zanny Begg	508	0.65	+0.65
Indigenous Peoples	Rose Mather	263	0.34	+0.34
Natural Law	Mark Brady	243	0.31	−0.39
Total formal votes		77,681	97.59	+0.56
Informal votes		1,917	2.41	−0.56
Turnout		79,598	92.75	−2.17
Two-party-preferred result
Labor	Arch Bevis	38,892	50.36	−5.84
Liberal	Jane Williamson	38,333	49.64	+5.84
Labor hold		Swing	−5.84	

==== 1993 ====
1993 Australian federal election: Brisbane
Party	Candidate	Votes	%	±%
Labor	Arch Bevis	34,917	46.96	+0.83
Liberal	Neil Ennis	26,717	35.93	+1.08
Democrats	Kerri Kellett	4,166	5.60	−7.19
Greens	Lou Gugenberger	2,484	3.34	+3.34
Independent	Tom Veivers	1,949	2.62	+2.62
National	Justin Choveaux	1,663	2.24	−0.80
	Susan Price	951	1.28	+1.28
Independent	M. P. Gibson	545	0.73	+0.73
Confederate Action	Robert Doring	452	0.61	+0.61
Natural Law	Valerie Thurlow	274	0.37	+0.37
Independent	Mariusz Chojnacki	239	0.32	+0.32
Total formal votes		74,357	97.13	−0.58
Informal votes		2,197	2.87	+0.58
Turnout		76,544	94.92	
Two-party-preferred result
Labor	Arch Bevis	41,610	55.99	−0.16
Liberal	Neil Ennis	32,705	44.01	+0.16
Labor hold		Swing	−0.16	

==== 1990 ====
1990 Australian federal election: Brisbane
Party	Candidate	Votes	%	±%
Labor	Arch Bevis	29,146	45.7	−5.5
Liberal	Keith Schafferius	22,573	35.4	+7.4
Democrats	Leo Talty	7,814	12.3	+6.2
National	Andrew Hassall	1,925	3.0	−10.5
Independent	Marylou Heath	1,410	2.2	+2.2
Independent	William Kenney	464	0.7	−0.6
Democratic Socialist	Peter Simmons	416	0.7	+0.7
Total formal votes		63,748	97.9	
Informal votes		1,384	2.1	
Turnout		65,132	95.1	
Two-party-preferred result
Labor	Arch Bevis	35,300	55.5	−0.9
Liberal	Keith Schafferius	28,342	44.5	+0.9
Labor hold		Swing	−0.9	

=== Elections in the 1980s ===
==== 1987 ====
1987 Australian federal election: Brisbane
Party	Candidate	Votes	%	±%
Labor	Manfred Cross	32,125	51.2	+0.9
Liberal	David Drake	17,543	28.0	+0.0
National	Cliff Newman	8,495	13.5	−2.0
Democrats	Michael van Prooyen	3,799	6.1	−0.1
Independent	William Kenney	792	1.3	+1.3
Total formal votes		62,754	97.1	
Informal votes		1,883	2.9	
Turnout		64,637	92.2	
Two-party-preferred result
Labor	Manfred Cross	35,409	56.4	+2.1
Liberal	David Drake	27,335	43.6	−2.1
Labor hold		Swing	+2.1	

==== 1984 ====
1984 Australian federal election: Brisbane
Party	Candidate	Votes	%	±%
Labor	Manfred Cross	30,391	50.3	+0.5
Liberal	Ian Douglas	16,918	28.0	−5.4
National	William Owen	9,370	15.5	+6.8
Democrats	George Leigh	3,764	6.2	+0.7
Total formal votes		60,443	95.5	
Informal votes		2,816	4.5	
Turnout		63,259	92.2	
Two-party-preferred result
Labor	Manfred Cross	32,841	54.3	−2.0
Liberal	Ian Douglas	27,588	45.7	+2.0
Labor hold		Swing	−2.0	

==== 1983 ====
1983 Australian federal election: Brisbane
Party	Candidate	Votes	%	±%
Labor	Manfred Cross	31,596	50.4	+2.3
Liberal	Richard Magnus	20,566	32.8	−11.9
National	Bradley Garrett	5,447	8.7	+8.7
Democrats	Lance Winter	3,462	5.5	−0.5
Socialist Workers	Susanne Bolton	1,565	2.5	+2.5
Total formal votes		62,636	98.6	
Informal votes		864	1.4	
Turnout		63,500	91.9	
Two-party-preferred result
Labor	Manfred Cross		56.9	+5.1
Liberal	Richard Magnus		43.1	−5.1
Labor hold		Swing	+5.1	

==== 1980 ====
1980 Australian federal election: Brisbane
Party	Candidate	Votes	%	±%
Labor	Manfred Cross	29,621	48.1	+6.8
Liberal	Peter Johnson	27,497	44.7	−2.4
Democrats	Anthony Walters	3,664	6.0	−4.0
Independent	William Kenney	788	1.3	+1.3
Total formal votes		61,570	98.1	
Informal votes		1,180	1.9	
Turnout		62,750	94.5	
Two-party-preferred result
Labor	Manfred Cross	31,881	51.8	+5.0
Liberal	Peter Johnson	29,689	48.2	−5.0
Labor gain from Liberal		Swing	+5.0	

=== Elections in the 1970s ===
==== 1977 ====
1977 Australian federal election: Brisbane
Party	Candidate	Votes	%	±%
Liberal	Peter Johnson	29,821	47.1	−1.5
Labor	Manfred Cross	26,103	41.3	+0.5
Democrats	Joan Hadley	6,299	10.0	+10.0
Progress	John Steele	1,038	1.6	−0.2
Total formal votes		63,261	98.4	
Informal votes		1,022	1.6	
Turnout		64,283	94.6	
Two-party-preferred result
Liberal	Peter Johnson	33,676	53.2	−5.2
Labor	Manfred Cross	29,585	46.8	+5.2
Liberal hold		Swing	−5.2	

==== 1975 ====
1975 Australian federal election: Brisbane
Party	Candidate	Votes	%	±%
Labor	Manfred Cross	24,802	45.3	−3.9
Liberal	Peter Johnson	24,130	44.1	+3.3
National Country	Harold Porter	4,813	8.8	+0.4
Workers	Rodney Jeanneret	1,000	1.8	+1.8
Independent	William Kenney	792	1.3	+1.3
Total formal votes		54,745	98.4	
Informal votes		889	1.6	
Turnout		55,634	93.0	
Two-party-preferred result
Liberal	Peter Johnson	29,495	53.9	+5.0
Labor	Manfred Cross	25,250	46.1	−5.0
Liberal gain from Labor		Swing	+5.0	

==== 1974 ====
1974 Australian federal election: Brisbane
Party	Candidate	Votes	%	±%
Labor	Manfred Cross	27,093	49.2	−0.2
Liberal	Jim Anderson	22,477	40.8	+11.3
Country	Bill Siller	4,600	8.4	−3.6
Australia	Jeffrey Malyon	900	1.6	+1.6
Total formal votes		55,070	97.8	
Informal votes		1,252	2.2	
Turnout		56,322	93.4	
Two-party-preferred result
Labor	Manfred Cross		51.1	−0.7
Liberal	Jim Anderson		48.9	+0.7
Labor hold		Swing	−0.7	

==== 1972 ====
1972 Australian federal election: Brisbane
Party	Candidate	Votes	%	±%
Labor	Manfred Cross	25,467	49.4	−2.8
Liberal	Jim Anderson	15,213	29.5	−10.0
Country	Glen Sheil	6,208	12.0	+12.0
Democratic Labor	Andrew Aitken	4,333	8.4	+0.1
Communist	Charlie Gifford	372	0.7	+0.7
Total formal votes		51,593	96.2	
Informal votes		2,024	3.8	
Turnout		53,617	93.6	
Two-party-preferred result
Labor	Manfred Cross		51.8	−2.1
Liberal	Jim Anderson		48.2	+2.1
Labor hold		Swing	−2.1	

=== Elections in the 1960s ===
==== 1969 ====
1969 Australian federal election: Brisbane
Party	Candidate	Votes	%	±%
Labor	Manfred Cross	28,764	52.2	+7.6
Liberal	Greg O'Dwyer	21,751	39.5	−6.9
Democratic Labor	Roger Judge	4,591	8.3	−0.6
Total formal votes		55,106	98.1	
Informal votes		1,083	1.9	
Turnout		56,189	93.9	
Two-party-preferred result
Labor	Manfred Cross		53.9	+7.0
Liberal	Gregory O'Dwyer		46.1	−7.0
Labor gain from Liberal		Swing	+2.1	

==== 1966 ====
1966 Australian federal election: Brisbane
Party	Candidate	Votes	%	±%
Labor	Manfred Cross	16,728	48.6	−1.5
Liberal	Brian Perkins	14,607	42.4	+2.3
Democratic Labor	Patrick Hallinan	3,076	8.9	+2.9
Total formal votes		34,411	97.0	
Informal votes		1,081	3.0	
Turnout		35,492	92.4	
Two-party-preferred result
Labor	Manfred Cross	17,516	50.9	−3.9
Liberal	Brian Perkins	16,895	49.1	+3.9
Labor hold		Swing	−3.9	

==== 1963 ====
1963 Australian federal election: Brisbane
Party	Candidate	Votes	%	±%
Labor	Manfred Cross	17,489	50.1	−3.6
Liberal	Leith Sinclair	13,999	40.1	+7.6
Democratic Labor	John O'Connell	2,087	6.0	−5.7
Communist	Warren Bowden	1,310	3.8	+1.8
Total formal votes		34,885	96.3	
Informal votes		1,357	3.7	
Turnout		36,242	94.4	
Two-party-preferred result
Labor	Manfred Cross		54.8	−2.8
Liberal	Leith Sinclair		45.2	+2.8
Labor hold		Swing	−2.8	

==== 1961 ====
1961 Australian federal election: Brisbane
Party	Candidate	Votes	%	±%
Labor	Manfred Cross	18,793	53.7	+6.4
Liberal	Kevin Cairns	11,384	32.5	−6.2
Queensland Labor	Walter Barnes	4,087	11.7	+0.4
Communist	Warren Bowden	713	2.0	+0.2
Total formal votes		34,977	95.6	
Informal votes		1,628	4.4	
Turnout		36,605	93.4	
Two-party-preferred result
Labor	Manfred Cross		57.6	+6.9
Liberal	Kevin Cairns		42.4	−6.9
Labor hold		Swing	+6.9	

=== Elections in the 1950s ===
==== 1958 ====
1958 Australian federal election: Brisbane
Party	Candidate	Votes	%	±%
Labor	George Lawson	17,360	47.3	−5.6
Liberal	Kevin Cairns	14,235	38.7	−5.3
Queensland Labor	Geoffrey Maule	4,135	11.3	+11.3
Communist	Jim Henderson	643	1.8	−1.3
Australian Nationalist	John Morgan	363	1.0	+1.0
Total formal votes		36,736	94.1	
Informal votes		2,290	5.9	
Turnout		39,026	94.7	
Two-party-preferred result
Labor	George Lawson	18,620	50.7	−5.0
Liberal	Kevin Cairns	18,116	49.3	+5.0
Labor hold		Swing	−5.0	

==== 1955 ====
1955 Australian federal election: Brisbane
Party	Candidate	Votes	%	±%
Labor	George Lawson	21,619	52.9	−2.5
Liberal	Kevin Cairns	18,001	44.0	+1.2
Communist	Claude Jones	1,269	3.1	+0.5
Total formal votes		40,889	97.2	
Informal votes		1,190	2.8	
Turnout		42,079	92.4	
Two-party-preferred result
Labor	George Lawson		55.7	−1.3
Liberal	Kevin Cairns		44.3	+1.3
Labor hold		Swing	−1.3	

==== 1954 ====
1954 Australian federal election: Brisbane
Party	Candidate	Votes	%	±%
Labor	George Lawson	16,964	56.2	+2.6
Liberal	Vic Mead	12,446	41.2	+1.2
Communist	Max Julius	773	2.6	−3.8
Total formal votes		30,183	98.2	
Informal votes		552	1.8	
Turnout		30,735	94.6	
Two-party-preferred result
Labor	George Lawson		58.5	−1.0
Liberal	Vic Mead		41.5	+1.0
Labor hold		Swing	−1.0	

==== 1951 ====
1951 Australian federal election: Brisbane
Party	Candidate	Votes	%	±%
Labor	George Lawson	18,588	53.6	+1.3
Liberal	Donagh McDonagh	13,883	40.0	−2.3
Communist	Alby Graham	2,225	6.4	+1.0
Total formal votes		34,696	97.5	
Informal votes		886	2.5	
Turnout		35,582	93.5	
Two-party-preferred result
Labor	George Lawson		59.5	+2.2
Liberal	Donagh McDonagh		40.5	−2.2
Labor hold		Swing	+2.2	

=== Elections in the 1940s ===
==== 1949 ====
1949 Australian federal election: Brisbane
Party	Candidate	Votes	%	±%
Labor	George Lawson	18,890	52.3	−7.4
Liberal	James Long	15,269	42.3	+6.0
Communist	Alby Graham	1,954	5.4	+5.4
Total formal votes		36,113	97.3	
Informal votes		1,021	2.7	
Turnout		37,134	93.6	
Two-party-preferred result
Labor	George Lawson		57.3	−6.4
Liberal	James Long		42.7	+6.4
Labor hold		Swing	−6.4	

==== 1946 ====
1946 Australian federal election: Brisbane
Party	Candidate	Votes	%	±%
Labor	George Lawson	33,763	54.6	+3.7
Liberal	Geoffrey Ward	22,314	36.1	+18.1
Services	Gordon Olive	5,806	9.4	+9.4
Total formal votes		61,883	96.7	
Informal votes		2,086	3.3	
Turnout		63,969	92.2	
Two-party-preferred result
Labor	George Lawson		57.0	+3.4
Liberal	Geoffrey Ward		43.0	+43.0
Labor hold		Swing	+3.4	

==== 1943 ====
1943 Australian federal election: Brisbane
Party	Candidate	Votes	%	±%
Labor	George Lawson	31,099	50.9	+0.5
Independent	Bruce Pie	17,317	28.3	+28.3
United Australia	John Fletcher	10,976	18.0	−31.6
One Parliament	Robert Boardman	1,701	2.8	+2.8
Total formal votes		61,093	97.0	
Informal votes		1,908	3.0	
Turnout		63,001	95.3	
Two-party-preferred result
Labor	George Lawson		53.6	+3.2
Independent	Bruce Pie		46.4	+46.4
Labor hold		Swing	+3.2	

==== 1940 ====
1940 Australian federal election: Brisbane
Party	Candidate	Votes	%	±%
Labor	George Lawson	27,474	50.4	−1.1
United Australia	John Fletcher	27,055	49.6	+5.3
Total formal votes		54,529	97.5	
Informal votes		1,396	2.5	
Turnout		55,925	92.7	
Labor hold		Swing	−3.2	

=== Elections in the 1930s ===
==== 1937 ====
1937 Australian federal election: Brisbane
Party	Candidate	Votes	%	±%
Labor	George Lawson	28,818	51.5	−0.4
United Australia	Graham Hart	24,808	44.3	+5.2
Social Credit	Ambrose Sawtell	2,362	4.2	+0.1
Total formal votes		55,988	96.5	
Informal votes		2,003	3.5	
Turnout		57,991	94.6	
Two-party-preferred result
Labor	George Lawson		53.6	−4.9
United Australia	Graham Hart		46.4	+4.9
Labor hold		Swing	−4.9	

==== 1934 ====
1934 Australian federal election: Brisbane
Party	Candidate	Votes	%	±%
Labor	George Lawson	27,218	51.9	+4.4
United Australia	Neil O'Sullivan	20,484	39.1	−8.1
Communist	Bert Hurworth	2,593	4.9	+4.9
Social Credit	Patrick Madden	2,147	4.1	+4.1
Total formal votes		52,442	97.0	
Informal votes		1,628	3.0	
Turnout		54,070	93.8	
Two-party-preferred result
Labor	George Lawson		58.5	+6.8
United Australia	Neil O'Sullivan		41.5	−6.8
Labor hold		Swing	+6.8	

==== 1931 ====
1931 Australian federal election: Brisbane
Party	Candidate	Votes	%	±%
United Australia	Donald Cameron	19,965	48.9	−3.5
Labor	George Lawson	19,152	46.9	−0.7
Lang Labor	Hugh Talty	1,725	4.2	+4.2
Total formal votes		40,842	97.7	
Informal votes		957	2.3	
Turnout		41,799	92.7	
Two-party-preferred result
Labor	George Lawson	20,691	50.7	+3.1
United Australia	Donald Cameron	20,151	49.3	−3.1
Labor gain from United Australia		Swing	+3.1	

=== Elections in the 1920s ===
==== 1929 ====
1929 Australian federal election: Brisbane
Party	Candidate	Votes	%	±%
Nationalist	Donald Cameron	21,048	52.4	−4.3
Labor	Myles Ferricks	19,103	47.6	+4.3
Total formal votes		40,151	97.1	
Informal votes		1,202	2.9	
Turnout		41,353	94.6	
Nationalist hold		Swing	−4.3	

==== 1928 ====
1928 Australian federal election: Brisbane
Party	Candidate	Votes	%	±%
Nationalist	Donald Cameron	21,563	56.7	+1.6
Labor	Frank Burke	16,500	43.3	−0.8
Total formal votes		38,063	93.6	
Informal votes		2,592	6.4	
Turnout		40,655	92.6	
Nationalist hold		Swing	+1.2	

==== 1925 ====
1925 Australian federal election: Brisbane
Party	Candidate	Votes	%	±%
Nationalist	Donald Cameron	20,902	55.1	+3.1
Labor	John Fihelly	16,711	44.1	−3.9
Independent Labor	Herbert Collie	322	0.8	+0.8
Total formal votes		37,935	97.3	
Informal votes		1,035	2.7	
Turnout		38,970	90.8	
Two-party-preferred result
Nationalist	Donald Cameron		55.5	+3.5
Labor	John Fihelly		44.5	−3.5
Nationalist hold		Swing	+3.5	

==== 1922 ====
1922 Australian federal election: Brisbane
Party	Candidate	Votes	%	±%
Nationalist	Donald Cameron	16,417	52.0	+3.6
Labor	Frank Burke	15,183	48.0	−3.6
Total formal votes		31,600	96.1	
Informal votes		1,285	3.9	
Turnout		32,885	80.7	
Nationalist gain from Labor		Swing	+2.5	

=== Elections in the 1910s ===
==== 1919 ====
1919 Australian federal election: Brisbane
Party	Candidate	Votes	%	±%
Nationalist	Donald Cameron	17,804	49.2	−0.8
Labor	William Finlayson	17,576	48.6	−1.4
Independent	Sine Boland	773	2.1	+2.1
Total formal votes		36,153	94.7	
Informal votes		2,035	5.3	
Turnout		38,188	85.5	
Two-party-preferred result
Nationalist	Donald Cameron	18,436	51.0	+1.0
Labor	William Finlayson	17,717	49.0	−1.0
Nationalist gain from Labor		Swing	+1.0	

==== 1917 ====
1917 Australian federal election: Brisbane
Party	Candidate	Votes	%	±%
Labor	William Finlayson	19,571	50.0	−10.3
Nationalist	Alfred Plane	19,556	50.0	+10.3
Total formal votes		39,127	97.8	
Informal votes		877	2.2	
Turnout		40,004	90.9	
Labor hold		Swing	−10.3	

==== 1914 ====
1914 Australian federal election: Brisbane
Party	Candidate	Votes	%	±%
Labor	William Finlayson	18,743	60.3	+3.4
Liberal	John Lackey	12,353	39.7	−3.4
Total formal votes		31,096	97.5	
Informal votes		809	2.5	
Turnout		31,905	74.7	
Labor hold		Swing	+3.4	

==== 1913 ====
1913 Australian federal election: Brisbane
Party	Candidate	Votes	%	±%
Labor	William Finlayson	18,559	56.9	+6.1
Liberal	Osborne Fenwick	14,050	43.1	−6.1
Total formal votes		32,609	97.1	
Informal votes		977	2.9	
Turnout		33,586	80.8	
Labor hold		Swing	+6.1	

==== 1910 ====
1910 Australian federal election: Brisbane
Party	Candidate	Votes	%	±%
Labour	William Finlayson	8,909	51.2	+12.6
Liberal	Justin Foxton	8,500	48.8	−12.5
Total formal votes		17,409	97.1	
Informal votes		501	2.9	
Turnout		17,930	61.0	
Labour gain from Liberal		Swing	+12.5	

=== Elections in the 1900s ===
==== 1906 ====
1906 Australian federal election: Brisbane
Party	Candidate	Votes	%	±%
Anti-Socialist	Justin Foxton	8,200	61.3	+61.3
Labour	Millice Culpin	5,187	38.7	−8.1
Total formal votes		13,387	96.7	
Informal votes		455	3.3	
Turnout		13,842	39.7	
Anti-Socialist gain from Labour		Swing	+13.4	

==== 1903 ====
1903 Australian federal election: Brisbane
Party	Candidate	Votes	%	±%
Labour	Millice Culpin	8,019	46.8	+15.1
Protectionist	William Morse	7,321	42.7	−4.1
Ind. Protectionist	Thomas Macdonald-Paterson	1,799	10.5	+10.5
Total formal votes		17,139	98.1	
Informal votes		327	1.9	
Turnout		17,466	51.2	
Labour gain from Protectionist		Swing	+9.7	

==== 1901 ====
1901 Australian federal election: Brisbane
Party	Candidate	Votes	%	±%
Protectionist	Thomas Macdonald-Paterson	3,351	46.8	+46.8
Labour	Daniel Guilfoyle	2,273	31.7	+31.7
Protectionist	Charles Hardie Buzacott	1,538	21.5	+21.5
Total formal votes		7,162	96.9	
Informal votes		234	3.1	
Turnout		7,396	57.0	
Protectionist win		(new seat)		
