= Madonna Jarrett =

Australian politician

Madonna Jarrett MP

Member of the Australian Parliament for Brisbane
- Incumbent
- Assumed office 3 May 2025
- Preceded by: Stephen Bates

Personal details
- Born: Madonna Louise Camp; 29 March 1966 (age 60) Paddington, Queensland, Australia
- Party: Labor
- Education: Queensland University of Technology
- Profession: Management consultant

Madonna Louise Jarrett (née Camp; born 29 March 1966) is an Australian politician. She is a member of the Australian Labor Party (ALP) and has served in the House of Representatives since the 2025 federal election, representing the Queensland seat of Brisbane. Prior to entering parliament she was a senior executive with Deloitte.

== Early life ==
Jarrett was born in Brisbane on 29 March 1966. She is one of eight children born to Luella and Jack Camp. Her father was a state vice-president of the ALP and stood unsuccessfully for the Senate in Queensland at the 1987 federal election.

Jarrett was raised in Paddington. She attended Mt St Michael's College, subsequently completing a Bachelor of Business at the Queensland University of Technology (QUT). She went on to complete a diploma in diagnostic radiography and worked as a radiographer for a period. She was also "actively involved in swimming clubs and the lifesaving movement, and represented Queensland in the 1991 national swimming titles".

== Career ==
Jarrett was an adviser to the New South Wales and Queensland state governments, including as an adviser and chief-of-staff to state government ministers during Wayne Goss's period as Queensland premier.

Jarrett later worked for consulting firm Deloitte for over 20 years, returning to Australia in 2019 after spending 15 years overseas, including in Belgium. At the time of her preselection for parliament in 2021 she was Deloitte Australia's director of global risk and public policy.

== Politics ==
Jarrett first stood for parliament at the 1995 Queensland state election, running unsuccessfully as the Labor candidate for the seat of Aspley.

In May 2021, Jarrett won Labor preselection for the federal seat of Brisbane, held by Liberal MP Trevor Evans. The seat was a key target for all major parties at the 2022 federal election, developing into a three-cornered contest between Jarrett, Evans and Greens candidate Stephen Bates. Jarrett placed second to Evans on the first-preference vote, but was narrowly passed by Bates following the distribution of preferences who went on to defeat Evans in the final two-candidate preferred count.

Jarrett was again preselected for the seat of Brisbane in July 2024. With all major party candidates from 2022 reprising their candidacies, she recorded a swing of nearly five percentage points at the 2025 election, part of an overall trend towards Labor in Queensland, and defeated Evans in the final two-candidate-preferred count to succeed Bates.

Jarrett is a member of the Queensland Labor Unity faction, and caucuses with Labor Left federally. Following her election, she joined the House Standing Committee on Economics, the Joint Standing Committee on Foreign Affairs, Defence and Trade, and the Joint Statutory Committee on Corporations and Financial Services.

Parliament of Australia
Preceded by Stephen Bates	Member for Brisbane; 2025–present	Incumbent
