= Stephen Bates =

Australian politician (born 1992)

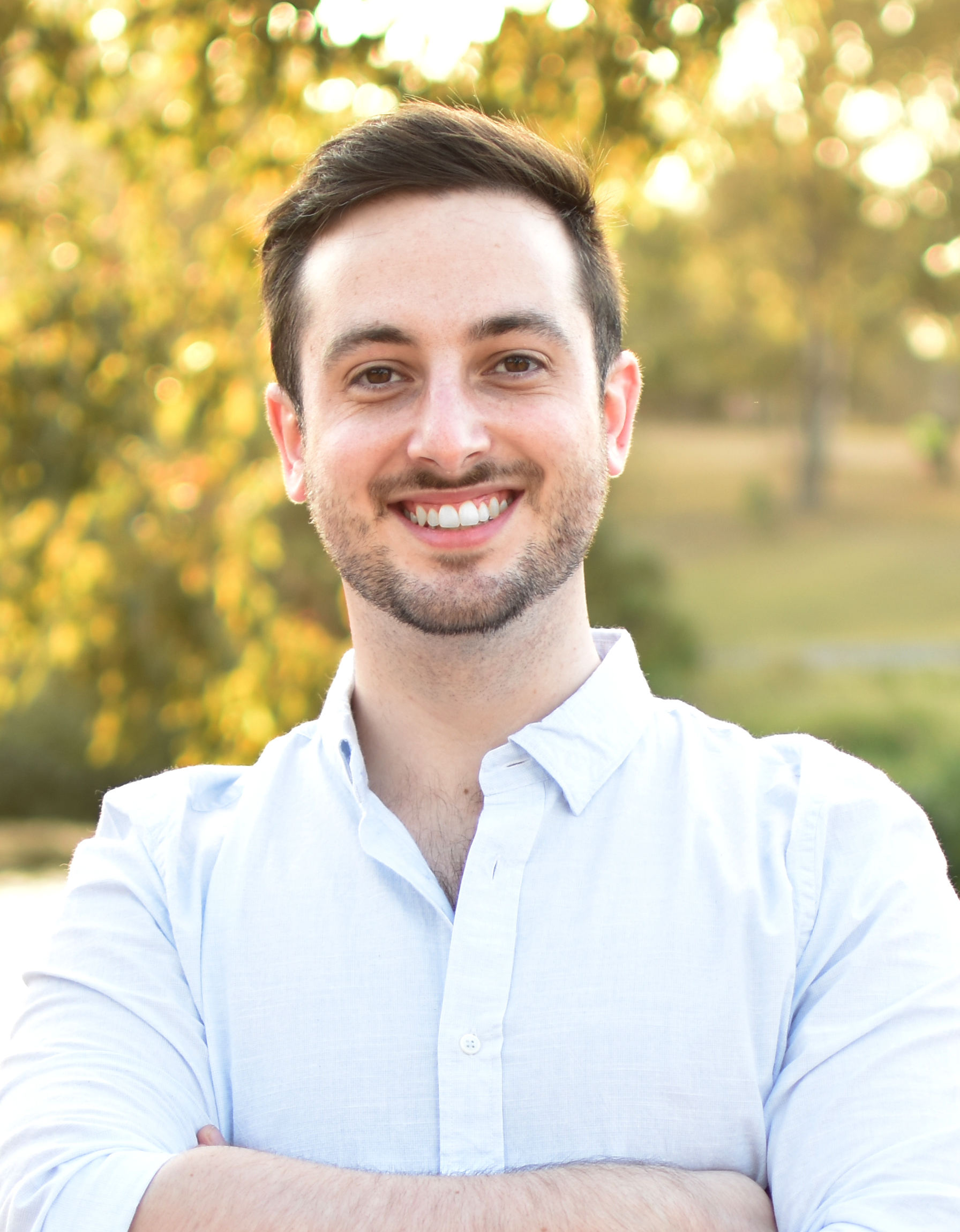
- Bates in 2020

Member of the Australian House of Representatives for Brisbane
- In office 21 May 2022 – 3 May 2025
- Preceded by: Trevor Evans
- Succeeded by: Madonna Jarrett

Personal details
- Born: Stephen James Bates; 23 November 1992 (age 33) Croydon, London, England
- Party: Greens (since 2019)
- Education: University of Queensland (BSocSci)
- Occupation: Politician and retail worker
- Website: stephenbates.com.au

Stephen James Bates (born 23 November 1992) is an Australian politician.

He served as the member for Brisbane from 2022 to 2025 as a member of the Australian Greens. He was elected in the 2022 Australian federal election, defeating sitting Liberal member and former National Retail Association CEO Trevor Evans. He was defeated for re-election in 2025 by Labor's Madonna Jarrett.

== Early life and education ==
Bates was born in Croydon, South London; his family moved to Australia during the 2008 financial crisis, settling in the central Queensland town of Yeppoon.

Bates studied at the University of Queensland (UQ), originally for a Bachelor of International Hotel and Tourism Management. While studying, he went to the United States to pursue a work opportunity. Bates has stated that his experience in the United States is what convinced him to enter politics, specifically his encountering of a coworker crying over whether to buy insulin or pay her rent.

When Bates moved back to Australia he changed his degree to a Bachelor of Social Science with a major in social and public policy, and graduated under that degree. Prior to being elected, Bates was a retail employee and a member of the Retail and Fast Food Workers Union.

== Political career ==
Bates first ran for office at the 2020 Queensland state election for the seat of Stafford. Bates was then the nominee of the Australian Greens for the Division of Brisbane in the 2022 Australian federal election, defeating incumbent MP Trevor Evans. Bates' campaign was noted for its use of geo-located Grindr advertisements with risqué slogans, such as promoting that "the best parliaments are hung". In an interview with radio station B105 FM, Bates credited the ads as a vital component of his election victory.

In the 2025 Australian federal election, Bates lost his seat after suffering a −1.36% swing against him in the primary vote, causing him to be excluded from the two-candidate preferred count.

== Personal life ==
Bates is openly gay and joined the Greens on the night of the 2019 federal election. He graduated UQ with a Bachelor of Social Science with a major in social and public policy.

Parliament of Australia
Preceded by Trevor Evans	Member for Brisbane; 2022–2025	Succeeded by Madonna Jarrett
