= Division of Brisbane =

Australian federal electoral division

Coordinates: 27.438°S 153.028°E

Brisbane Australian House of Representatives Division
- Interactive map of boundaries since the 2019 federal election
- Created: 1901
- MP: Madonna Jarrett
- Party: Labor
- Namesake: Brisbane
- Electors: 127,532 (2025)
- Area: 57 km^{2} (22.0 sq mi)
- Demographic: Inner metropolitan
Electorates around Brisbane:
| Lilley | Lilley | Lilley |
| Ryan | Brisbane | Bonner |
| Ryan | Griffith | Griffith |

The Division of Brisbane is an Australian electoral division in the state of Queensland. It is centred on and named after the city of Brisbane, the state capital. The division encompasses Brisbane CBD and surrounding areas on the left bank of the Brisbane River.

Since 2025 its MP has been Madonna Jarrett of the Labor Party.

== History ==
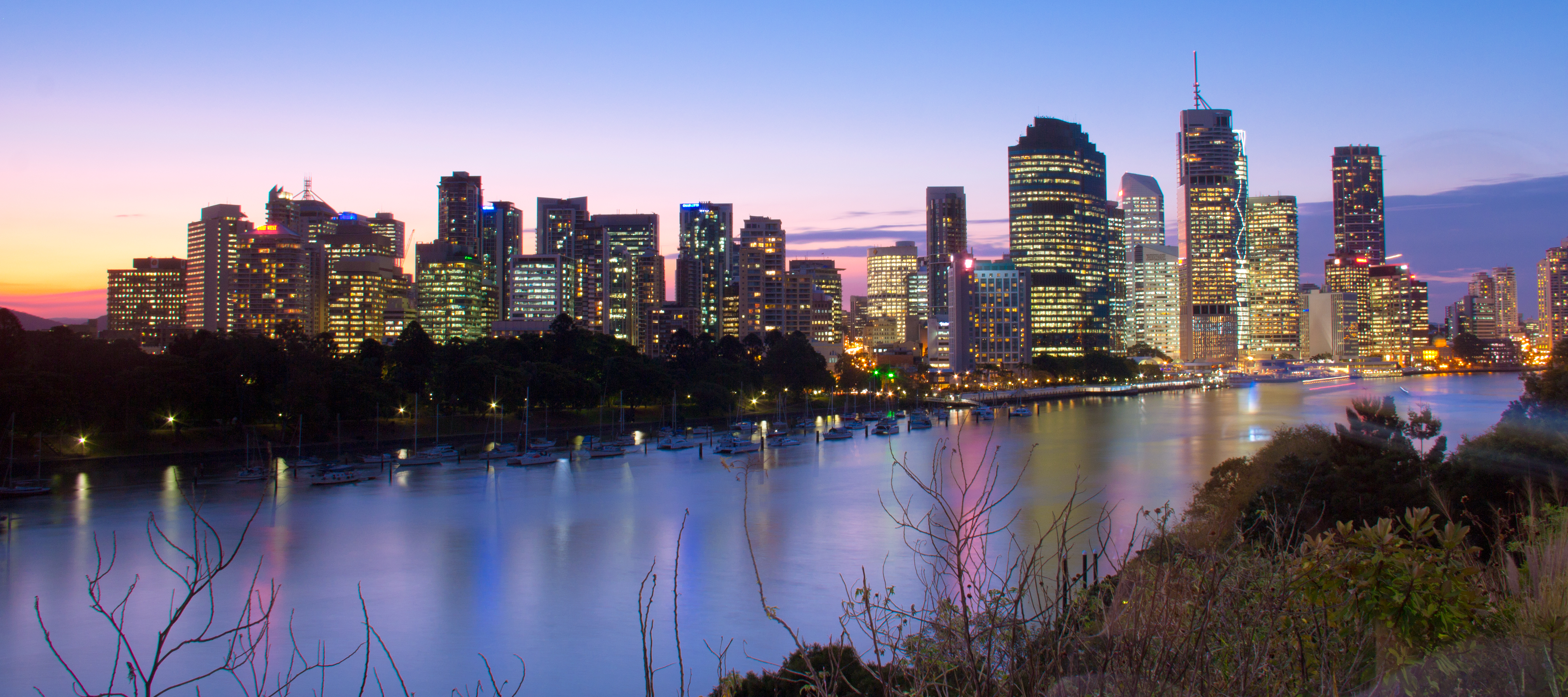
The city of Brisbane, the division's namesake (pictured August 2012)

The division was proclaimed in 1900, and was one of the original 65 divisions to be contested at the first federal election. It is named after the city of Brisbane.

It was in Labor hands for all but five years from 1931 to 2010, and for most of that time was a marginal Labor seat. However, a redistribution ahead of the 2010 election pushed the seat into more conservative-leaning territory east of Breakfast Creek. This helped Liberal Party challenger Teresa Gambaro take the seat from Labor incumbent Arch Bevis, marking the first time in over a century that Labor had been in government without holding Brisbane. She was re-elected in 2013 with an increased majority.

Gambaro did not re-contest the seat at the 2016 election. The contest was historic in that it was the first Australian federal election where both major party candidates in a lower house seat contest were openly gay – Trevor Evans for the Liberal Nationals and Pat O'Neill for Labor. Evans retained the seat for the LNP. Evans was re-elected in 2019 despite being the only incumbent Liberal National MP to suffer a swing against them at that election.

The seat of Brisbane has a growing Greens vote, with the party being only 2.12% short of overtaking the Labor Party on primary vote and thus likely entering the two-party preferred vote. The Greens won 2 booths at the 2019 federal election (Kelvin Grove and Spring Hill) and came second in a further 9 booths. The increase in the Greens vote in Brisbane has come largely at the expense of the Labor Party, with their vote having dropped by 22.47% from 1993, when the Greens first contested Brisbane, to 2019, where the Greens received 22.37% of the overall vote. In the 2022 federal election, Greens candidate Stephen Bates won the seat. The party also won the neighbouring divisions of Ryan and Griffith.

== Boundaries ==
On its original boundaries, Brisbane covered all of what is now the northern part of the City of Brisbane, but successive boundary changes cut it back to the inner suburban area. However, between 1913 and 1949 the seat instead covered the inner south-west.

Since 1984, federal electoral division boundaries in Australia have been determined at redistributions by a redistribution committee appointed by the Australian Electoral Commission. Redistributions occur for the boundaries of divisions in a particular state, and they occur every seven years, or sooner if a state's representation entitlement changes or when divisions of a state are malapportioned.

It now extends from the city centre into the western suburbs, and includes the Brisbane CBD, Alderley, Ashgrove, Bowen Hills, Clayfield, Enoggera, Ferny Grove, Fortitude Valley, Gaythorne, Grange, Herston, Kelvin Grove, Keperra, Milton, Mitchelton, New Farm, Newmarket, Newstead, Teneriffe, Red Hill, Spring Hill, Upper Kedron, Wilston, Windsor, Gordon Park, Wooloowin, Lutwyche, parts of Bardon, Everton Park, Paddington and Stafford.

In the 2009 redistribution announced by the Australian Electoral Commission, the suburbs of Hendra, Ascot and Hamilton were included in the seat of Brisbane.

== Members ==
| Image | Member | Party | Term | Notes |
|---|---|---|---|---|
| | Thomas Macdonald-Paterson (1844–1906) | Protectionist | 30 March 1901 – 1903 | Previously held the Legislative Assembly of Queensland seat of Brisbane North. Lost preselection and then lost seat |
| | Thomas Macdonald-Paterson (1844–1906) | Independent Protectionist | 1903 – 16 December 1903 | Previously held the Legislative Assembly of Queensland seat of Brisbane North. Lost preselection and then lost seat |
| | Millice Culpin (1846–1941) | Labour | 16 December 1903 – 12 December 1906 | Lost seat |
| | Justin Foxton (1849–1916) | Anti-Socialist | 12 December 1906 – 26 May 1909 | Previously held the Legislative Assembly of Queensland seat of Carnarvon. Served as minister under Deakin. Lost seat |
| | Justin Foxton (1849–1916) | Liberal | 26 May 1909 – 13 April 1910 | Previously held the Legislative Assembly of Queensland seat of Carnarvon. Served as minister under Deakin. Lost seat |
| | William Finlayson (1867–1955) | Labor | 13 April 1910 – 13 December 1919 | Lost seat. Later appointed to the Queensland Legislative Council in 1920 |
| | Donald Cameron (1879–1960) | Nationalist | 13 December 1919 – 7 May 1931 | Lost seat. Later elected to the Division of Lilley in 1934 |
| | Donald Cameron (1879–1960) | United Australia | 7 May 1931 – 19 December 1931 | Lost seat. Later elected to the Division of Lilley in 1934 |
| | George Lawson (1880–1966) | Labor | 19 December 1931 – 2 November 1961 | Previously a member of the Queensland Legislative Council. Served as minister under Curtin. Retired. Last veteran of the Second Boer War to serve in the House of Representatives |
| | Manfred Cross (1929–2024) | Labor | 9 December 1961 – 13 December 1975 | Lost seat |
| | Peter Johnson (1943–) | Liberal | 13 December 1975 – 18 October 1980 | Lost seat |
| | Manfred Cross (1929–2024) | Labor | 18 October 1980 – 19 February 1990 | Retired |
| | Arch Bevis (1955–) | Labor | 24 March 1990 – 21 August 2010 | Lost seat |
| | Teresa Gambaro (1958–) | Liberal (Note: Member of the Liberal National Party of Queensland who sat with the parliamentary Liberal Party.) | 21 August 2010 – 9 May 2016 | Previously held the Division of Petrie. Retired |
| | Trevor Evans (1981–) | Liberal | 2 July 2016 – 21 May 2022 | Lost seat |
| | Stephen Bates (1992–) | Greens | 21 May 2022 – 3 May 2025 | Lost seat |
| | Madonna Jarrett (1966–) | Labor | 3 May 2025 – present | Incumbent |

== Election results ==
2025 Australian federal election: Brisbane
| Party | Candidate | Votes | % | ±% |
|---|---|---|---|---|
| Liberal National | Trevor Evans | 37,951 | 34.27 | −3.44 |
| Labor | Madonna Jarrett | 35,607 | 32.15 | +4.90 |
| Greens | Stephen Bates | 28,663 | 25.88 | −1.36 |
| One Nation | Cheryl Wood | 2,798 | 2.53 | +0.30 |
| People First | Joseph Wheeler | 2,354 | 2.13 | +2.13 |
| Trumpet of Patriots | Brian Thiele | 1,398 | 1.26 | +1.26 |
| Fusion | Rachael Blackwood | 1,095 | 0.99 | +0.99 |
| Family First | Kirsten Sands | 879 | 0.79 | +0.79 |
| Total formal votes | | 110,745 | 96.81 | −1.11 |
| Informal votes | | 3,645 | 3.19 | +1.11 |
| Turnout | | 114,390 | 89.71 | +0.97 |
Two-party-preferred result
| Labor | Madonna Jarrett | 65,295 | 58.96 | +4.56 |
| Liberal National | Trevor Evans | 45,450 | 41.04 | −4.56 |
| Labor gain from Greens | | Swing | +4.56 | |
