= Trevor Evans (politician) =

Australian politician

The Honourable Trevor Evans
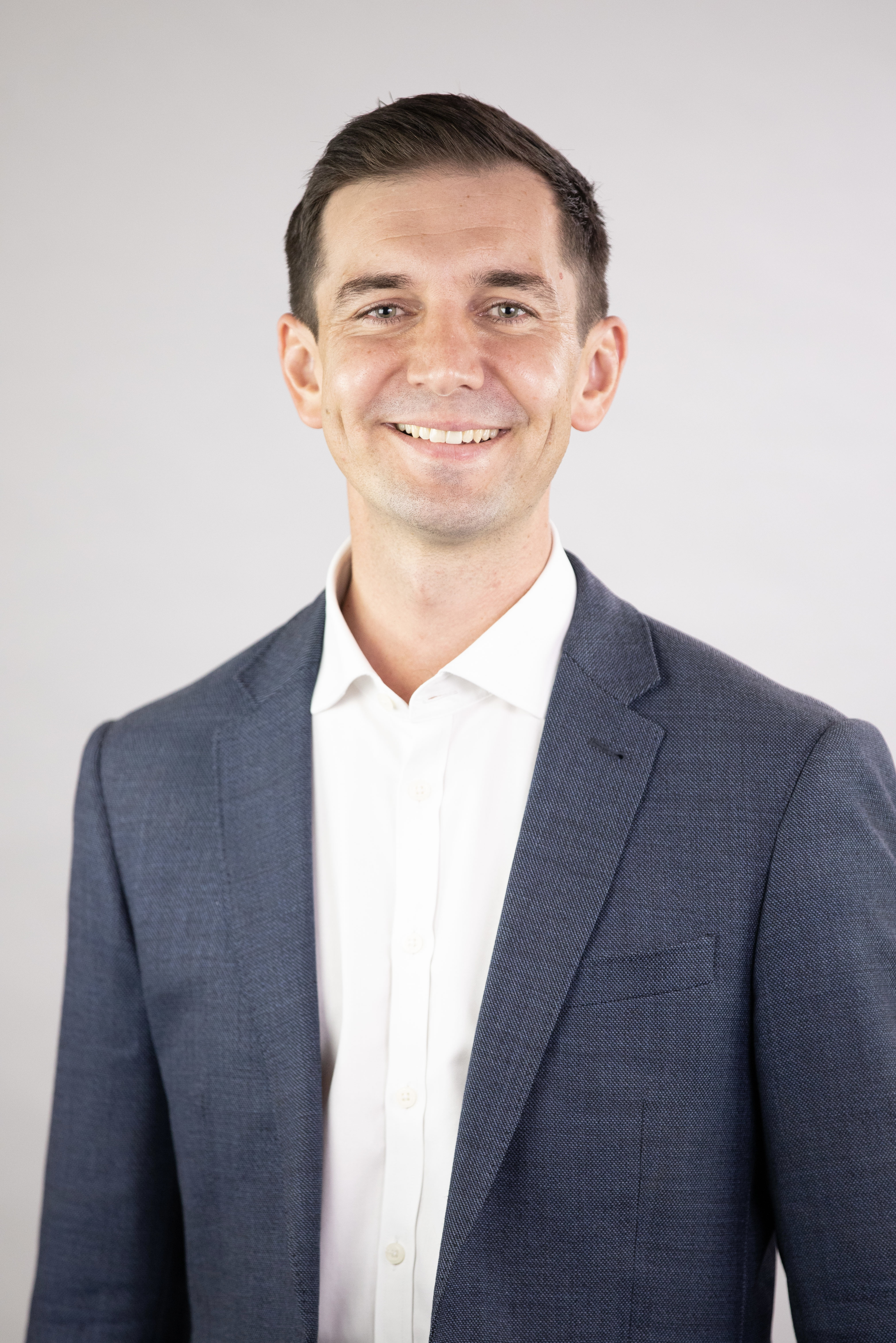
- Evans in 2019

Member of the Australian Parliament for Brisbane
- In office 2 July 2016 – 21 May 2022
- Preceded by: Teresa Gambaro
- Succeeded by: Stephen Bates

Personal details
- Born: Trevor Mark Evans; 28 August 1981 (age 44) Tweed Heads, New South Wales, Australia
- Party: Liberal National
- Education: University of Queensland
- Profession: Economist

Trevor Mark Evans (born 28 August 1981) is a former Australian politician who was a member of the House of Representatives from 2016 to 2022, representing the Division of Brisbane. He was a member of the Liberal National Party of Queensland, and sat with the Liberal Party in federal parliament. Evans served as the Assistant Minister for Waste Reduction and Environmental Management in the Morrison government from May 2019 until his defeat in May 2022.

== Early life ==
Evans was born on 28 August 1981 in Tweed Heads, New South Wales. He is one of four children born to Norm and Carol Evans. He was educated in government schools in Mitcham, Victoria; Elimbah, Queensland; and Beerwah, Queensland. Evans holds the degrees of Bachelor of Economics and Bachelor of Laws (Hons.) from the University of Queensland. He was the first member of his family to attend university.

== Professional career ==
Evans was an investigator with the Australian Competition & Consumer Commission from 2004 to 2007, an economist with the Queensland Competition Authority from 2008 to 2009, the chief of staff to then Shadow Minister for Health Peter Dutton in 2010, and an economist with Seqwater from 2011 to 2012. Before his election in 2016, Evans was the chief executive officer of the National Retail Association from 2012.

== Parliamentary career ==
In 2016, Evans was preselected as the LNP candidate for Brisbane, replacing the retiring Teresa Gambaro. The contest for Brisbane in 2016 was the first time both major parties had put forward openly gay candidates in a single electorate: Evans and his Labor opponent, Pat O'Neill.

Evans retained Brisbane for the LNP at the 2016 federal election and was re-elected in 2019. He was subsequently appointed Assistant Minister for Waste Reduction and Environmental Management in the Second Morrison Ministry, under Environment Minister Sussan Ley and held this position until the May 2022 election.

From 1 February 2025, Evans began publicly campaigning to re-contest his former seat of Brisbane in the upcoming Federal Election.

=== Political positions ===
Evans is a member of the Moderate/Modern Liberal faction of the Liberal Party.

Evans opposed the Australian Marriage Law Postal Survey, a policy of the Turnbull government, preferring that the issue of same-sex marriage be put directly to a parliamentary vote.

== Personal life ==
Evans announced his engagement to obstetrician Roger Martin in 2021. He is Queensland's first openly gay federal MP.

Parliament of Australia
Preceded by Teresa Gambaro	Member for Brisbane; 2016–2022	Succeeded by Stephen Bates
