= Electoral results for the Division of Ryan =

Australian division election results

This is a list of electoral results for the Division of Ryan in Australian federal elections from the division's creation in 1949 until the present.

== Members ==
Member	Party	Term
Nigel Drury	Liberal	1949–1975
John Moore	Liberal	1975–2001
Leonie Short	Labor	2001–2001
Michael Johnson	Liberal	2001–2010
Michael Johnson	Independent	2010–2010
Jane Prentice	Liberal National	2010–2019
Julian Simmonds	Liberal National	2019–2022
Elizabeth Watson-Brown	Greens	2022–present

== Election results ==
=== Elections in the 2020s ===
==== 2025 ====
2025 Australian federal election: Ryan
Party	Candidate	Votes	%	±%
Family First	Donna Gallehawk			
Labor	Rebecca Hack			
Fusion	Gina Masterton			
Greens	Elizabeth Watson-Brown			
Liberal National	Maggie Forrest			
People First	N. De Lapp			
Trumpet of Patriots	Ryan Hunt			
One Nation	Robbie Elsom			
Total formal votes				
Informal votes				
Turnout				

==== 2022 ====
2022 Australian federal election: Ryan
Party	Candidate	Votes	%	±%
Liberal National	Julian Simmonds	38,239	38.50	−10.11
Greens	Elizabeth Watson-Brown	30,003	30.21	+9.86
Labor	Peter Cossar	22,146	22.30	−2.13
Liberal Democrats	Damian Coory	2,582	2.60	+2.60
One Nation	Joel Love	2,237	2.25	+0.09
United Australia	Kathryn Pollard	2,062	2.08	+0.55
Animal Justice	Jina Lipman	1,088	1.10	−0.82
Progressives	Janine Rees	606	0.61	+0.61
Federation	Axel Dancoisne	353	0.36	+0.36
Total formal votes		99,316	96.94	−0.66
Informal votes		3,140	3.06	+0.66
Turnout		102,456	92.04	−0.94
Notional two-party-preferred count
Labor	Peter Cossar	52,062	52.42	+8.45
Liberal National	Julian Simmonds	47,254	47.58	−8.45
Two-candidate-preferred result
Greens	Elizabeth Watson-Brown	52,286	52.65	+52.65
Liberal National	Julian Simmonds	47,030	47.35	−8.67
Greens gain from Liberal National				

Alluvial diagram for preference flows in the seat of Ryan in the 2022 federal election. indicates at what stage the winning candidate had over 50% of the votes and was declared the winner.

=== Elections in the 2010s ===
==== 2019 ====
2019 Australian federal election: Ryan
Party	Candidate	Votes	%	±%
Liberal National	Julian Simmonds	46,869	48.61	−3.51
Labor	Peter Cossar	23,560	24.43	+1.46
Greens	Jake Schoermer	19,621	20.35	+1.59
One Nation	Rodney Miles	2,080	2.16	+2.16
Animal Justice	Joanne Webb	1,854	1.92	+1.92
United Australia	Larry Crouch	1,478	1.53	+1.53
Conservative National	Andrew Banks	964	1.00	+1.00
Total formal votes		96,426	97.60	−0.04
Informal votes		2,369	2.40	+0.04
Turnout		98,795	92.98	−0.34
Two-party-preferred result
Liberal National	Julian Simmonds	54,023	56.03	−2.95
Labor	Peter Cossar	42,403	43.97	+2.95
Liberal National hold		Swing	−2.95	

==== 2016 ====
2016 Australian federal election: Ryan
Party	Candidate	Votes	%	±%
Liberal National	Jane Prentice	49,402	52.13	+0.45
Labor	Stephen Hegedus	21,594	22.79	−2.72
Greens	Sandra Bayley	17,767	18.75	+4.31
Family First	David Todd	2,389	2.52	+1.20
Liberal Democrats	Sly Gryphon	2,046	2.16	+2.16
Democratic Labour	John Quinn	1,566	1.65	+1.65
Total formal votes		94,764	97.61	+0.86
Informal votes		2,318	2.39	−0.86
Turnout		97,082	92.43	−1.69
Two-party-preferred result
Liberal National	Jane Prentice	55,994	59.09	+0.55
Labor	Stephen Hegedus	38,770	40.91	−0.55
Liberal National hold		Swing	+0.55	

==== 2013 ====
2013 Australian federal election: Ryan
Party	Candidate	Votes	%	±%
Liberal National	Jane Prentice	47,366	51.68	+5.95
Labor	Damien Hamwood	23,385	25.51	+0.49
Greens	Charles Worringham	13,235	14.44	−4.52
Palmer United	Craig Gunnis	4,558	4.97	+4.97
Family First	Lisa Demedio	1,213	1.32	−0.48
Katter's Australian	Peter Walker	1,140	1.24	+1.24
Secular	Michael Sweedman	761	0.83	+0.83
Total formal votes		91,658	96.75	−0.38
Informal votes		3,078	3.25	+0.38
Turnout		94,736	94.12	+0.81
Two-party-preferred result
Liberal National	Jane Prentice	53,657	58.54	+1.38
Labor	Damien Hamwood	38,001	41.46	−1.38
Liberal National hold		Swing	+1.38	

==== 2010 ====
2010 Australian federal election: Ryan
Party	Candidate	Votes	%	±%
Liberal National	Jane Prentice	40,713	45.73	−1.16
Labor	Steven Miles	22,274	25.02	−13.54
Greens	Sandra Bayley	16,884	18.96	+9.08
Independent	Michael Johnson	7,563	8.49	+8.49
Family First	Allan Vincent	1,600	1.80	+0.27
Total formal votes		89,034	97.13	−0.72
Informal votes		2,631	2.87	+0.72
Turnout		91,665	93.32	−2.43
Two-party-preferred result
Liberal National	Jane Prentice	50,896	57.16	+5.95
Labor	Steven Miles	38,138	42.84	−5.95
Liberal National hold		Swing	+5.95	

=== Elections in the 2000s ===
==== 2007 ====
2007 Australian federal election: Ryan
Party	Candidate	Votes	%	±%
Liberal	Michael Johnson	41,646	49.52	−5.24
Labor	Ross Daniels	30,619	36.41	+7.00
Greens	Evan Jones	7,933	9.43	−0.33
Independent	Charles Worringham	1,328	1.58	+1.58
Democrats	James Page	1,207	1.44	−0.98
Family First	Leisa Schmid	1,120	1.33	−2.03
Liberty & Democracy	Jock Mackenzie	155	0.18	+0.18
Citizens Electoral Council	Neville Solomon	90	0.11	−0.17
Total formal votes		84,098	97.86	+1.66
Informal votes		1,842	2.14	−1.66
Turnout		85,940	94.95	+0.64
Two-party-preferred result
Liberal	Michael Johnson	45,258	53.82	−6.60
Labor	Ross Daniels	38,840	46.18	+6.60
Liberal hold		Swing	−6.60	

==== 2004 ====
2004 Australian federal election: Ryan
Party	Candidate	Votes	%	±%
Liberal	Michael Johnson	43,499	54.76	+6.27
Labor	Victoria Chatterjee	23,365	29.41	−0.31
Greens	Paul Swan	7,753	9.76	+4.38
Family First	Percy Campbell	2,670	3.36	+3.36
Democrats	Simon Ingram	1,926	2.42	−3.86
Citizens Electoral Council	Neville Solomon	222	0.28	+0.28
Total formal votes		79,435	96.20	−1.06
Informal votes		3,134	3.80	+1.06
Turnout		82,569	94.31	−2.17
Two-party-preferred result
Liberal	Michael Johnson	47,997	60.42	+0.86
Labor	Victoria Chatterjee	31,438	39.58	−0.86
Liberal hold		Swing	+0.86	

==== 2001 ====
2001 Australian federal election: Ryan
Party	Candidate	Votes	%	±%
Liberal	Michael Johnson	38,894	47.57	−2.83
Labor	Leonie Short	25,603	31.32	+0.97
National	Stewart Gillies	5,049	6.18	+6.18
Democrats	Jason Langenauer	4,742	5.80	−2.18
Greens	Mike Stasse	4,035	4.94	+1.11
One Nation	John Drew	1,339	1.64	−3.60
HEMP	Clive Brazier	1,084	1.33	+1.33
Independent	Stephen Allen-Ankins	1,010	1.24	+1.24
Total formal votes		81,756	97.14	−0.54
Informal votes		2,404	2.86	+0.54
Turnout		84,160	96.02	
Two-party-preferred result
Liberal	Michael Johnson	47,928	58.62	−0.90
Labor	Leonie Short	33,828	41.38	+0.90
Liberal hold		Swing	−0.90	

John Moore (Liberal) had won the seat at the 1998 election, however he retired in 2001 and Leonie Short (Labor) won the seat at the resulting by-election.

==== 2001 by-election ====
Ryan by-election, 2001
Party	Candidate	Votes	%	±%
Liberal	Bob Tucker	32,571	43.19	−7.21
Labor	Leonie Short	29,173	38.68	+8.33
Greens	Mike Stasse	4,608	6.11	−2.28
Democrats	Lyn Dengate	3,808	5.05	−2.93
HEMP	Nigel Freemarijuana	1,685	2.23	+2.23
Independent	Jody Moore	1,351	1.79	+1.79
Christian Democrats	Andrew Hassall	955	1.27	+1.27
Independent	Terry Hyland	822	1.09	+1.09
Independent	Warren Stagg	440	0.58	+0.58
Total formal votes		75,413	97.04	−0.65
Informal votes		2,304	2.96	+0.65
Turnout		77,717	88.68	−5.71
Two-party-preferred result
Labor	Leonie Short	37,834	50.17	+9.69
Liberal	Bob Tucker	37,579	49.83	−9.69
Labor gain from Liberal		Swing	+9.69	

=== Elections in the 1990s ===
==== 1998 ====
1998 Australian federal election: Ryan
Party	Candidate	Votes	%	±%
Liberal	John Moore	38,785	50.40	−9.17
Labor	Teresa Farruggio	23,350	30.35	+5.00
Democrats	Lyn Dengate	6,139	7.98	−2.00
One Nation	Alan Smith	4,032	5.24	+5.24
Greens	Brian Hoepper	2,945	3.83	+0.62
Independent	Peter Mackenzie	1,186	1.54	+1.54
Independent	Alan Skyring	353	0.46	−0.59
Australia First	John Barker	158	0.21	+0.21
Total formal votes		76,948	97.69	−0.53
Informal votes		1,822	2.31	+0.53
Turnout		78,770	94.39	−0.80
Two-party-preferred result
Liberal	John Moore	45,799	59.52	−7.46
Labor	Teresa Farruggio	31,149	40.48	+7.46
Liberal hold		Swing	−7.46	

==== 1996 ====
1996 Australian federal election: Ryan
Party	Candidate	Votes	%	±%
Liberal	John Moore	46,508	59.85	+7.38
Labor	Howard Nielsen	19,526	25.13	−6.15
Democrats	Diane Watson	7,850	10.10	+4.09
Greens	Willy Bach	2,405	3.09	−1.41
Independent	Alan Skyring	857	1.10	+0.65
Indigenous Peoples	Cheryl Cannon	293	0.38	+0.20
Natural Law	Valerie Thurlow	267	0.34	+0.02
Total formal votes		77,706	98.26	+0.55
Informal votes		1,374	1.74	−0.55
Turnout		79,080	95.19	−0.83
Two-party-preferred result
Liberal	John Moore	51,712	66.87	+6.15
Labor	Howard Nielsen	25,620	33.13	−6.15
Liberal hold		Swing	+6.15	

==== 1993 ====
1993 Australian federal election: Ryan
Party	Candidate	Votes	%	±%
Liberal	John Moore	40,953	52.59	+6.90
Labor	Fleur Yuile	23,698	30.43	+1.36
Democrats	Sid Young	5,019	6.45	−11.18
Greens	Willy Bach	3,795	4.87	+4.87
National	Jim Gillan	2,662	3.42	−2.25
Confederate Action	Les Smith	561	0.72	+0.72
Independent	Alan Skyring	431	0.55	−0.73
Independent	Terry Madden	417	0.54	+0.54
Natural Law	Mark Brady	330	0.42	+0.42
Total formal votes		77,866	97.89	−0.68
Informal votes		1,677	2.11	+0.68
Turnout		79,543	96.02	
Two-party-preferred result
Liberal	John Moore	47,175	60.61	+2.48
Labor	Fleur Yuile	30,662	39.39	−2.48
Liberal hold		Swing	+2.48	

==== 1990 ====
1990 Australian federal election: Ryan
Party	Candidate	Votes	%	±%
Liberal	John Moore	31,301	43.8	+1.2
Labor	Denny Campbell	21,085	29.5	−5.9
Democrats	Adair Ferguson	13,669	19.1	+10.6
National	Helen McAllister	4,325	6.0	−7.5
Independent	Alan Skyring	1,139	1.6	+1.6
Total formal votes		71,519	98.7	
Informal votes		955	1.3	
Turnout		72,474	95.6	
Two-party-preferred result
Liberal	John Moore	40,870	57.2	−1.7
Labor	Denny Campbell	30,576	42.8	+1.7
Liberal hold		Swing	−1.7	

=== Elections in the 1980s ===
==== 1987 ====
1987 Australian federal election: Ryan
Party	Candidate	Votes	%	±%
Liberal	John Moore	28,356	42.6	+1.9
Labor	Fleur Yuile	23,538	35.4	+1.4
National	Steve Walters	9,015	13.5	−3.5
Democrats	Daphne Woodhouse	5,657	8.5	+0.2
Total formal votes		66,566	97.9	
Informal votes		1,401	2.1	
Turnout		67,967	92.5	
Two-party-preferred result
Liberal	John Moore	39,181	58.9	−1.5
Labor	Fleur Yuile	27,379	41.1	+1.5
Liberal hold		Swing	−1.5	

==== 1984 ====
1984 Australian federal election: Ryan
Party	Candidate	Votes	%	±%
Liberal	John Moore	24,734	40.7	−12.2
Labor	Mike Foley	20,644	34.0	−1.8
National	Maxwell Crofts	10,300	17.0	+17.0
Democrats	John Peeters	5,029	8.3	−0.1
Total formal votes		60,707	97.1	
Informal votes		1,839	2.9	
Turnout		62,546	92.7	
Two-party-preferred result
Liberal	John Moore	36,641	60.4	+3.1
Labor	Mike Foley	24,053	39.6	−3.1
Liberal hold		Swing	+3.1	

==== 1983 ====
1983 Australian federal election: Ryan
Party	Candidate	Votes	%	±%
Liberal	John Moore	37,873	53.1	−2.0
Labor	Michael Foley	25,386	35.6	+1.6
Democrats	John Elfick	5,975	8.4	−0.6
Independent	Anthony Crooks	1,135	1.6	+1.6
Independent	Patrick Cusack	964	1.4	+1.4
Total formal votes		71,333	98.2	
Informal votes		862	1.2	
Turnout		72,195	92.7	
Two-party-preferred result
Liberal	John Moore		57.5	−2.9
Labor	Michael Foley		42.5	+2.9
Liberal hold		Swing	−2.9	

==== 1980 ====
1980 Australian federal election: Ryan
Party	Candidate	Votes	%	±%
Liberal	John Moore	36,780	55.1	−5.9
Labor	Peter Beattie	22,697	34.0	+0.8
Democrats	Geoffrey Rees	6,004	9.0	+3.2
Progress	Philip Sturgess	1,297	1.9	+1.9
Total formal votes		66,778	98.6	
Informal votes		921	1.4	
Turnout		67,699	94.6	
Two-party-preferred result
Liberal	John Moore		60.4	−3.0
Labor	Peter Beattie		39.6	+3.0
Liberal hold		Swing	−3.0	

=== Elections in the 1970s ===
==== 1977 ====
1977 Australian federal election: Ryan
Party	Candidate	Votes	%	±%
Liberal	John Moore	38,331	61.0	+17.8
Labor	Gailene Harrison	20,866	33.2	+1.3
Progress	Jili Boughen	3,617	5.8	+5.8
Total formal votes		62,814	98.7	
Informal votes		798	1.3	
Turnout		63,612	95.0	
Two-party-preferred result
Liberal	John Moore		63.4	−3.1
Labor	Gailene Harrison		36.6	+3.1
Liberal hold		Swing	−3.1	

==== 1975 ====
1975 Australian federal election: Ryan
Party	Candidate	Votes	%	±%
Liberal	John Moore	31,096	43.2	−14.0
Labor	Colin Taylor	22,914	31.9	−6.4
National Country	Douglas MacTaggart	14,980	20.8	+20.8
Workers	David Boughen	2,917	4.1	+4.1
Total formal votes		71,907	99.0	
Informal votes		754	1.0	
Turnout		72,661	95.6	
Two-party-preferred result
Liberal	John Moore	47,835	66.5	+6.9
Labor	Colin Taylor	24,072	33.5	−6.9
Liberal hold		Swing	+6.9	

==== 1974 ====
1974 Australian federal election: Ryan
Party	Candidate	Votes	%	±%
Liberal	Nigel Drury	39,069	57.2	+11.0
Labor	James Herlihy	26,128	38.3	−2.0
Australia	Ruth Chenoweth	3,080	4.5	−1.9
Total formal votes		68,277	98.9	
Informal votes		760	1.1	
Turnout		69,037	95.9	
Two-party-preferred result
Liberal	Nigel Drury		59.6	+5.7
Labor	James Herlihy		40.4	−5.7
Liberal hold		Swing	+5.7	

==== 1972 ====
1972 Australian federal election: Ryan
Party	Candidate	Votes	%	±%
Liberal	Nigel Drury	27,394	46.2	−3.1
Labor	John Conn	23,913	40.3	−2.1
Australia	Robert Wensley	3,811	6.4	+6.4
Democratic Labor	Bert Vann	3,371	5.7	−2.6
Independent	Alan Jones	823	1.4	+1.4
Total formal votes		59,312	98.2	
Informal votes		1,070	1.8	
Turnout		60,382	95.6	
Two-party-preferred result
Liberal	Nigel Drury		53.9	−3.2
Labor	John Conn		46.1	+3.2
Liberal hold		Swing	−3.2	

=== Elections in the 1960s ===
==== 1969 ====
1969 Australian federal election: Ryan
Party	Candidate	Votes	%	±%
Liberal	Nigel Drury	25,867	49.3	−9.9
Labor	John Conn	22,222	42.4	+11.8
Democratic Labor	Brian O'Brien	4,358	8.3	−0.5
Total formal votes		52,447	98.9	
Informal votes		576	1.1	
Turnout		53,023	95.4	
Two-party-preferred result
Liberal	Nigel Drury	29,444	57.1	−10.5
Labor	John Conn	23,003	43.9	+10.5
Liberal hold		Swing	−10.5	

==== 1966 ====
1966 Australian federal election: Ryan
Party	Candidate	Votes	%	±%
Liberal	Nigel Drury	32,283	59.6	+1.4
Labor	Donald Jeffries	16,351	30.2	−3.4
Democratic Labor	Brian O'Brien	4,788	8.8	+1.7
Independent	John Thurwall	756	1.4	+1.4
Total formal votes		54,178	98.4	
Informal votes		873	1.6	
Turnout		55,051	96.0	
Two-party-preferred result
Liberal	Nigel Drury		67.3	+1.6
Labor	Donald Jeffries		32.7	−1.6
Liberal hold		Swing	+1.6	

==== 1963 ====
1963 Australian federal election: Ryan
Party	Candidate	Votes	%	±%
Liberal	Nigel Drury	29,608	58.2	+6.0
Labor	Raymond McCreath	17,082	33.6	−6.4
Democratic Labor	Brian O'Brien	3,587	7.1	−0.8
Social Credit	Robert Hooker	588	1.2	+1.2
Total formal votes		50,865	97.6	
Informal votes		1,230	2.4	
Turnout		52,095	95.4	
Two-party-preferred result
Liberal	Nigel Drury		65.7	+7.2
Labor	Raymond McCreath		34.3	−7.2
Liberal hold		Swing	+7.2	

==== 1961 ====
1961 Australian federal election: Ryan
Party	Candidate	Votes	%	±%
Liberal	Nigel Drury	24,984	52.2	−5.8
Labor	Joy Guyatt	19,132	40.0	+10.2
Queensland Labor	Michael Long	3,771	7.9	−2.5
Total formal votes		47,887	97.5	
Informal votes		1,244	2.5	
Turnout		49,131	95.3	
Two-party-preferred result
Liberal	Nigel Drury		58.5	−8.7
Labor	Joy Guyatt		41.5	+8.7
Liberal hold		Swing	−8.7	

=== Elections in the 1950s ===
==== 1958 ====
1958 Australian federal election: Ryan
Party	Candidate	Votes	%	±%
Liberal	Nigel Drury	25,770	58.0	−2.8
Labor	Bernard McDonnell	13,232	29.8	−9.4
Queensland Labor	Bryan Hurley	4,613	10.4	+10.4
Australian Nationalist	Ronald Edmonds	795	1.8	+1.8
Total formal votes		44,410	96.7	
Informal votes		1,493	3.3	
Turnout		45,903	96.2	
Two-party-preferred result
Liberal	Nigel Drury		67.2	+6.4
Labor	Bernard McDonnell		32.8	−6.4
Liberal hold		Swing	+6.4	

==== 1955 ====
1955 Australian federal election: Ryan
Party	Candidate	Votes	%	±%
Liberal	Nigel Drury	25,306	60.8	+0.1
Labor	Norman Buchan	16,341	39.2	−0.1
Total formal votes		41,647	98.0	
Informal votes		868	2.0	
Turnout		42,515	94.7	
Liberal hold		Swing	+0.1	

==== 1954 ====
1954 Australian federal election: Ryan
Party	Candidate	Votes	%	±%
Liberal	Nigel Drury	26,140	58.5	−2.4
Labor	Frank Luton	18,514	41.5	+2.4
Total formal votes		44,654	99.0	
Informal votes		439	1.0	
Turnout		45,093	95.7	
Liberal hold		Swing	−2.4	

==== 1951 ====
1951 Australian federal election: Ryan
Party	Candidate	Votes	%	±%
Liberal	Nigel Drury	26,021	60.9	+0.6
Labor	Frank Luton	16,733	39.1	−0.6
Total formal votes		42,754	98.2	
Informal votes		783	1.2	
Turnout		43,537	93.6	
Liberal hold		Swing	+0.6	

=== Elections in the 1940s ===
==== 1949 ====
1949 Australian federal election: Ryan
Party	Candidate	Votes	%	±%
Liberal	Nigel Drury	24,917	60.3	+17.3
Labor	Leonard Eastment	16,431	39.7	−6.6
Total formal votes		41,348	98.2	
Informal votes		755	1.8	
Turnout		42,103	94.3	
Liberal notional hold		Swing	+9.2	
