= 2010 Walter Taylor Ward by-election =

Australian local by-election

| ← 2008 | 23 October 2010 | 2012 → |
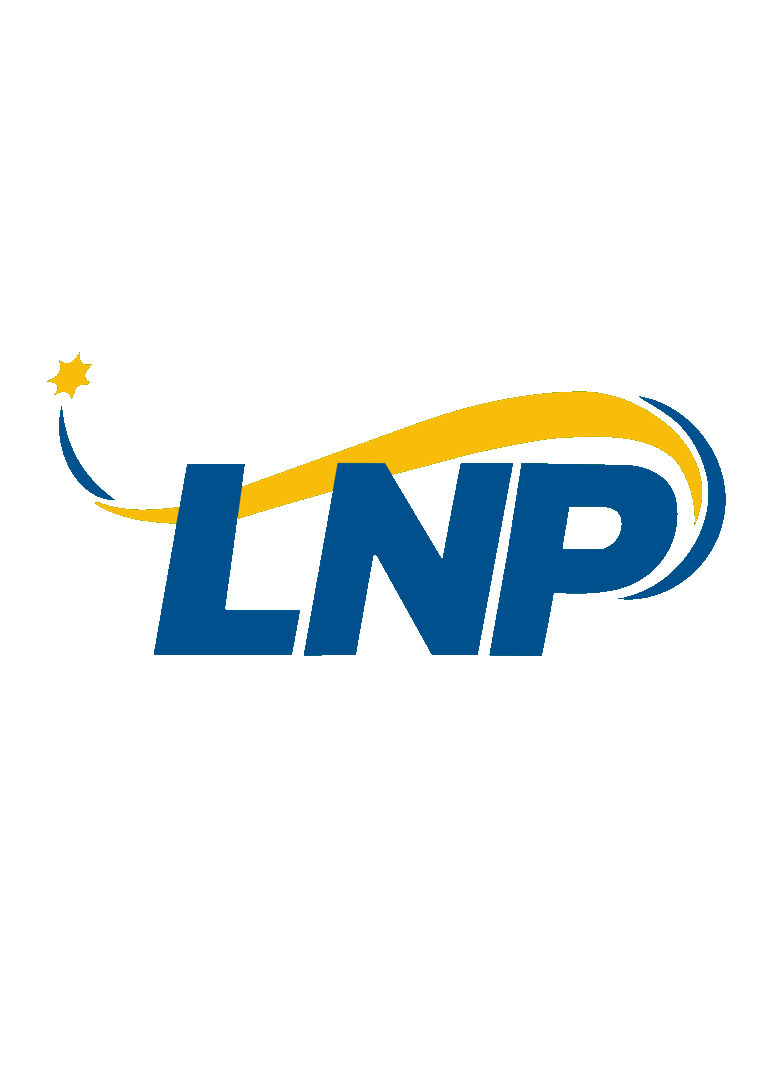

| | First party | Second party | Third party |
|---|---|---|---|
| Candidate | Julian Simmonds | Tim Dangerfield | Louise Foley |
| Party | Liberal National | Greens | Labor |
| Popular vote | 10,192 | 3,902 | 2,898 |
| Percentage | 58.5% | 22.4% | 16.6% |
| Swing | ▼5.1 | ▲7.3 | ▼4.6 |
| 2PP | 64.9% | 35.1% |
| 2PP vote | ▼6.1 | ▲35.1 |
Councillor before election
Jane Prentice
Liberal National
Elected Councillor
Julian Simmonds
Liberal National

The 2010 Walter Taylor Ward by-election was held on 23 October 2010 to elect the next councillor for the Brisbane City Council ward of Walter Taylor, following the resignation of incumbent Jane Prentice.

Prentice resigned from council on 24 August 2010 after winning the division of Ryan at the federal election. She had been re-elected for the Liberal Party at the 2008 Brisbane City Council election, and subsequently joined the Liberal National Party (LNP) when it was formed months later in July 2008.

The by-election was easily won by LNP candidate Julian Simmonds, although there was a swing against of more than 6% after preferences.

== Results ==
2010 Walter Taylor Ward by-election
| Party | Candidate | Votes | % | ±% |
|---|---|---|---|---|
| Liberal National | Julian Simmonds | 10,192 | 58.5 | −5.1 |
| Greens | Tim Dangerfield | 3,902 | 22.4 | +7.3 |
| Labor | Louise Foley | 2,898 | 16.6 | −4.6 |
| Independent | William Borbasi | 434 | 2.5 | +2.5 |
| Total formal votes | | 17,426 | | |
| Informal votes | | 270 | 1.5 | +0.2 |
| Turnout | | 17,696 | 69.6 | |
Two-party-preferred result
| Liberal National | Julian Simmonds | 10,686 | 64.9 | −6.1 |
| Greens | Tim Dangerfield | 5,775 | 35.1 | +35.1 |
| Liberal National hold | | Swing | −6.1 | |
