= 2001 Ryan by-election =

- 17 March 2001

	First party	Second party
Candidate	Leonie Short	Bob Tucker
Party	Labor	Liberal
Popular vote	29,173	32,571
Percentage	38.68%	43.19%
Swing	▲8.33	▼7.21
TPP	50.17%	49.83%
TPP swing	▲9.69	▼9.69
MP before election
John Moore
Liberal
Elected MP
Leonie Short
Labor

The 2001 Ryan by-election was held in the Australian electorate of Ryan in Queensland on 17 March 2001. The by-election was triggered by the retirement of the sitting member, the Liberal Party of Australia's John Moore, on 5 February 2001. The writ for the by-election was issued on 9 February 2001.

== Background ==
The Federal Division of Ryan had been in Liberal hands since its creation in 1949, and for most of that time had been reasonably safe for that party. However, in 1969, the Labor candidate, John Conn, employing his early version of the later famous 'It's Time' slogan, achieved a record swing in excess of 19% to almost unseat the long-time Liberal incumbent, Nigel Drury. Conn achieved a further swing to Labor in 1972, rendering the seat marginal. Subsequently, upon Drury's retirement, in the big anti-Labor swing of 1975, Liberal John Moore won Ryan and became a minister in the Fraser and Howard governments. When a Cabinet reshuffle saw him lose the Defence portfolio, Moore resigned immediately. His retirement came at a very bad time for the government. The Coalition had just been defeated in the Western Australia and Queensland state elections, and the public reaction to the GST introduced eight months earlier was still worrying the Liberals.

The Queensland election saw the re-election of the Labor Government of Peter Beattie. Ironically Beattie was Moore's Labor opponent in Ryan at the 1980 federal election in which Moore defeated Beattie.

Comparisons were drawn with the 1975 by-election in the Tasmanian electorate of Bass: both had resulted from the resignation of a Defence Minister (former Labor Deputy Prime Minister Lance Barnard in 1975). Labor's landslide loss in Bass was linked to the demise of the Whitlam government more than four months later.

The Liberals were expected to preselect Hong Kong-born lawyer Michael Johnson as their candidate for the by-election, although Johnson's Chinese heritage led to accusations of branch stacking by signing up ethnic Chinese as members of the Liberal Party. Eventually it emerged that Johnson had not properly renounced his British citizenship, and was ineligible to run as an electoral candidate in Australia.

== Results ==
Ryan by-election, 2001
Party	Candidate	Votes	%	±%
Liberal	Bob Tucker	32,571	43.19	−7.21
Labor	Leonie Short	29,173	38.68	+8.33
Greens	Mike Stasse	4,608	6.11	−2.28
Democrats	Lyn Dengate	3,808	5.05	−2.93
HEMP	Nigel Freemarijuana	1,685	2.23	+2.23
Independent	Jody Moore	1,351	1.79	+1.79
Christian Democrats	Andrew Hassall	955	1.27	+1.27
Independent	Terry Hyland	822	1.09	+1.09
Independent	Warren Stagg	440	0.58	+0.58
Total formal votes		75,413	97.04	−0.65
Informal votes		2,304	2.96	+0.65
Turnout		77,717	88.68	−5.71
Two-party-preferred result
Labor	Leonie Short	37,834	50.17	+9.69
Liberal	Bob Tucker	37,579	49.83	−9.69
Labor gain from Liberal		Swing	+9.69	

== Aftermath ==
Leonie Short won the seat for Labor in a close contest on preferences, with only 255 votes separating her from Liberal candidate Bob Tucker on a two-party basis. The loss was a huge worry for the Liberals, although Labor's electoral momentum was halted by their loss in the Aston by-election four months later.

Short contested the 2001 federal election, but was defeated by her Liberal opponent Michael Johnson, who had by then renounced his British citizenship.

== See also ==
- List of Australian federal by-elections
