= Watson Brown =

Watson Brown may refer to:

- Watson Brown (American football) (born 1950), American retired football coach
- Watson Brown (abolitionist) (1835–1859), son of the abolitionist John Brown
- Watson Brown (photographer) (born 1950), American photographer
- Elizabeth Watson-Brown (born 1956), Australian politician

== See also ==
- Watson T. Browne, English singer
