= Walter Taylor Ward =

Brisbane City Council ward

Walter Taylor Ward Queensland — Brisbane City Council
- Walter Taylor Ward, 2024
- Created: 1994
- Councillor: Penny Wolff
- Party: Liberal National
- Namesake: Walter Taylor
- Electors: 33,631 (2024)
Electorates around Walter Taylor Ward:
Pullenvale	Paddington	Paddington
Pullenvale	Walter Taylor Ward	The Gabba (across river)
Jamboree (across river)	Tennyson (across river)	Tennyson (across river)

The Walter Taylor Ward is a ward of the Brisbane City Council in Queensland, Australia. It covers Fig Tree Pocket, Indooroopilly, St Lucia, and parts of Chapel Hill, Taringa and Toowong.

== Councillors for Walter Taylor Ward ==
Image	Member	Party	Term	Notes
	June O'Connell	Liberal	26 March 1994 – 25 March 2000	Elected to Taringa Ward in 1986, ran for Walter Taylor Ward after it partially replaced Taringa Ward.
	Jane Prentice	Liberal	25 March 2000 – 26 July 2008	Resigned after winning Division of Ryan at 2010 federal election
	Jane Prentice	Liberal National	26 July 2008 – 24 August 2010	Resigned after winning Division of Ryan at 2010 federal election
	Julian Simmonds	Liberal National	23 October 2010 – 11 April 2019	Won by-election. Resigned to contest Division of Ryan at 2019 federal election.
	James Mackay	Liberal National	7 May 2019 – 20 October 2023	Appointed to fill vacancy. Resigned.
	Penny Wolff	Liberal National	24 October 2023 – present	Appointed to fill vacancy. Incumbent.

== Results ==
=== 2024 ===
2024 Queensland local elections: Walter Taylor Ward
Party	Candidate	Votes	%	±%
Liberal National	Penny Wolff	13,281	46.68	−0.22
Greens	Michaela Sargent	11,271	39.62	+4.72
Labor	Rebecca Hack	3,897	13.70	−1.60
Total formal votes		28,449	98.61	
Informal votes		402	1.39	
Turnout		28,581	85.79	
Two-candidate-preferred result
Liberal National	Penny Wolff	14,002	51.71	−2.19
Greens	Michaela Sargent	13,075	48.29	+2.19
Liberal National hold		Swing	−2.19	

=== 2020 ===
2020 Queensland local elections: Walter Taylor Ward
Party	Candidate	Votes	%	±%
Liberal National	James Mackay	10,957	46.9	−12.7
Greens	Michaela Sargent	8,147	34.9	+11.9
Labor	Karthika Raghwan	3,582	15.3	−2.1
Independent	Matt Antoniolli	684	2.9	+2.9
Total formal votes		23,370	98.3	+0.2
Informal votes		412	1.7	−0.2
Turnout		23,782	77.5	−4.1
Notional two-party-preferred count
Liberal National	James Mackay	11,878	60.6	–7.2
Labor	Karthika Raghwan	7,734	39.4	+7.2
Two-party-preferred result
Liberal National	James Mackay	11,439	53.9	−11.8
Greens	Michaela Sargent	9,766	46.1	+11.8
Liberal National hold		Swing	−11.8	

=== 2016 ===
2016 Queensland local elections: Walter Taylor Ward
Party	Candidate	Votes	%	±%
Liberal National	Julian Simmonds	14,190	60.5	−3.5
Greens	Chris Turnbull	5,354	22.8	+2.6
Labor	Talbot Speechley	3,920	16.7	+0.9
Total formal votes		23,464	98.1	−0.3
Informal votes		461	1.9	+0.3
Turnout		23,925	81.5	+2.4
Notional two-party-preferred count
Liberal National	Julian Simmonds		67.8	
Labor	Talbot Speechley		32.2	
Two-party-preferred result
Liberal National	Julian Simmonds	14,574	66.5	−7.2
Greens	Chris Turnbull	7,336	33.5	+7.2
Liberal National hold		Swing	−7.2	

=== 2012 ===
2012 Brisbane City Council election: Walter Taylor Ward (Note: Percentage change are compared to the results of the 2008 Brisbane City Council Election.)
Party	Candidate	Votes	%	±%
Liberal National	Julian Simmonds	12,497	65.5	+1.9
Greens	Tim Dangerfield	3,813	20.0	+4.8
Labor	Adam Atkins	2,769	14.5	−6.7
Total formal votes		19,079	98.4	−0.3
Informal votes		310	1.6	+0.3
Turnout		19,389	79.1	−
Notional two-party-preferred count
Liberal National	Julian Simmonds	12,939	75.5	+4.5
Labor	Adam Atkins	4,195	24.5	−4.5
Two-party-preferred result
Liberal National	Julian Simmonds	12,719	71.9	+0.9
Greens	Tim Dangerfield	4,964	28.1	+28.1
Liberal National hold		Swing	+0.9	

=== 2010 ===
2010 Walter Taylor Ward by-election
Party	Candidate	Votes	%	±%
Liberal National	Julian Simmonds	10,192	58.5	−5.1
Greens	Tim Dangerfield	3,902	22.4	+7.3
Labor	Louise Foley	2,898	16.6	−4.6
Independent	William Borbasi	434	2.5	+2.5
Total formal votes		17,426		
Informal votes		270	1.5	+0.2
Turnout		17,696	69.6	
Two-party-preferred result
Liberal National	Julian Simmonds	10,686	64.9	−6.1
Greens	Tim Dangerfield	5,775	35.1	+35.1
Liberal National hold		Swing	−6.1	

=== 2008 ===
2008 Queensland local elections: Walter Taylor Ward
Party	Candidate	Votes	%	±%
Liberal	Jane Prentice	13,164	63.7	+1.8
Labor	Ryan Ginard	4,386	21.2	−2.6
Greens	Daniel Crute	3,133	15.2	+0.9
Total formal votes		20,683	-	−
Informal votes		268	1.3	−0.1
Turnout		20,951	-	−
Two-party-preferred result
Liberal	Jane Prentice	13,519	71.0	+2.2
Labor	Ryan Ginard	5,517	29.0	−2.2
Liberal hold		Swing	+2.2	

=== 2004 ===
2004 Brisbane City Council election: Walter Taylor Ward
Party	Candidate	Votes	%	±%
Liberal	Jane Prentice	11,391	61.86	
Labor	David Kerr	4,389	23.84	
Greens	Clive Brazier	2,633	14.30	
Total formal votes		18,413	98.65	
Informal votes		252	1.35	
Turnout		18,665	85.37	
Two-party-preferred result
Liberal	Jane Prentice	11,801	68.87	
Labor	David Kerr	5,335	31.13	
Liberal hold		Swing		
