= 2001 Australian federal election =

Election for the 40th Parliament of Australia

- 10 November 2001

All 150 seats in the House of Representatives 76 seats were needed for a majority in the House 40 (of the 76) seats in the Senate
- Registered: 12,708,837 ▲4.56%
- Turnout: 12,054,664 (94.85%) (▼0.14 pp)
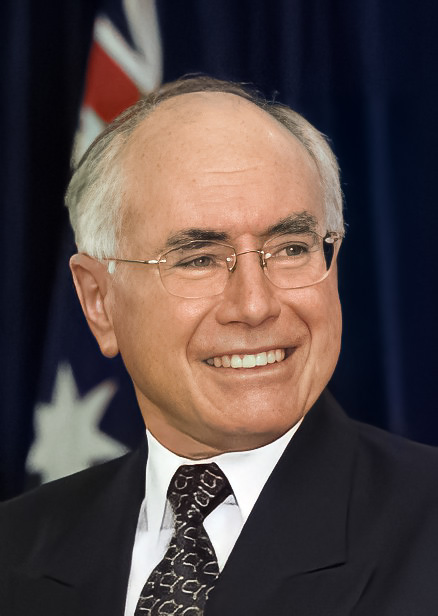

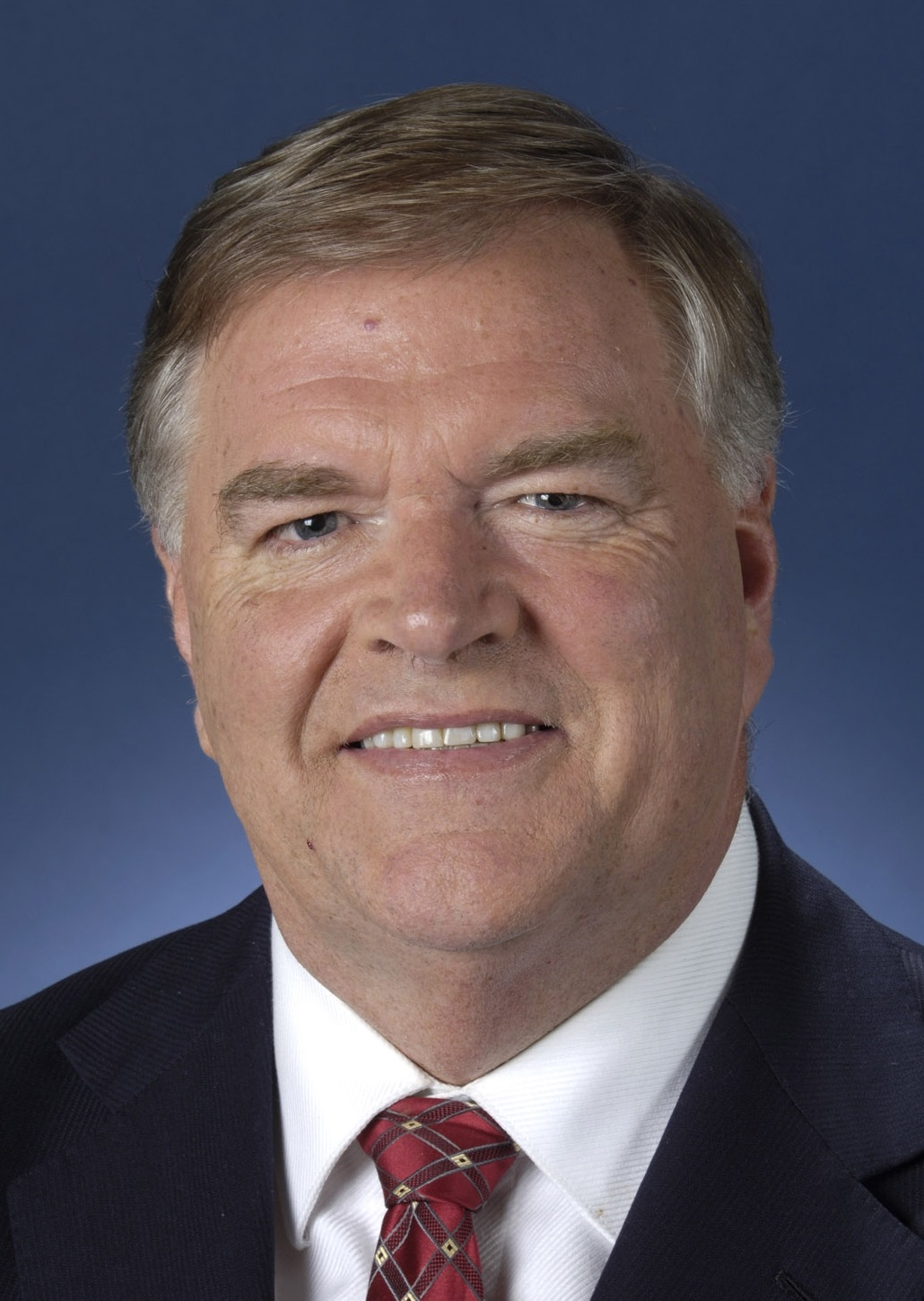
	First party	Second party
Leader	John Howard	Kim Beazley
Party	Coalition	Labor
Leader since	30 January 1995	19 March 1996
Leader's seat	Bennelong (NSW)	Brand (WA)
Last election	80 seats	67 seats
Seats won	82	65
Seat change	▲2	▼2
Primary vote	4,934,959	4,341,420
Percentage	42.92%	37.84%
Swing	▲3.41%	▼2.26%
TPP	51.03%	48.97%
TPP swing	▲2.01	▼2.01
- Results by division for the House of Representatives, shaded by winning party's margin of victory.
Prime Minister before election
John Howard
Coalition
Subsequent Prime Minister
John Howard
Coalition

A federal election was held in Australia on 10 November 2001. All 150 seats in the House of Representatives and 40 seats in the 76-member Senate were up for election. The incumbent Liberal Party of Australia led by Prime Minister of Australia John Howard and coalition partner the National Party of Australia led by John Anderson defeated the opposition Australian Labor Party led by Kim Beazley. As of 2024, this was the most recent election to feature a rematch of both major party leaders.

Future Opposition Leaders Peter Dutton and Sussan Ley entered parliament at this election.

== Background ==
ABC news report of the Tampa affair and its political context, October 2001.

Throughout much of 2001, the Coalition had been trailing Labor in opinion polls, thanks to dissatisfaction with the government's economic reform programme and high petrol prices. The opposition Australian Labor Party had won a majority of the two-party-preferred vote at the previous election and had won a series of state and territory elections. Labor also recorded positive swings in two by-elections, taking the Queensland seat of Ryan and coming close in Aston.

However following the September 11 attacks, and the Children Overboard and Tampa affairs, Polls swung strongly toward the coalition after the "Tampa" controversy but before the 11 September attacks.

In fact, voter concern with terrorism in the aftermath of the September 11 attacks in the United States was noted, with the rise in the combined primary votes of the major parties from 79.61% at the previous election in 1998, to 81.17% at this election. There would be further increases in the combined major party primary vote in 2004 and 2007.

Another major issue was the collapse of the country's second-biggest airline Ansett Australia and the question of whether it should be given a bailout. The Coalition was opposed to any bailout because the collapse was not the government's fault. However, Labor supported a bailout, because the company's collapse was about to result in the biggest mass job loss in Australian history, whilst also arguing that the government was partially responsible for allowing Ansett to be taken over by Air New Zealand, a move which had caused Ansett's failure. Although the two-party preferred result was reasonably close, the ALP recorded its lowest primary vote since 1934.

During the 2001 election campaign, Labor made a 'GST rollback' a centrepiece of its election platform. Labor attempted to reprise the effects of the birthday cake interview by deriding the application of GST to cooked and uncooked chickens, but failed to ignite public response to the limited scope of the rollbacks applying only to gas and electricity bills. Labor's 2001 election loss would effectively end all serious opposition to GST.

Political scientists have suggested that television coverage has subtly transformed the political system, with a spotlight on leaders rather than parties, thereby making for more of an American presidential-style system. In this election, television news focused on international issues, especially terrorism and asylum seekers. Minor parties were largely ignored as the two main parties monopolised the media's attention. The election was depicted as a horse-race between Howard and Beazley, with Howard running ahead and therefore being given more coverage than his Labor rival.

The election-eve Newspoll forecast that the Liberal/National Coalition would get 53 percent of the two-party-preferred vote.

== Results ==
This was the last election where the Australian Democrats were the largest third party; they would be replaced by the Australian Greens in the 2004 election.

=== House of Representatives results ===
Government (82) Coalition Liberal (68) National (13) CLP (1) Opposition (65) Labor (65) Crossbench (3) Independent (3)

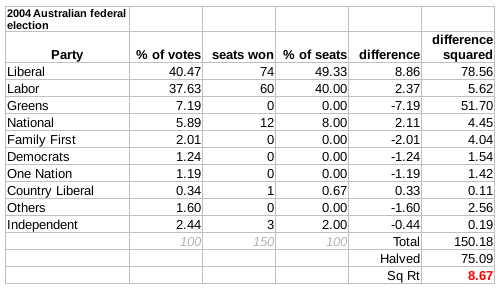
The disproportionality of the lower house in the 2004 election was 8.67 according to the Gallagher Index, mainly between the Liberal and Green Parties.

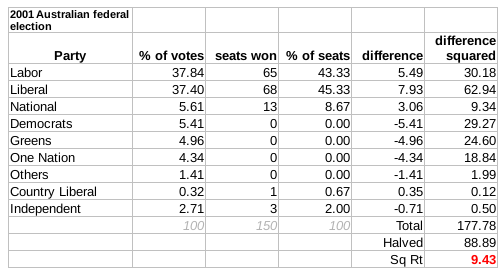
The disproportionality of the lower house in the 2001 election was 9.43 according to the Gallagher Index, mainly between the Coalition and Labor Parties.

House of Reps (IRV) — 2001–04 – Turnout 94.85% (CV) — Informal 4.82%
Party	Votes	%	Swing	Seats	Change
Liberal	4,254,071	37.08	+3.19	68	▲4
National	643,926	5.61	+0.32	13	▼3
Country Liberal	36,961	0.32	–0.00	1	▲1
Liberal–National coalition	4,934,958	43.01	+3.50	82	▲2
Labor	4,341,420	37.84	−2.26	65	▼2
Democrats	620,198	5.41	+0.28	0	Steady
Greens	569,074	4.96	+2.82	0	Steady
One Nation	498,032	4.34	−4.09	0	Steady
Independents	332,118	2.89	+1.00	3	▲2
Others	178,274	1.64		0	Steady
Total	11,474,074			150	▲2
Two-party-preferred vote
Coalition	5,846,289	50.95	+1.93	82	▲2
Labor	5,627,785	49.05	−1.93	65	▼2
Invalid/blank votes	580,591	4.82	+1.05		
Turnout	12,054,665	94.85			
Registered voters	12,708,837				
Source: AEC Tally Room

Independents: Peter Andren, Tony Windsor, Bob Katter

Popular vote
Labor	37.84%
Liberal	37.40%
National	5.61%
Democrats	5.51%
Greens	4.96%
One Nation	4.34%
CLP	0.32%
Independents	2.71%
Other	1.41%

Two-party-preferred vote
Coalition	50.95%
Labor	49.05%

Parliament seats
Coalition	54.67%
Labor	43.33%
Independents	2.00%

=== Senate results ===
Government (35) Coalition Liberal (31) National (3) CLP (1) Opposition (28) Labor (28) Crossbench (12) Democrats (8) Greens (2) One Nation (1) Independent (2)

Senate (STV GV) — Turnout 95.20% (CV) — Informal 3.89%
Party	Votes	%	Swing	Seats won	Total seats	Change
Liberal/National Coalition						
Liberal/National joint ticket	2,776,052	23.87	+2.00	6	11	Steady
Liberal	1,824,745	15.69	+2.06	12	22	Steady
National	222,860	1.92	+0.06	1	1	Steady
Country Liberal	40,680	0.35	+0.03	1	1	Steady
Coalition total	4,863,337	41.83	+4.15	20	35	Steady
Labor	3,990,997	34.32	-2.99	14	28 (Note: Shayne Murphy had resigned from the Labor Party on 2 October 2001 and served out the rest of his term as an independent.)	Steady
Democrats	843,130	7.25	-1.20	4	8	▼1
One Nation	644,364	5.54	-3.44	0	1	Steady
Greens	574,543	4.94	+2.22	2	2	▲1
Others	630,600	5.44	+0.22	0	2	Steady
Total	11,627,529			40	76	
Invalid/blank votes	470,515	3.9				
Turnout	12,098,320	95.7				
Registered voters	12,636,631					
Source: Federal Elections 1998

== House of Representatives preference flows ==
- The Nationals had candidates in 14 seats where three-cornered-contests existed, with 87.34% of preferences favouring the Liberal Party.
- The Democrats contested 145 electorates with preferences favouring Labor (64.13%).
- The Greens contested 145 electorates with preferences strongly favouring Labor (74.83%).
- One Nation contested 120 electorates with preferences slightly favouring the Liberal–National Coalition (55.87%).

== Seats changing hands ==
The following table indicates seats that changed hands from one party to another at this election. It compares the election results with the previous margins, taking into account redistributions in New South Wales, Western Australia, South Australia, Tasmania and both territories. As a result, it includes the seats of Macarthur and Parramatta, which were held by Liberal members but had notional Labor margins. The table also includes the new seat of Hasluck (retained by Labor); the abolished Northern Territory, which was divided into Lingiari (retained by Labor) and Solomon (retained by the CLP); and Paterson, a Labor seat made Liberal by the redistribution

Seat	1998			Notional margin (Note: For seats that were affected by the redistribution the Australian Electoral Commission calculated "notional" margins for the redistributed divisions by modelling the outcome of the previous election as if the new boundaries had been in place.)	Swing	2001		
Seat	Party	Member	Margin	Notional margin		Margin	Member	Party
Ballarat, Vic	Liberal	Michael Ronaldson	2.77		5.50	2.73	Catherine King	Labor
Canning, WA	Labor	Jane Gerick	3.52	0.04	0.42	0.38	Don Randall	Liberal
Dickson, Qld	Labor	Cheryl Kernot	0.12		6.09	5.97	Peter Dutton	Liberal
Dobell, NSW	Labor	Michael Lee	3.35	1.53	1.91	0.38	Ken Ticehurst	Liberal
Farrer, NSW (Note: Margin is over Labor.)	National	Tim Fischer	14.62	14.18	N/A	16.37	Sussan Ley	Liberal
Hasluck, WA	Labor	New seat		2.55	–0.77	1.78	Sharryn Jackson	Labor
Kennedy, Qld	National	Bob Katter	11.19		N/A	19.69	Bob Katter	Independent
Lingiari, NT	Labor	New seat		3.53	1.76	5.29	Warren Snowdon	Labor
Macarthur, NSW	Liberal	John Fahey	5.63	–1.69 (Note: Macarthur had become a notional Labor seat as a result of the redistribution.)	8.65	6.96	Pat Farmer	Liberal
New England, NSW	National	Stuart St. Clair	13.66		N/A	8.30	Tony Windsor	Independent
Northern Territory	Labor	Warren Snowdon	0.57	District abolished				
Parramatta, NSW	Liberal	Ross Cameron	1.07	–2.49 (Note: Parramatta had become a notional Labor seat as a result of the redistribution.)	3.64	1.15	Ross Cameron	Liberal
Paterson, NSW	Labor	Bob Horne	1.22	–1.26 (Note: Patersonhad become a notional Liberal seat as a result of the redistribution.)		1.42	Bob Baldwin	Liberal
Solomon, NT	Country Liberal	New seat		2.24	–2.15	0.09	Dave Tollner	Country Liberal
Ryan, Qld	Liberal	John Moore	9.52		−0.90	8.62	Michael Johnson	Liberal
Ryan, Qld	Labor	Leonie Short (Note: John Moore (Liberal) had won Ryan at the 1998 election, however he resigned in 2001 and Leonie Short (Labor) won the seat at the resulting by-election.)	0.17		9.69	8.62	Michael Johnson	Liberal

== See also ==
- Candidates of the 2001 Australian federal election
- Members of the Australian House of Representatives, 2001–2004
- Members of the Australian Senate, 2002–2005
