= Watson T. Browne =

English singer

- Genres: Soul, R&B, pop
- Occupation: Musician
- Instrument: Vocals
- Years active: 1960s–present
- Label: President Records

Watson T. Browne is an English singer, who was once the lead singer of the 1960s group The Explosive, and he released some recordings as Watson T. Browne & The Explosive. He had a hit in the 1980s with "Searching for a Star". He also had a hit in Scandinavia with "I'm on the Road Again".

== Biography ==
The early days of Browne's career were in the Abbey Road Studios. His early recordings appeared on the Bell, Decca and President labels. He later moved to Europe and had a long career there. He has also lived in Tel Aviv, Israel. There, he collaborated with Israeli band, The Fat & The Thin, and sung lead on side one of their single with "I Say A Little Prayer" in 1972. After time having lived in Italy and Germany, he returned to the UK, where he now lives.

Among the recordings he has made, he had success with "Searching for a Star", "I'm on the Road Again" and "Some Loving", which sold well in the United States. "Searching for a Star" appeared on Ulli Wengers One Hit Wonder Vol. 3 compilation album.

== Discography ==
=== Singles ===
==== Watson T. Browne and the Explosive ====
- "Some Loving" / "Home Is Where Your Heart Lies" – President PT207 – 1968
- "Crying All Night" / "I Close My Eyes" – President PT221 – 1968

==== The Fat & The Thin featuring Watson T Brown ====
- "I Say A Little Prayer" / "What Is Gonna Happen To Me" – Hed-Arzi 45-604 – 1972 (Israel)

==== Watson T. Browne ====
- "Some Lovin'" / "Home Is Where Your Heart Lies" – Okeh 7320 – 1969
- "Little Loving" / "Lookin' For A Rainbow" – Jupiter Records 6.14001 AC
- "I'm on the Road Again" / "Feeling Bad" MAM 16
- "Without You" / "God Made His Children" – MAM 40
- "Searching for a Star" / "Brother of Mine" – RCA PB 5640
- "Somebody's Changing My Sweet Baby's Mind" / "What Can I Do" – Seven Sun SSUN 2 – 1972
- "Save The Last Dance For Me / Will You Love Me Tomorrow" – Bell 1109 – 1970

=== Albums ===
==== Watson T. Browne ====
- The Best of Watson T Browne

=== Compilation albums ===
- Hide and Seek: British Blue Eyed Soul 1964–1969 – "I Close My Eyes" – Watson T. Browne & The Explosive
- Ulli Wengers One Hit Wonder Vol. 3 – Watson T. Browne – "Searching for a Star"
