= Michael Johnson (Australian politician) =

Australian politician

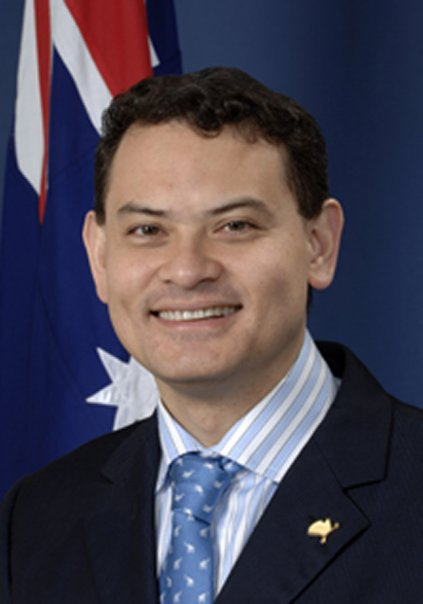
- Official portrait, 2009

Member of the Australian Parliament for Ryan
- In office 10 November 2001 – 21 August 2010
- Preceded by: Leonie Short
- Succeeded by: Jane Prentice

Liberal Party Whip
- In office 12 February 2008 – 26 February 2010 Serving with Nola Marino
- Preceded by: Joanna Gash
- Succeeded by: Patrick Secker

Personal details
- Born: 31 January 1970 (age 56) British Hong Kong
- Party: Liberal (2001–2008); Liberal National (2008-2010); Independent (2010)
- Spouse: Huyen
- Children: Ryan
- Education: University of Queensland; University of Cambridge; University of Birmingham
- Profession: Barrister, politician

Michael Andrew Johnson (born 31 January 1970) is a Hong Kong-born Australian former politician who was a member of the House of Representatives for the seat of Ryan in Queensland from 2001 to 2010, representing the Liberal Party from November 2001 to May 2010 and then as an independent from May 2010 until he was defeated by Liberal National member Jane Prentice at the 2010 federal election.

== Early years and education ==
He was born in Hong Kong to a British father and a Chinese mother, and was educated at St. Peters Lutheran College and later at the University of Queensland, the University of Cambridge, where he obtained an MPhil, and the University of Birmingham, where he obtained an Master of International Studies. He was the Australian Chevening Scholar in 1994, the Charles Hawker Memorial Scholar in 1996 and was a 2004 graduate of Harvard Kennedy School’s Executive Leaders’ Program at Harvard.

Johnson was a barrister and a university tutor and lecturer before entering politics. He was named in 2007 as a Young Global Leader (YGL) by the Geneva-based World Economic Forum (WEF). He was Chairman of the Australia-China Business Forum, and was a Member of the Asia Society's International Advisory Board and sits on the Australian Advisory Board.

== Political career ==
In February 2001, Johnson first sought to gain Liberal endorsement for Ryan, following the retirement of long-serving member, John Moore. Factional rivalries between Johnson and other candidates for preselection led to rampant branch stacking. Johnson had been expected to win preselection, having arranged many of the new members in local branches. He was accused by opponents in the party of signing up ethnic Chinese with only limited connections to the Liberal Party, many from outside the Ryan electorate, and in at least one case, outside Australia. Unfortunately for Johnson, it was revealed he had failed to properly renounce his British citizenship and was ruled ineligible to contest preselection per Section 44 (Note: Section 44 states: 'Any person who...is a citizen of a foreign power...shall be incapable of being chosen or of sitting as a...member of the House of Representatives.' "Commonwealth of Australia Constitution Act". Federal Register of Legislation. 29 July 1977.) of the Australian Constitution. Former state Liberal President Bob Tucker won preselection for the by-election, losing that contest to Labor's Leonie Short. However, by the time of the federal election in October, Johnson had sorted out his citizenship and won Liberal preselection. He then easily took the seat back from Short on an eight-point swing.

There have also been public allegations regarding internal party funds, what he describes as his "unorthodox" fundraising of asking businesses for fees for introductions he facilitates in his capacity as an MP, and the alleged improper use of a publicly funded vehicle.

Johnson also held the position of Opposition Whip in the federal Liberal Party from February 2008 to February 2010. He resigned from the post when allegations that he had misused his taxpayer-funded vehicle were investigated.

=== Expulsion from the LNP ===
In 2010, controversy emerged regarding business dealings involving Johnson and the Australia-China Business Forum, of which he was the Chair. On 20 May 2010, he was expelled from the Liberal National Party, the Queensland branch of the Liberal and National parties. Johnson vowed to contest Ryan as an independent at the 2010 federal election. In June 2010, Jane Prentice, a Brisbane City Councillor, was chosen by the LNP to stand for Ryan.

On 2 June 2010, Johnson read out a letter to Parliament which he sent to the Australian Federal Police alleging he was subject to "illegal pressure" to resign from Federal Parliament by the Liberal National Party President Bruce McIver, during a meeting on 25 February in Canberra. During the meeting, Johnson claimed that McIver produced a large black folder which he alleged contained material and documents that was evidence of alleged criminal behaviour by Johnson. McIver denies the claims that he asked him to resign from Parliament, though openly admits he asked Johnson to quit the LNP.

=== Independent election attempts ===
He stood unsuccessfully as an independent candidate in:

- the 2010 federal election, where he campaigned to retain his seat of Ryan after being expelled from the LNP earlier that year. He secured less than 9% of the primary vote and the seat was retaken by the LNP, with the new member being Jane Prentice.
- the 2020 Queensland state election, where he stood for the seat of Maiwar. He scored less than 1% of first preference votes, and the seat was retained by Greens MP Michael Berkman.

== Post-politics and personal life ==
Johnson lives in Brisbane's western suburbs with his wife Huyen and their son, named Ryan, the name of his then electorate, who was born in June 2006.

Parliament of Australia
Preceded by Leonie Short	Member for Ryan; 2001–2010	Succeeded by Jane Prentice
