= Leonie Short =

Australian politician (born 1956)

Member of the Australian Parliament for Ryan
- In office 17 March 2001 – 10 November 2001
- Preceded by: John Moore
- Succeeded by: Michael Johnson

Personal details
- Born: 1 January 1956 (age 70) Gresford, New South Wales, Australia
- Party: Labor (since 1981)
- Occupation: Dental therapist

Leonie Marjorie Short (born 1 January 1956) is an Australian former politician who a member of the Australian House of Representatives for eight months in 2001, representing the western Brisbane seat of Ryan for the Australian Labor Party. Short was elected on 17 March 2001 at a by-election following the resignation of John Moore in what was normally a safe Liberal seat.

The Liberals' preferred candidate, Michael Johnson, was unable to stand because he had not renounced his British citizenship. Short defeated former state Liberal president Bob Tucker, with a swing of 9.59%. Issues such as the introduction of the GST, and increased petrol and beer prices, dominated the by-election. The seat reverted to the Liberals at the general election in November 2001, in which Short was defeated by Michael Johnson.

Short has a Bachelor of Arts and a Masters of Health Planning, and is a registered dental therapist. Following her time in parliament, she worked at Teachers Union Health and DRUG ARM. She then helped establish Australia's first new Dental School in 57 years at Griffith University on the Gold Coast. She is currently associate professor of Oral Health at Central Queensland University in Rockhampton. She has published numerous articles in professional journals and has been awarded over $1m in competitive research grants. She is a life member of the Australian Dental and Oral Health Therapists' Association, an Associate Fellow of the Australian College of Health Service Executives, and a member of the Australian Institute of Company Directors.

Parliament of Australia
Preceded by John Moore	Member for Ryan; 2001	Succeeded by Michael Johnson
