= Elizabeth Watson-Brown =

Australian politician

Adjunct Professor Elizabeth Watson-Brown MP FRAIA
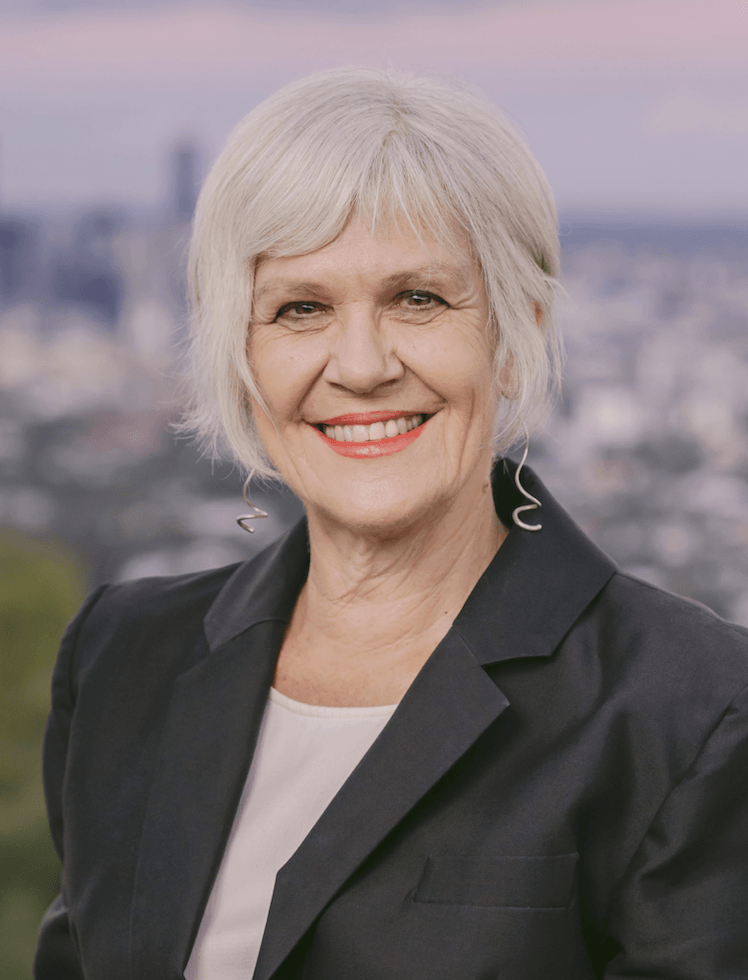

Member of the Australian Parliament for Ryan
- Incumbent
- Assumed office 21 May 2022
- Preceded by: Julian Simmonds

Personal details
- Born: 12 October 1956 (age 70) Brisbane, Queensland, Australia
- Party: Greens
- Education: University of Queensland
- Occupation: Architect
- Website: elizabethwatsonbrown.com

Elizabeth Watson-Brown (born 12 October 1956) is an Australian politician and architect. She is a member of the Australian Greens and has served in the House of Representatives since the 2022 federal election, representing the Queensland seat of Ryan.

Ever since the 2025 federal election, she has been the only member of the House of Representatives to represent the Greens.

== Architectural career ==
Watson-Brown's architecture career focused on sustainable design, greening cities, urban resilience, accessibility, and social equity. The first house she designed was the Ngungun House on the Sunshine Coast, which was designed and built in the 1990s. She practised in Tasmania before moving back to Queensland and designing her first house. She helped design the 443 Queen Street development in Brisbane. The residential tower, which has been described as "sub-tropical", was the first residential building in Australia to be given a 6 Star Green Star rating by the Green Building Council of Australia. Watson-Brown is an adjunct professor of architecture at the University of Queensland, a life fellow of the Australian Institute of Architects, has been Queensland State Awards director and National Awards juror, and has held many other design advisory and jury roles.

== Politics ==
Watson-Brown was elected as the member for the Division of Ryan, Queensland, in the 2022 Australian federal election, defeating Julian Simmonds to win the previously safe Liberal National seat. She is the first woman to represent the Greens in the lower house, as well as the only Greens member of the House of Representatives following the 2025 Australian federal election.

== Personal life ==
As of 2022 Watson-Brown lives in St Lucia and has run her own architectural business in Western Brisbane for 21 years.

== Electoral history ==
House of Representatives
Year	Electorate	Party	First preference result				Two candidate result			
Year	Electorate	Party	Votes	%	±%	Position	Votes	%	±%	Result
2022	Ryan	Greens	30,003	30.21	▲9.86	Second	52,286	52.65	▲52.65	Elected
2025	Ryan	Greens	29,986	29.0%	▼1.23	Second	55,112	53.27	▲0.62	Elected

Parliament of Australia
Preceded by Julian Simmonds	Member for Ryan; 2022–present	Incumbent
