= Julian Simmonds =

Australian politician (born 1985)

Member of the Australian Parliament for Ryan
- In office 18 May 2019 – 21 May 2022
- Preceded by: Jane Prentice
- Succeeded by: Elizabeth Watson-Brown

Personal details
- Born: Julian Graham John Simmonds; 29 August 1985 (age 41) Brisbane, Queensland, Australia
- Party: Liberal / LNP
- Education: University of Queensland
- Occupation: Politician

Julian Graham John Simmonds (born 29 August 1985) is a former Australian politician who was a member of the House of Representatives for one term from the 2019 federal election, representing the Division of Ryan in Queensland, until his defeat at the 2022 Australian federal election. He is a member of the Liberal National Party of Queensland and sat with the Liberal Party in federal parliament. He previously served on the Brisbane City Council from 2010 to 2019.

== Early life ==
Simmonds was born in Brisbane, Queensland. He holds the degrees of Bachelor of Arts and Master of Journalism from the University of Queensland.

== Politics ==
=== Local government ===
Simmonds was elected to Brisbane City Council at a by-election in 2010, representing Walter Taylor Ward for the LNP. He was re-elected at the 2012 and 2016 local elections. Simmonds served as chair of the committees for public and active transport (2011–2012), finance, economic development and administration (2012–2016), and city planning (2016–2018). In his final speech to council in March 2019 he recalled there were "not many jobs that would give a 26-year-old the chance to help manage a $3 billion dollar budget". He resigned as a councillor in April 2019 to contest the upcoming federal election and was succeeded by James Mackay.

=== Federal politics ===
In May 2018, Simmonds defeated the sitting member Jane Prentice for LNP preselection in the Division of Ryan. He won the vote by 256 votes to 103, in what The Courier-Mail described as "a bitter preselection battle". He retained Ryan for the LNP at the 2019 election with a small negative swing. Simmonds was the Chair of the Parliamentary Joint Committee on Law Enforcement.

Simmonds lost his seat in the Division of Ryan during the 2022 federal election to the Australian Greens candidate Elizabeth Watson-Brown with a 10% negative swing against him. On 26 May 2022, Simmonds conceded losing the electorate of Ryan. Simmonds is a member of the centre-right faction.

In May 2024, Simmonds started political advertising under the "Australians for Prosperity" brand. Simmonds has used "Australians for Prosperity" to run billboard campaigns against Green and Teal candidates who defeated sitting Liberal candidates at the 2022 federal election, including in his former seat of Ryan, leading the Teals to call for truth in election advertising laws.

== Business ==
Simmonds' wife Madeline Simmonds works as a communications manager for Bowen River Utilities, the proponent of the proposed Urannah Dam in Queensland. Companies linked to the dam have donated more than A$150,000 to the LNP.

Parliament of Australia
Preceded by Jane Prentice	Member for Ryan; 2019–2022	Succeeded by Elizabeth Watson-Brown
