= Nigel Drury =

Australian politician

Nigel Drury CBE
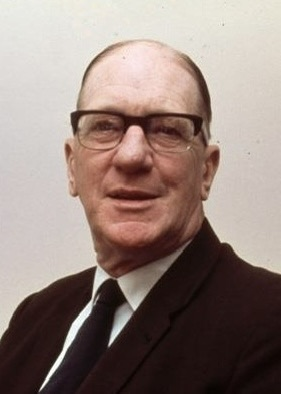

Member of the Australian Parliament for Ryan
- In office 10 December 1949 – 11 November 1975
- Preceded by: New seat
- Succeeded by: John Moore

Personal details
- Born: 15 May 1911 Clifton, Queensland
- Died: 17 May 1984 (aged 73)
- Party: Liberal Party of Australia
- Occupation: Accountant

Edward Nigel Drury CBE (15 May 1911 – 17 May 1984) was an Australian politician and grandson of Colonel Edward Robert Drury, pastoralist, business man, the first CEO of the Queensland National Bank, and a member of the family well known in Brisbane at the end of the 19th century.

Drury was born in Clifton, Queensland and was educated at Brisbane Grammar School before becoming a corporate accountant. He served in the military from 1942 to 1946 and was on the Queensland State Executive of the Liberal Party on his return. In 1949, he was elected to the Australian House of Representatives as the Liberal member for the new seat of Ryan. In the same year, he married Valerie Thomas, daughter of the Naval Officer in Charge of Brisbane during the Second World War, Captain E P Thomas.

During his parliamentary career, he was chairman of the Commonwealth Immigration Planning Council, a deputy Speaker of the House of Representatives, chairman of the Privileges Committee, and for many years deputy chairman of committees of the House. He held the seat of Ryan through 11 elections, until his retirement in 1975. Drury died in 1984 and was buried in Toowong Cemetery.

His son Dr. Christopher Drury served as the Australian Electoral Officer for South Australia from 2001 until 2011.

Parliament of Australia
Preceded by New seat	Member for Ryan; 1949 – 1975	Succeeded by John Moore
