= Jane Prentice =

Australian politician

The Honourable Jane Prentice
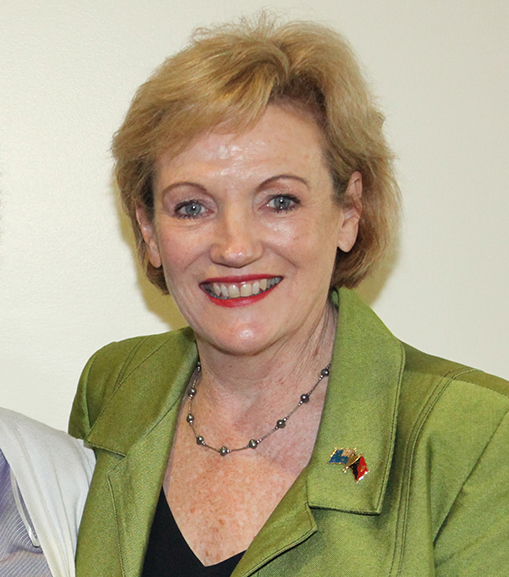
- Prentice in 2014

Member of the Australian Parliament for Ryan
- In office 21 August 2010 – 11 April 2019
- Preceded by: Michael Johnson
- Succeeded by: Julian Simmonds

Assistant Minister for Social Services and Disability Services
- In office 18 February 2016 – 24 August 2018
- Prime Minister: Malcolm Turnbull
- Preceded by: Jenny Macklin (2013)
- Succeeded by: Sarah Henderson

Personal details
- Born: Jane Righetti; 22 June 1953 (age 73) Melbourne, Victoria, Australia
- Party: Liberal / LNP
- Spouse: Ian Prentice (m. 1977)
- Occupation: Business owner
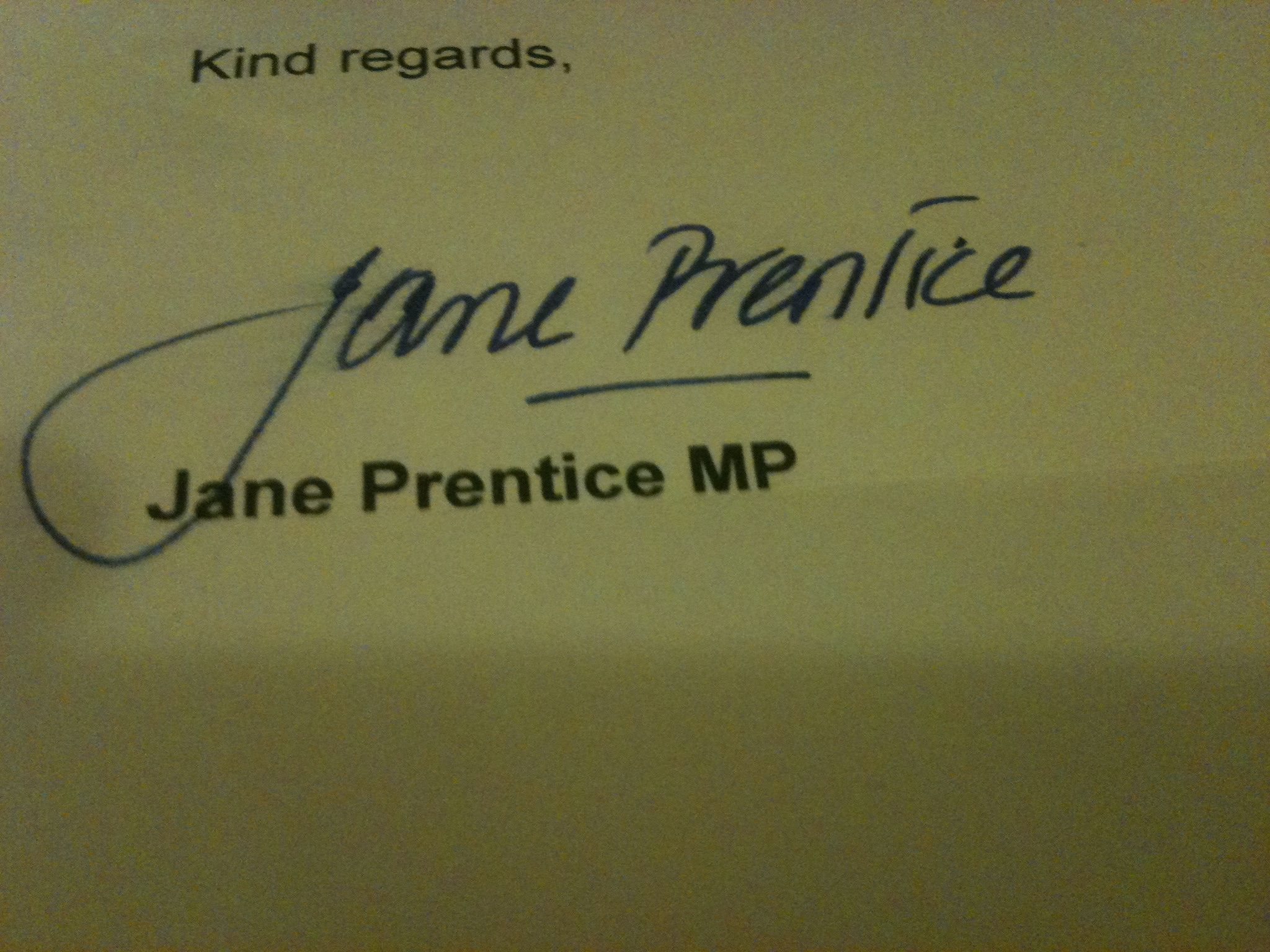
- Signature
- Website: LNP web site

Jane Prentice (née Righetti; born 22 June 1953) is a former Australian politician who served as a member of the House of Representatives from 2010 to 2019, representing the Division of Ryan in Queensland. She previously served on the Brisbane City Council from 2000 to 2010. She is a member of the Liberal National Party of Queensland and sat with the Liberal Party in federal parliament.

== Early career ==
Prentice was born in Melbourne on 22 June 1953. She is one of two daughters born to Janet (née Ellison) and Alan Righetti. Her mother was the granddaughter of George Pearce, a long-serving federal cabinet minister. Her father, of Swiss-Italian descent, was a Royal Australian Air Force (RAAF) pilot in World War II, and spent two years as a prisoner of war after being shot down in Libya.

Prentice spent her early years in north-east Victoria where her father farmed sheep with two of his brothers. The family moved to Sydney in 1960, where her father became a technical education instructor at the School of Sheep and Wool and later worked for Allied Feed Mills and Inghams.

Prentice holds qualifications from the Australian Institute of Company Directors and Australian Institute of Management. She established an event management company in Brisbane in the early 1980s. She also worked as director of the Visitors and Convention Bureau in Brisbane, business manager at the Australian Telecommunications User Group, and managing director of Conventions Queensland.

== Politics ==
While living in Sydney, Prentice was a state vice-president of the Young Liberals and chairman of its Mosman branch. She served on the New South Wales state executive of the Liberal Party from 1976 to 1977 and was also a staffer for Liberal senator John Carrick. After moving to Queensland, she chaired the party's Taringa branch.

=== Brisbane City Council ===
Prentice was a councillor on the Liberal-controlled Brisbane City Council from 2000 to 2010, representing Walter Taylor Ward.

=== Member of Parliament ===
At the 2010 federal election, Prentice comfortably defeated sitting local member, Michael Johnson, who was expelled from the Liberal Party in May 2010 for allegedly bringing the party into disrepute, having used his political position and entitlements to further his business interests and those of a company set up almost exclusively to fund his prolific overseas travel.

On 26 February 2014, Prentice tabled in the house a petition organised by the Pharmacy Guild of Australia in response to proposed changes to Pharmaceutical Benefits Scheme and the impact on community pharmacies. This petition, signed by 1,210,471 people, is the largest petition ever received by the Australian parliament. Prentice also delivered the first speech in the House of Representatives to include Auslan.

Prentice was appointed Assistant Minister for Disability Services in February 2016, as a member of the First Turnbull Ministry. Following a reshuffle after the July 2016 federal election, her title was changed to Assistant Minister for Social Services and Disability Services. She did not retain her position when Turnbull was replaced as prime minister by Scott Morrison in August 2018.

In May 2018, she was defeated for LNP preselection to recontest her seat at the 2019 Australian federal election by Julian Simmonds, a member of the Brisbane City Council.

== Personal life ==
Prentice had two children with her husband Ian Prentice, whom she married in 1977. He was a barrister by profession who also served in the Queensland Legislative Assembly in the early 1980s.

Parliament of Australia
Preceded by Michael Johnson	Member for Ryan; 2010–2019	Succeeded by Julian Simmonds
Political offices
New ministerial post	Assistant Minister for Social Services and Disability Services; 2016–2018	Succeeded by Sarah Henderson
