= John Moore (Australian politician) =

Australian politician (1936–2025)

The Honourable John Moore AO
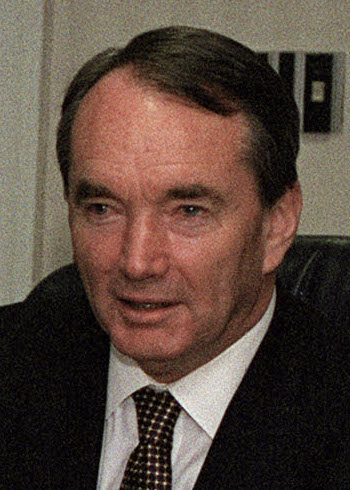
- Moore in 1999

Minister for Defence
- In office 21 October 1998 – 30 January 2001
- Prime Minister: John Howard
- Preceded by: Ian McLachlan
- Succeeded by: Peter Reith

Vice-President of the Executive Council
- In office 11 March 1996 – 21 October 1998
- Prime Minister: John Howard
- Preceded by: Gary Johns
- Succeeded by: David Kemp

Minister for Industry, Science and Tourism
- In office 11 March 1996 – 21 October 1998
- Prime Minister: John Howard
- Preceded by: Peter Cook
- Succeeded by: Nick Minchin

Minister for Business and Consumer Affairs
- In office 3 November 1980 – 20 April 1982
- Prime Minister: Malcolm Fraser
- Preceded by: Sir Victor Garland
- Succeeded by: Neil Brown

Member of the Australian Parliament for Ryan
- In office 13 December 1975 – 5 February 2001
- Preceded by: Nigel Drury
- Succeeded by: Leonie Short

Personal details
- Born: John Colinton Moore; 16 November 1936 Rockhampton, Queensland, Australia
- Died: 22 January 2025 (aged 88) Indooroopilly, Queensland, Australia
- Party: Liberal
- Spouse: Johnnie
- Education: University of Queensland

John Colinton Moore, AO (16 November 1936 – 22 January 2025) was an Australian politician. He was a Liberal member of the House of Representatives for over 25 years, serving between 1975 and 2001, and was a minister in the Fraser and Howard governments.

== Background ==
Moore was born in Rockhampton, Queensland on 16 November 1936. He was raised on a cattle station west of Bowen. His early education was through the Australian correspondence system used for isolated families. He finished his secondary education at The Armidale School, an Anglican boarding school for boys, before entering the University of Queensland and graduating with a Bachelor of Commerce with additional study in Accounting.

== Early career ==
Before he entered politics, Moore had a career as a businessman and stock broker. He spent four years (1960–1963) with A.R. Walker & Co. before forming his own brokerage (John Moore & Company) in 1964. He was a member of the Brisbane Stock Exchange from 1961 until 1974. He grew his firm into the largest single trader business in Queensland, opening offices in regional centres there and in New South Wales.

He also held directorship or board membership in a number of Australian companies, such as Brandt Limited and Phillips. He was a board member of the Australian subsidiary of multinational investment firms including Merrill and Citigroup. Moore was appointed to the Council of The Australian National University in 1971, and served as a Councillor until 1976.

Moore became a member of the Liberal Party in 1964, and by 1966 was serving in its state Executive Committee in Queensland. He was President of the Queensland Party twice; from 1973 to 1976 and again from 1984 to 1990. By party rules this also made him a member of the Federal Executive Committee (FEC) of the party. He served on the FEC in one role or another for almost thirty years.

== Political career ==
=== Fraser government ===
Moore was elected to the House of Representatives for the Division of Ryan in Brisbane at the 1975 federal election. His first ministerial office was during the fourth Fraser government, when he was Minister for Business and Consumer Affairs from 1980 to 1982. He was forced to resign from this portfolio when it was shown that fellow minister Michael MacKellar had brought a television into Australia without paying customs duty and that Moore as the minister responsible for Customs had failed to adequately respond to a report of the incident.

=== Opposition ===
While the Labor governments of Bob Hawke and Paul Keating were in power from 1983 to 1996, Moore served in the opposition's Shadow Cabinet for several key ministries including Finance, Industry and Commerce, and Communications.

In 1985 Liberal leader Andrew Peacock chose Moore to challenge deputy Liberal leader John Howard but Howard retained the position beating Moore in a vote by Liberal party room members. This led to Peacock resigning as leader and Howard elected in his place. Moore again contested the deputy leadership now vacated by Howard's elevation as leader but the position was ultimately won by Neil Brown.

=== Howard government ===
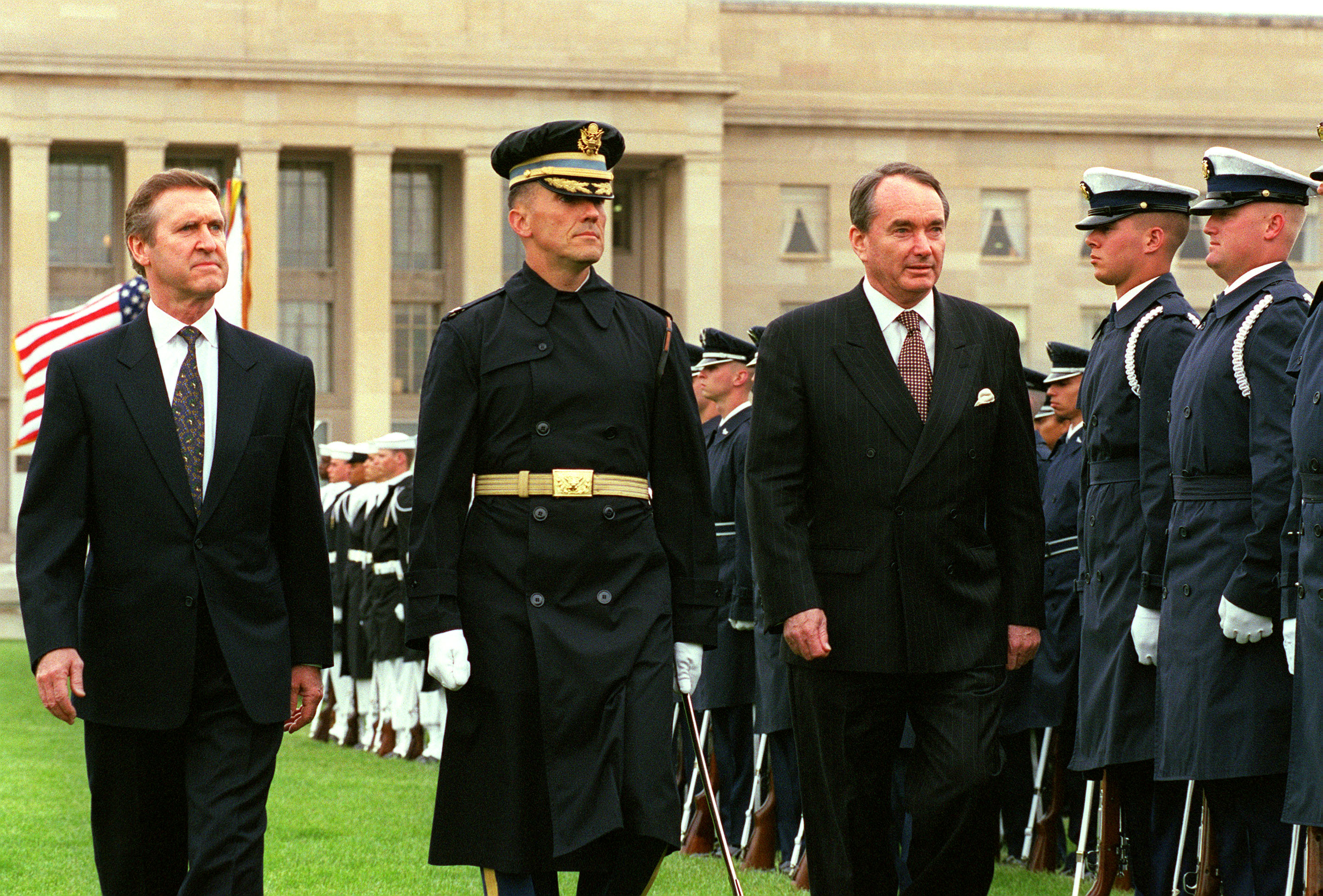
Moore (second from left) inspecting a joint honour guard at the Pentagon in 1999 with U.S. Secretary of Defense William S. Cohen (left)

When the 1996 election saw the Coalition return to power, Moore was appointed to the Cabinet in the new Howard government, as Minister for Industry, Science and Tourism and Vice-President of the Executive Council. In this position Moore had a major role in shaping new government policies affecting the motor vehicle and pharmaceutical industries. In cooperation with industrial leaders, he created a long range policy package, "Investing for Growth."

In 1996, Moore came close to being forced to resign from a ministry for the second time in his career, when it was discovered that his share holdings included significant investments that could potentially create a conflict of interest with his ministerial portfolio. These investments breached the Howard government's ministerial code of conduct, but Moore was allowed to stay on.

After the 1998 Australian federal election, Moore was appointed Minister for Defence. The most significant events during this period were the deployment of forces to East Timor as a part of the U.N. peace-keeping effort and the upgrade and operationalisation of the Collins Class Submarine Fleet. Famously, Moore had a falling out with the Secretary of the Department of Defence, Paul Barratt, resulting in the termination of Barratt's employment contract.

Within the Australian Defence Force, Moore wrote the white paper Defence 2000: Our Future Defence Force, released late in his ministry. Howard said: "The Defence White Paper is the most far-sighted reshaping of Australia's defence capability in a generation. It would not have been possible without John Moore's determination to improve management within Defence and also win new resources for the ADF".

During the Second Howard Ministry, Howard reorganised Cabinet, and appointed Peter Reith as the Minister for Defence, with effect from January 2001. Moore therefore left Cabinet as Howard did not move him to another portfolio. Moore then resigned his seat in Parliament in February 2001. His resignation came at a bad time for the government, and in the subsequent 2001 Ryan by-election Labor took the normally comfortably safe Liberal seat.

In 2015, Moore and three other former MPs brought a case before the High Court of Australia, purporting that reductions to their retirement allowances and limitations on the number of "domestic return trips per year" under the Members of Parliament (Life Gold Pass) Act 2002 was unconstitutional under S51(xxxi) of the Constitution of Australia. They lost the case in 2016, with the court finding that Parliament was entitled to vary the terms of allowances.

== Later life ==
John Moore died on 22 January 2025, at the age of 88, at the Berlasco Court Caring Centre, Indooroopilly. A state funeral was held on 4 February 2025 at Christ Church in St Lucia, Queensland.

== Honours ==
Moore was appointed an Officer of the Order of Australia in 2004 for service to the community through the Australian Parliament, to the development of strategic industry policy, and to both policy and management reform in the defence sector.

Political offices
Preceded by Sir Victor Garland	Minister for Business and Consumer Affairs; 1980–82	Succeeded by Neil Brown
Preceded by Peter Cook	Minister for Industry, Science and Tourism; Minister for Industry, Science and Technology; 1996–98	Succeeded by Nick Minchin
Preceded by Gary Johns	Vice-President of the Executive Council; 1996–98	Succeeded by David Kemp
Preceded by Ian McLachlan	Minister for Defence; 1998–2001	Succeeded by Peter Reith
Parliament of Australia
Preceded by Nigel Drury	Member for Ryan; 1975–2001	Succeeded by Leonie Short
