= Division of Ryan =

Australian federal electoral division

Coordinates: 27.470°S 152.851°E

Ryan Australian House of Representatives Division
- Interactive map of boundaries since the 2019 federal election
- Created: 1949
- MP: Elizabeth Watson-Brown
- Party: Greens
- Namesake: T. J. Ryan
- Electors: 111,363 (2022)
- Area: 370 km^{2} (142.9 sq mi)
- Demographic: Outer metropolitan
Electorates around Ryan:
Blair	Dickson	Lilley
Blair	Ryan	Brisbane; Griffith
Blair	Oxley	Moreton

The Division of Ryan is an Australian electoral division in the state of Queensland. It is west of Brisbane, comprising parts of the City of Brisbane and City of Moreton Bay.

Since 2022 its MP has been Elizabeth Watson-Brown of the Greens. Following the 2025 federal election, Watson-Brown remained as the sole Greens MP in the Australian House of Representatives.

== History ==
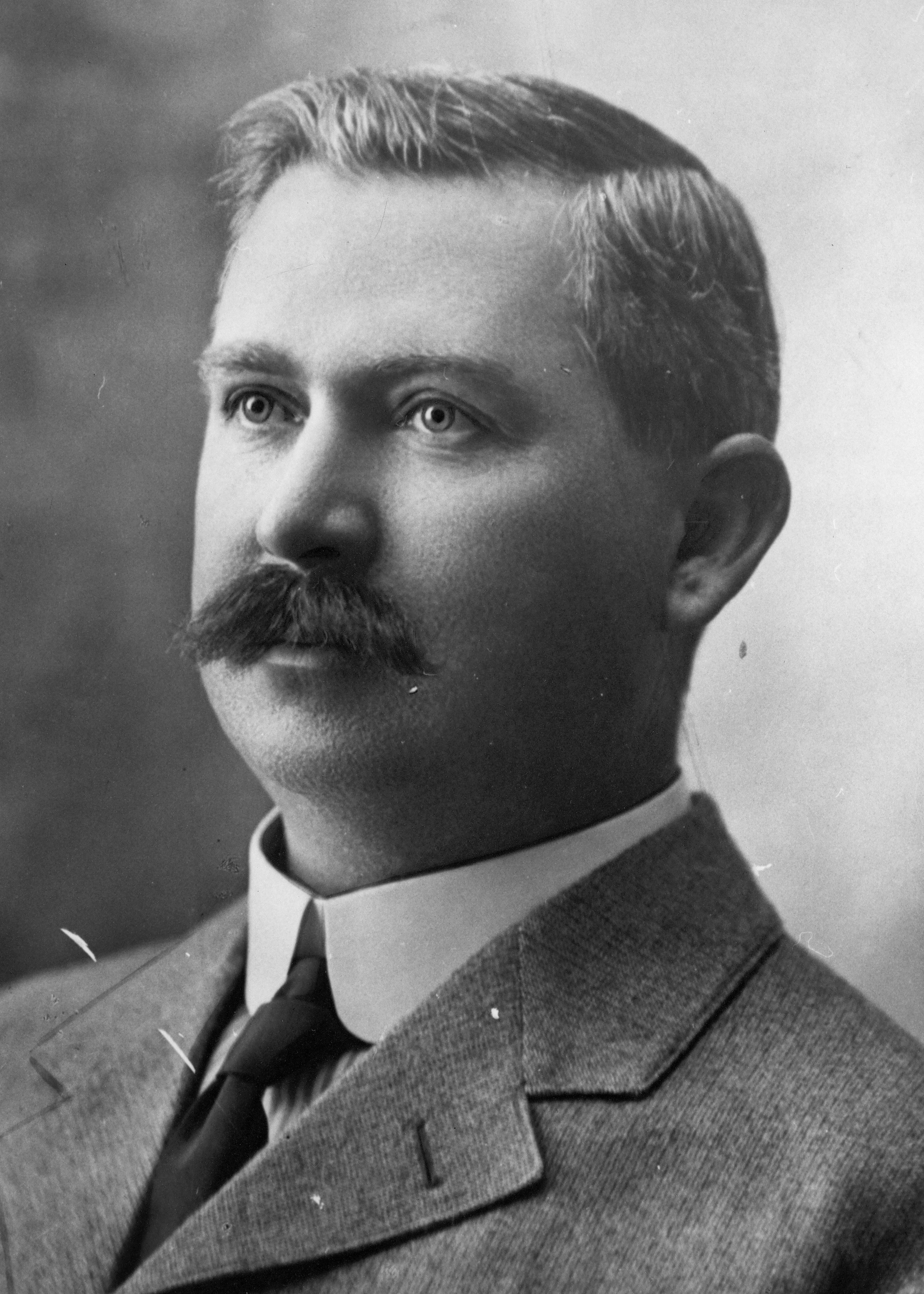
T. J. Ryan, the division's namesake

The division was created in 1949 and is named after T. J. Ryan, Premier of Queensland from 1915 to 1919.

In the 2001 federal election, Liberal candidate Michael Johnson was elected. He served as the member for Ryan until he was expelled from the Liberal Party. Johnson subsequently ran as an Independent in the 2010 federal election but lost.

Since 2016 there has been a growing Greens vote, gaining 20% of the first-preference vote in the 2019 election. In 2022, Greens candidate Elizabeth Watson-Brown won the seat from LNP member Julian Simmonds.

== Location ==
Since 1984, federal electoral division boundaries in Australia have been determined at redistributions by a redistribution committee appointed by the Australian Electoral Commission. Redistributions occur for the boundaries of divisions in a particular state, and they occur every seven years, or sooner if a state's representation entitlement changes or when divisions of a state are malapportioned.

Ryan is located in south-east Queensland, and is generally based on the western suburbs of the City of Brisbane.

The Division of Ryan encompasses a number of whole and part suburbs and localities:

- Anstead
- Ashgrove (western and north-western part)
- Auchenflower
- Banks Creek (within the City of Brisbane)
- Bardon (southern part)
- Bellbowrie
- Brookfield
- Chapel Hill
- England Creek (within the City of Brisbane)
- Enoggera (western part)
- Enoggera Reservoir
- Ferny Grove
- Fig Tree Pocket
- Gaythorne
- Indooroopilly
- Kenmore
- Kenmore Hills
- Keperra
- Lake Manchester (within the City of Brisbane)
- Mitchelton
- Moggill
- Mount Coot-tha
- Paddington (southern part)
- Pinjarra Hills
- Pullenvale
- St Lucia
- Taringa
- The Gap
- Toowong
- Upper Brookfield
- Upper Kedron

== Members ==
Image	Member	Party	Term	Notes
	Nigel Drury (1911–1984)	Liberal	10 December 1949 – 11 November 1975	Retired
	John Moore (1936–2025)	Liberal	13 December 1975 – 5 February 2001	Served as minister under Fraser and Howard. Resigned to retire from politics
	Leonie Short (1956–)	Labor	17 March 2001 – 10 November 2001	Lost seat
	Michael Johnson (1970–)	Liberal	10 November 2001 – 20 May 2010	Expelled from party and then lost seat
	Michael Johnson (1970–)	Independent	20 May 2010 – 21 August 2010	Expelled from party and then lost seat
	Jane Prentice (1953–)	Liberal (Note: Member of the Liberal National Party of Queensland sitting with the federal parliamentary Liberal Party.)	21 August 2010 – 11 April 2019	Lost preselection and retired
	Julian Simmonds (1985–)	Liberal	18 May 2019 – 21 May 2022	Lost seat
	Elizabeth Watson-Brown (1956–)	Greens	21 May 2022 – present	Incumbent

== Election results ==
2025 Australian federal election: Ryan
Party	Candidate	Votes	%	±%
Liberal National	Maggie Forrest	35,806	34.61	−3.89
Greens	Elizabeth Watson-Brown	29,986	28.98	−1.23
Labor	Rebecca Hack	29,217	28.24	+5.94
People First	Nicole de Lapp	2,407	2.33	+2.33
One Nation	Robbie Elsom	2,327	2.25	+0.00
Trumpet of Patriots	Ryan Hunt	1,372	1.33	+0.97
Family First	Donna Gallehawk	1,340	1.30	+1.30
Fusion	Gina Masterton	1,007	0.97	+0.97
Total formal votes		103,462	97.06	+0.12
Informal votes		3,136	2.94	−0.12
Turnout		106,598	92.81	+0.77
Notional two-party-preferred count
Labor	Rebecca Hack	59,822	57.82	+5.40
Liberal National	Maggie Forrest	43,640	42.18	−5.40
Two-candidate-preferred result
Greens	Elizabeth Watson-Brown	55,112	53.27	+0.62
Liberal National	Maggie Forrest	48,350	46.73	−0.62
Greens hold		Swing	+0.62	
