= Electoral results for the Division of Grey =

Australian division election results

This is a list of electoral results for the Division of Grey (O'Donoghue) in Australian federal elections from the division's creation in 1903 until the present.

== Members ==
Member	Party	Term
Alexander Poynton	Labor	1903–1916
Alexander Poynton	National Labor	1916–1917
Alexander Poynton	Nationalist	1917–1922
Andrew Lacey	Labor	1922–1931
Philip McBride	United Australia	1931–1937
Oliver Badman	Country	1937–1940
Oliver Badman	United Australia	1940–1943
Edgar Russell	Labor	1943–1963
Jack Mortimer	Labor	1963–1966
Don Jessop	Liberal	1966–1969
Laurie Wallis	Labor	1969–1983
Lloyd O'Neil	Labor	1983–1993
Barry Wakelin	Liberal	1993–2007
Rowan Ramsey	Liberal	2007–2025
Tom Venning	Liberal	2025–present

== Election results ==
=== Elections in the 2020s ===
==== 2025 ====
2025 Australian federal election: Grey
Party	Candidate	Votes	%	±%
Liberal	Tom Venning	37,287	34.89	−10.43
Labor	Karin Bolton	24,053	22.50	+1.10
Independent	Anita Kuss	18,745	17.54	+17.54
One Nation	Brandon Turton	10,652	9.97	+3.71
Greens	Kathryn Hardwick-Franco	6,323	5.92	−0.86
Family First	Kylie Evans	3,856	3.61	+3.61
National	Peter Borda	3,288	3.08	+3.08
Trumpet of Patriots	Laury Hendrik Bais	2,677	2.50	+1.80
Total formal votes		106,881	92.88	−0.19
Informal votes		8,194	7.12	+0.19
Turnout		115,075	89.41	−0.21
Two-party-preferred result
Liberal	Tom Venning	58,402	54.64	−5.43
Labor	Karin Bolton	48,479	45.36	+5.43
Liberal hold		Swing	−5.43	

==== 2022 ====
2022 Australian federal election: Grey
Party	Candidate	Votes	%	±%
Liberal	Rowan Ramsey	46,730	45.32	−5.33
Labor	Julie Watson	22,068	21.40	−1.43
Independent	Liz Habermann	11,613	11.26	+11.26
Greens	Tim White	6,994	6.78	+2.18
One Nation	Kerry Ann White	6,452	6.26	−2.43
United Australia	Suzanne Waters	5,781	5.61	+1.85
Liberal Democrats	Peter Miller	1,427	1.38	+1.38
Independent	Richard Carmody	1,332	1.29	−0.45
Federation	Tracey Dempsey	721	0.70	+0.70
Total formal votes		103,118	93.07	−0.02
Informal votes		7,674	6.93	+0.02
Turnout		110,792	89.62	−3.03
Two-party-preferred result
Liberal	Rowan Ramsey	61,938	60.07	−3.25
Labor	Julie Watson	41,180	39.93	+3.25
Liberal hold		Swing	−3.25	

Alluvial diagram for preference flows in the seat of Grey in the 2022 federal election. indicates at what stage the winning candidate had over 50% of the votes and was declared the winner.

=== Elections in the 2010s ===
==== 2019 ====
2019 Australian federal election: Grey
Party	Candidate	Votes	%	±%
Liberal	Rowan Ramsey	52,392	50.65	+8.49
Labor	Karin Bolton	23,612	22.83	+0.26
One Nation	David Stone	8,990	8.69	+8.69
Centre Alliance	Andrea Broadfoot	5,324	5.15	−21.55
Greens	Candace Champion	4,760	4.60	+1.91
United Australia	Alexander Warren	3,891	3.76	+3.76
Animal Justice	Jacqui Edgecombe	2,681	2.59	+2.59
Independent	Richard Carmody	1,797	1.74	+1.74
Total formal votes		103,447	93.09	−2.90
Informal votes		7,684	6.91	+2.90
Turnout		111,131	92.65	0.00
Two-party-preferred result
Liberal	Rowan Ramsey	65,504	63.32	+11.37
Labor	Karin Bolton	37,943	36.68	+36.68
Liberal hold		Swing	+11.37	

==== 2016 ====
2016 Australian federal election: Grey
Party	Candidate	Votes	%	±%
Liberal	Rowan Ramsey	38,409	42.74	−12.91
Xenophon	Andrea Broadfoot	24,936	27.74	+27.74
Labor	Scott Martin	19,373	21.56	−5.74
Family First	Cheryl Kaminski	3,710	4.13	−1.37
Greens	Jillian Marsh	2,304	2.56	−1.15
Independent	Phillip Gourlay	1,144	1.27	+1.27
Total formal votes		89,876	96.13	+1.53
Informal votes		3,619	3.87	−1.53
Turnout		93,495	91.61	−1.40
Notional two-party-preferred count
Liberal	Rowan Ramsey	52,696	58.63	−4.91
Labor	Scott Martin	37,180	41.37	+4.91
Two-candidate-preferred result
Liberal	Rowan Ramsey	46,692	51.95	−11.59
Xenophon	Andrea Broadfoot	43,184	48.05	+48.05
Liberal hold		Swing	N/A	

==== 2013 ====
2013 Australian federal election: Grey
Party	Candidate	Votes	%	±%
Liberal	Rowan Ramsey	49,334	55.65	−0.16
Labor	Ben Browne	24,205	27.30	−3.76
Family First	Cheryl Kaminski	4,878	5.50	+0.14
Palmer United	Kristian Rees	4,457	5.03	+5.03
Greens	Alison Sentance	3,289	3.71	−4.06
Independent	Greg Fidge	2,488	2.81	+2.81
Total formal votes		88,651	94.60	−0.05
Informal votes		5,063	5.40	+0.05
Turnout		93,714	93.02	−0.53
Two-party-preferred result
Liberal	Rowan Ramsey	56,330	63.54	+2.38
Labor	Ben Browne	32,321	36.46	−2.38
Liberal hold		Swing	+2.38	

==== 2010 ====
2010 Australian federal election: Grey
Party	Candidate	Votes	%	±%
Liberal	Rowan Ramsey	49,361	55.78	+8.52
Labor	Tauto Sansbury	27,514	31.09	−7.57
Greens	Andrew Melville-Smith	6,876	7.77	+3.65
Family First	Sylvia Holland	4,741	5.36	+0.86
Total formal votes		88,492	94.65	−1.10
Informal votes		4,997	5.35	+1.10
Turnout		93,489	93.66	−1.29
Two-party-preferred result
Liberal	Rowan Ramsey	54,119	61.16	+6.73
Labor	Tauto Sansbury	34,373	38.84	−6.73
Liberal hold		Swing	+6.73	

=== Elections in the 2000s ===
==== 2007 ====
2007 Australian federal election: Grey
Party	Candidate	Votes	%	±%
Liberal	Rowan Ramsey	42,132	47.26	−9.24
Labor	Karin Bolton	34,466	38.66	+8.35
Family First	Mal Holland	4,009	4.50	−0.55
Greens	Rosalie Garland	3,669	4.12	+0.82
National	Wilbur Klein	2,725	3.06	+3.06
Democrats	Gil Robertson	1,094	1.23	−1.11
Independent	David Wright	1,050	1.18	+1.18
Total formal votes		89,145	95.75	+0.80
Informal votes		3,961	4.25	−0.80
Turnout		93,106	94.93	+0.74
Two-party-preferred result
Liberal	Rowan Ramsey	48,522	54.43	−9.39
Labor	Karin Bolton	40,623	45.57	+9.39
Liberal hold		Swing	−9.39	

==== 2004 ====
2004 Australian federal election: Grey
Party	Candidate	Votes	%	±%
Liberal	Barry Wakelin	49,155	56.49	+2.01
Labor	John Hackett	26,375	30.31	−0.86
Family First	Roger Kleinig	4,397	5.05	+5.05
Greens	Felicity Martin	2,872	3.30	+0.87
Democrats	Gil Robertson	2,036	2.34	−2.46
One Nation	Peter Fitzpatrick	1,903	2.19	−4.93
Citizens Electoral Council	Paul Siebert	270	0.31	+0.31
Total formal votes		87,008	94.95	−0.28
Informal votes		4,631	5.05	+0.28
Turnout		91,639	94.19	−0.99
Two-party-preferred result
Liberal	Barry Wakelin	55,528	63.82	+3.17
Labor	John Hackett	31,480	36.18	−3.17
Liberal hold		Swing	+3.17	

==== 2001 ====
2001 Australian federal election: Grey
Party	Candidate	Votes	%	±%
Liberal	Barry Wakelin	42,270	54.61	+6.91
Labor	Con O'Neill	24,345	31.45	+0.83
One Nation	Sylvia Holland	5,276	6.82	−6.19
Democrats	Gil Robertson	3,672	4.74	−0.41
Greens	Felicity Martin	1,845	2.38	+2.38
Total formal votes		77,408	95.43	−0.31
Informal votes		3,708	4.57	+0.31
Turnout		81,116	94.95	
Two-party-preferred result
Liberal	Barry Wakelin	46,876	60.56	+1.53
Labor	Con O'Neill	30,532	39.44	−1.53
Liberal hold		Swing	+1.53	

=== Elections in the 1990s ===
==== 1998 ====
1998 Australian federal election: Grey
Party	Candidate	Votes	%	±%
Liberal	Barry Wakelin	35,669	47.45	−6.84
Labor	Geoff Buckland	23,581	31.37	−5.06
One Nation	Noel Dickson	9,469	12.60	+12.60
Democrats	Nick Weetman	3,802	5.06	−1.85
National	Ian Gray	1,592	2.12	+2.12
Independent	Martin Jackson	729	0.97	+0.97
Natural Law	Paul Brown	325	0.43	+0.43
Total formal votes		75,167	95.79	−0.75
Informal votes		3,306	4.21	+0.75
Turnout		78,473	94.64	−0.39
Two-party-preferred result
Liberal	Barry Wakelin	43,627	58.04	−0.50
Labor	Geoff Buckland	31,540	41.96	+0.50
Liberal hold		Swing	−0.50	

==== 1996 ====
1996 Australian federal election: Grey
Party	Candidate	Votes	%	±%
Liberal	Barry Wakelin	41,625	54.29	+10.02
Labor	Denis Crisp	27,929	36.43	−1.80
Democrats	Martin Jackson	5,298	6.91	+3.95
Greens	Julia Tymukas	1,813	2.36	+2.36
Total formal votes		76,665	96.54	+0.66
Informal votes		2,749	3.46	−0.66
Turnout		79,414	95.02	+0.40
Two-party-preferred result
Liberal	Barry Wakelin	44,681	58.54	+6.46
Labor	Denis Crisp	31,649	41.46	−6.46
Liberal hold		Swing	+6.46	

==== 1993 ====
1993 Australian federal election: Grey
Party	Candidate	Votes	%	±%
Liberal	Barry Wakelin	34,703	44.28	+4.25
Labor	Barry Piltz	29,963	38.23	−5.34
Independent	George Crowe	6,248	7.97	+7.97
National	Rod Nettle	2,878	3.67	+3.67
Democrats	Matthew Rogers	2,318	2.96	−4.86
Call to Australia	Anne Wilson	813	1.04	−5.85
Natural Law	Colin Vincent	445	0.57	+0.57
Independent	Jeff Munchenberg	354	0.45	+0.45
Independent	John Fisher	307	0.39	−0.14
Independent	Peter Solomon	220	0.28	+0.28
Confederate Action	Roger Oates	124	0.16	+0.16
Total formal votes		78,373	95.88	−0.96
Informal votes		3,365	4.12	+0.96
Turnout		81,738	94.62	
Two-party-preferred result
Liberal	Barry Wakelin	40,729	52.08	+4.11
Labor	Barry Piltz	37,483	47.92	−4.11
Liberal gain from Labor		Swing	+4.11	

==== 1990 ====
1990 Australian federal election: Grey
Party	Candidate	Votes	%	±%
Labor	Lloyd O'Neil	30,600	47.7	−4.2
Liberal	Jonathan Man	22,601	35.2	−0.1
Call to Australia	Ern Heyne	5,006	7.8	+7.8
Democrats	Harm Folkers	4,608	7.2	+1.9
Independent	Peter Clark	904	1.4	+1.4
Independent	John Fisher	414	0.6	+0.6
Total formal votes		64,133	96.7	
Informal votes		2,176	3.3	
Turnout		66,309	95.1	
Two-party-preferred result
Labor	Lloyd O'Neil	36,169	56.5	+0.7
Liberal	Jonathan Man	27,852	43.5	−0.7
Labor hold		Swing	+0.7	

=== Elections in the 1980s ===
==== 1987 ====
1987 Australian federal election: Grey
Party	Candidate	Votes	%	±%
Labor	Lloyd O'Neil	32,005	51.9	−0.6
Liberal	Russell Reid	21,759	35.3	−2.3
National	Robin Dixon-Thompson	4,189	6.8	+2.9
Democrats	Chris James	3,286	5.3	−0.7
Unite Australia	Leonce Kealy	480	0.8	+0.8
Total formal votes		61,719	93.9	
Informal votes		3,996	6.1	
Turnout		65,715	93.0	
Two-party-preferred result
Labor	Lloyd O'Neil	34,425	55.8	−1.3
Liberal	Russell Reid	27,271	44.2	+1.3
Labor hold		Swing	−1.3	

==== 1984 ====
1984 Australian federal election: Grey
Party	Candidate	Votes	%	±%
Labor	Lloyd O'Neil	31,518	52.5	+0.3
Liberal	Russell Reid	22,584	37.6	+4.8
Democrats	Harm Folkers	3,626	6.0	+0.2
National	Robin Dixon-Thompson	2,354	3.9	−1.1
Total formal votes		60,082	90.6	
Informal votes		6,248	9.4	
Turnout		66,330	94.7	
Two-party-preferred result
Labor	Lloyd O'Neil	34,278	57.1	−0.2
Liberal	Russell Reid	25,799	42.9	+0.2
Labor hold		Swing	−0.2	

==== 1983 ====
1983 Australian federal election: Grey
Party	Candidate	Votes	%	±%
Labor	Lloyd O'Neil	35,276	51.0	+0.9
Liberal	Joy Baluch	24,114	34.9	−5.5
Democrats	Jack Babbage	3,981	5.8	+1.2
National	Anthony Haskett	3,454	5.0	+0.1
Independent	James Cronin	1,556	2.3	+2.3
Libertarian	Kerry Hawkes	732	1.1	+1.1
Total formal votes		69,113	96.9	
Informal votes		2,207	3.1	
Turnout		71,320	95.2	
Two-party-preferred result
Labor	Lloyd O'Neil		56.1	+2.7
Liberal	Joy Baluch		43.9	−2.7
Labor hold		Swing	+2.7	

==== 1980 ====
1980 Australian federal election: Grey
Party	Candidate	Votes	%	±%
Labor	Laurie Wallis	33,871	50.1	+3.4
Liberal	Brian Fitzgerald	27,263	40.4	+1.2
National Country	Anthony Haskett	3,342	4.9	−4.2
Democrats	Mary Good	3,084	4.6	−0.4
Total formal votes		67,560	97.4	
Informal votes		1,801	2.6	
Turnout		69,361	95.0	
Two-party-preferred result
Labor	Laurie Wallis		53.4	+3.4
Liberal	Brian Fitzgerald		46.6	−3.4
Labor hold		Swing	+3.4	

=== Elections in the 1970s ===
==== 1977 ====
1977 Australian federal election: Grey
Party	Candidate	Votes	%	±%
Labor	Laurie Wallis	31,221	46.7	+0.7
Liberal	John Oswald	26,166	39.2	−10.6
National Country	John Henderson	6,065	9.1	+9.1
Democrats	Ronald Moulds	3,331	5.0	+5.0
Total formal votes		66,783	96.9	
Informal votes		2,152	3.1	
Turnout		68,935	94.8	
Two-party-preferred result
Labor	Laurie Wallis	33,424	50.0	+2.9
Liberal	John Oswald	33,359	50.0	−2.9
Labor notional gain from Liberal		Swing	+2.9	

==== 1975 ====
1975 Australian federal election: Grey
Party	Candidate	Votes	%	±%
Labor	Laurie Wallis	28,182	49.4	−3.3
Liberal	Dennis Burman	26,438	46.4	+14.2
Liberal Movement	Arnold Eckersley	2,371	4.2	+2.6
Total formal votes		56,991	97.9	
Informal votes		1,220	2.1	
Turnout		58,211	95.3	
Two-party-preferred result
Labor	Laurie Wallis	28,777	50.5	−5.0
Liberal	Dennis Burman	28,214	49.5	+5.0
Labor hold		Swing	−5.0	

==== 1974 ====
1974 Australian federal election: Grey
Party	Candidate	Votes	%	±%
Labor	Laurie Wallis	28,373	52.7	−1.3
Liberal	Dennis Burman	17,337	32.2	−2.6
Country	George Heading	6,112	11.4	+11.4
Australia	Bill McMahon	1,124	2.1	+2.1
Liberal Movement	Nigel Clarke	882	1.6	+1.6
Total formal votes		53,828	97.6	
Informal votes		1,344	2.4	
Turnout		55,172	96.1	
Two-party-preferred result
Labor	Laurie Wallis		55.5	−2.9
Liberal	Dennis Burman		44.5	+2.9
Labor hold		Swing	−2.9	

==== 1972 ====
1972 Australian federal election: Grey
Party	Candidate	Votes	%	±%
Labor	Laurie Wallis	25,941	54.0	+4.2
Liberal	Pat Rehn	16,698	34.8	−8.6
Australia	Derek Ball	3,368	7.0	+4.0
Democratic Labor	David Gray	2,015	4.2	+0.3
Total formal votes		48,022	97.6	
Informal votes		1,170	2.4	
Turnout		49,192	95.4	
Two-party-preferred result
Labor	Laurie Wallis		58.4	+6.5
Liberal	Pat Rehn		41.6	−6.5
Labor hold		Swing	+6.5	

=== Elections in the 1960s ===
==== 1969 ====
1969 Australian federal election: Grey
Party	Candidate	Votes	%	±%
Labor	Laurie Wallis	22,096	49.8	+2.3
Liberal	Don Jessop	19,257	43.4	−3.0
Democratic Labor	Douglas Barnes	1,723	3.9	−2.1
Australia	Thomas Manthorpe	1,314	3.0	+3.0
Total formal votes		44,390	97.0	
Informal votes		1,380	3.0	
Turnout		45,770	95.2	
Two-party-preferred result
Labor	Laurie Wallis		51.9	+3.1
Liberal	Don Jessop		48.1	−3.1
Labor gain from Liberal		Swing	+3.1	

==== 1966 ====
1966 Australian federal election: Grey
Party	Candidate	Votes	%	±%
Liberal	Don Jessop	22,562	48.2	+6.3
Labor	Jack Mortimer	21,391	45.7	−8.5
Democratic Labor	Douglas Barnes	2,811	6.0	+2.2
Total formal votes		46,764	98.2	
Informal votes		864	1.8	
Turnout		47,628	96.0	
Two-party-preferred result
Liberal	Don Jessop	24,797	53.0	+7.8
Labor	Jack Mortimer	21,967	47.0	−7.8
Liberal gain from Labor		Swing	+7.8	

==== 1963 ====
1963 Australian federal election: Grey
Party	Candidate	Votes	%	±%
Labor	Jack Mortimer	24,236	54.2	−4.0
Liberal	Vern Dyason	18,749	41.9	+3.7
Democratic Labor	William Ahern	1,718	3.8	+0.2
Total formal votes		44,703	98.9	
Informal votes		492	1.1	
Turnout		45,195	96.7	
Two-party-preferred result
Labor	Jack Mortimer		54.8	−4.0
Liberal	Vern Dyason		45.2	+4.0
Labor hold		Swing	−4.0	

==== 1963 by-election ====
Grey by-election, 1963
Party	Candidate	Votes	%	±%
Labor	Jack Mortimer	21,463	51.3	−6.9
Liberal	Vern Dyason	17,494	41.8	+3.6
Independent	Leonard Kent	1,265	3.0	+3.0
Democratic Labor	Richard Mills	935	2.2	−1.4
Independent Labor	Desmond Clark	705	1.7	+1.7
Total formal votes		41,862	98.3	
Informal votes		718	1.7	
Turnout		42,580	91.8	
Two-party-preferred result
Labor	Jack Mortimer		53.5	−5.3
Liberal	Vern Dyason		46.5	+5.3
Labor hold		Swing	−5.3	

==== 1961 ====
1961 Australian federal election: Grey
Party	Candidate	Votes	%	±%
Labor	Edgar Russell	24,642	58.2	+4.7
Liberal	Arthur Dodgson	16,155	38.2	−2.6
Democratic Labor	Richard Mills	1,512	3.6	−0.8
Total formal votes		42,309	97.4	
Informal votes		1,127	2.6	
Turnout		43,436	96.0	
Two-party-preferred result
Labor	Edgar Russell		58.8	+3.8
Liberal	Arthur Dodgson		41.2	−3.8
Labor hold		Swing	+3.8	

=== Elections in the 1950s ===
==== 1958 ====
1958 Australian federal election: Grey
Party	Candidate	Votes	%	±%
Labor	Edgar Russell	21,323	53.5	−3.2
Liberal	David Gunn	16,233	40.8	−2.5
Democratic Labor	Richard Mills	1,755	4.4	+4.4
Independent	Frank Rieck	513	1.3	+1.3
Total formal votes		39,824	97.2	
Informal votes		1,156	2.8	
Turnout		40,980	96.1	
Two-party-preferred result
Labor	Edgar Russell		55.0	−1.7
Liberal	David Gunn		45.0	+1.7
Labor hold		Swing	−1.7	

==== 1955 ====
1955 Australian federal election: Grey
Party	Candidate	Votes	%	±%
Labor	Edgar Russell	21,836	56.7	−1.6
Liberal	George Bockelberg	16,646	43.3	+1.6
Total formal votes		38,482	97.6	
Informal votes		959	2.4	
Turnout		39,441	95.7	
Labor hold		Swing	−1.6	

==== 1954 ====
1954 Australian federal election: Grey
Party	Candidate	Votes	%	±%
Labor	Edgar Russell	22,749	58.3	+2.2
Liberal	Thomas Cheesman	16,253	41.7	−2.2
Total formal votes		39,002	98.4	
Informal votes		622	1.6	
Turnout		39,624	96.2	
Labor hold		Swing	+2.2	

==== 1951 ====
1951 Australian federal election: Grey
Party	Candidate	Votes	%	±%
Labor	Edgar Russell	21,384	56.1	+1.7
Liberal	Edward Andrews	16,749	43.9	−1.7
Total formal votes		38,133	98.4	
Informal votes		616	1.6	
Turnout		38,749	96.3	
Labor hold		Swing	+1.7	

=== Elections in the 1940s ===
==== 1949 ====
1949 Australian federal election: Grey
Party	Candidate	Votes	%	±%
Labor	Edgar Russell	20,465	54.4	−6.1
Liberal	Edward Andrews	17,145	45.6	+6.1
Total formal votes		37,610	98.3	
Informal votes		656	1.7	
Turnout		38,266	95.5	
Labor hold		Swing	−6.1	

==== 1946 ====
1946 Australian federal election: Grey
Party	Candidate	Votes	%	±%
Labor	Edgar Russell	27,479	55.5	+3.0
Liberal	Oliver Badman	22,016	44.5	−3.0
Total formal votes		49,495	97.8	
Informal votes		1,128	2.2	
Turnout		50,623	95.2	
Labor hold		Swing	+3.0	

==== 1943 ====
1943 Australian federal election: Grey
Party	Candidate	Votes	%	±%
Labor	Edgar Russell	25,735	52.5	+15.1
United Australia	Oliver Badman	23,285	47.5	+47.5
Total formal votes		49,020	97.5	
Informal votes		1,241	2.5	
Turnout		50,261	96.5	
Labor gain from Country		Swing	+10.2	

==== 1940 ====
1940 Australian federal election: Grey
Party	Candidate	Votes	%	±%
Country	Oliver Badman	25,683	52.8	+0.8
Labor	Charles Davis	18,178	37.4	−0.4
Independent	Percy McFarlane	4,790	9.8	+9.8
Total formal votes		48,651	96.9	
Informal votes		1,580	3.1	
Turnout		50,231	96.6	
Two-party-preferred result
Country	Oliver Badman		57.7	+0.6
Labor	Charles Davis		42.3	−0.6
Country hold		Swing	+0.6	

=== Elections in the 1930s ===
==== 1937 ====
1937 Australian federal election: Grey
Party	Candidate	Votes	%	±%
Country	Oliver Badman	24,153	52.0	+52.0
Labor	James Marner	17,528	37.8	+3.6
Independent	Alfred Parker	4,736	10.2	+10.2
Total formal votes		46,417	95.8	
Informal votes		2,029	4.2	
Turnout		48,446	97.2	
Two-party-preferred result
Country	Oliver Badman		57.1	+57.1
Labor	James Marner		42.9	+2.9
Country gain from United Australia		Swing	−2.9	

==== 1934 ====
1934 Australian federal election: Grey
Party	Candidate	Votes	%	±%
United Australia	Philip McBride	24,930	55.2	+1.5
Labor	Michael Murphy	15,424	34.2	+9.0
Independent	Alfred Barns	4,781	10.6	+6.8
Total formal votes		45,135	95.2	
Informal votes		2,297	4.8	
Turnout		47,432	96.0	
Two-party-preferred result
United Australia	Philip McBride		60.0	−0.6
Labor	Michael Murphy		40.0	+0.6
United Australia hold		Swing	−0.6	

==== 1931 ====
1931 Australian federal election: Grey
Party	Candidate	Votes	%	±%
Emergency Committee	Philip McBride	16,372	48.1	+48.1
Labor	Andrew Lacey	12,691	37.3	−22.3
Single Tax League	James Hodgson	3,674	10.8	+10.8
Independent	Alfred Barns	1,292	3.8	+3.8
Total formal votes		34,029	95.0	
Informal votes		1,805	5.0	
Turnout		35,834	93.9	
Two-party-preferred result
Emergency Committee	Philip McBride	19,560	57.5	+57.5
Labor	Andrew Lacey	14,469	42.5	−17.1
Emergency Committee gain from Labor		Swing	+17.1	

=== Elections in the 1920s ===
==== 1929 ====
1929 Australian federal election: Grey
Party	Candidate	Votes	%	±%
Labor	Andrew Lacey	19,870	59.6	+3.8
Country	Oliver Badman	13,445	40.4	+40.4
Total formal votes		33,315	95.7	
Informal votes		1,485	4.3	
Turnout		34,800	92.7	
Labor hold		Swing	+3.8	

==== 1928 ====
1928 Australian federal election: Grey
Party	Candidate	Votes	%	±%
Labor	Andrew Lacey	17,904	55.8	+3.2
Nationalist	William Blight	14,174	44.2	−3.2
Total formal votes		32,078	91.9	
Informal votes		2,839	8.1	
Turnout		34,917	92.0	
Labor hold		Swing	+3.2	

==== 1925 ====
1925 Australian federal election: Grey
Party	Candidate	Votes	%	±%
Labor	Andrew Lacey	16,427	52.6	−1.1
Nationalist	John Lyons	14,780	47.4	+1.1
Total formal votes		31,207	95.9	
Informal votes		1,318	4.1	
Turnout		32,525	91.8	
Labor hold		Swing	−1.1	

==== 1922 ====
1922 Australian federal election: Grey
Party	Candidate	Votes	%	±%
Labor	Andrew Lacey	9,778	53.7	+5.5
Nationalist	Alexander Poynton	8,425	46.3	−5.5
Total formal votes		18,203	92.9	
Informal votes		1,385	7.1	
Turnout		19,588	57.3	
Labor gain from Nationalist		Swing	+5.5	

=== Elections in the 1910s ===
==== 1919 ====
1919 Australian federal election: Grey
Party	Candidate	Votes	%	±%
Nationalist	Alexander Poynton	11,642	51.8	−5.9
Labor	Charles Gray	10,843	48.2	+5.9
Total formal votes		22,485	97.3	
Informal votes		616	2.7	
Turnout		23,101	68.3	
Nationalist hold		Swing	−5.9	

==== 1917 ====
1917 Australian federal election: Grey
Party	Candidate	Votes	%	±%
Nationalist	Alexander Poynton	13,495	57.7	+11.7
Labor	Thomas Lyons	9,909	42.3	−11.7
Total formal votes		23,404	96.5	
Informal votes		840	3.5	
Turnout		24,244	70.1	
Nationalist gain from Labor		Swing	+11.7	

==== 1914 ====
1914 Australian federal election: Grey
Party	Candidate	Votes	%	±%
Labor	Alexander Poynton	14,218	54.0	+2.0
Liberal	William Morrow	12,116	46.0	−2.0
Total formal votes		26,334	97.9	
Informal votes		565	2.1	
Turnout		26,899	80.3	
Labor hold		Swing	+2.0	

==== 1913 ====
1913 Australian federal election: Grey
Party	Candidate	Votes	%	±%
Labor	Alexander Poynton	12,622	52.0	−48.0
Liberal	Arthur McDonald	11,642	48.0	+48.0
Total formal votes		24,264	95.6	
Informal votes		1,108	4.4	
Turnout		25,372	78.9	
Labor hold		Swing	−48.0	

==== 1910 ====
1910 Australian federal election: Grey
Party	Candidate	Votes	%	±%
Labour	Alexander Poynton	unopposed		
Labour hold		Swing		

=== Elections in the 1900s ===
==== 1906 ====
1906 Australian federal election: Grey
Party	Candidate	Votes	%	±%
Labour	Alexander Poynton	unopposed		
Labour hold		Swing		

==== 1903 ====
1903 Australian federal election: Grey
Party	Candidate	Votes	%	±%
Labour	Alexander Poynton	unopposed		
Labour win		(new seat)		
