= Candidates of the 1963 Australian federal election =

This article provides information on candidates who stood for the 1963 Australian federal election. The election was held on 30 November 1963.

== By-elections, appointments and defections ==
=== By-elections and appointments ===
- On 1 September 1962, Sam Benson (Labor) was elected to replace Alan Bird (Labor) as the member for Batman.
- On 9 October 1962, George Whiteside (Labor) was appointed a Queensland Senator to replace Max Poulter (Labor).
- On 1 June 1963, Jack Mortimer (Labor) was elected to replace Edgar Russell (Labor) as the member for Grey.
- On 28 September 1963, Len Devine (Labor) was elected to replace Eddie Ward (Labor) as the member for East Sydney.

== Retiring Members ==
=== Labor ===
- Norman Makin MP (Bonython, SA)
- Victor Kearney MP (Cunningham, NSW)
- Albert Thompson MP (Port Adelaide, SA)

=== Country ===
- Charles Davidson MP (Dawson, Qld)
- David Drummond MP (New England, NSW)
- Hugh Leslie MP (Moore, WA)

== House of Representatives ==
Sitting members at the time of the election are shown in bold text. Successful candidates are highlighted in the relevant colour. Where there is possible confusion, an asterisk (*) is also used.

=== Australian Capital Territory ===
Electorate	Held by	Labor candidate	Liberal candidate
Australian Capital Territory	Labor	**Jim Fraser**	Elizabeth Calvert

=== New South Wales ===
Electorate	Held by	Labor candidate	Coalition candidate	DLP candidate	Other candidates
Banks	Labor	**Eric Costa**	Milovan Kovjanic (Lib)		Pat Clancy (CPA)
Barton	Labor	**Len Reynolds**	Jack Manning (Lib)	Norma Boyle	
Bennelong	Liberal	William Baird	**John Cramer** (Lib)	Allan Dwyer	Joseph Woodhouse (NGP)
Blaxland	Labor	**Eli Harrison**	Terence Morrish (Lib)	Kevin Davis	
Bradfield	Liberal	Lawrence McCulloch	**Harry Turner** (Lib)	Dominique Droulers	
Calare	Country	Leroy Serisier	**John England** (CP)	George Boland	
Cowper	Labor	**Frank McGuren**	Ian Robinson (CP)		
Cunningham	Labor	Rex Connor	Jack Hough (Lib)		Bill McDougall (CPA)
Dalley	Labor	**William O'Connor**		Peter Keogh	
Darling	Labor	**Joe Clark**	Frederick Harding (CP)		
East Sydney	Labor	**Len Devine**	William Foster (Lib)		Bill Brown (CPA)
Eden-Monaro	Labor	**Allan Fraser**	Dugald Munro (Lib)	John Donohue	
Evans	Labor	**James Monaghan**	Malcolm Mackay (Lib)	Jack Kane	Stanislaus Kelly (Ind); Harold O'Reilly (Ind)
Farrer	Liberal	Herb McPherson	**David Fairbairn** (Lib)	Lawrence Esler	
Grayndler	Labor	**Fred Daly**	Robert Leech (Lib)		Joyce Stevens (CPA)
Gwydir	Country	Kenneth Green	**Ian Allan** (CP)		
Hughes	Labor	**Les Johnson**	William Cover (Lib)	George Apap	John Mantova (Ind); John Phillips (NGP)
Hume	Labor	**Arthur Fuller**	Geoffrey Ashton (Lib); Ian Pettitt* (CP)	Charles Rowe	
Hunter	Labor	**Bert James**	John Wassell (Lib)	Aubrey Barr	Evan Phillips (CPA)
Kingsford-Smith	Labor	**Dan Curtin**	Sidney Pitkethly (Lib)		Jim Baird (CPA)
Lang	Labor	**Frank Stewart**	Russell Carter (Lib)		Frank Ball (Ind)
Lawson	Country	John Canobi	**Laurie Failes** (CP)	Mario Morandini	
Lowe	Liberal	John Holland	**William McMahon** (Lib)	Reginald Lawson	
Lyne	Country	John Allan	**Philip Lucock** (CP)		Joe Cordner (Ind)
Macarthur	Liberal	Don Nilon	**Jeff Bate** (Lib)	Albert Perish	Ronald Sarina (Ind)
Mackellar	Liberal	Mabel Elliott	**Bill Wentworth** (Lib)	Philip Cohen	Hugh Begg (CPA)
Macquarie	Labor	**Tony Luchetti**	John Heesh (Lib)		
Mitchell	Labor	**John Armitage**	Les Irwin (Lib)	Malcolm Towner	Albert Ackerman (NGP); John Ashe (Ind)
New England	Country	Donald White	Ian Sinclair (CP)		James Gordon (Ind); Andrew Monley (Ind)
Newcastle	Labor	**Charles Jones**	Eric Cupit (Lib)	Jack Collins	
North Sydney	Liberal	Maurice Isaacs	**William Jack** (Lib)	Michael Fitzpatrick	
Parkes	Labor	**Les Haylen**	Tom Hughes (Lib)	Vincent Couch	
Parramatta	Liberal	Maxwell McLaren	**Sir Garfield Barwick** (Lib)	Edward Beck	
Paterson	Liberal	Archibald Jones	**Allen Fairhall** (Lib)		
Phillip	Labor	**Syd Einfeld**	William Aston (Lib)	John Antill	
Reid	Labor	**Tom Uren**	Thomas Reeves (Lib)	Mick Carroll	
Richmond	Country	Matthew Walsh	**Doug Anthony** (CP)		Peter Bray (Ind)
Riverina	Country	Jack Ward	**Hugh Roberton** (CP)	Victor Groutsch	
Robertson	Liberal	Bob Brown	**Roger Dean** (Lib)	George Britton	
Shortland	Labor	**Charles Griffiths**	William Gilchrist (Lib)	Robert Burke	Barbara Curthoys (CPA)
St George	Labor	**Lionel Clay**	Len Bosman (Lib)	John Vandergriff	
Warringah	Liberal	John Lancaster	**John Cockle** (Lib)	John Plunkett	
Watson	Labor	**Jim Cope**	Louis Mamo (Lib)	Bernard Atkinson	Harry Hatfield (CPA)
Wentworth	Liberal	Nell Simpson	**Les Bury** (Lib)		Arthur Bergman (Ind)
Werriwa	Labor	**Gough Whitlam**	Kevin Byrne (Lib)	Harry Cole	
West Sydney	Labor	**Dan Minogue**		William Doherty	Charles Kilduff (NGP); Maurice Law (Ind)

=== Northern Territory ===
Electorate	Held by	Labor candidate
Northern Territory	Labor	**Jock Nelson**

=== Queensland ===
Electorate	Held by	Labor candidate	Coalition candidate	DLP candidate	Other candidates
Bowman	Labor	**Jack Comber**	Wylie Gibbs (Lib)	Harry Wright	
Brisbane	Labor	**Manfred Cross**	Leith Sinclair (Lib)	John O'Connell	Warren Bowden (CPA)
Capricornia	Labor	**George Gray**	Maurice South (Lib)	Alphonsus Schleger	
Darling Downs	Liberal	Cyril Mitchell	**Reginald Swartz** (Lib)	Kenneth Rawle	
Dawson	Country	Doug Everingham	George Shaw (CP)	Edwin Eshmann	
Fisher	Country	William Weir	**Charles Adermann** (CP)	Geoffrey Traill	
Griffith	Labor	**Wilfred Coutts**	Keith Grant (Lib)	Paul Tucker	
Herbert	Labor	**Ted Harding**	Roy Pope (Lib)	Kiernan Dorney	Frank Bishop (CPA)
Kennedy	Labor	**Bill Riordan**	Keith Siemon (CP)	John Judge	
Leichhardt	Labor	**Bill Fulton**	Robert Norman (CP)	Arthur Trembath	
Lilley	Labor	**Don Cameron**	Kevin Cairns (Lib)	Frank Andrews	
Maranoa	Country	Trevor Alexander	**Wilfred Brimblecombe** (CP)	Mervyn Eunson	
McPherson	Country	Gerry Jones	**Charles Barnes** (CP)	Michael O'Connor	
Moreton	Liberal	John O'Donnell	**James Killen** (Lib)	Eric Allingham	
Oxley	Labor	**Bill Hayden**	Arthur Chresby (Lib)	Terence Burns	
Petrie	Labor	**Reginald O'Brien**	Alan Hulme (Lib)	Brian Balaam	Francis O'Mara (Ind)
Ryan	Liberal	Raymond McCreath	**Nigel Drury** (Lib)	Brian O'Brien	Robert Hooker (SCP)
Wide Bay	Labor	**Brendan Hansen**	Albert White (CP)	Rogers Judge	Geoffrey Nichols (SCP)

=== South Australia ===
Electorate	Held by	Labor candidate	Liberal candidate	DLP candidate	Other candidates
Adelaide	Labor	**Joe Sexton**	Karl-Juergen Liebetrau	Patrick Coffey	
Angas	Liberal	Robert Nielsen	**Alick Downer**		Elliott Johnston (CPA)
Barker	Liberal	Norman Alcock	**Jim Forbes**		Harvey Burns (Ind)
Bonython	Labor	Martin Nicholls		Edward Timlin	Alan Miller (CPA)
Boothby	Liberal	Ronald Basten	**Sir John McLeay**	Ted Farrell	
Grey	Labor	**Jack Mortimer**	Vern Dyason	William Ahern	
Hindmarsh	Labor	**Clyde Cameron**		Richard Mills	
Kingston	Labor	**Pat Galvin**	Kay Brownbill	Brian Crowe	
Port Adelaide	Labor	Fred Birrell		George Basisovs	Jim Moss (CPA)
Sturt	Liberal	Norm Foster	**Keith Wilson**	Walter Doran	
Wakefield	Liberal	John Penrose	**Bert Kelly**		

=== Tasmania ===
Electorate	Held by	Labor candidate	Liberal candidate	DLP candidate	Other candidates
Bass	Labor	**Lance Barnard**	James Wardlaw	Frederick Kaye	
Braddon	Labor	**Ron Davies**	Paul Fenton	Frances Lane	
Denison	Liberal	Donald Finlay	**Athol Townley**	Brian Bresnehan	Max Bound (CPA); Bruce Brown (Ind)
Franklin	Liberal	John Parsons	**Bill Falkinder**	Andrew Defendini	
Wilmot	Labor	**Gil Duthie**	Donald Paterson	Alastair Davidson	

=== Victoria ===
Electorate	Held by	Labor candidate	Coalition candidate	DLP candidate	Other candidates
Balaclava	Liberal	Ephraim Briskman	**Ray Whittorn** (Lib)	John Ryan	Edith Jewell (Ind)
Ballaarat	Liberal	Allan Williams	**Dudley Erwin** (Lib)	Bob Joshua	
Batman	Labor	**Sam Benson**	Bruce Skeggs (Lib)	Jack Little	
Bendigo	Labor	**Noel Beaton**	Fred Grimwade (Lib)	Bill Drechsler	
Bruce	Liberal	Barry Jones	**Billy Snedden** (Lib)	Henri de Sachau	Brian Crossley (Ind); Tom Gilhoooley (Ind)
Chisholm	Liberal	John Button	**Sir Wilfrid Kent Hughes** (Lib)	John Duffy	
Corangamite	Liberal	Fred Black	**Dan Mackinnon** (Lib)	Francis O'Brien	
Corio	Liberal	Bob Hawke	**Hubert Opperman** (Lib)	James Mahoney	
Darebin	Labor	**Frank Courtnay**	Peter Coupe (Lib)	Tom Andrews	
Deakin	Liberal	Pat Hubbard	**Frank Davis** (Lib)	Maurice Weston	
Fawkner	Liberal	Gwendolyn Noad	**Peter Howson** (Lib)	John Speed	George Gabriel (Ind)
Flinders	Liberal	Nola Barber	**Robert Lindsay** (Lib)	Martin Curry	
Gellibrand	Labor	**Hector McIvor**	Harley Price (Lib)	Jan Roszkowski	David Davies (CPA)
Gippsland	Country	Sydney Evans	**Peter Nixon** (CP)	John Hansen	
Henty	Liberal	George Taylor	**Max Fox** (Lib)	Joseph McHugh	Herbert Viney (Ind Lab)
Higgins	Liberal	Roger Kirby	**Harold Holt** (Lib)	Celia Laird	
Higinbotham	Liberal	Reginald Butler	**Don Chipp** (Lib)	William Cameron	
Indi	Country	Mervyn Huggins	Ian Foyster (Lib); **Mac Holten*** (CP)	Christopher Cody	
Isaacs	Liberal	Paul Court	**William Haworth** (Lib)	John Hughes	
Kooyong	Liberal	Robert White	**Sir Robert Menzies** (Lib)	Charles Murphy	Ralph Gibson (CPA)
Lalor	Labor	**Reg Pollard**	Bernard Treseder (Lib)	Jim Marmion	
La Trobe	Liberal	Moss Cass	**John Jess** (Lib)	Kevin Adamson	
Mallee	Country	Maurice Hinton	**Winton Turnbull** (CP)	Michael Howley	
Maribyrnong	Liberal	Neil Armour	**Philip Stokes** (Lib)	Frank McManus	John Murray (ARP); Edwin Ryan (Ind)
McMillan	Liberal	Eric Kent	**Alex Buchanan** (Lib)	Les Hilton	
Melbourne	Labor	**Arthur Calwell**	Charles Hider (Lib)	Thomas Brennan	
Melbourne Ports	Labor	**Frank Crean**	James Pond (Lib)	George O'Dwyer	Roger Wilson (CPA)
Murray	Country	Neil Frankland	**John McEwen** (CP)	Brian Lacey	
Scullin	Labor	**Ted Peters**	John Harrison (Lib)	James Abikhair	Ron Hearn (CPA)
Wannon	Liberal	Cyril Primmer	**Malcolm Fraser** (Lib)	Terence Callander	
Wills	Labor	**Gordon Bryant**	James Muntz (Lib)	John Hardy	
Wimmera	Country	Thomas Windsor	**Robert King*** (CP); Howard Rodda (Lib)	Adrian Cahill	
Yarra	Labor	**Jim Cairns**	Anthony Hearder (Lib)	Stan Keon	

=== Western Australia ===
Electorate	Held by	Labor candidate	Coalition candidate	DLP candidate	Other candidates
Canning	Liberal	Charles Edwards	John Hallett* (CP); **Neil McNeill** (Lib)		Ronald Batey (Ind)
Curtin	Liberal		**Paul Hasluck** (Lib)	Francis Dwyer	John Gandini (CPA)
Forrest	Liberal	Robert Smithson	**Gordon Freeth** (Lib)		Frank Oates (Ind CP)
Fremantle	Labor	**Kim Beazley**	John Waghorne (Lib)		James Collins (Ind); Paddy Troy (CPA)
Kalgoorlie	Labor	**Fred Collard**	Peter Browne (Lib)	James Ardagh; Antonius Berkhout	
Moore	Country	Wilbur Bennett	Hugh Halbert (Lib); Don Maisey* (CP)		
Perth	Liberal	Edward Halse	**Fred Chaney** (Lib)	Arthur White	
Stirling	Labor	**Harry Webb**	Doug Cash (Lib)	Brian Peachey	
Swan	Liberal	Joe Berinson	**Richard Cleaver** (Lib)	Gerardus Sappelli	Warwick Hill (Ind)

== Senate ==
Sitting Senators are shown in bold text. Tickets that elected at least one Senator are highlighted in the relevant colour. Successful candidates are identified by an asterisk (*).

=== Queensland ===
A special election was held in Queensland to fill the vacancy caused by the death of Labor Senator Max Poulter. George Whiteside, also of the Labor Party, had been appointed to this vacancy in the interim period.

Labor candidates	DLP candidates	Ungrouped candidates
1. **George Whiteside**; 2. Bert Turner	1. Oliver Andersen; 2. Anne Wenck	Reginald Leigh (Ind); Kenneth Morris* (Lib); Bruce Tannock (Ind); James Drabsch (Ind)

== Summary by party ==
Beside each party is the number of seats contested by that party in the House of Representatives for each state, as well as an indication of whether the party contested the special Senate election in Queensland.

Party	NSW	Vic	Qld		WA	SA	Tas	ACT	NT	Total	
Party	HR	HR	HR	S	HR	HR	HR	HR	HR	HR	S
Australian Labor Party	47	33	18	*	8	11	5	1	1	124	1
Liberal Party of Australia	36	30	11	*	9	8	5	1		100	1
Australian Country Party	10	5	7		2					24	
Democratic Labor Party	32	33	18	*	6	8	5			102	1
Communist Party of Australia	9	4	2		2	3	1			21	
New Guinea Party	4									4	
Social Credit Party			2							2	
Australian Republican Party		1								1	
Independent and other	12	6	1		4	1	1			25	

== See also ==
- 1963 Australian federal election
- Members of the Australian House of Representatives, 1961–1963
- Members of the Australian House of Representatives, 1963–1966
- List of political parties in Australia
