= George Whitesides =

George Whitesides may refer to:

- George M. Whitesides (1939–2026), American chemist
- George T. Whitesides (born 1974), American space scientist, politician from California, and son of the above

== See also ==
- George Whiteside (1902–1976), Australian politician
