= 1963 Grey by-election =

A by-election was held for the Australian House of Representatives seat of Grey on 1 June 1963. This was triggered by the death of Labor MP Edgar Russell.

The by-election was won by Labor candidate Jack Mortimer.

== Results ==
Grey by-election, 1963
| Party | Candidate | Votes | % | ±% |
|---|---|---|---|---|
| Labor | Jack Mortimer | 21,463 | 51.3 | −6.9 |
| Liberal | Vern Dyason | 17,494 | 41.8 | +3.6 |
| Independent | Leonard Kent | 1,265 | 3.0 | +3.0 |
| Democratic Labor | Richard Mills | 935 | 2.2 | −1.4 |
| Independent Labor | Desmond Clark | 705 | 1.7 | +1.7 |
| Total formal votes | | 41,862 | 98.3 | |
| Informal votes | | 718 | 1.7 | |
| Turnout | | 42,580 | 91.8 | |
Two-party-preferred result
| Labor | Jack Mortimer | | 53.5 | −5.3 |
| Liberal | Vern Dyason | | 46.5 | +5.3 |
| Labor hold | | Swing | −5.3 | |
