= Lloyd O'Neil (politician) =

Australian politician

Member of the Australian Parliament for Grey
- In office 5 March 1983 – 8 February 1993
- Preceded by: Laurie Wallis
- Succeeded by: Barry Wakelin

Personal details
- Born: 24 June 1937 (age 88) Port Pirie, South Australia
- Party: Labor
- Occupation: Boilermaker

Lloyd Reginald Terrence O'Neil (born 24 June 1937) is an Australian former politician. He was a member of the House of Representatives from 1983 to 1993, representing the South Australian seat of Grey for the Australian Labor Party (ALP).

== Early life ==
O'Neil was born on 24 June 1937 in Port Pirie, South Australia. A boilermaker by profession, he became president of the Amalgamated Metal Workers and Shipwrights Union (AMWSU) and was a delegate to the Whyalla Trades and Labour Council.

== Politics ==
O'Neil was secretary of the ALP's Whyalla branch from 1970 to 1982. He worked as an electoral assistant to Grey MP Laurie Wallis, before succeeding him in federal parliament at the 1983 federal election.

In January 1991, O'Neil announced his support for Paul Keating to succeed Bob Hawke as leader of the ALP and prime minister. In May 1991, he supported Liberal MP Alasdair Webster's private member's bill that would ban the federal government from funding abortion, stating that abortions had resulted in a "deep disturbing trend of psychological harm and distress".

In December 1991, O'Neil announced that he would retire from politics at the next federal election. He is the most recent Labor representative for the Division of Grey, as the area has been held by the Liberal Party ever since.

Parliament of Australia
| Preceded by Laurie Wallis | Member for Grey; 1983–1993 | Succeeded by Barry Wakelin |
