= George Whiteside =

Australian politician

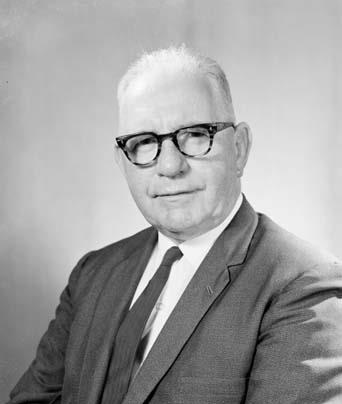

Senator for Queensland
- In office 9 October 1962 – 29 November 1963
- Preceded by: Max Poulter

Personal details
- Born: 20 September 1902 Footscray, Victoria, Australia
- Died: 27 July 1976 (aged 73) Brisbane, Queensland, Australia
- Party: Labor
- Occupation: Railway worker

George Irvine "Knobby" Whiteside (20 September 1902 – 27 July 1976) was an Australian trade unionist and politician. He was a member of the Australian Labor Party (ALP) and served as a Senator for Queensland from 1962 to 1963. He was the party's state president from 1959 to 1963.

== Early life ==
Whiteside was born on 20 September 1902 in Footscray, Victoria. He was the son of Caroline (née Hale) and John Whiteside. His father was a fitter.

Whiteside attended state schools in Melbourne. After leaving school he worked as a quarryman for a period and then began working for the Colonial Sugar Refinery at its Yarraville refinery. He joined the Australian Workers' Union in 1917 and lost his job for a period of seven months after taking part in a strike. In 1921, Whiteside moved to North Queensland, settling in Mossman. He subsequently worked as a canecutter and woodcutter on the construction of railways.

== Labour movement ==
In Queensland, Whiteside joined the Federated Engine Drivers' and Firemen's Association (FEDFA) and was appointed as a paid organiser in 1934. His worked "involved seven or eight months travel each year through North Queensland, visiting sugar mills, butter factories, sawmills, meatworks, electrical authorities, mines and roadworks".

Whiteside was elected as a FEDFA delegate to the Australian Council of Trade Unions in 1944, a role he held for nearly 20 years. He was the union's state secretary from 1946 to 1962. In 1959 he announced that the union would boycott any hotel that imposed a colour bar on patrons.

== Politics ==
Whiteside joined the Australian Labor Party (ALP) at a young age and served on the party's Queensland Central Executive (QCE) from 1946 to 1963. He was a delegate to five ALP federal conferences, served on the federal executive from 1959 to 1962, and was chairman of Labor Broadcasting Station Pty Ltd, the holding company for the 4KQ radio station.

Although Whiteside was an anti-communist, he remained loyal to the ALP during the party split of the mid-1950s and was among the QCE members who voted to expel Queensland premier Vince Gair in 1957, leading to Gair's creation of a breakaway Queensland Labor Party. Whiteside was appointed acting state president of the ALP in 1958, following the suspension of Joe Bukowski. He was formally elected as state president in 1959 and remained in the role until 1963, where he was involved in the purchase of a new state headquarters for the party at Newstead.

=== Senate ===
On 9 October 1962, Whiteside was elected by the parliament of Queensland to fill the casual vacancy caused by the death of ALP senator Max Poulter. Although he won a substantial majority in the vote, his election was controversial as the Coalition majority in the Queensland parliament had rejected the ALP's first-choice nominee, Alf Arnell.

Whiteside made only a single speech during his Senate service, in August 1963, although he regularly participated in question time. In his speech he advocated for an expansion of social security benefits, an expansion of the Senate committee system, and the creation of a body equivalent to implement the Bradfield Scheme to divert coastal rivers to the Outback.

In accordance with the constitutional provisions at the time, Whiteside faced re-election at a special election held in conjunction with the 1963 House of Representatives election. He was defeated by the Liberal Party candidate Kenneth Morris, with his term consequently ending on 30 November 1963. Whiteside again sought re-election at the 1964 Senate election, but was unsuccessful after being placed third on the ALP ticket behind incumbent senators Felix Dittmer and Jim Keeffe. His last candidacy for ALP preselection came in 1966.

== Personal life ==
Whiteside was unmarried. Outside of politics he was a supporter of Australian rules football in Queensland and served as patron of the Queensland Australian National Football League from 1963. He died in Brisbane on 28 July 1976, aged 73.
