= Don Jessop =

Australian politician

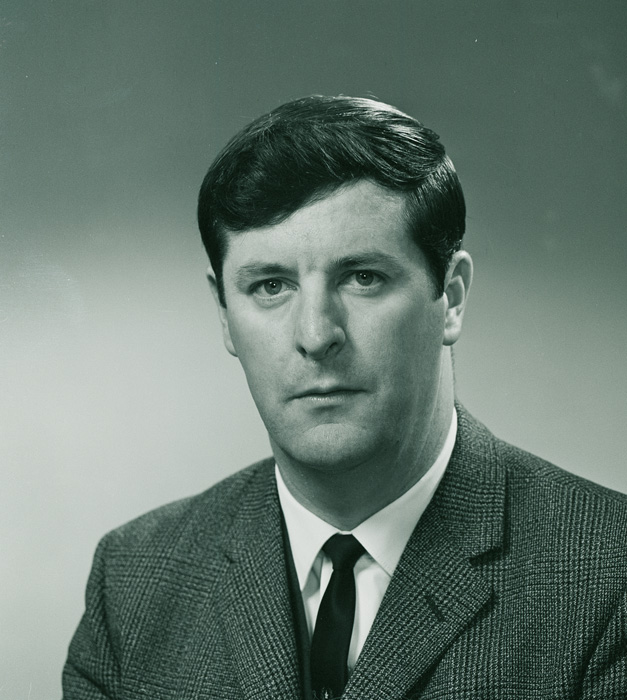

Senator for South Australia
- In office 1 July 1971 – 11 July 1987

Member of the Australian Parliament for Grey
- In office 26 November 1966 – 25 October 1969
- Preceded by: Jack Mortimer
- Succeeded by: Laurie Wallis

Personal details
- Born: 21 June 1927 Unley Park, South Australia, Australia
- Died: 21 May 2018 (aged 90) Adelaide, South Australia, Australia
- Party: Liberal (to 1987); Grey Power (1989)
- Other political affiliations: Independent (1987)
- Spouse: Barbara Maughan (m. 1949)
- Education: University of Adelaide
- Profession: Optometrist

Donald Scott Jessop (21 June 1927 – 21 May 2018) was an Australian politician. He served as a Senator for South Australia from 1971 to 1987, having previously served in the House of Representatives as the member for Grey from 1966 to 1969. He was a member of the Liberal Party until his preselection defeat just before the 1987 federal election, which he recontested unsuccessfully as an independent. He was an optometrist before entering politics.

== Early life ==
Jessop was born on 21 June 1927 in Unley Park, South Australia. He was the oldest of three sons born to Margaret Ada (née Scott) and Lindsay Newton Rennie Jessop.

Jessop was educated at Mitcham Primary School and Unley High School. With careers in medicine or pharmacy unavailable due to his colour blindness, he instead chose to pursue a career in optometry, taking a course at the University of Adelaide and undertaking further training with Laubman & Pank. He became a registered optometrist in 1949, working for Laubman & Pank in Port Pirie, Jamestown, and Broken Hill. In 1953 he established his own practice in Port Augusta.

== Politics ==
=== Early activities ===
Jessop joined the Port Augusta branch of the Liberal Party in 1955. He served on the Port Augusta City Council from 1960 to 1969.

Jessop was elected to the House of Representatives at the 1966 federal election, defeating the incumbent Australian Labor Party (ALP) MP Jack Mortimer in the seat of Grey. He campaigned on better transport for rural areas and greater development of mineral resources, travelling widely in his large electorate and occasionally using an aircraft lent by a supporter. He was defeated after only a single term, due to a large swing to Labor at the 1969 election and an unfavourable redistribution.

=== Senate career ===
At the 1970 half-Senate election, Jessop was elected to a six-year term commencing on 1 July 1971. His first term was cut short by a double dissolution and he would be re-elected on five further occasions.

In his maiden speech, Jessop called for an independent inquiry into social security in Australia, a national superannuation scheme, the abolition of death and estate taxes, and greater federal funding for remote areas. He was a prominent advocate for nuclear power on environmental grounds and supported greater federal involvement environmental policy, including a national authority controlling the River Murray and national policies for land use and water conservation.

Jessop remained a backbencher throughout his time in parliament. He was active on Senate committees, including as chair of the Standing Committee on Privileges from 1978 to 1983 and chair of the Standing Committee on Science and the Environment from 1978 to 1983. In 1981, he was appointed chair of a select committee into parliamentary staffing and appropriations. The committee's recommendations were adopted by the Fraser government and he subsequently became the inaugural chair of the Standing Committee on Appropriations and Staffing. He was the Coalition's nominee for the senate presidency in 1985 and 1987.

Jessop crossed the floor on 27 occasions during his career, the seventh-most of any senator in the period between 1950 and 2019. He was part of a group of "progressive Liberals" associated with Alan Missen who frequently crossed the floor. He also abstained from voting on a number of other occasions.

In June 1987, following a double dissolution, Jessop failed to win Liberal preselection for the Senate at the 1987 federal election. In the same month he announced that he would recontest his seat as an independent, campaigning with the assistance of the Australian Small Business Association as "your independent voice in the Senate". He was defeated for re-election.

== Later activities ==
Jessop returned to optometry after the end of his Senate term. He was an unsuccessful candidate on the Grey Power ticket at the 1989 South Australian state election, running for the Legislative Council. His platform included the abolition of age discrimination in private health insurance premiums.

== Personal life ==
In 1949, Jessop married Barbara Maughan, with whom he had three children. He died at his Adelaide home, aged 90, on 21 May 2018.

Parliament of Australia
Preceded by Jack Mortimer	Member for Grey; 1966–1969	Succeeded by Laurie Wallis
