= Max Poulter =

Australian politician

Dr Max Poulter
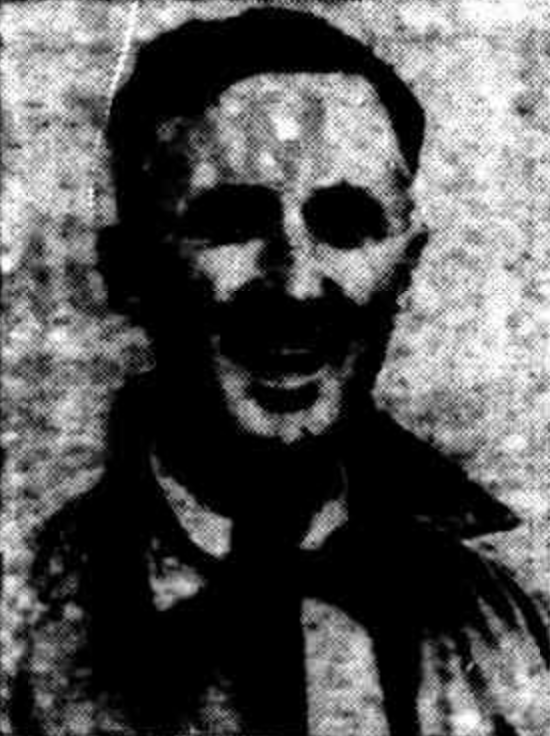

Senator for Queensland
- In office 1 July 1962 – 2 September 1962
- Succeeded by: George Whiteside

Personal details
- Born: Maxwell William Poulter; 22 January 1913 Devonport, Tasmania, Australia
- Died: 2 September 1962 (aged 49) Taringa, Queensland, Australia
- Party: Labor
- Spouses: Peggy Mead (m. 1941; div. 1953) Barbara Goodman (m. 1954)
- Education: University of Tasmania; Columbia University
- Occupation: Schoolteacher, academic

Maxwell William Poulter (22 January 1913 – 2 September 1962) was an Australian educator and politician. He held degrees from the University of Tasmania and Columbia University, including a doctorate in education from the latter. He was a high school teacher and later lectured at the University of Tasmania and University of Queensland. He had a long involvement with the Australian Labor Party (ALP) and was elected as a Senator for Queensland at the 1961 federal election, after two previous unsuccessful candidacies. He was unable to take his seat and died in 1962 two months after the start of his term.

== Early life ==
Poulter was born on 22 January 1913 in Devonport, Tasmania. He was the son of Cinderella Ismay (née Bowden) and William Poulter, his father being a storeman and produce agent. He was educated at Devonport Primary School and Devonport High School, leaving school in 1930.

Poulter became a probationary student-teacher in 1929 while still at high school and returned as an assistant master in 1936. He began studying at the University of Tasmania in 1931 and graduated Bachelor of Commerce (1937), Bachelor of Arts (1940), and Diploma of Education (1946). During World War II he joined the reserve of the Royal Australian Air Force (RAAF). Poulter worked in Tasmanian state high schools at Devonport, Hobart, Launceston and Burnie. He was vice-principal of Ogilvie High School in 1945.

== Academia ==
In 1947, Poulter was awarded a Tasmanian Government Travelling Scholarship to attend Columbia University in the United States. He graduated Master of Arts in 1949 and Doctor of Education in 1950, winning multiple scholarships. He subsequently returned to Tasmania and initially resumed his work as a high school teacher. In 1952, Poulter was appointed principal of the Launceston Teachers' College and became a part-time lecturer in education and educational psychology at the University of Tasmania. He returned to the United States in 1953 as a research fellow at Wayne State University, studying "the educational and social implications of television". Poulter joined the University of Queensland in 1954 as a lecturer in education, later being promoted to senior lecturer. He frequently travelled to country Queensland to conduct university extension programs.

== Politics ==
Poulter joined the ALP in 1938. He first stood for parliament at the 1951 federal election, losing to Liberal candidate Aubrey Luck in the Tasmanian seat of Darwin. After moving to Queensland he became president of the Toowong branch of the ALP.

At the 1958 federal election, Poulter was placed third on the ALP Senate ticket in Queensland. He was unsuccessful, but reprised his candidacy in 1961 and was elected to a term beginning on 1 July 1962. However, he became ill and was admitted to Princess Alexandra Hospital for two months, preventing him from taking his seat in the Senate and being sworn in.

Poulter died at his home in Taringa on 2 September 1962, aged 49. He was only the second senator to die without being sworn in, after Lionel Courtenay in 1935. He was cremated at Mount Thompson Crematorium.

The ALP nominated the unsuccessful candidate, Alf Arnell, to replace Poulter; however, he was rejected by the Queensland Legislative Assembly. The ALP then nominated George Whiteside who was appointed.

== Personal life ==
Poulter married Tasmanian schoolteacher Peggy Wilhelmina Mead in 1941, with whom he had a son and a daughter. He was divorced in 1953 and in 1954 married American film editor Barbara Goodman (née Baxter), with whom he had another two daughters.
