= Oliver Badman =

Australian politician (1885–1977)

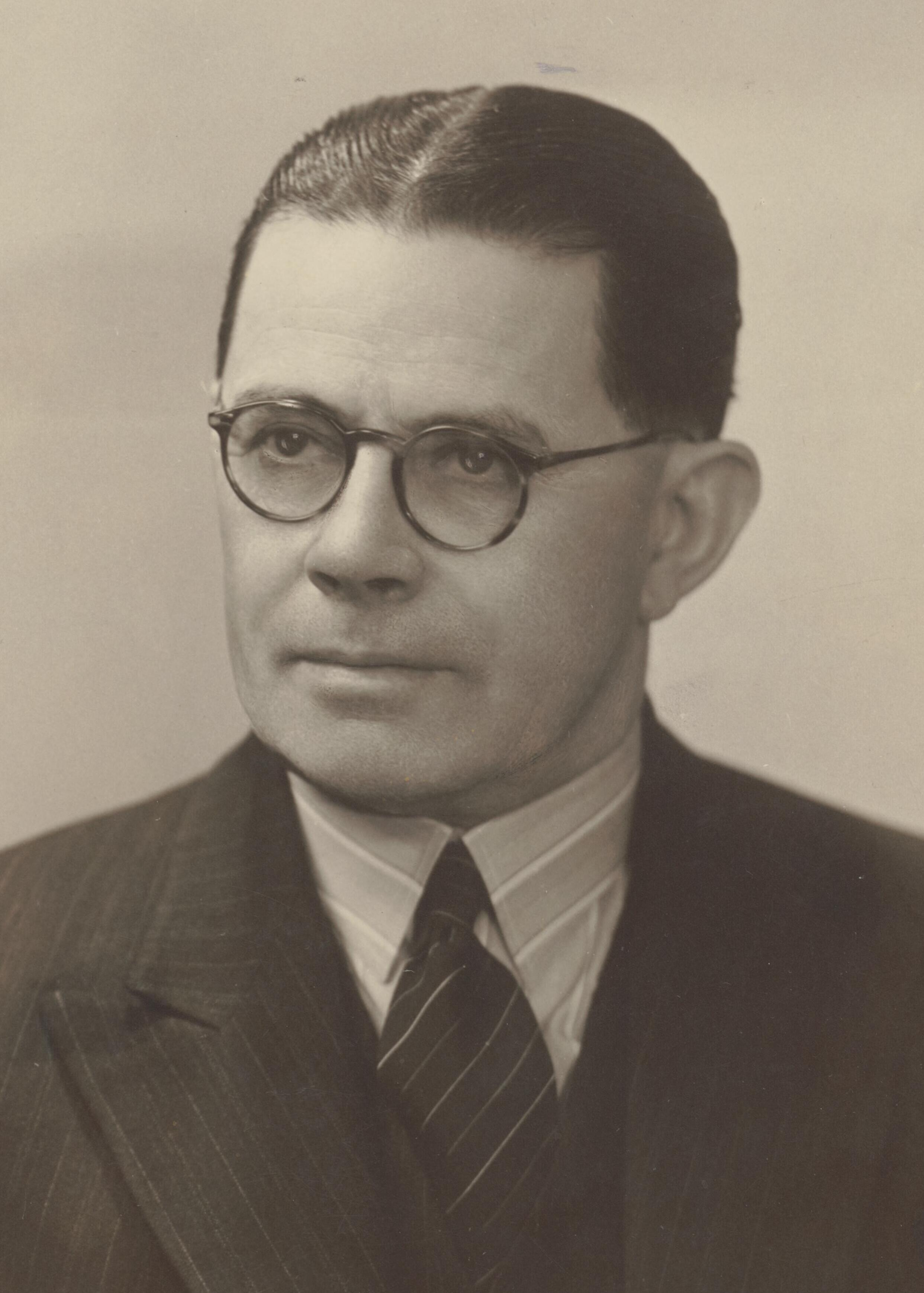

Senator for South Australia
- In office 1 July 1932 – 30 September 1937
- Succeeded by: Philip McBride

Member of the Australian Parliament for Grey
- In office 23 October 1937 – 21 August 1943
- Preceded by: Philip McBride
- Succeeded by: Edgar Russell

Personal details
- Born: Albert Oliver Badman; 18 December 1885 Yacka, South Australia, Australia
- Died: 24 April 1977 (aged 91) Wayville, South Australia, Australia
- Party: Country
- Spouse(s): Ann White (m. 1911; died 1952) Violet Nash (m. 1955)
- Occupation: Farmer

Albert Oliver Badman (18 December 1885 – 24 April 1977) was an Australian wheat farmer and politician. He was a Senator for South Australia from 1932 to 1937 and a member of the House of Representatives from 1937 to 1943, representing the seat of Grey. He was a long-serving member of the Country Party.

== Early life ==
Badman was born on 18 December 1885 on a farming property near Yacka, South Australia. He was the son of Agnes Mary (née Duffield) and Robert Badman. His paternal grandfather George Badman was a pioneering wheat farmer in the district, originally from Somerset, England.

Badman was raised on his family's wheat farm "Greenwich Hill" and attended the Yacka Public School. His father died when he was 16 years old and he subsequently co-managed the farm with his mother and sister. He developed a reputation as a progressive farmer, conducting experimental breeding of wheat varieties and holding annual open days. He won prizes at the Royal Adelaide Show for his collection of rust-resistant wheat strains and in 1924 was awarded a gold medal at the British Empire Exhibition for his collection of 150 varieties of wheat.

== Politics ==
Badman joined the Farmers' and Settlers' Association in about 1915 and became a foundation member of the South Australian Country Party in 1917. He served on the Georgetown District Council from 1924 to 1925.

Badman was an unsuccessful candidate for the seat of Stanley at the 1924 and 1930 state elections. At short notice and at the personal request of Prime Minister S. M. Bruce, he also stood unsuccessfully for the seat of Grey at the 1929 federal election.

=== Senate ===
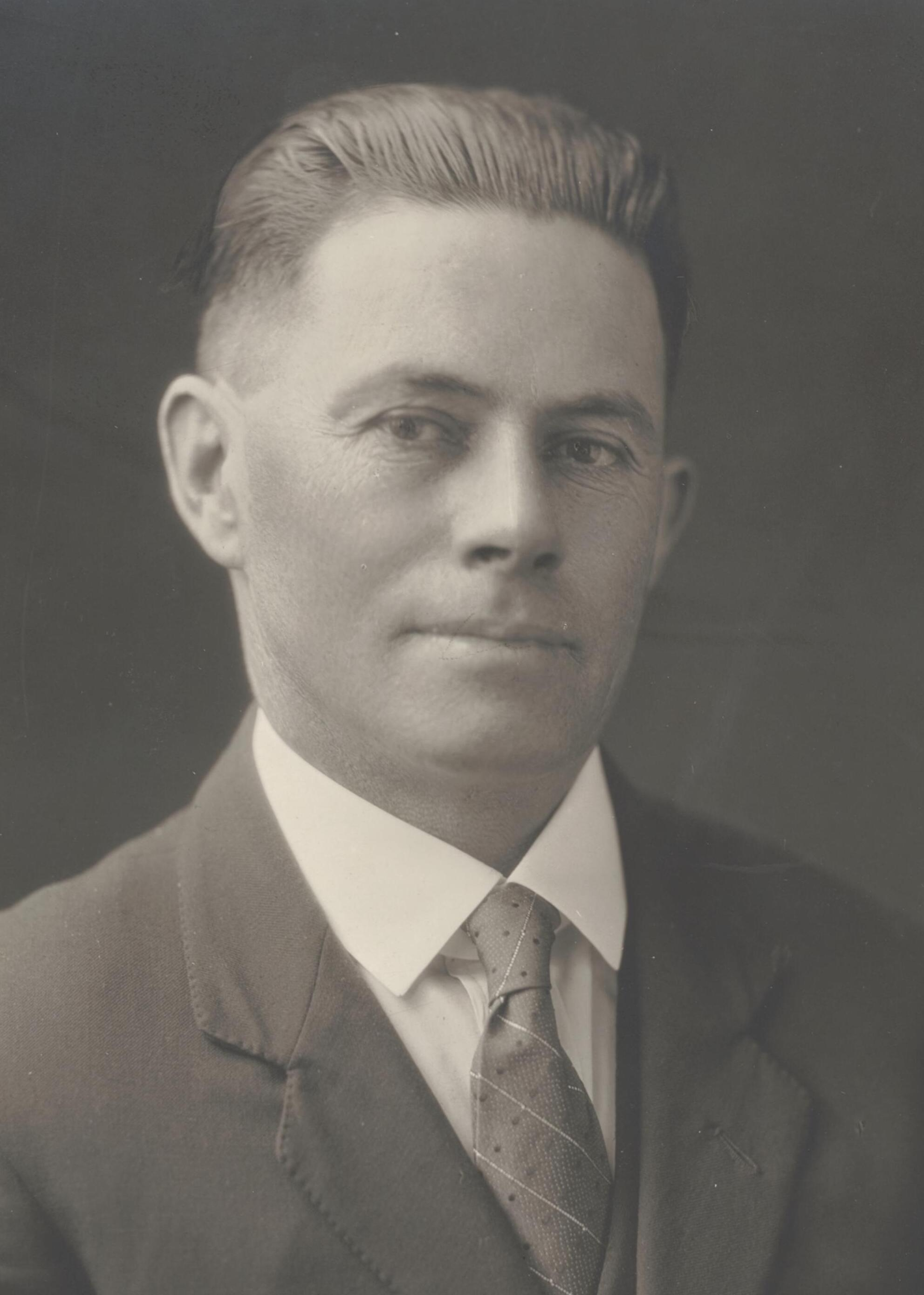
Badman as a young man

In 1931, Badman won Senate preselection on the ticket of the Emergency Committee of South Australia, an alliance of anti-Labor organisations. He was elected in third place on the Emergency Committee's ticket at the 1931 election to a term beginning on 1 July 1932.

Badman was involved in negotiating the formation of the Liberal and Country League (LCL) in early 1932, a merger of the Country Party and the Liberal Federation. The LCL candidates elected to parliament at the 1931 election were given the choice of joining either the parliamentary Country Party or the United Australia Party (UAP), with Badman the only LCL member to join the Country Party. In the Senate, Badman spoke infrequently and was mainly interested in government policy on primary industry and rural areas. He opposed the Lyons government's Wheat Growers Relief Bill on the grounds that it subsidised unsuccessful producers, and was opposed to the creation of compulsory wheat pools.

=== House of Representatives ===
Badman resigned from the Senate on 30 September 1937 in order to contest the House of Representatives at the 1937 federal election. As part of a deal arranged within the LCL, the incumbent UAP MP Philip McBride was elected to the Senate casual vacancy and Badman was then endorsed for preselection in Grey.

In April 1939, Badman was publicly critical of Country Party leader and interim prime minister Earle Page's speech attacking UAP leader Robert Menzies. On 4 May he announced that he would no longer attend meetings of the parliamentary Country Party while Page remained as leader, joining Arthur Fadden, Bernard Corser and Thomas Collins in sitting as "independent Country" members supporting Menzies' new government. He subsequently released a statement noting that he had "not tendered my resignation to the Country Party, nor do I intend joining any other", but that the LCL's constitution allowed him to choose which parliamentary party he would sit with.

Badman and the other defectors re-joined the parliamentary Country Party on 15 November 1939 at the invitation of his fellow South Australian MP Archie Cameron, who had replaced Page as leader two months earlier. He was a leading advocate of the Country Party re-entering into coalition government with the UAP, which eventually occurred in March 1940.

In parliament, Badman served on a number of parliamentary committees and acted as a temporary chairman of committees, notably serving on the Joint Standing Committee on War Expenditure and the Joint Statutory Committee on Public Works from 1940 to 1943. He lost his seat in the Australian Labor Party's landslide victory at the 1943 federal election.

== Personal life ==
In 1911, Badman married Ann White, with whom he had four children. He and his family moved to the Adelaide suburb of Kensington Park in 1926, leasing the family farm to sharecroppers, although he eventually returned to Yacka after the end of his political career. He was a Methodist lay preacher for over 30 years.

Badman was widowed in 1952 and in 1955 he remarried to Violet Nash. He died in Adelaide on 24 April 1977, aged 91.

Parliament of Australia
Preceded by Philip McBride	Member for Grey; 1937–1943	Succeeded by Edgar Russell
