= Tom Venning =

Australian politician

Tom Venning MP

Member of the Australian Parliament for Grey
- Incumbent
- Assumed office 3 May 2025
- Preceded by: Rowan Ramsey

Personal details
- Born: 26 January 1994 (age 32)
- Party: Liberal Party of Australia
- Spouse: Bonnie Wauchope
- Parents: Max Venning (father); Therese Venning (mother)
- Relatives: Ivan Venning (uncle); Howard Venning (grandfather)
- Website: tomvenning.com.au

Thomas Venning (born 26 January 1994) is an Australian politician from the Liberal Party of Australia. He was elected a member of the Australian Parliament for the Division of Grey in the 2025 Australian federal election. He succeeded Rowan Ramsey in the seat he had held since 2007. Venning is a farmer and former corporate consultant, living in Melbourne during this time, moving back to Bute in 2024, where his family has farmed for several generations.

== Personal life ==
His grandfather Howard Venning and uncle Ivan Venning were members of the South Australian House of Assembly.

Parliament of Australia
Preceded by Rowan Ramsey	Member for Grey; 2025–present	Incumbent
