= Laurie Wallis =

Australian politician (1922–1984)

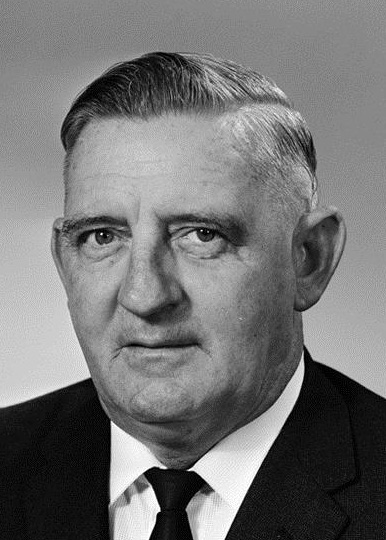

Member of the Australian Parliament for Grey
- In office 25 October 1969 – 4 February 1983
- Preceded by: Don Jessop
- Succeeded by: Lloyd O'Neil

Personal details
- Born: 10 September 1922 Thornleigh, New South Wales, Australia
- Died: 10 January 1984 (aged 61) Port Augusta, South Australia
- Party: Australian Labor Party

Laurie George Wallis (10 September 1922 – 10 January 1984) was an Australian politician. He was an Australian Labor Party member of the Australian House of Representatives from 1969 to 1983, representing the regional South Australian seat of Grey.

Wallis was born at Thornleigh in New South Wales and served in World War II from 1939 to 1941. A boilermaker by trade, he moved to South Australia to work for the Commonwealth Railways at Port Augusta in 1943. He was heavily involved in the trade union movement as secretary of the Port Augusta Combined Unions Council from 1947 to 1949 and 1959 to 1970 and secretary of the Port Augusta branch of the Boilermakers and Blacksmiths Society of Australia.

He was elected to the House of Representatives at the 1969 federal election, defeating one-term Liberal MP Don Jessop in the seat of Grey, then a marginal seat centred on industrial towns in western South Australia. He was re-elected five times, with the 1977 election - at which his seat doubled in geographic size - being his closest race, won by only 65 votes after three recounts. He retired due to ill health at the 1983 election.

Wallis died, aged 61, of lung cancer on 10 January 1984 in Port Augusta, South Australia. The Port Augusta Airport is also known as the "Laurie Wallis Aerodrome" in his honour.

Parliament of Australia
Preceded by Don Jessop	Member for Grey; 1969–1983	Succeeded by Lloyd O'Neil
