= 1963 Australian federal election =

- 30 November 1963

All 124 (Note: The Northern Territory and Australian Capital Territory each had one seat, but members for the territories did not have full voting rights until 1966 and did not count toward government formation.) seats of the Australian House of Representatives 62 seats were needed for a majority
- Registered: 5,824,917 ▲3.07%
- Turnout: 5,575,977 (95.73%) (▲0.46 pp)
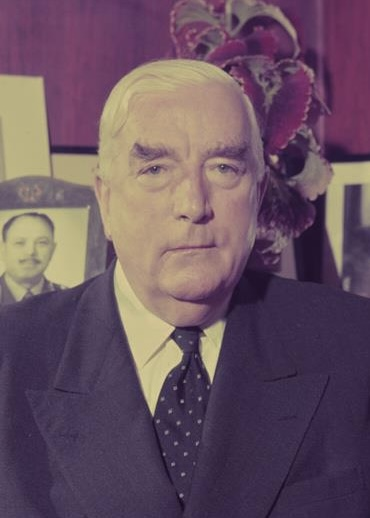

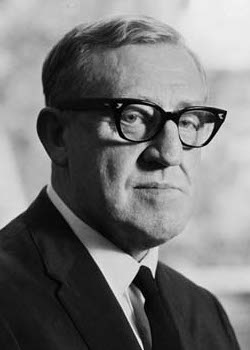
	First party	Second party
Leader	Sir Robert Menzies	Arthur Calwell
Party	Liberal–Country Coalition	Labor
Leader since	23 September 1943	7 March 1960
Leader's seat	Kooyong (Vic.)	Melbourne (Vic.)
Last election	62 seats	60 seats
Seats won	72	50 + NT + ACT
Seat change	▲10	▼10
Primary vote	2,520,321	2,489,184
Percentage	46.04%	45.47%
Swing	▲3.95	▼2.43
TPP	52.60%	47.40%
TPP swing	▲3.10	▼3.10
- Results by division for the House of Representatives, shaded by winning party's margin of victory.
Prime Minister before election
Sir Robert Menzies
Liberal/Country coalition
Subsequent Prime Minister
Sir Robert Menzies
Liberal/Country coalition

A federal election was held in Australia on 30 November 1963. All 122 seats in the House of Representatives were up for election. There was no Senate election until the 1964 Australian Senate election. The incumbent Liberal–Country coalition government, led by Prime Minister Sir Robert Menzies, won an increased majority over the opposition Labor Party, led by Arthur Calwell.

This was the only time that a Federal Government won a seventh consecutive term in office.

== Background ==
The election was held following the early dissolution of the House of Representatives. The Prime Minister of Australia, Sir Robert Menzies, gave as his reason for calling an election within two years that there was an insufficient working majority in the House. The 1961 election had been won with a substantially reduced majority of only two seats. One of the consequences of an early House election was that there were separate Senate and House elections until 1974. This became a factor in the Gair Affair.

The Coalition government of the Liberal Party led by Sir Robert Menzies and the Country Party led by John McEwen was returned with a substantially increased majority over the Australian Labor Party led by Arthur Calwell.

Indigenous Australians could vote in federal elections on the same basis as other electors for the first time in this election following an amendment to the Commonwealth Electoral Act becoming law on 1 November. The amendment enfranchised Indigenous people in Western Australia, Queensland and the Northern Territory. Indigenous voting rights in other states had been in place since 1949.

== Issues ==
=== State aid for non-government schools ===
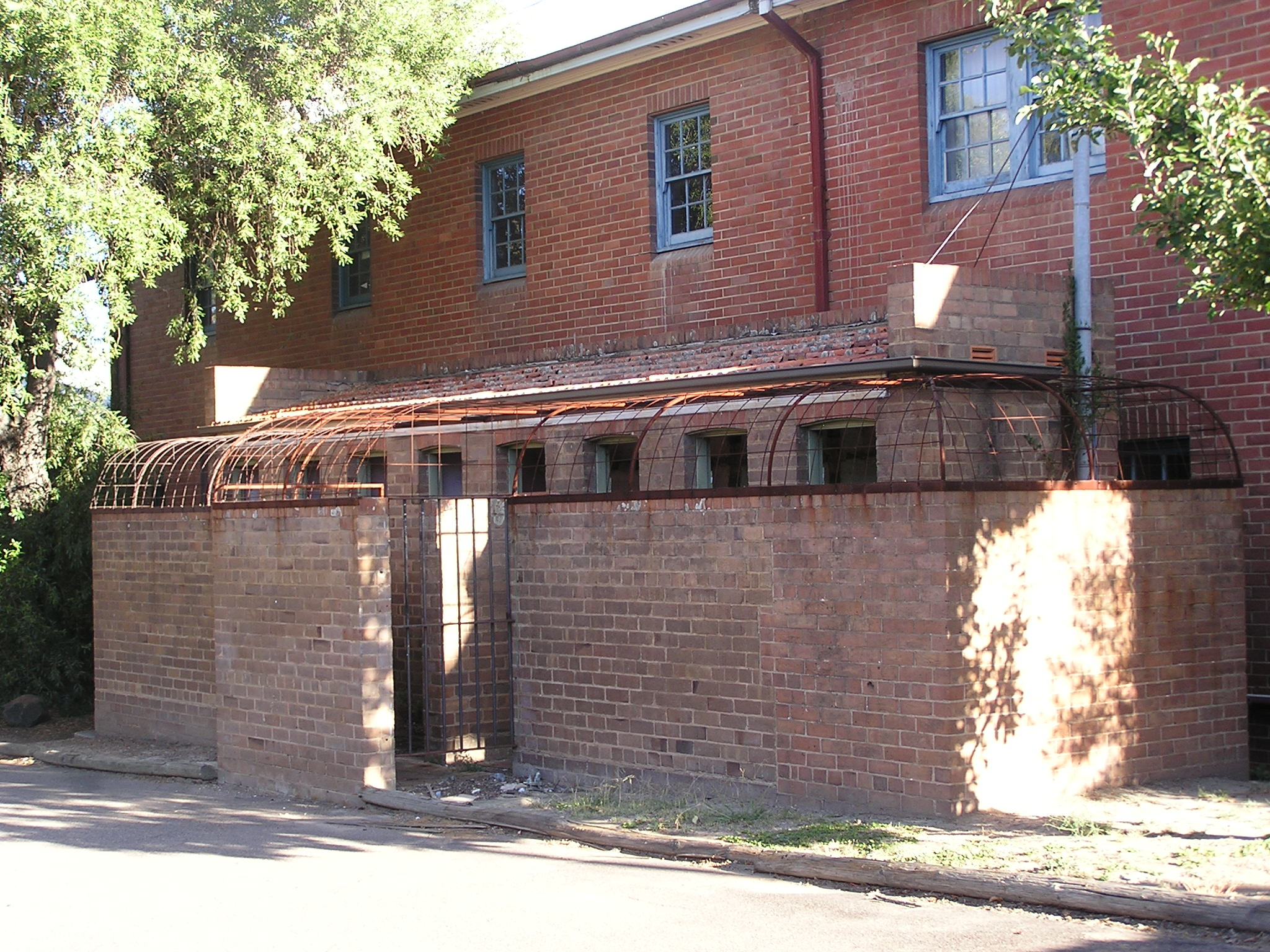
The toilets of St Brigid's; the reason for the 1962 school strike and the beginning of state aid to non-government schools.

The election was notable for the issue of state aid to non-government schools being finally resolved. There was a school strike in Goulburn, New South Wales in 1962. Health officials had requested the installation of three extra toilets at a Catholic primary school. The Catholic Church declared it had no money to install the extra toilets. The archdiocese closed down its schools and sent the children to government schools. Nearly 1,000 children turned up to be enrolled locally and the state schools were unable to accommodate them. The strike received national attention. The Labor premier of New South Wales, Robert Heffron, had promised money for science labs at non-government schools. This policy was overturned by a meeting of the Labor Party's federal executive. Under ALP rules the federal executive had responsibility for party policy when the party's national conference was out of session. Menzies called a snap election with state aid for science blocks and Commonwealth scholarships for students at both government and non-government schools as part of his party's platform. This tended to woo Catholic voters away from the Labor Party which they traditionally supported; the wedge driven between the ALP and its Catholic constituency took nearly a decade to overcome. Most non-government schools were Catholic. The Labor Party suffered a first-preference swing of −2.43% and the loss of ten seats. The Country Party vote was higher than the Democratic Labor Party (DLP) vote for the first time since 1955; the DLP had evolved from the Catholic wing of the ALP. The Liberal Party was, however, not dependent on the state-aid issue to win the election; other issues, such as the "36 faceless men" gibe, also did damage to the ALP.

=== North-west Cape communications facility ===
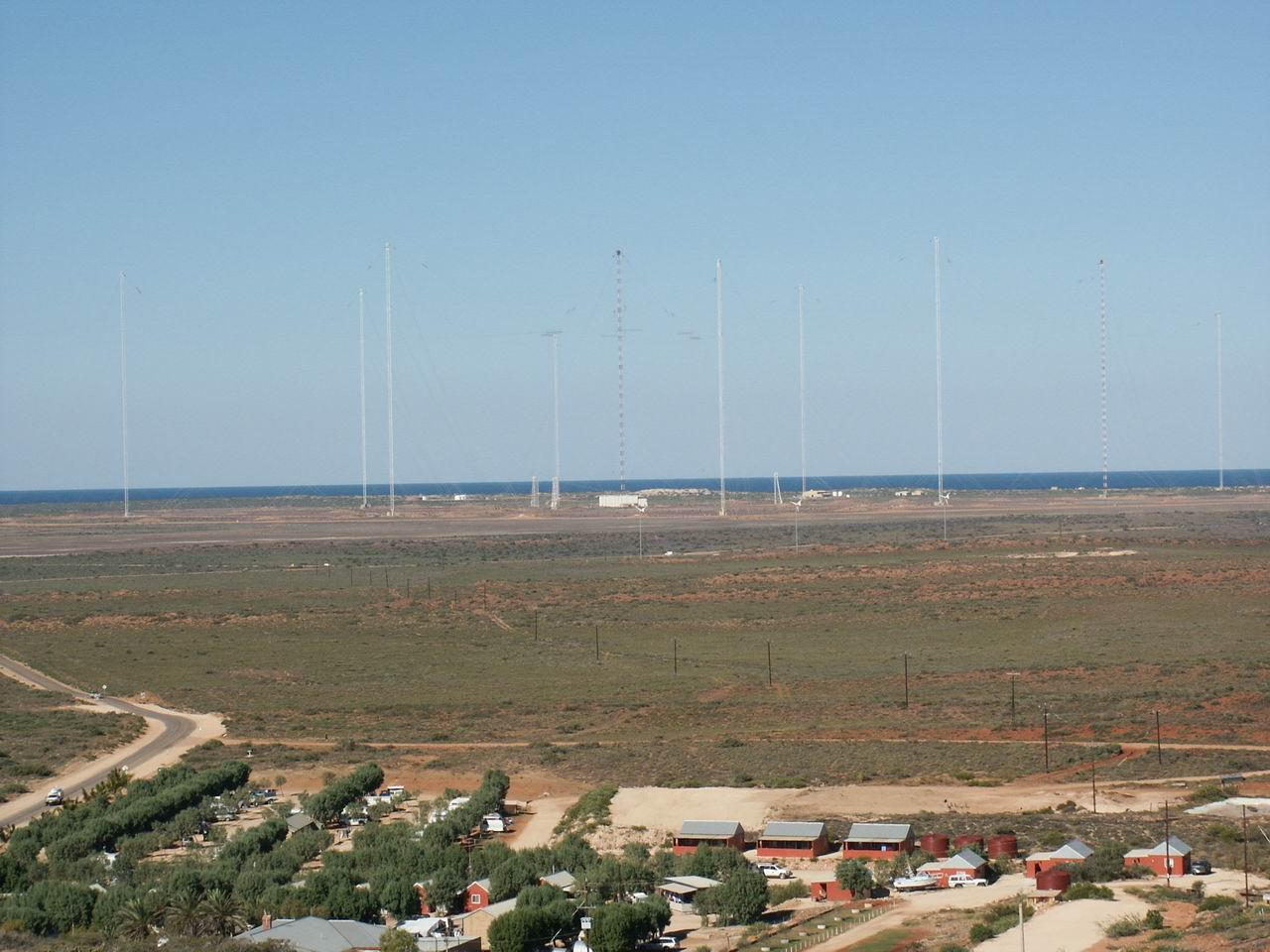
Naval Communication Station Harold E. Holt, the North-west Cape communications facility which was built in the 1960s

Other key issues in the election included the proposal by the United States to build the North-west Cape communications facility which would support the US nuclear submarine capability. A special federal conference of the ALP was called in March 1963 which, by a narrow margin, supported the base. The Left faction was opposed to a foreign base on Australian soil, especially one which supported America's nuclear weapons capability.

=== "36 faceless men" ===
During the ALP Federal Conference in March 1963, journalist Alan Reid commissioned a photograph of Arthur Calwell and Gough Whitlam standing outside the conference venue at Kingston, a suburb of Canberra. Although Calwell was the Leader of the Opposition in the House of Representatives and Whitlam was his deputy, neither man was eligible to attend the conference, which consisted of six members elected by each state ALP branch. Reid jibed that the ALP was ruled by "36 faceless men" – an accusation that was picked up by Menzies and the Liberal Party in its election material, and is still remembered more than 40 years later.

=== Assassination of US President Kennedy ===
The week before the election, on 22 November 1963, John F. Kennedy, the President of the United States, was assassinated. Alister McMullin, President of the Senate, represented Australia at the funeral in Washington. It has been suggested that this tragedy helped to consolidate Menzies' position.

== Results ==
House of Reps (IRV) – 1963–66—Turnout 95.73% (CV) – Informal 1.82%
Party	First preference votes	%	Swing	Seats	Change
Liberal–Country coalition	2,520,321	46.04	+3.95	72	+10
Liberal	2,030,823	37.09	+3.51	52	+7
Country	489,498	8.94	+0.43	20	+3
Labor	2,489,184	45.47	–2.43	52 (Note: Including Northern Territory and Australian Capital Territory)	–10
Democratic Labor	407,416	7.44	–1.27	0	0
Communist	32,053	0.59	+0.11	0	0
Independents	25,739	0.47	–0.21	0	0
Total	5,474,713			122	
Two-party-preferred (estimated)
Liberal–Country coalition	Win	52.60	+3.10	72	+10
Labor		47.40	–3.10	50	–10

See 1961 Australian federal election and 1964 Australian Senate election for Senate compositions.

First preference vote
Labor	45.47%
Liberal	37.09%
Country	8.94%
DLP	7.44%
Communist	0.59%
Independents	0.47%

Two-party-preferred vote (estimated)
Coalition	52.60%
Labor	47.40%

Parliament seats
Coalition	59.02%
Labor	40.98%

== Seats changing hands ==
Seat	Pre-1963			Swing	Post-1963		
Seat	Party	Member	Margin	Swing	Margin	Member	Party
Bowman, Qld	Labor	Jack Comber	1.9	3.3	1.4	Wylie Gibbs	Liberal
Canning, WA	Liberal	Neil McNeill	N/A	17.9	2.2	John Hallett	Country
Cowper, NSW	Labor	Frank McGuren	1.8	4.8	3.0	Ian Robinson	Country
Evans, NSW	Labor	James Monaghan	N/A	8.7	7.8	Malcolm Mackay	Liberal
Hume, NSW	Labor	Arthur Fuller	0.9	1.7	0.8	Ian Pettitt	Country
Lilley, Qld	Labor	Don Cameron	1.3	4.8	3.5	Kevin Cairns	Liberal
Mitchell, NSW	Labor	John Armitage	3.4	6.5	3.1	Les Irwin	Liberal
Parkes, NSW	Labor	Les Haylen	4.2	5.9	1.7	Tom Hughes	Liberal
Petrie, Qld	Labor	Reginald O'Brien	0.7	4.2	3.5	Alan Hulme	Liberal
Phillip, NSW	Labor	Syd Einfeld	1.4	4.2	2.8	William Aston	Liberal
St George, NSW	Labor	Lionel Clay	4.9	7.2	2.3	Len Bosman	Liberal

== See also ==
- Candidates of the Australian federal election, 1963
- Members of the Australian House of Representatives, 1963–1966
