= Division of Grey =

Australian federal electoral division

Coordinates: 29.604°S 135.454°E

Grey Australian House of Representatives Division
- Interactive map of boundaries since the 2019 federal election
- Created: 1903
- MP: Tom Venning
- Party: Liberal
- Namesake: Sir George Grey
- Electors: 128,719 (2025)
- Area: 908,595 km^{2} (350,810.5 sq mi)
- Demographic: Rural

The Division of Grey, soon to be renamed Division of O'Donoghue, is an Australian electoral division in South Australia. The division was one of the seven established when the former Division of South Australia was redistributed on 2 October 1903 and is named for Sir George Grey, who was Governor of South Australia from 1841 to 1845 (and later Prime Minister of New Zealand).

The electorate's administrative renaming – in honour of Dr Lowitja O'Donoghue – did not alter existing boundaries and was formally enacted on 8 October 2026; taking complete effect at the next Australian federal election to be held by 2028.

== Geography ==
The division covers the vast northern outback of South Australia. Highlighting South Australia's status as the second-most centralised state in Australia, Grey spans 908,595 square kilometres (350,810 sq mi), over 92 percent of the state. The borders of the electorate include Western Australia, the Northern Territory, Queensland and New South Wales borders, in addition to much of the southern coastal border. The electorate spans to Marion Bay and Eudunda in the south. The main population centres of the electorate include Ceduna, Port Lincoln, Whyalla, Port Augusta, Roxby Downs, Coober Pedy, Port Pirie, Kadina, Maitland, Orroroo, Booleroo Centre, Peterborough, Burra and Eudunda.

== Redistributions ==
Since 1984, federal electoral division boundaries in Australia have been determined at redistributions by a redistribution committee appointed by the Australian Electoral Commission (AEC). Redistributions occur for the boundaries of divisions in a particular state, and they occur every seven years, or sooner if a state's representation entitlement changes or when divisions of a state are malapportioned.

== Approved renaming ==
During proposed redistribution of electorates in South Australia after the 2025 Australian federal election, public submissions were requested for potential name changes to existing electorates. Grey was recommended to be changed to O’Donoghue in honour of Dr Lowitja O'Donoghue, a Yankunytjatjara woman and the first Indigenous nurse at the Royal Adelaide Hospital. She was also the inaugural chairperson of the Aboriginal and Torres Strait Islander Commission and a noted Indigenous rights advocate. The AEC agreed with the recommendation, citing O'Donogue's connection to the lands of the electorate and her work during her life. The AEC stated that while Sir George Grey had contributed to the establishment of the colony of South Australia, he was born and died outside Australia, and had little connection and contribution to Australia, while also citing the 1844 Aboriginal Witnesses Act passed by Grey.

== History ==
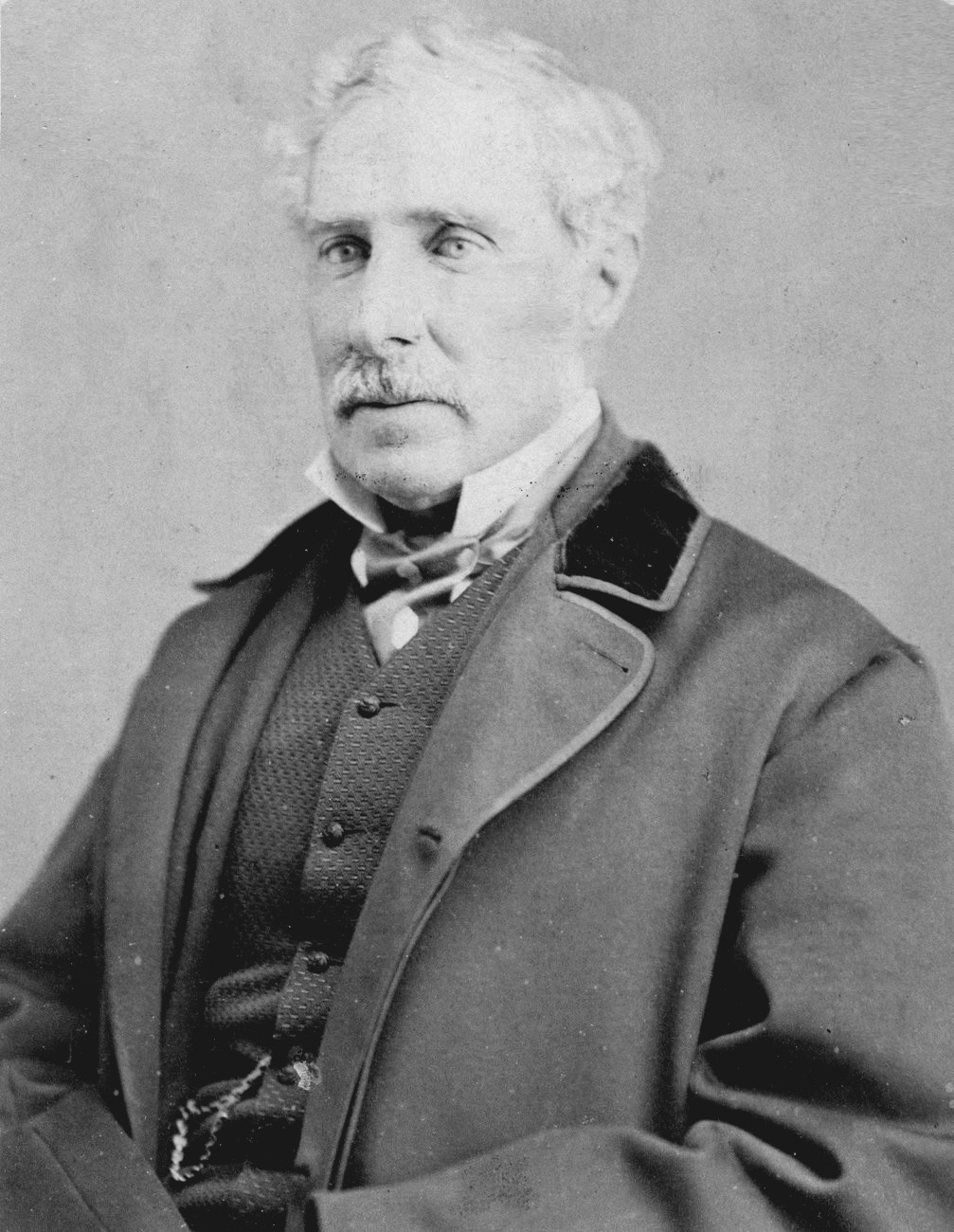
Sir George Grey, the division's namesake

When Grey was first created in 1903, it included the Northern Territory and all of northern and western South Australia, down to a line through the Mid North south of Port Pirie.

Following the 1949 redistribution it increased in size and covered almost five-sixths of the State of South Australia (111,000 square miles) from the borders with Western Australian and Northern Territory in the West and North to Queensland and New South Wales in the East. The remaining one-sixth of the State was covered by the other nine Federal Divisions for South Australia.

Grey was held by Labor for much of its history, and was one of the few country seats where Labor usually did well. It remained in Labor hands for all but one term from 1943 to 1993, the only break coming when the Liberals won it during their landslide victory in 1966. For most of that time, it was a fairly safe Labor seat, though it was almost lost in the Coalition landslides in 1975 and 1977.

That changed in 1993, when the retirement of Labor incumbent Lloyd O'Neil, the unpopularity of the state Labor government, and the addition of the Clare Valley at a redistribution which turned Grey in to a marginal seat, enabled Liberal Barry Wakelin become only the second non-Labor member to win the seat in 50 years. That happened even as Labor won another term; it was the first time Labor had won government at an election without winning Grey. However, the election came at a bad time for the state Labor government, which was roundly defeated at the state election later that year, at which Labor lost all but one seat within Grey's borders.

Wakelin was re-elected with a further swing in 1996, and since then the decline in the mining and pastoral vote has made it a fairly safe Liberal seat. While the "Iron Triangle" towns of Whyalla, Port Augusta and Port Pirie still tilt Labor — as they have for more than a century — they are not enough to overcome the increasingly conservative lean in the rest of the seat.

The Liberals consolidated their hold on the seat ahead of the 2004 election when the Yorke Peninsula and the state's upper east, both historically strongly conservative areas, were transferred to Grey from Wakefield. The Liberals suffered a nine-point swing at the 2007 election, but Rowan Ramsey was still able to retain the seat for the Liberals, with 54.4 percent of the two-party vote. The seat became secure for the Liberals once again after Ramsey picked up a large swing in 2010, which he consolidated in 2013. The 2025 landslide saw the Liberals reduced to 54.6 percent of the two-party vote.

=== 2016 election ===
South Australian Senator Nick Xenophon confirmed in December 2014 that by mid-2015 the Nick Xenophon Team (NXT) would announce candidates in all states and territories at the 2016 election, with Xenophon citing the government's ambiguity on the Collins-class submarine replacement project as motivation. ABC psephologist Antony Green's 2016 federal election guide for South Australia stated NXT had a "strong chance of winning lower house seats and three or four Senate seats".

Going into the 2016 election, Grey was the second-safest Liberal seat in South Australia; Labor needed a 13-point swing to win it. A ReachTEL seat-level opinion poll in Grey of 665 voters conducted by robocall on 9 June during the election campaign surprisingly found NXT candidate Andrea Broadfoot leading the Liberals' Ramsey 54–46 on the two-candidate preferred vote. Seat-level opinion polls in the other two rural Liberal South Australian seats revealed NXT also leading in both Mayo and Barker.

Early counting following the poll showed that Broadfoot was a clear second to Ramsey on first preferences, well ahead of the ALP candidate in third place. This meant that the indicative assessment of two-candidate preferred count on election night had been done between the wrong pair, and would need to be redone in the following week to give a clearer indication as to which of Ramsay and Broadfoot would win the seat after distributing all preferences. While Broadfoot was ahead with as much as 80 percent of ballots counted, she ultimately lost to Ramsey on Family First preferences. Ultimately, Ramsey suffered a swing of 11.6 percent after preferences were counted, which made Grey the most marginal Liberal seat in the state and one of the most marginal Coalition-held rural seats in the nation. On a "traditional" two-party basis (Labor vs. Liberal), however, Grey was still a fairly safe Liberal seat.

== Members ==
Image	Member	Party	Term	Notes
	Alexander Poynton (1853–1935)	Free Trade	16 December 1903 – May 1904	Previously held the Division of South Australia. Served as minister under Hughes. Lost seat
	Alexander Poynton (1853–1935)	Labor	May 1904 – 14 November 1916	Previously held the Division of South Australia. Served as minister under Hughes. Lost seat
	Alexander Poynton (1853–1935)	National Labor	14 November 1916 – 17 February 1917	Previously held the Division of South Australia. Served as minister under Hughes. Lost seat
	Alexander Poynton (1853–1935)	Nationalist	17 February 1917 – 16 December 1922	Previously held the Division of South Australia. Served as minister under Hughes. Lost seat
	Andrew Lacey (1887–1946)	Labor	16 December 1922 – 19 December 1931	Lost seat. Later elected to the South Australian House of Assembly seat of Port Pirie in 1933
	Philip McBride (1892–1982)	United Australia	19 December 1931 – 21 September 1937	Transferred to the Senate
	Oliver Badman (1885–1977)	Country	21 September 1937 – 4 May 1939	Previously a member of the Senate. Lost seat
	Oliver Badman (1885–1977)	Ind. Country	4 May 1939 – 15 November 1939	Previously a member of the Senate. Lost seat
	Oliver Badman (1885–1977)	Country	15 November 1939 – 21 August 1943	Previously a member of the Senate. Lost seat
	Edgar Russell (1890–1963)	Labor	21 August 1943 – 31 March 1963	Died in office
	Jack Mortimer (1912–1973)	Labor	1 June 1963 – 26 November 1966	Lost seat
	Don Jessop (1927–2018)	Liberal	26 November 1966 – 25 October 1969	Lost seat. Later elected to the Senate in 1970
	Laurie Wallis (1922–1984)	Labor	25 October 1969 – 4 February 1983	Retired
	Lloyd O'Neil (1937–)	Labor	5 March 1983 – 8 February 1993	Retired
	Barry Wakelin (1946–2023)	Liberal	13 March 1993 – 17 October 2007	Retired
	Rowan Ramsey (1956–)	Liberal	24 November 2007 – 28 March 2025	Retired
	Tom Venning (1994–)	Liberal	3 May 2025 – present	Incumbent

== Election results ==
2025 Australian federal election: Grey
Party	Candidate	Votes	%	±%
Liberal	Tom Venning	37,287	34.89	−10.43
Labor	Karin Bolton	24,053	22.50	+1.10
Independent	Anita Kuss	18,745	17.54	+17.54
One Nation	Brandon Turton	10,652	9.97	+3.71
Greens	Kathryn Hardwick-Franco	6,323	5.92	−0.86
Family First	Kylie Evans	3,856	3.61	+3.61
National	Peter Borda	3,288	3.08	+3.08
Trumpet of Patriots	Laury Hendrik Bais	2,677	2.50	+1.80
Total formal votes		106,881	92.88	−0.19
Informal votes		8,194	7.12	+0.19
Turnout		115,075	89.41	−0.21
Two-party-preferred result
Liberal	Tom Venning	58,402	54.64	−5.43
Labor	Karin Bolton	48,479	45.36	+5.43
Liberal hold		Swing	−5.43	
