= Edgar Russell =

Australian politician

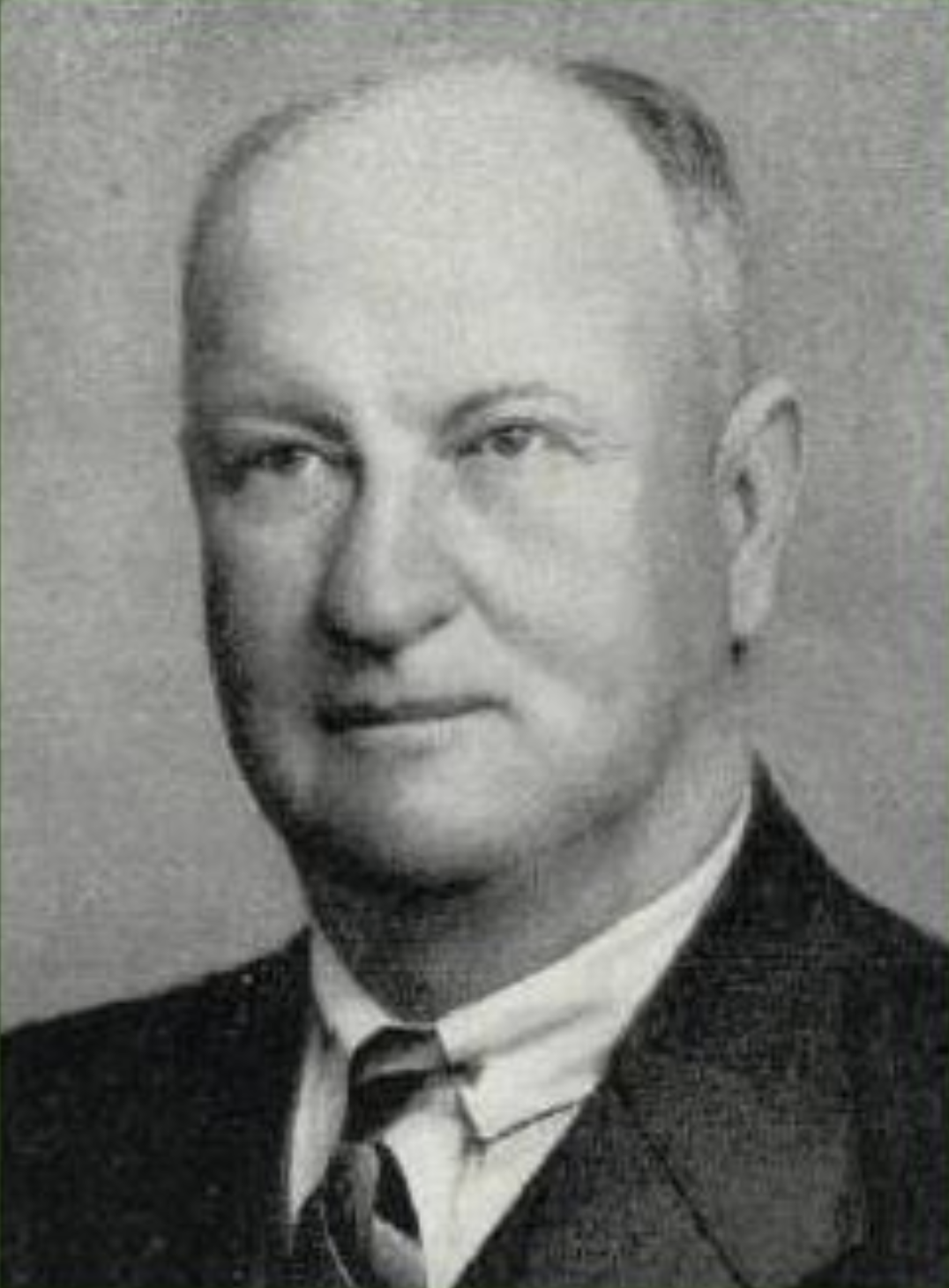

Member of the Australian Parliament for Grey
- In office 21 August 1943 – 31 March 1963
- Preceded by: Oliver Badman
- Succeeded by: Jack Mortimer

Personal details
- Born: 24 October 1890 Booleroo Centre, South Australia
- Died: 31 March 1963 (aged 72) Port Pirie, South Australia
- Party: Australian Labor Party
- Occupation: Bank clerk, accountant

Edgar Hughes Deg Russell (24 October 1890 – 31 March 1963) was an Australian politician.

Russell was born Edgar Hughes Degenhardt, to Carl August Degenhardt and Margaret "Maggie" Degenhardt, née Mackay, at Booleroo Centre. He was educated at public schools at Booleroo Centre and Port Germein. His family subsequently moved to Port Pirie, where his father was a four-time mayor of the City. He was a bank clerk and manager for the National Bank of Australia for twelve years in various towns before becoming a private accountant; he was also a certified local government auditor. He changed his surname to Russell, reportedly under pressure from the bank.

In 1943, he was elected to the Australian House of Representatives as the Labor member for Grey, defeating sitting United Australia Party member Oliver Badman. A long-term delegate to party conferences, he had defeated Australian Workers' Union nominee Charles Davis for Labor preselection. Though describing himself as a moderate, he won with the support of more militant unions. Russell held the seat until his death in 1963.

Parliament of Australia
| Preceded by Oliver Badman | Member for Grey; 1943–1963 | Succeeded by Jack Mortimer |
