= Jack Mortimer =

Australian politician

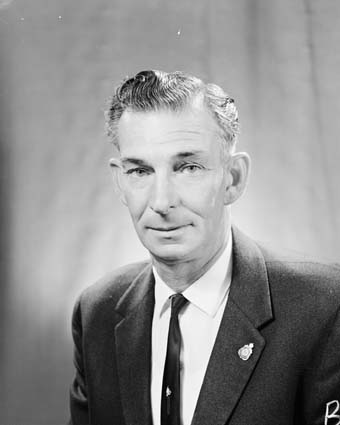

Member of the Australian Parliament for Grey
- In office 1 June 1963 – 26 November 1966
- Preceded by: Edgar Russell
- Succeeded by: Don Jessop

Personal details
- Born: 30 October 1912 Magill, South Australia
- Died: 8 February 1973 (aged 60) Port Hedland, Western Australia
- Party: Australian Labor Party
- Spouse: Melva Winfield Bähr
- Children: 2
- Occupation: Waterside worker

Jack Mortimer (30 October 1912 – 8 February 1973) was an Australian politician. He received a primary education before becoming a farmer in South Australia. He served in the military from 1942 to 1946 and returned as a waterside worker in Port Lincoln where he was a branch secretary of the Waterside Workers' Federation. In 1963, he was elected to the Australian House of Representatives as the Labor member for Grey. He held the seat until his defeat in 1966, after which he became a businessman in Port Lincoln. Mortimer died by drowning at Port Hedland in 1973.

== Personal life ==
Mortimer married Melva Bähr, of Ceduna, in 1939. They had a daughter and a son, and farmed at Karkoo.

Parliament of Australia
Preceded by Edgar Russell	Member for Grey; 1963–1966	Succeeded by Don Jessop
