= List of Australian federal by-elections =

This is a list of by-elections for the Australian House of Representatives from its creation in 1901 until the present day.

Casual vacancies in the House of Representatives arise when a member dies, is disqualified or resigns, or for some other reason the seat becomes vacant. Members normally resign by tendering resignation to the Speaker of the House of Representatives.

Casual vacancies are filled by by-elections. The Speaker has a discretion as to when to call a by-election and may not call one at all, for example, if a general election is imminent. At least 33 days must elapse between the issue by the Speaker of a writ and the date of a by-election, and the Speaker cannot issue the writ until receipt of a formal letter of resignation. A by-election must take place on a Saturday.

A supplementary election is held in an electorate following a scheduled general election if the election is not held.

== List of federal by-elections ==
In the following table, seats lost by the incumbent party are highlighted in colour.

Brackets around dates indicate a candidate was unopposed when nominations closed. These candidates were declared elected from the date of the closing of nominations, without a by-election.

=== 48th Parliament (2025–present) ===
Division	Date	Cause	Former member	Party	Winner	Party
Farrer	9 May 2026	Resignation	Sussan Ley	Liberal	David Farley	One Nation
=== 47th Parliament (2022–2025) ===
Division	Date	Cause	Former member	Party	Winner	Party
Cook	13 April 2024	Resignation	Scott Morrison	Liberal	Simon Kennedy	Liberal
Dunkley	2 March 2024	Death	Peta Murphy	Labor	Jodie Belyea	Labor
Fadden	15 July 2023	Resignation	Stuart Robert	Liberal National	Cameron Caldwell	Liberal National
Aston	1 April 2023	Resignation	Alan Tudge	Liberal	Mary Doyle	Labor
=== 46th Parliament (2019–2022) ===
Division	Date	Cause	Former member	Party	Winner	Party
Groom	28 November 2020	Resignation	John McVeigh	Liberal National	Garth Hamilton	Liberal National
Eden-Monaro	4 July 2020	Resignation	Mike Kelly	Labor	Kristy McBain	Labor
=== 45th Parliament (2016–2019) ===
Division	Date	Cause	Former member	Party	Winner	Party
Wentworth	20 October 2018	Resignation	Malcolm Turnbull	Liberal	Kerryn Phelps	Independent
Braddon	28 July 2018	Resignation (ineligibility)	Justine Keay	Labor	Justine Keay	Labor
Fremantle	28 July 2018	Resignation (ineligibility)	Josh Wilson	Labor	Josh Wilson	Labor
Longman	28 July 2018	Resignation (ineligibility)	Susan Lamb	Labor	Susan Lamb	Labor
Mayo	28 July 2018	Resignation (ineligibility)	Rebekha Sharkie	Centre Alliance	Rebekha Sharkie	Centre Alliance
Perth	28 July 2018	Resignation	Tim Hammond	Labor	Patrick Gorman	Labor
Batman	17 March 2018	Resignation (ineligibility)	David Feeney	Labor	Ged Kearney	Labor
Bennelong	16 December 2017	Resignation	John Alexander	Liberal	John Alexander	Liberal
New England	2 December 2017	Disqualification	Barnaby Joyce	National	Barnaby Joyce	National
=== 44th Parliament (2013–2016) ===
Division	Date	Cause	Former member	Party	Winner	Party
North Sydney	5 December 2015	Resignation	Joe Hockey	Liberal	Trent Zimmerman	Liberal
Canning	19 September 2015	Death	Don Randall	Liberal	Andrew Hastie	Liberal
Griffith	8 February 2014	Resignation	Kevin Rudd	Labor	Terri Butler	Labor
=== 43rd Parliament (2010–2013) ===
No by-elections held
=== 42nd Parliament (2007–2010) ===
Division	Date	Cause	Former member	Party	Winner	Party
Higgins	5 December 2009	Resignation	Peter Costello	Liberal	Kelly O'Dwyer	Liberal
Bradfield	5 December 2009	Resignation	Brendan Nelson	Liberal	Paul Fletcher	Liberal
Lyne	6 September 2008	Resignation	Mark Vaile	National	Rob Oakeshott	Independent
Mayo	6 September 2008	Resignation	Alexander Downer	Liberal	Jamie Briggs	Liberal
Gippsland	28 June 2008	Resignation	Peter McGauran	National	Darren Chester	National
=== 41st Parliament (2004–2007) ===
Division	Date	Cause	Former member	Party	Winner	Party
Werriwa	19 March 2005	Resignation	Mark Latham	Labor	Chris Hayes	Labor
=== 40th Parliament (2001–2004) ===
Division	Date	Cause	Former member	Party	Winner	Party
Cunningham	19 October 2002	Resignation	Stephen Martin	Labor	Michael Organ	Greens
=== 39th Parliament (1998–2001) ===
Division	Date	Cause	Former member	Party	Winner	Party
Aston	14 July 2001	Death	Peter Nugent	Liberal	Chris Pearce	Liberal
Ryan	17 March 2001	Resignation	John Moore	Liberal	Leonie Short	Labor
Isaacs	12 August 2000	Death	Greg Wilton	Labor	Ann Corcoran	Labor
Holt	6 November 1999	Resignation	Gareth Evans	Labor	Anthony Byrne	Labor
=== 38th Parliament (1996–1998) ===
Division	Date	Cause	Former member	Party	Winner	Party
Fraser	1 February 1997	Resignation	John Langmore	Labor	Steve Dargavel	Labor
Lindsay	19 October 1996	Disqualification	Jackie Kelly	Liberal	Jackie Kelly	Liberal
Blaxland	15 June 1996	Resignation	Paul Keating	Labor	Michael Hatton	Labor
=== 37th Parliament (1993–1996) ===
Division	Date	Cause	Former member	Party	Winner	Party
Wentworth	8 April 1995	Resignation	John Hewson	Liberal	Andrew Thomson	Liberal
Canberra	25 March 1995	Resignation	Ros Kelly	Labor	Brendan Smyth	Liberal
Kooyong	19 November 1994	Resignation	Andrew Peacock	Liberal	Petro Georgiou	Liberal
Mackellar	26 March 1994	Resignation	Jim Carlton	Liberal	Bronwyn Bishop	Liberal
Warringah	26 March 1994	Resignation	Michael MacKellar	Liberal	Tony Abbott	Liberal
Bonython	19 March 1994	Resignation	Neal Blewett	Labor	Martyn Evans	Labor
Fremantle	12 March 1994	Resignation	John Dawkins	Labor	Carmen Lawrence	Labor
Werriwa	29 January 1994	Resignation	John Kerin	Labor	Mark Latham	Labor
=== 36th Parliament (1990–1993) ===
Division	Date	Cause	Former member	Party	Winner	Party
Wills	11 April 1992	Resignation	Bob Hawke	Labor	Phil Cleary	Independent
Menzies	11 May 1991	Resignation	Neil Brown	Liberal	Kevin Andrews	Liberal
=== 35th Parliament (1987–1990) ===
Division	Date	Cause	Former member	Party	Winner	Party
Gwydir	15 April 1989	Resignation	Ralph Hunt	National	John Anderson	National
Oxley	8 October 1988	Resignation (appointed Governor-General)	Bill Hayden	Labor	Les Scott	Labor
Groom	9 April 1988	Resignation	Tom McVeigh	National	Bill Taylor	Liberal
Port Adelaide	26 March 1988	Resignation	Mick Young	Labor	Rod Sawford	Labor
Adelaide	6 February 1988	Resignation	Chris Hurford	Labor	Mike Pratt	Liberal
=== 34th Parliament (1984–1987) ===
Division	Date	Cause	Former member	Party	Winner	Party
Scullin	8 February 1986	Resignation	Harry Jenkins Sr.	Labor	Harry Jenkins	Labor
=== 33rd Parliament (1983–1984) ===
Division	Date	Cause	Former member	Party	Winner	Party
Corangamite	18 February 1984	Resignation	Tony Street	Liberal	Stewart McArthur	Liberal
Hughes	18 February 1984	Resignation	Les Johnson	Labor	Robert Tickner	Labor
Richmond	18 February 1984	Resignation	Doug Anthony	National	Charles Blunt	National
Moreton	5 November 1983	Resignation	James Killen	Liberal	Don Cameron	Liberal
Bruce	28 May 1983	Resignation	Billy Snedden	Liberal	Ken Aldred	Liberal
Wannon	7 May 1983	Resignation	Malcolm Fraser	Liberal	David Hawker	Liberal
=== 32nd Parliament (1980–1983) ===
Division	Date	Cause	Former member	Party	Winner	Party
Flinders	4 December 1982	Resignation	Phillip Lynch	Liberal	Peter Reith	Liberal
Lowe	13 March 1982	Resignation	William McMahon	Liberal	Michael Maher	Labor
Wentworth	11 April 1981	Resignation	Bob Ellicott	Liberal	Peter Coleman	Liberal
Boothby	21 February 1981	Resignation	John McLeay	Liberal	Steele Hall	Liberal
Curtin	21 February 1981	Resignation	Victor Garland	Liberal	Allan Rocher	Liberal
McPherson	21 February 1981	Death	Eric Robinson	Liberal	Peter White	Liberal
=== 31st Parliament (1977–1980) ===
Division	Date	Cause	Former member	Party	Winner	Party
Grayndler	23 June 1979	Death	Frank Stewart	Labor	Leo McLeay	Labor
Werriwa	23 September 1978	Resignation	Gough Whitlam	Labor	John Kerin	Labor
=== 30th Parliament (1975–1977) ===
Division	Date	Cause	Former member	Party	Winner	Party
Cunningham	25 October 1977	Death	Rex Connor	Labor	Stewart West	Labor
=== 29th Parliament (1974–1975) ===
Division	Date	Cause	Former member	Party	Winner	Party
Bass	28 June 1975	Resignation	Lance Barnard	Labor	Kevin Newman	Liberal
=== 28th Parliament (1972–1974) ===
Division	Date	Cause	Former member	Party	Winner	Party
Parramatta	22 September 1973	Resignation	Nigel Bowen	Liberal	Philip Ruddock	Liberal
=== 27th Parliament (1969–1972) ===
Division	Date	Cause	Former member	Party	Winner	Party
Murray	20 March 1971	Resignation	John McEwen	Country	Bruce Lloyd	Country
Chisholm	19 September 1970	Death	Wilfrid Kent Hughes	Liberal	Tony Staley	Liberal
Australian Capital Territory	30 May 1970	Death	Jim Fraser	Labor	Kep Enderby	Labor
=== 26th Parliament (1966–1969) ===
Division	Date	Cause	Former member	Party	Winner	Party
Bendigo	7 June 1969	Resignation	Noel Beaton	Labor	David Kennedy	Labor
Gwydir	7 June 1969	Resignation	Ian Allan	Country	Ralph Hunt	Country
Curtin	19 April 1969	Resignation	Paul Hasluck	Liberal	Victor Garland	Liberal
Higgins	24 February 1968	Death (presumed drowning)	Harold Holt	Liberal	John Gorton	Liberal
Capricornia	30 September 1967	Death	George Gray	Labor	Doug Everingham	Labor
Corio	22 July 1967	Resignation	Hubert Opperman	Liberal	Gordon Scholes	Labor
=== 25th Parliament (1963–1966) ===
Division	Date	Cause	Former member	Party	Winner	Party
Kooyong	2 April 1966	Resignation	Robert Menzies	Liberal	Andrew Peacock	Liberal
Dawson	26 February 1966	Death	George Shaw	Country	Rex Patterson	Labor
Riverina	27 February 1965	Resignation	Hugh Roberton	Country	Bill Armstrong	Country
Robertson	5 December 1964	Resignation	Roger Dean	Liberal	William Bridges-Maxwell	Liberal
Angas	20 June 1964	Resignation	Alick Downer	Liberal	Geoffrey Giles	Liberal
Parramatta	20 June 1964	Resignation	Garfield Barwick	Liberal	Nigel Bowen	Liberal
Denison	15 February 1964	Death	Athol Townley	Liberal	Adrian Gibson	Liberal
=== 24th Parliament (1961–1963) ===
Division	Date	Cause	Former member	Party	Winner	Party
East Sydney	28 September 1963	Death	Eddie Ward	Labor	Len Devine	Labor
Grey	1 June 1963	Death	Edgar Russell	Labor	Jack Mortimer	Labor
Batman	1 September 1962	Death	Alan Bird	Labor	Sam Benson	Labor
=== 23rd Parliament (1958–1961) ===
Division	Date	Cause	Former member	Party	Winner	Party
Higinbotham	10 December 1960	Death	Frank Timson	Liberal	Don Chipp	Liberal
Calare	5 November 1960	Resignation	John Howse	Liberal	John England	Country
Balaclava	16 July 1960	Resignation	Percy Joske	Liberal	Ray Whittorn	Liberal
Bendigo	16 July 1960	Death	Percy Clarey	Labor	Noel Beaton	Labor
Hunter	9 April 1960	Resignation	H. V. Evatt	Labor	Bert James	Labor
La Trobe	9 April 1960	Resignation	Richard Casey	Liberal	John Jess	Liberal
=== 22nd Parliament (1955–1958) ===
Division	Date	Cause	Former member	Party	Winner	Party
Parramatta	8 March 1958	Resignation	Howard Beale	Liberal	Garfield Barwick	Liberal
Richmond	15 September 1957	Death	Larry Anthony	Country	Doug Anthony	Country
Wentworth	8 December 1956	Resignation	Eric Harrison	Liberal	Les Bury	Liberal
Barker	13 October 1956	Death	Archie Cameron	Liberal	Jim Forbes	Liberal
Cunningham	(11 April 1956)	Death	Billy Davies	Labor	Victor Kearney	Labor
=== 21st Parliament (1954–1955) ===
Division	Date	Cause	Former member	Party	Winner	Party
Cook	21 May 1955	Death	Tom Sheehan	Labor	Jim Cope	Labor
=== 20th Parliament (1951–1954) ===
Division	Date	Cause	Former member	Party	Winner	Party
Gwydir	19 December 1953	Death	Thomas Treloar	Country	Ian Allan	Country
Corangamite	29 August 1953	Death	Allan McDonald	Liberal	Dan Mackinnon	Liberal
Lang	29 August 1953	Death	Dan Mulcahy	Labor	Frank Stewart	Labor
Dalley	9 May 1953	Death	Sol Rosevear	Labor	Arthur Greenup	Labor
Bradfield	20 December 1952	Death	Billy Hughes	Liberal	Harry Turner	Liberal
Werriwa	29 November 1952	Death	Bert Lazzarini	Labor	Gough Whitlam	Labor
Flinders	18 October 1952	Death	Rupert Ryan	Liberal	Keith Ewert	Labor
Lyne	22 March 1952	Death	Jim Eggins	Country	Philip Lucock	Country
Balaclava	28 July 1951	Resignation	Thomas White	Liberal	Percy Joske	Liberal
Macquarie	28 July 1951	Death	Ben Chifley	Labor	Tony Luchetti	Labor
=== 19th Parliament (1949–1951) ===
No by-elections held
=== 18th Parliament (1946–1949) ===
No by-elections held
=== 17th Parliament (1943–1946) ===
Division	Date	Cause	Former member	Party	Winner	Party
Henty	30 March 1946	Resignation	Arthur Coles	Independent	Jo Gullett	Liberal
Wimmera	9 February 1946	Resignation	Alexander Wilson	Independent	Winton Turnbull	Country
Fremantle	18 August 1945	Death	John Curtin	Labor	Kim Beazley	Labor
=== 16th Parliament (1940–1943) ===
Division	Date	Cause	Former member	Party	Winner	Party
Boothby	24 May 1941	Death	John Price	United Australia	Grenfell Price	United Australia
Swan	21 December 1940	Death	Henry Gregory	Country	Thomas Marwick	Country
Kalgoorlie	16 November 1940	Death	Albert Green	Labor	Herbert Johnson	Labor
=== 15th Parliament (1937–1940) ===
Division	Date	Cause	Former member	Party	Winner	Party
Corio	2 March 1940	Resignation	Richard Casey	United Australia	John Dedman	Labor
Wilmot	27 May 1939	Death	Joseph Lyons	United Australia	Lancelot Spurr	Labor
Griffith	20 May 1939	Death	Frank Baker	Labor	William Conelan	Labor
Wakefield	10 December 1938	Death (aircraft crash)	Charles Hawker	United Australia	Sydney McHugh	Labor
=== 14th Parliament (1934–1937) ===
Division	Date	Cause	Former member	Party	Winner	Party
Gwydir	8 May 1937	Resignation	Aubrey Abbott	Country	William Scully	Labor
Darling Downs	19 December 1936	Death	Littleton Groom	United Australia	Arthur Fadden	Country
Kennedy	12 December 1936	Death	Darby Riordan	Labor	Bill Riordan	Labor
Fawkner	17 August 1935	Death	George Maxwell	United Australia	Harold Holt	United Australia
Newcastle	1 June 1935	Death	David Watkins	Labor	David Watkins	Labor
=== 13th Parliament (1931–1934) ===
Division	Date	Cause	Former member	Party	Winner	Party
Flinders	11 November 1933	Resignation	Stanley Bruce	United Australia	James Fairbairn	United Australia
East Sydney	6 February 1932	Death	John Clasby	United Australia	Eddie Ward	Lang Labor
=== 12th Parliament (1929–1931) ===
Division	Date	Cause	Former member	Party	Winner	Party
East Sydney	7 March 1931	Death	John West	Labor	Eddie Ward	Labor
Parkes	31 January 1931	Resignation	Edward McTiernan	Labor	Charles Marr	Nationalist
Franklin	14 December 1929	Death	William McWilliams	Independent	Charles Frost	Labor
=== 11th Parliament (1928–1929) ===
Division	Date	Cause	Former member	Party	Winner	Party
Balaclava	3 August 1929	Resignation	William Watt	Nationalist	Thomas White	Nationalist
=== 10th Parliament (1925–1928) ===
Division	Date	Cause	Former member	Party	Winner	Party
Wide Bay	(3 September 1928)	Death	Edward Corser	Nationalist	Bernard Corser	Country
Martin	16 June 1928	Death	Herbert Pratten	Nationalist	Graham Pratten	Nationalist
Warringah	21 May 1927	Resignation	Granville Ryrie	Nationalist	Archdale Parkhill	Nationalist
Dalley	26 February 1927	Resignation	William Mahony	Labor	Ted Theodore	Labor
Eden-Monaro	6 March 1926	Death	Austin Chapman	Nationalist	John Perkins	Nationalist
=== 9th Parliament (1922–1925) ===
No by-elections held
=== 8th Parliament (1919–1922) ===
Division	Date	Cause	Former member	Party	Winner	Party
Yarra	18 February 1922	Death	Frank Tudor	Labor	James Scullin	Labor
Parramatta	10 December 1921	Resignation	Joseph Cook	Nationalist	Herbert Pratten	Nationalist
West Sydney	3 September 1921	Death	T. J. Ryan	Labor	William Lambert	Labor
Maranoa	30 July 1921	Death	Jim Page	Labor	James Hunter	Country
Kalgoorlie	18 December 1920	Expulsion	Hugh Mahon	Labor	George Foley	Nationalist
Ballaarat	10 July 1920	Disqualification (void election)	Edwin Kerby	Nationalist	Charles McGrath	Labor
=== 7th Parliament (1917–1919) ===
Division	Date	Cause	Former member	Party	Winner	Party
Echuca	20 September 1919	Death	Albert Palmer	Nationalist	William Hill	Victorian Farmers
Corangamite	14 December 1918	Death	Chester Manifold	Nationalist	William Gibson	Victorian Farmers
Swan	26 October 1918	Death	John Forrest	Nationalist	Edwin Corboy	Labor
Flinders	11 May 1918	Resignation	William Irvine	Nationalist	Stanley Bruce	Nationalist
Grampians	27 October 1917	Death	Carty Salmon	Nationalist	Edmund Jowett	Nationalist
Darwin	30 June 1917	Death	Charles Howroyd	Nationalist	William Spence	Nationalist
=== 6th Parliament (1914–1917) ===
Division	Date	Cause	Former member	Party	Winner	Party
Wide Bay	11 December 1915	Resignation	Andrew Fisher	Labor	Edward Corser	Liberal
Dalley	(6 May 1915)	Death	Robert Howe	Labor	William Mahony	Labor
Grampians	20 February 1915	Death	Edward Jolley	Labor	Carty Salmon	Liberal
Bendigo	6 February 1915	Death	John Arthur	Labor	Alfred Hampson	Labor
=== 5th Parliament (1913–1914) ===
Division	Date	Cause	Former member	Party	Winner	Party
Adelaide	10 January 1914	Death	Ernest Roberts	Labor	George Edwin Yates	Labor
Kalgoorlie	22 December 1913	Death	Charlie Frazer	Labor	Hugh Mahon	Labor
=== 4th Parliament (1910–1913) ===
Division	Date	Cause	Former member	Party	Winner	Party
Werriwa	1 June 1912	Resignation	David Hall	Labor	Benjamin Bennett	Labor
Boothby	11 November 1911	Death	Lee Batchelor	Labour	David Gordon	Liberal
North Sydney	11 March 1911	Death	George Edwards	Liberal	Granville Ryrie	Liberal
Batman	8 February 1911	Death	Henry Beard	Labour	Frank Brennan	Labour
Kooyong	24 August 1910	Resignation	William Knox	Liberal	Robert Best	Liberal
=== 3rd Parliament (1906–1910) ===
Division	Date	Cause	Former member	Party	Winner	Party
Wakefield	28 August 1909	Death	Frederick Holder	Independent	Richard Foster	Liberal
Adelaide	13 June 1908	Death	Charles Kingston	Protectionist	Ernest Roberts	Labour
Echuca	10 July 1907	Disqualification (void election)	Albert Palmer	Anti-Socialist	Albert Palmer	Anti-Socialist
=== 2nd Parliament (1903–1906) ===
Division	Date	Cause	Former member	Party	Winner	Party
Riverina	18 May 1904	Disqualification (void election)	Robert Blackwood	Free Trade	John Chanter	Protectionist
Melbourne	30 March 1904	Disqualification (void election)	Malcolm McEacharn	Protectionist	William Maloney	Labour
Wilmot	26 February 1904	Death	Edward Braddon	Free Trade	Norman Cameron	Free Trade
=== 1st Parliament (1901–1903) ===
Division	Date	Cause	Former member	Party	Winner	Party
East Sydney	4 September 1903	Resignation (protest)	George Reid	Free Trade	George Reid	Free Trade
Tasmania	26 March 1902	Death	Frederick Piesse	Free Trade	William Hartnoll	Free Trade
Darling Downs	14 September 1901	Death	William Henry Groom	Protectionist	Littleton Groom	Protectionist

== State by-elections ==
- New South Wales state by-elections
- Northern Territory by-elections
- Queensland state by-elections
- South Australian state by-elections
- Tasmania state by-elections
- Victorian state by-elections
- Western Australian state by-elections

== Sources ==
- Barber, Stephen (8 May 2019). "Appendix 1: House of Representatives by-elections, 1901–2018". House of Representatives by-elections: 1901–2018 (PDF). Parliament Library. pp. 23–26.

== See also ==
- Chronology of Australian federal parliaments
