= Members of the Australian House of Representatives, 1958–1961 =

This is a list of members of the Australian House of Representatives from 1958 to 1961, as elected at the 1958 federal election.

Member	Party	Electorate	State	In office
Charles Adermann	Country	Fisher	Qld	1943–1972
Ian Allan	Country	Gwydir	NSW	1953–1969
Charles Anderson	Country	Hume	NSW	1949–1951, 1955–1961
Doug Anthony	Country	Richmond	NSW	1957–1984
William Aston	Liberal	Phillip	NSW	1955–1961, 1963–1972
Henry Bandidt	Country	Wide Bay	Qld	1958–1961
Lance Barnard	Labor	Bass	Tas	1954–1975
Charles Barnes	Country	McPherson	Qld	1958–1972
Sir Garfield Barwick	Liberal	Parramatta	NSW	1958–1964
Jeff Bate	Liberal	Macarthur	NSW	1949–1972
Noel Beaton ^{[6]}	Labor	Bendigo	Vic	1960–1969
Kim Beazley	Labor	Fremantle	WA	1945–1977
Alan Bird	Labor	Batman	Vic	1949–1962
Francis Bland	Liberal	Warringah	NSW	1951–1961
George Bowden	Country	Gippsland	Vic	1943–1961
Wilfred Brimblecombe	Country	Maranoa	Qld	1951–1966
Peter Browne	Liberal	Kalgoorlie	WA	1958–1961
Gordon Bryant	Labor	Wills	Vic	1955–1980
Alex Buchanan	Liberal	McMillan	Vic	1955–1972
Les Bury	Liberal	Wentworth	NSW	1956–1974
Jim Cairns	Labor	Yarra	Vic	1955–1977
Arthur Calwell	Labor	Melbourne	Vic	1940–1972
Clyde Cameron	Labor	Hindmarsh	SA	1949–1980
Donald Cameron	Liberal	Oxley	Qld	1949–1961
Richard Casey ^{[3]}	Liberal	La Trobe	Vic	1931–1940, 1949–1960
Doug Cash	Liberal	Stirling	WA	1958–1961
Fred Chaney Sr.	Liberal	Perth	WA	1955–1969
Don Chipp ^{[7]}	Liberal	Higinbotham	Vic	1960–1977
Arthur Chresby	Liberal	Griffith	Qld	1958–1961
Percy Clarey ^{[6]}	Labor	Bendigo	Vic	1949–1960
Joe Clark	Labor	Darling	NSW	1934–1969
Lionel Clay	Labor	St George	NSW	1958–1963
Richard Cleaver	Liberal	Swan	WA	1955–1969
Jim Cope	Labor	Watson	NSW	1955–1975
Eric Costa	Labor	Banks	NSW	1949–1969
Frank Courtnay	Labor	Darebin	Vic	1958–1969
John Cramer	Liberal	Bennelong	NSW	1949–1974
Frank Crean	Labor	Melbourne Ports	Vic	1951–1977
Dan Curtin	Labor	Kingsford-Smith	NSW	1949–1969
Fred Daly	Labor	Grayndler	NSW	1943–1975
Charles Davidson	Country	Dawson	Qld	1946–1963
Ron Davies	Labor	Braddon	Tas	1958–1975
Frank Davis	Liberal	Deakin	Vic	1949–1966
Roger Dean	Liberal	Robertson	NSW	1949–1964
Alick Downer	Liberal	Angas	SA	1949–1964
David Drummond	Country	New England	NSW	1949–1963
Nigel Drury	Liberal	Ryan	Qld	1949–1975
Gil Duthie	Labor	Wilmot	Tas	1946–1975
John England ^{[5]}	Country	Calare	NSW	1960–1975
Dudley Erwin	Liberal	Ballaarat	Vic	1955–1975
H.V. Evatt ^{[2]}	Labor	Hunter	NSW	1940–1960
Laurie Failes	Country	Lawson	NSW	1949–1969
David Fairbairn	Liberal	Farrer	NSW	1949–1975
Allen Fairhall	Liberal	Paterson	NSW	1949–1969
Bill Falkinder	Liberal	Franklin	Tas	1946–1966
Jim Forbes	Liberal	Barker	SA	1956–1975
Max Fox	Liberal	Henty	Vic	1955–1974
Allan Fraser	Labor	Eden-Monaro	NSW	1943–1966, 1969–1972
Jim Fraser ^{[1]}	Labor	Australian Capital Territory	ACT	1951–1970
Malcolm Fraser	Liberal	Wannon	Vic	1955–1983
Gordon Freeth	Liberal	Forrest	WA	1949–1969
Bill Fulton	Labor	Leichhardt	Qld	1958–1975
Pat Galvin	Labor	Kingston	SA	1951–1966
Charles Griffiths	Labor	Shortland	NSW	1949–1972
Hugh Halbert	Liberal	Moore	WA	1958–1961
Len Hamilton	Country	Canning	WA	1946–1961
Eli Harrison	Labor	Blaxland	NSW	1949–1969
Paul Hasluck	Liberal	Curtin	WA	1949–1969
William Haworth	Liberal	Isaacs	Vic	1949–1969
Les Haylen	Labor	Parkes	NSW	1943–1963
Harold Holt	Liberal	Higgins	Vic	1935–1967
Mac Holten	Country	Indi	Vic	1958–1977
John Howse ^{[5]}	Liberal	Calare	NSW	1946–1960
Peter Howson	Liberal	Fawkner	Vic	1955–1972
Alan Hulme	Liberal	Petrie	Qld	1949–1961, 1963–1972
William Jack	Liberal	North Sydney	NSW	1949–1966
Bert James ^{[2]}	Labor	Hunter	NSW	1960–1980
John Jess ^{[3]}	Liberal	La Trobe	Vic	1960–1972
Les Johnson	Labor	Hughes	NSW	1955–1966, 1969–1984
Charles Jones	Labor	Newcastle	NSW	1958–1983
Percy Joske ^{[4]}	Liberal	Balaclava	Vic	1951–1960
Victor Kearney	Labor	Cunningham	NSW	1956–1963
Bert Kelly	Liberal	Wakefield	SA	1958–1977
Wilfrid Kent Hughes	Liberal	Chisholm	Vic	1949–1970
James Killen	Liberal	Moreton	Qld	1955–1983
Robert King	Country	Wimmera	Vic	1958–1977
George Lawson	Labor	Brisbane	Qld	1931–1961
Robert Lindsay	Liberal	Flinders	Vic	1954–1966
Tony Luchetti	Labor	Macquarie	NSW	1951–1975
Philip Lucock	Country	Lyne	NSW	1952–1980
Dan Mackinnon	Liberal	Corangamite	Vic	1949–1951, 1953–1966
Norman Makin	Labor	Bonython	SA	1919–1946, 1954–1963
Malcolm McColm	Liberal	Bowman	Qld	1949–1961
John McEwen	Country	Murray	Vic	1934–1971
Hector McIvor	Labor	Gellibrand	Vic	1955–1972
John McLeay Sr.	Liberal	Boothby	SA	1949–1966
William McMahon	Liberal	Lowe	NSW	1949–1982
Robert Menzies	Liberal	Kooyong	Vic	1934–1966
Dan Minogue	Labor	West Sydney	NSW	1949–1969
John Murray	Liberal	Herbert	Qld	1958–1961
Jock Nelson ^{[1]}	Labor	Northern Territory	NT	1949–1966
William O'Connor	Labor	Dalley	NSW	1946–1969
Hubert Opperman	Liberal	Corio	Vic	1949–1967
Frederick Osborne	Liberal	Evans	NSW	1949–1961
Sir Earle Page	Country	Cowper	NSW	1919–1961
Henry Pearce	Liberal	Capricornia	Qld	1949–1961
Ted Peters	Labor	Scullin	Vic	1949–1969
Reg Pollard	Labor	Lalor	Vic	1937–1966
Len Reynolds	Labor	Barton	NSW	1958–1966, 1969–1975
Bill Riordan	Labor	Kennedy	Qld	1936–1966
Hugh Roberton	Country	Riverina	NSW	1949–1965
Edgar Russell	Labor	Grey	SA	1943–1963
Joe Sexton	Labor	Adelaide	SA	1958–1966
Billy Snedden	Liberal	Bruce	Vic	1955–1983
Frank Stewart	Labor	Lang	NSW	1953–1979
Philip Stokes	Liberal	Maribyrnong	Vic	1955–1969
Reginald Swartz	Liberal	Darling Downs	Qld	1949–1972
Albert Thompson	Labor	Port Adelaide	SA	1946–1963
Frank Timson ^{[7]}	Liberal	Higinbotham	Vic	1949–1960
Athol Townley	Liberal	Denison	Tas	1949–1964
Winton Turnbull	Country	Mallee	Vic	1946–1972
Harry Turner	Liberal	Bradfield	NSW	1952–1974
Tom Uren	Labor	Reid	NSW	1958–1990
Eddie Ward	Labor	East Sydney	NSW	1931, 1932–1963
Bill Wentworth	Liberal	Mackellar	NSW	1949–1977
Roy Wheeler	Liberal	Mitchell	NSW	1949–1961
Gough Whitlam	Labor	Werriwa	NSW	1952–1978
Ray Whittorn ^{[4]}	Liberal	Balaclava	Vic	1960–1974
Bruce Wight	Liberal	Lilley	Qld	1949–1961
Keith Wilson	Liberal	Sturt	SA	1937–1944 (S), 1949–1954, 1955–1966

^{1} At this time, the members for the Northern Territory and Australian Capital Territory could only vote on matters relating to their respective territories.
^{2} The Labor member for Hunter, H.V. Evatt, resigned on 10 February 1960; Labor candidate Bert James won the resulting by-election on 9 April.
^{3} The Liberal member for La Trobe, Richard Casey, resigned on 10 February 1960; Liberal candidate John Jess won the resulting by-election on 9 April.
^{4} The Liberal member for Balaclava, Percy Joske, resigned on 2 June 1960; Liberal candidate Ray Whittorn won the resulting by-election on 16 July.
^{5} The Liberal member for Calare, John Howse, resigned on 28 September 1960; Country Party candidate John England won the resulting by-election on 5 November.
^{6} The Labor member for Bendigo, Percy Clarey, died on 17 May 1960; Labor candidate Noel Beaton won the resulting by-election on 16 July.
^{7} The Liberal member for Higinbotham, Frank Timson, died on 16 October 1960; Liberal candidate Don Chipp won the resulting by-election on 10 November.
