= Electoral results for the Division of Balaclava =

Australian division election results

This is a list of electoral results for the Division of Balaclava in Australian federal elections from the division's creation in 1901 until its abolition in 1984.

== Members ==
Member	Party	Term
Sir George Turner	Protectionist	1901–1906
Agar Wynne	Ind. Protectionist	1906–1909
Agar Wynne	Liberal	1909–1914
William Watt	Liberal	1914–1917
William Watt	Nationalist	1917–1922
William Watt	Liberal Union	1922–1925
William Watt	Nationalist	1925–1929
Thomas White	Nationalist	1929–1931
Thomas White	United Australia	1931–1945
Thomas White	Liberal	1945–1951
Percy Joske	Liberal	1951–1960
Ray Whittorn	Liberal	1960–1974
Ian Macphee	Liberal	1974–1984

== Election results ==
=== Elections in the 1980s ===
==== 1983 ====
1983 Australian federal election: Balaclava
Party	Candidate	Votes	%	±%
Liberal	Ian Macphee	31,642	50.1	−1.5
Labor	Chris Kennedy	25,867	41.0	+4.8
Democrats	Zelma Furey	5,004	7.9	−4.3
Conservative Nationalist	Timothy Warner	600	1.0	+1.0
Total formal votes		63,113	98.1	
Informal votes		1,218	1.9	
Turnout		64,331	95.0	
Two-party-preferred result
Liberal	Ian Macphee		53.4	−2.7
Labor	Chris Kennedy		46.6	+2.7
Liberal hold		Swing	−2.7	

==== 1980 ====
1980 Australian federal election: Balaclava
Party	Candidate	Votes	%	±%
Liberal	Ian Macphee	32,729	51.6	+1.0
Labor	Chris Kennedy	22,933	36.2	+7.2
Democrats	Zelma Furey	7,743	12.2	−3.2
Total formal votes		63,405	97.8	
Informal votes		1,444	2.2	
Turnout		64,849	93.8	
Two-party-preferred result
Liberal	Ian Macphee		56.1	−7.2
Labor	Chris Kennedy		43.9	+7.2
Liberal hold		Swing	−7.2	

=== Elections in the 1970s ===
==== 1977 ====
1977 Australian federal election: Balaclava
Party	Candidate	Votes	%	±%
Liberal	Ian Macphee	33,304	50.6	−7.0
Labor	Robert Steele	19,065	29.0	−5.1
Democrats	Zelma Furey	10,129	15.4	+15.4
Democratic Labor	Peter Lawlor	3,321	5.0	+1.0
Total formal votes		65,819	97.4	
Informal votes		1,774	2.6	
Turnout		67,593	94.6	
Two-party-preferred result
Liberal	Ian Macphee		63.3	+0.8
Labor	Robert Steele		36.7	−0.8
Liberal hold		Swing	+0.8	

==== 1975 ====
1975 Australian federal election: Balaclava
Party	Candidate	Votes	%	±%
Liberal	Ian Macphee	32,581	58.8	+7.4
Labor	Martin Ryan	18,203	32.9	−8.4
Australia	John Howe	2,375	4.3	+1.6
Democratic Labor	Peter Lawlor	2,214	4.0	−0.7
Total formal votes		55,373	98.0	
Informal votes		1,122	2.0	
Turnout		56,495	95.1	
Two-party-preferred result
Liberal	Ian Macphee		63.7	+7.0
Labor	Martin Ryan		36.3	−7.0
Liberal hold		Swing	+7.0	

==== 1974 ====
1974 Australian federal election: Balaclava
Party	Candidate	Votes	%	±%
Liberal	Ian Macphee	28,313	51.4	+4.8
Labor	Irene Dunsmuir	22,755	41.3	−3.2
Democratic Labor	Peter Lawlor	2,569	4.7	−2.6
Australia	Michael Muschamp	1,465	2.7	+2.7
Total formal votes		55,102	97.9	
Informal votes		1,186	2.1	
Turnout		56,288	95.2	
Two-party-preferred result
Liberal	Ian Macphee		56.7	+2.9
Labor	Irene Dunsmuir		43.3	−2.9
Liberal hold		Swing	+2.9	

==== 1972 ====
1972 Australian federal election: Balaclava
Party	Candidate	Votes	%	±%
Liberal	Ray Whittorn	24,455	46.6	−5.1
Labor	Irene Dunsmuir	23,365	44.5	+8.0
Democratic Labor	Ralph James	3,809	7.3	−1.8
Independent	Leslie Rubinstein	857	1.6	+1.6
Total formal votes		52,486	97.7	
Informal votes		1,234	2.3	
Turnout		53,720	95.0	
Two-party-preferred result
Liberal	Ray Whittorn	28,218	53.8	−7.1
Labor	Irene Dunsmuir	24,268	46.2	+7.1
Liberal hold		Swing	−7.1	

=== Elections in the 1960s ===
==== 1969 ====
1969 Australian federal election: Balaclava
Party	Candidate	Votes	%	±%
Liberal	Ray Whittorn	26,852	51.7	−3.8
Labor	Irene Dunsmuir	18,949	36.5	+13.3
Democratic Labor	Ralph James	4,751	9.1	−5.1
Australia	Steven Soos	1,398	2.7	+2.7
Total formal votes		51,950	97.1	
Informal votes		1,571	2.9	
Turnout		53,521	94.4	
Two-party-preferred result
Liberal	Ray Whittorn		60.9	−8.3
Labor	Irene Dunsmuir		39.1	+8.3
Liberal hold		Swing	−8.3	

==== 1966 ====
1966 Australian federal election: Balaclava
Party	Candidate	Votes	%	±%
Liberal	Ray Whittorn	21,131	54.0	−4.8
Labor	Leo Richards	9,668	24.7	−4.9
Democratic Labor	Ralph James	5,552	14.2	+3.8
Liberal Reform Group	Brian McLure	2,762	7.1	+7.1
Total formal votes		39,113	96.9	
Informal votes		1,258	3.1	
Turnout		40,371	94.7	
Two-party-preferred result
Liberal	Ray Whittorn		67.7	−1.1
Labor	Leo Richards		32.3	+1.1
Liberal hold		Swing	−1.1	

==== 1963 ====
1963 Australian federal election: Balaclava
Party	Candidate	Votes	%	±%
Liberal	Ray Whittorn	23,487	58.8	+6.9
Labor	Ephraim Briskman	11,802	29.6	−0.5
Democratic Labor	John Ryan	4,135	10.4	−3.1
Independent	Edith Jewell	491	1.2	+1.2
Total formal votes		39,915	98.8	
Informal votes		485	1.2	
Turnout		43,381	97.2	
Two-party-preferred result
Liberal	Ray Whittorn		68.8	+3.0
Labor	Ephraim Briskman		31.2	−3.0
Liberal hold		Swing	+3.0	

==== 1961 ====
1961 Australian federal election: Balaclava
Party	Candidate	Votes	%	±%
Liberal	Ray Whittorn	20,517	51.9	−9.2
Labor	Ernst Platz	11,892	30.1	+4.8
Democratic Labor	John Ryan	5,333	13.5	+1.5
Republican	John Murray	1,780	4.5	+4.5
Total formal votes		39,522	97.8	
Informal votes		888	2.2	
Turnout		40,410	95.7	
Two-party-preferred result
Liberal	Ray Whittorn		65.8	−6.9
Labor	Ernst Platz		34.2	+6.9
Liberal hold		Swing	−6.9	

==== 1960 by-election ====
Balaclava by-election, 1960
Party	Candidate	Votes	%	±%
Liberal	Ray Whittorn	17,859	54.3	−6.8
Labor	George Smith	9,519	28.9	+3.6
Democratic Labor	John Ryan	4,672	14.2	+2.2
Republican	John Murray	865	2.6	+2.6
Total formal votes		32,915	97.9	
Informal votes		694	2.1	
Turnout		33,609	79.5	
Two-party-preferred result
Liberal	Ray Whittorn		66.5	−5.0
Labor	George Smith		33.5	+5.0
Liberal hold		Swing	−5.0	

=== Elections in the 1950s ===
==== 1958 ====
1958 Australian federal election: Balaclava
Party	Candidate	Votes	%	±%
Liberal	Percy Joske	24,722	61.1	−3.0
Labor	Norman Rothfield	10,232	25.3	+1.3
Democratic Labor	Rex Keane	4,852	12.0	+0.2
Independent	Grace Stratton	626	1.5	+1.5
Total formal votes		40,432	97.7	
Informal votes		965	2.3	
Turnout		41,397	95.8	
Two-party-preferred result
Liberal	Percy Joske		72.7	−0.8
Labor	Norman Rothfield		27.3	+0.8
Liberal hold		Swing	−0.8	

==== 1955 ====
1955 Australian federal election: Balaclava
Party	Candidate	Votes	%	±%
Liberal	Percy Joske	26,087	64.1	+0.7
Labor	George Smith	9,780	24.0	−12.6
Labor (A-C)	Rex Keane	4,816	11.8	+11.8
Total formal votes		40,683	97.8	
Informal votes		896	2.2	
Turnout		41,579	94.0	
Two-party-preferred result
Liberal	Percy Joske		73.5	+10.1
Labor	George Smith		26.5	−10.1
Liberal hold		Swing	+10.1	

==== 1954 ====
1954 Australian federal election: Balaclava
Party	Candidate	Votes	%	±%
Liberal	Percy Joske	25,062	65.2	+1.9
Labor	Leonard Prior	13,365	34.8	−1.9
Total formal votes		38,427	99.1	
Informal votes		364	0.9	
Turnout		38,791	96.2	
Liberal hold		Swing	+1.9	

==== 1951 by-election ====
Balaclava by-election, 1951
Party	Candidate	Votes	%	±%
Liberal	Percy Joske	20,337	57.0	−6.3
Labor	Arthur Lewis	13,279	37.2	+0.5
Independent	Grace Stratton	2,035	5.7	+5.7
Total formal votes		35,651	99.2	
Informal votes		274	0.8	
Turnout		35,925	83.9	
Two-party-preferred result
Liberal	Percy Joske		59.9	−3.4
Labor	Arthur Lewis		40.1	+3.4
Liberal hold		Swing	−3.4	

==== 1951 ====
1951 Australian federal election: Balaclava
Party	Candidate	Votes	%	±%
Liberal	Thomas White	25,578	63.3	−0.6
Labor	Arthur Lewis	14,845	36.7	+0.6
Total formal votes		40,423	98.7	
Informal votes		525	1.3	
Turnout		40,948	96.1	
Liberal hold		Swing	−0.6	

=== Elections in the 1940s ===
==== 1949 ====
1949 Australian federal election: Balaclava
Party	Candidate	Votes	%	±%
Liberal	Thomas White	26,157	63.9	+4.8
Labor	Martin Dunne	14,796	36.1	−4.8
Total formal votes		40,953	98.8	
Informal votes		512	1.2	
Turnout		41,465	96.3	
Liberal hold		Swing	+4.8	

==== 1946 ====
1946 Australian federal election: Balaclava
Party	Candidate	Votes	%	±%
Liberal	Thomas White	45,137	58.4	+6.8
Labor	Maurice Ashkanasy	32,087	41.6	+5.3
Total formal votes		77,224	98.3	
Informal votes		1,348	1.7	
Turnout		78,572	93.4	
Liberal hold		Swing	+1.8	

==== 1943 ====
1943 Australian federal election: Balaclava
Party	Candidate	Votes	%	±%
United Australia	Thomas White	38,698	51.6	−12.4
Labor	John Barry	27,281	36.3	+11.3
Independent	Frank Barnes	4,087	5.4	+5.4
Independent	Constance Duncan	2,900	3.9	+3.9
Progressive	Helen Maxwell	1,680	2.2	+2.2
Independent	George Morris	409	0.5	+0.5
Total formal votes		75,055	96.2	
Informal votes		3,964	3.8	
Turnout		78,019	98.4	
Two-party-preferred result
United Australia	Thomas White		56.6	−12.0
Labor	John Barry		43.4	+12.0
United Australia hold		Swing	−12.0	

==== 1940 ====
1940 Australian federal election: Balaclava
Party	Candidate	Votes	%	±%
United Australia	Thomas White	43,876	64.0	+5.9
Labor	Charles Sandford	17,135	25.0	+3.2
Independent	Harry Moffat	7,586	11.1	+11.1
Total formal votes		68,597	98.5	
Informal votes		1,047	1.5	
Turnout		69,644	95.0	
Two-party-preferred result
United Australia	Thomas White		68.6	+1.5
Labor	Charles Sandford		31.4	−1.5
United Australia hold		Swing	+1.5	

=== Elections in the 1930s ===
==== 1937 ====
1937 Australian federal election: Balaclava
Party	Candidate	Votes	%	±%
United Australia	Thomas White	36,602	58.1	−13.7
Labor	Phillip Nash	13,746	21.8	−2.0
Independent	John Atkinson	12,613	20.0	+20.0
Total formal votes		62,961	97.9	
Informal votes		1,321	2.1	
Turnout		64,282	96.5	
Two-party-preferred result
United Australia	Thomas White		67.1	−6.9
Labor	Phillip Nash		32.9	+6.9
United Australia hold		Swing	−6.9	

==== 1934 ====
1934 Australian federal election: Balaclava
Party	Candidate	Votes	%	±%
United Australia	Thomas White	41,017	72.9	−2.7
Labor	Michael Nolan	15,248	27.1	+6.5
Total formal votes		56,265	96.9	
Informal votes		1,788	3.1	
Turnout		58,053	95.0	
United Australia hold		Swing	−3.6	

==== 1931 ====
1931 Australian federal election: Balaclava
Party	Candidate	Votes	%	±%
United Australia	Thomas White	41,703	75.5	+17.0
Labor	Edward Stewart	11,409	20.6	−20.9
Independent	James Denyer	2,147	3.9	+3.9
Total formal votes		55,259	97.9	
Informal votes		1,187	2.1	
Turnout		56,446	97.1	
Two-party-preferred result
United Australia	Thomas White		76.5	+18.0
Labor	Edward Stewart		23.5	−18.0
United Australia hold		Swing	+18.0	

=== Elections in the 1920s ===
==== 1929 ====
1929 Australian federal election: Balaclava
Party	Candidate	Votes	%	±%
Nationalist	Thomas White	31,751	58.5	−4.7
Labor	Don Cameron	22,480	41.5	+41.5
Total formal votes		54,231	95.6	
Informal votes		2,404	4.4	
Turnout		56,635	97.7	
Nationalist hold		Swing	−4.7	

==== 1929 by-election ====
Balaclava by-election, 1929
Party	Candidate	Votes	%	±%
Nationalist	Thomas White	28,655	64.1	−0.9
Ind. Nationalist	Frederick Francis	16,048	35.9	+35.9
Total formal votes		44,703	98.3	
Informal votes		769	1.7	
Turnout		45,472	82.5	
Nationalist hold		Swing	+0.9	

==== 1928 ====
1928 Australian federal election: Balaclava
Party	Candidate	Votes	%	±%
Nationalist	William Watt	31,977	63.2	−6.5
Ind. Nationalist	Edward Price	18,651	36.8	+36.8
Total formal votes		50,628	94.7	
Informal votes		2,850	5.3	
Turnout		53,478	95.1	
Nationalist hold		Swing	−6.5	

==== 1925 ====
1925 Australian federal election: Balaclava
Party	Candidate	Votes	%	±%
Nationalist	William Watt	35,458	69.7	−30.3
Labor	John McKellar	15,379	30.3	+30.3
Total formal votes		50,837	98.7	
Informal votes		654	1.3	
Turnout		51,491	95.3	
Nationalist gain from Liberal		Swing	−30.3	

==== 1922 ====
1922 Australian federal election: Balaclava
Party	Candidate	Votes	%	±%
Liberal	William Watt	unopposed		
Liberal gain from Nationalist		Swing		

=== Elections in the 1910s ===
==== 1919 ====
1919 Australian federal election: Balaclava
Party	Candidate	Votes	%	±%
Nationalist	William Watt	19,051	58.2	−8.4
Labor	Percy Smith	9,311	28.4	−5.0
Returned Services	Norman Worrall	4,388	13.4	+13.4
Total formal votes		32,750	95.7	
Informal votes		1,457	4.3	
Turnout		34,207	73.4	
Two-party-preferred result
Nationalist	William Watt		64.9	−1.7
Labor	Percy Smith		35.1	+1.7
Nationalist hold		Swing	−1.7	

==== 1917 ====
1917 Australian federal election: Balaclava
Party	Candidate	Votes	%	±%
Nationalist	William Watt	23,308	66.6	+8.2
Labor	Alfred Foster	11,690	33.4	−8.2
Total formal votes		34,998	97.6	
Informal votes		848	2.4	
Turnout		35,846	84.0	
Nationalist hold		Swing	+8.2	

==== 1914 ====
1914 Australian federal election: Balaclava
Party	Candidate	Votes	%	±%
Liberal	William Watt	17,607	58.4	−6.6
Labor	John Curtin	12,526	41.6	+6.6
Total formal votes		30,133	97.7	
Informal votes		719	2.3	
Turnout		30,852	78.5	
Liberal hold		Swing	−6.6	

==== 1913 ====
1913 Australian federal election: Balaclava
Party	Candidate	Votes	%	±%
Liberal	Agar Wynne	18,369	65.0	+0.4
Labor	Louis Holmes	9,895	35.0	−0.4
Total formal votes		28,264	98.0	
Informal votes		571	2.0	
Turnout		28,835	72.3	
Liberal hold		Swing	+0.4	

==== 1910 ====
1910 Australian federal election: Balaclava
Party	Candidate	Votes	%	±%
Liberal	Agar Wynne	12,432	62.0	−18.4
Labour	George Mead	7,615	38.0	+18.4
Total formal votes		20,047	98.2	
Informal votes		358	1.8	
Turnout		20,405	57.7	
Liberal hold		Swing	18.4	

=== Elections in the 1900s ===
==== 1906 ====
1906 Australian federal election: Balaclava
Party	Candidate	Votes	%	±%
Ind. Protectionist	Agar Wynne	6,957	41.8	+41.8
Ind. Anti-Socialist	Joseph Hewison	5,651	33.9	+33.9
Labour	Alfred Hampson	3,263	19.6	+19.6
Protectionist	Edward Elliott Roberts	786	4.7	−95.3
Total formal votes		16,657	97.5	
Informal votes		431	2.5	
Turnout		17,088	54.0	
Ind. Protectionist gain from Protectionist		Swing	+41.8	

==== 1903 ====
1903 Australian federal election: Balaclava
Party	Candidate	Votes	%	±%
Protectionist	Sir George Turner	unopposed		
Protectionist hold		Swing		

==== 1901 ====
1901 Australian federal election: Balaclava
Party	Candidate	Votes	%	±%
Protectionist	Sir George Turner	unopposed		
Protectionist win		(new seat)		
