= 1969 Gwydir by-election =

Australian federal by-election in New South Wales

- 7 June 1969

The Gwydir seat in the House of Representatives
- Turnout: 39,800 (88.2%)
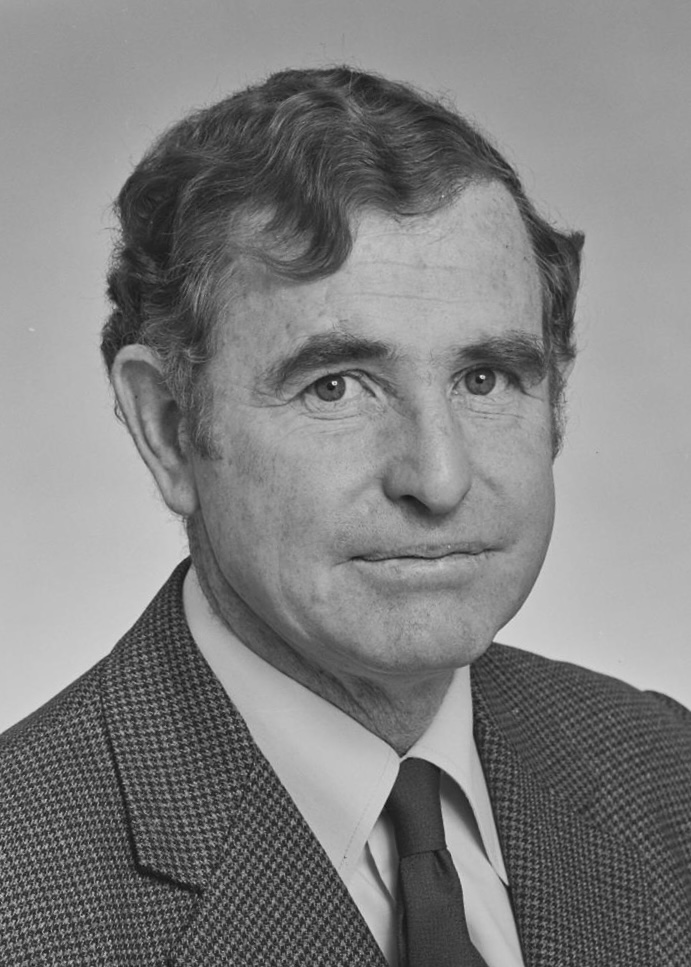

| | First party | Second party |
|---|---|---|
| Candidate | Ralph Hunt | Roger Nott |
| Party | Country | Labor |
| Popular vote | 21,113 | 18,293 |
| Percentage | 53.6% | 46.4% |
| Swing | ▼7.7 | ▲7.7 |
MP before election
Ian Allan
National
Elected MP
Ralph Hunt
National

A by-election was held for the Australian House of Representatives seat of Gwydir on 7 June 1969. This was triggered by the resignation of Country Party MP Ian Allan, who had been appointed Secretary-General and regional director of ANZAC war graves in the Pacific Region of the Commonwealth War Graves Commission. As a by-election for the seat of Bendigo had just been called, the two were held on the same day.

The by-election was won by Country Party candidate Ralph Hunt. This remains the most recent federal by-election to be contested by only two candidates.

== Candidates ==
The Country Party candidate, Ralph Hunt, was the NSW and federal chairman of the party, and a farmer and grazier from northern New South Wales.

The Labor candidate, Roger Nott, was a member of the New South Wales Legislative Assembly for Liverpool Plains, largely located within Gwydir, from 1941 until 1961, and served as a minister in the Cahill and Heffron governments, before being appointed by the Menzies government as Administrator of the Northern Territory.

== Key dates ==
| Date | Event |
|---|---|
| 30 April 1969 | The Speaker announced that Ian Allan had resigned from Parliament. |
| 1 May 1969 | The writ for the by-election was issued. |
| 16 May 1969 | Close of nominations. |
| 7 June 1969 | Polling day. |
| 4 July 1969 | Return of the writ. |
| 12 August 1969 | Ralph Hunt was sworn in as the member for Gwydir. |

== Results ==
Gwydir by-election, 1969
| Party | Candidate | Votes | % | ±% |
|---|---|---|---|---|
| Country | Ralph Hunt | 21,113 | 53.6 | −7.7 |
| Labor | Roger Nott | 18,293 | 46.4 | +7.7 |
| Total formal votes | | 39,406 | 99.0 | |
| Informal votes | | 394 | 1.0 | |
| Turnout | | 39,800 | 88.2 | |
| Country hold | | Swing | −7.7 | |
