= 1929 Balaclava by-election =

Australian House of Representatives by-election

- 3 August 1929
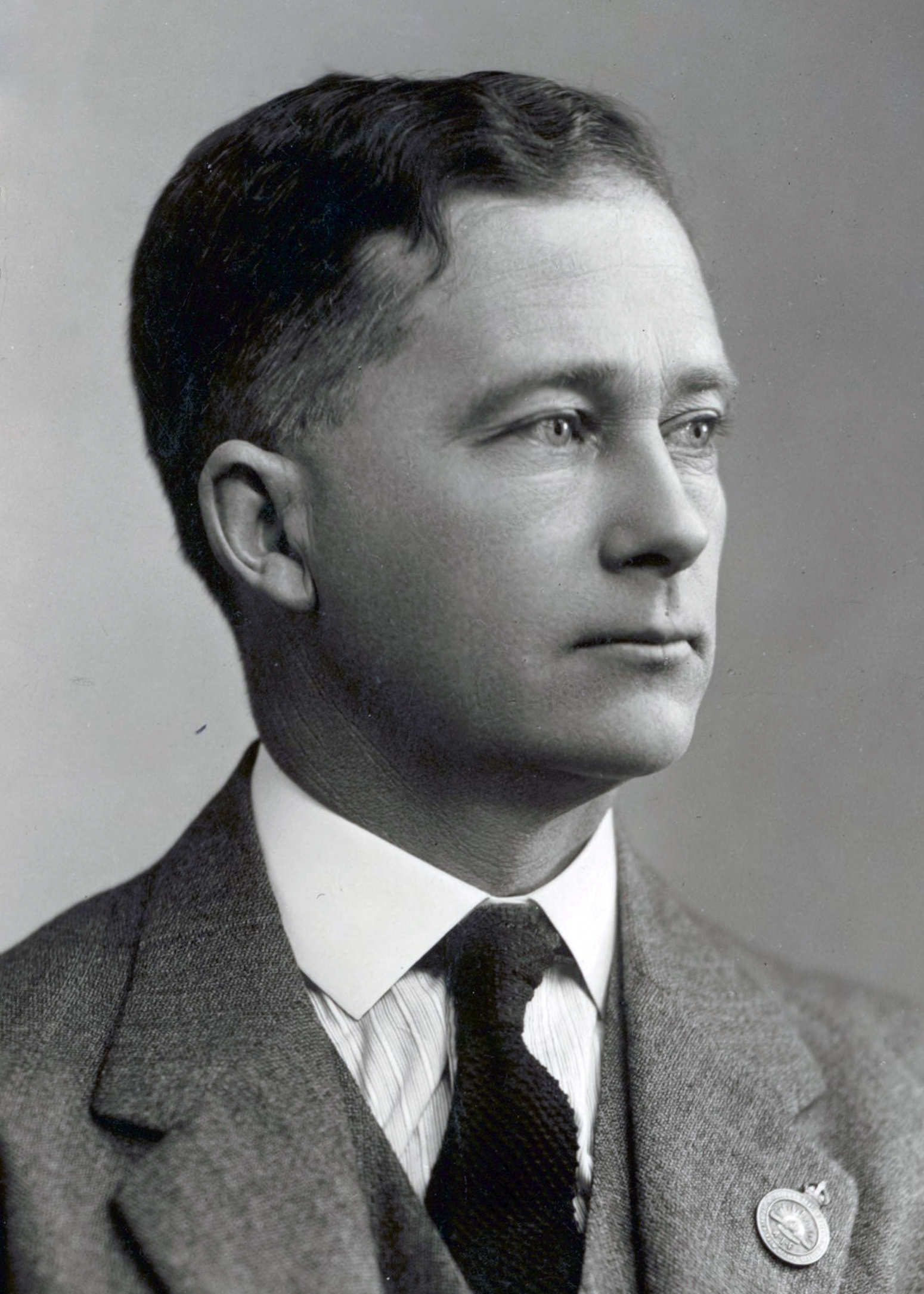

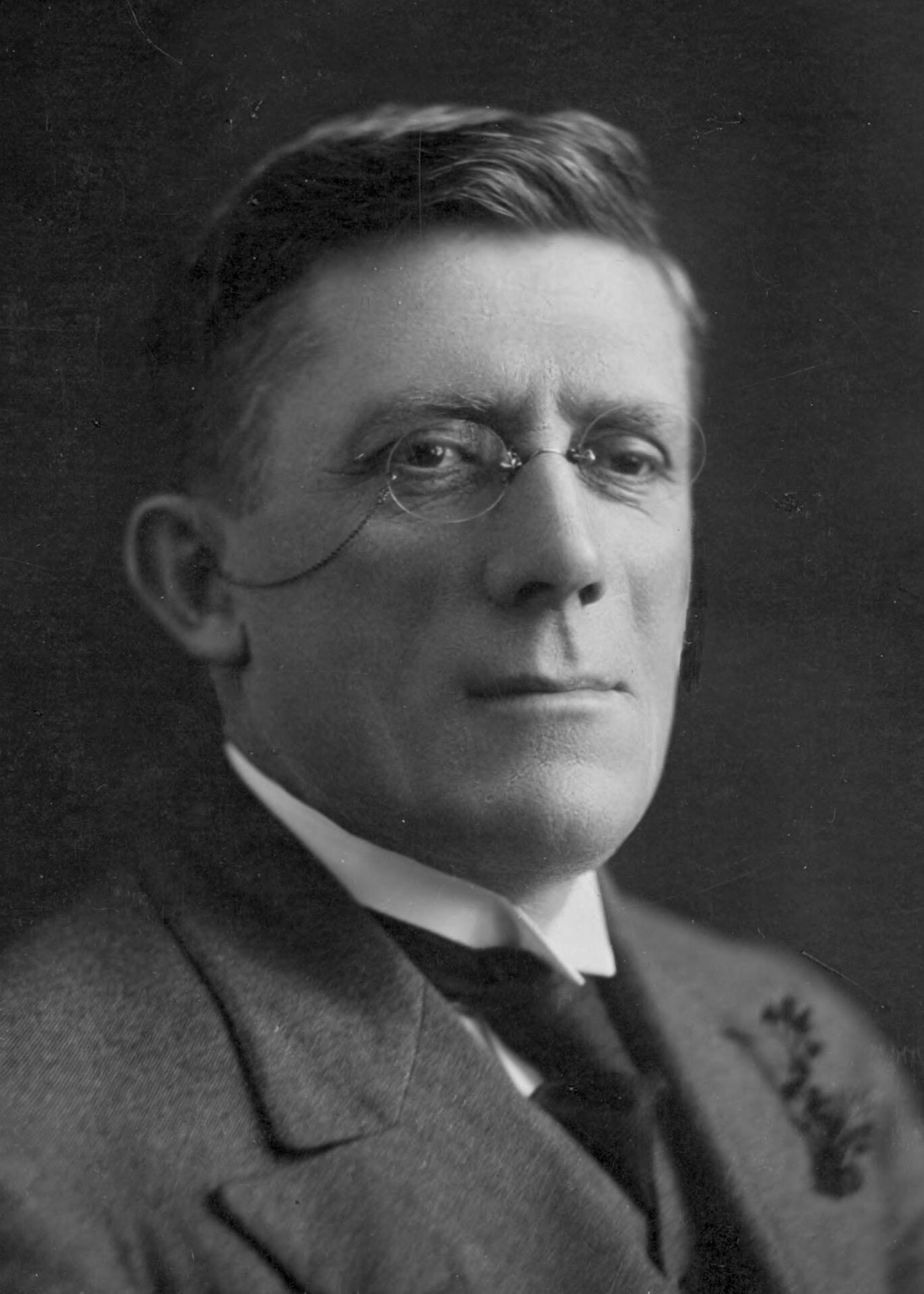
	First party	Second party
Candidate	Thomas White	Frederick Francis
Party	Nationalist	Independent Nationalist
Popular vote	28,655	16,048
Percentage	64.1%	35.9%
Swing	▼0.9pp	▲35.9pp
MP before election
William Watt
Nationalist
Elected MP
Thomas White
Nationalist

A by-election occurred for the Australian House of Representatives seat of Balaclava on 3 August 1929. This was triggered by the resignation of Nationalist MP and former Speaker William Watt.

The by-election was won by Nationalist candidate Thomas White.

== Results ==
Balaclava by-election, 1929
Party	Candidate	Votes	%	±%
Nationalist	Thomas White	28,655	64.1	−0.9
Ind. Nationalist	Frederick Francis	16,048	35.9	+35.9
Total formal votes		44,703	98.3	
Informal votes		769	1.7	
Turnout		45,472	82.5	
Nationalist hold		Swing	+0.9	
