= 1951 Balaclava by-election =

28 July 1951
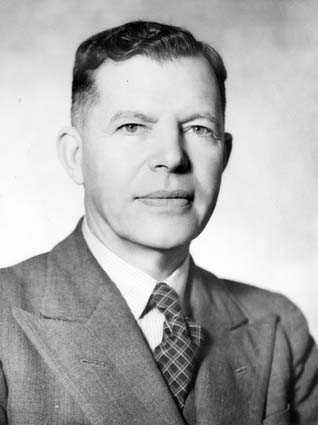

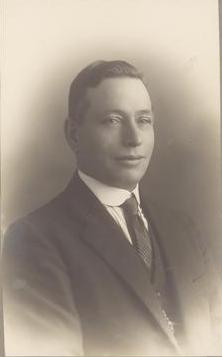
	First party	Second party
Candidate	Percy Joske	Arthur Lewis
Party	Liberal	Labor
Popular vote	20,337	13,279
Percentage	57.0%	37.2%
Swing	▼6.3pp	▲0.5pp
TPP	59.9%	40.1%
TPP Swing	▼3.4pp	▲3.4pp
MP before election
Thomas White
Liberal
Elected MP
Percy Joske
Liberal

A by-election was held for the Australian House of Representatives seat of Balaclava on 28 July 1951. This was triggered by the resignation of Liberal MP Thomas White, the Air and Civil Aviation Minister, to become Australian High Commissioner to the United Kingdom. A by-election for the seat of Macquarie was held on the same day.

The by-election was won by Liberal candidate Percy Joske.

== Results ==
Balaclava by-election, 1951
Party	Candidate	Votes	%	±%
Liberal	Percy Joske	20,337	57.0	−6.3
Labor	Arthur Lewis	13,279	37.2	+0.5
Independent	Grace Stratton	2,035	5.7	+5.7
Total formal votes		35,651	99.2	
Informal votes		274	0.8	
Turnout		35,925	83.9	
Two-party-preferred result
Liberal	Percy Joske		59.9	−3.4
Labor	Arthur Lewis		40.1	+3.4
Liberal hold		Swing	−3.4	
