= 1969 Bendigo by-election =

A by-election was held for the Australian House of Representatives seat of Bendigo on 7 June 1969. This was triggered by the resignation of Labor MP Noel Beaton. A by-election for the seat of Gwydir was held on the same day.

The by-election was won by Labor candidate David Kennedy.

== Key dates ==
Date	Event
9 April 1969	Noel Beaton resigned from Parliament.
30 April 1969	The writ for the by-election was issued.
16 May 1969	Close of nominations.
7 June 1969	Polling day.
4 July 1969	Return of the writ.
12 August 1969	David Kennedy was sworn in as the member for Bendigo.

== Results ==
Bendigo by-election, 1969
Party	Candidate	Votes	%	±%
Labor	David Kennedy	20,011	45.3	−6.4
Liberal	Rodney Cambridge	15,106	34.2	−1.6
Democratic Labor	Paul Brennan	5,710	12.9	+0.3
Independent	Lance Hutchinson	2,750	6.2	+6.2
Independent	Chris Candler	595	1.3	+1.3
Total formal votes		44,172	98.5	
Informal votes		693	1.5	
Turnout		44,865	93.6	
Two-party-preferred result
Labor	David Kennedy	22,421	50.8	−2.2
Liberal	Rodney Cambridge	21,751	49.2	+2.2
Labor hold		Swing	−2.2	
