= 1960 Balaclava by-election =

Australian federal by-election

A by-election was held for the Australian House of Representatives seat of Balaclava on 16 July 1960. This was triggered by the resignation of Liberal MP Percy Joske. A by-election for the seat of Bendigo was held on the same day.

The by-election was won by Liberal candidate Ray Whittorn.

== Results ==
Balaclava by-election, 1960
Party	Candidate	Votes	%	±%
Liberal	Ray Whittorn	17,859	54.3	−6.8
Labor	George Smith	9,519	28.9	+3.6
Democratic Labor	John Ryan	4,672	14.2	+2.2
Republican	John Murray	865	2.6	+2.6
Total formal votes		32,915	97.9	
Informal votes		694	2.1	
Turnout		33,609	79.5	
Two-party-preferred result
Liberal	Ray Whittorn		66.5	−5.0
Labor	George Smith		33.5	+5.0
Liberal hold		Swing	−5.0	
