= Australian Country Party (disambiguation) =

Australian Country Party, is a political party established in 1920, renamed to the National Country Party in 1975, then the National Party of Australia in 1985.

Australian Country Party, Country Party of Australia or simply Country Party may refer to:

- Australian Federation Party, registered as the Australian Country Party from 2015 to 2020
- Country Party (South Australia), formed out of the Farmers and Settlers Association in September 1917 and merged into the Liberal and Country League (LCL) in 1932
  - Country Party of Western Australia, founded in 1913 and now the National Party of Western Australia
- CountryMinded, registered as Country Party of Australia from foundation in December 2014 until September 2015
- Country Party Queensland existed for a few months in 1999–2000
- Liberal and Country League, the major conservative party in South Australia from 1932 to 1974
- Country Progressive Party was a split from the United Country Party in Victoria in the late 1920s, but reunited in 1930
- Liberal Country Party, a group loyal to John McEwen who split from the United Country Party in Victoria from 1938 to 1943
- Liberal and Country Party, operated as the state division of the Liberal Party of Australia in Victoria from 1949 until 1965
- Country Liberal Party formed in 1974 in the Northern Territory and continues to exist
- Country Labor Party is a registered party affiliated with the Australian Labor Party
- New Country Party, active 2003–2008, was a splinter from One Nation in Queensland, WA and NSW
- United Country Party (Australia), the Victorian branch of the Country Party from 1930
- Progressive Country Party, a 1921 South Australian merger between the National Party and dissident Liberals
