= 1960 Bendigo by-election =

A by-election was held for the Australian House of Representatives seat of Bendigo on 16 July 1960. This was triggered by the death of Labor MP Percy Clarey. A by-election for the seat of Balaclava was held on the same day.

The by-election was won by Labor candidate Noel Beaton.

== Results ==
Bendigo by-election, 1960
Party	Candidate	Votes	%	±%
Labor	Noel Beaton	20,290	48.0	−0.5
Liberal	Henry Snell	15,773	37.3	−1.1
Democratic Labor	Bill Drechsler	6,200	14.7	+1.6
Total formal votes		42,263	99.2	
Informal votes		345	0.8	
Turnout		42,608	94.1	
Two-party-preferred result
Labor	Noel Beaton	21,198	50.2	−0.1
Liberal	Henry Snell	21,065	49.8	+0.1
Labor hold		Swing	−0.1	
