= Division of Balaclava =

Former Australian federal electoral division

Coordinates: 37.905°S 144.996°E

Balaclava Australian House of Representatives Division
- Created: 1901
- Abolished: 1984
- Namesake: Balaclava

The Division of Balaclava was an Australian electoral division in the state of Victoria. The division was proclaimed in 1900, and was one of the original 65 divisions to be contested at the first federal election. It was named after the suburb of Balaclava, which in turn was named after a battlefield of the Crimean War. It was based in the wealthy inner southern suburbs of Melbourne, including Brighton and Sandringham. It was always a safe seat for the conservative parties, being held successively by Protectionist Party, Nationalist Party, United Australia Party and Liberal Party members. It was abolished and replaced by the Division of Goldstein in 1984.

== Members ==
Image	Member	Party	Term	Notes
	Sir George Turner (1851–1916)	Protectionist	30 March 1901 – 8 November 1906	Previously held the Victorian Legislative Assembly seat of St Kilda. Served as Treasurer under Barton, Deakin and Reid. Retired
	Agar Wynne (1850–1934)	Independent Protectionist	12 December 1906 – 26 May 1909	Previously a member of the Victorian Legislative Council. Served as minister under Cook. Retired. Later elected to the Victorian Legislative Assembly seat of St Kilda in 1917
	Agar Wynne (1850–1934)	Liberal	26 May 1909 – 30 July 1914	Previously a member of the Victorian Legislative Council. Served as minister under Cook. Retired. Later elected to the Victorian Legislative Assembly seat of St Kilda in 1917
	William Watt (1871–1946)	Liberal	5 September 1914 – 17 February 1917	Previously held the Victorian Legislative Assembly seat of Essendon. Served as minister under Hughes. Served as Speaker during the Bruce Government. Resigned due to ill health
	William Watt (1871–1946)	Nationalist	17 February 1917 – 10 August 1922	Previously held the Victorian Legislative Assembly seat of Essendon. Served as minister under Hughes. Served as Speaker during the Bruce Government. Resigned due to ill health
	William Watt (1871–1946)	Liberal Union	10 August 1922 – 1925	Previously held the Victorian Legislative Assembly seat of Essendon. Served as minister under Hughes. Served as Speaker during the Bruce Government. Resigned due to ill health
	William Watt (1871–1946)	Nationalist	1925 – 5 July 1929	Previously held the Victorian Legislative Assembly seat of Essendon. Served as minister under Hughes. Served as Speaker during the Bruce Government. Resigned due to ill health
	Thomas White (1888–1957)	Nationalist	3 August 1929 – 7 May 1931	Served as minister under Lyons and Menzies. Resigned to become the High Commissioner to the United Kingdom
	Thomas White (1888–1957)	United Australia	7 May 1931 – 21 February 1945	Served as minister under Lyons and Menzies. Resigned to become the High Commissioner to the United Kingdom
	Thomas White (1888–1957)	Liberal	21 February 1945 – 21 June 1951	Served as minister under Lyons and Menzies. Resigned to become the High Commissioner to the United Kingdom
	Percy Joske (1895–1981)	Liberal	28 July 1951 – 2 June 1960	Resigned to become a Judge of the Commonwealth Industrial Court
	Ray Whittorn (1911–1995)	Liberal	16 July 1960 – 11 April 1974	Retired
	Ian Macphee (1938–)	Liberal	18 May 1974 – 1 December 1984	Served as minister under Fraser. Transferred to the Division of Goldstein after Balaclava was abolished in 1984
