= Noel Beaton =

Australian politician (1925–2004)

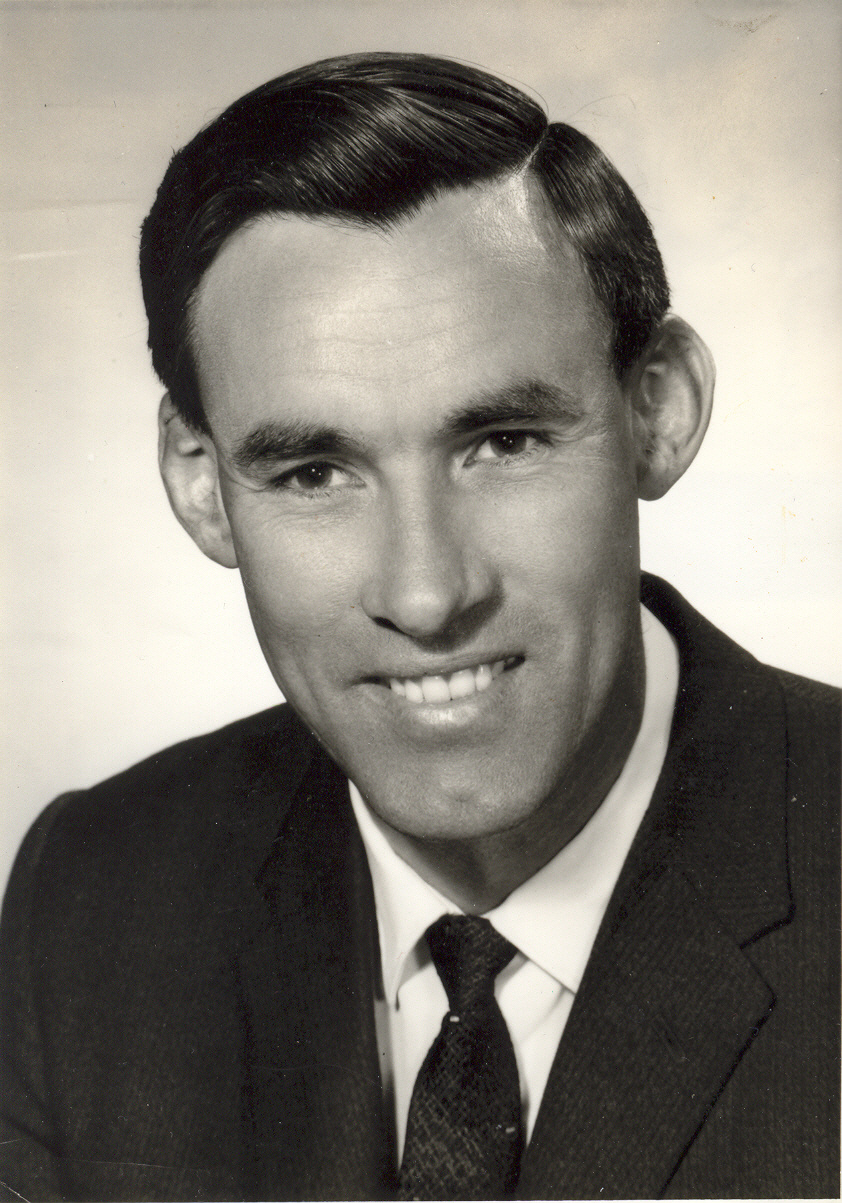

Member of the Australian Parliament for Bendigo
- In office 16 July 1960 – 9 April 1969
- Preceded by: Percy Clarey
- Succeeded by: David Kennedy

Personal details
- Born: 28 December 1925 Mooroopna, Victoria
- Died: 18 December 2004 (aged 78) Melbourne, Victoria
- Party: Australian Labor Party
- Occupation: Journalist

Noel Lawrence Beaton (28 December 1925 – 18 December 2004) was an Australian politician. Born in Mooroopna, Victoria, he was educated at state schools and was a volunteer firefighter in his home town, before serving in the military from 1945 to 1947, after which he became a sports journalist and broadcaster.

In 1960, he was elected to the Australian House of Representatives as the Labor member for Bendigo, narrowly winning a by-election for that seat that followed the death of Percy Clarey.

Melbourne newspaper The Age later reported that his 133-vote winning margin was probably because of the donkey vote, but his personal following grew steadily "until it reached about 1500 in 1966, a time when Labor's Australia-wide vote was at an all-time low."

During his time in Parliament he became a leading contributor on petrochemical policy, served as Shadow Minister for Primary Industries, wrote regional development into Labor policy and was a vocal opponent of the Vietnam War. For his achievements, he was widely considered a potential Minister in a Labor government.

As a local MP however, Beaton took greater pride in the many small victories he won for individual residents of his sprawling regional electorate. He was particularly proud of his success in helping save Bendigo's Chinese Joss House. Discovering that elderly members of the Chinese community were still using the derelict building as a place of worship, but had to do so in secret because it was on Defence Department land, he persuaded the department to hand over the land for the benefit of the community. The Joss House was eventually restored and opened to anyone who wanted to worship there or learn about the city's Chinese history.

Beaton retired from parliament on 9 April 1969, and never again held political office. His personal following at the time he retired from politics was such that both Labor and Liberal candidates in the resulting by-election publicly claimed to aspire to being like him. After retiring from political office, Beaton returned to journalism, running the editorial side of regional daily newspaper the Bendigo Advertiser during the early 1970s. In that role, he helped to rescue the city's historic town hall from planned demolition, with a front-page article that caused angry public protests. Beaton died in 2004.

Parliament of Australia
Preceded by Percy Clarey	Member for Bendigo; 1960–1969	Succeeded by David Kennedy
