= Thomas White (Australian politician) =

Australian aviator and politician (1888–1957)

Sir Thomas White KBE, DFC, VD
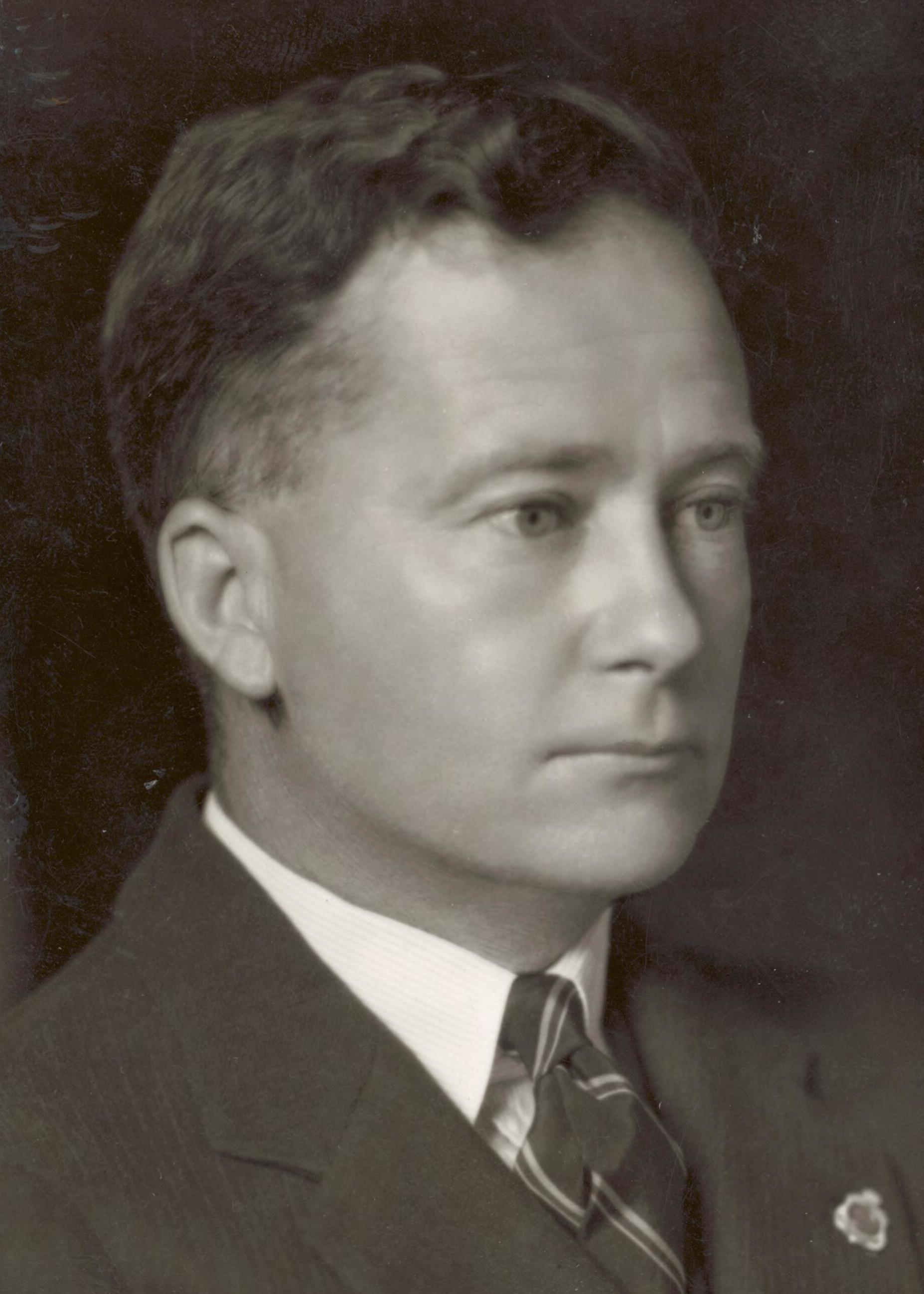
- White in Melbourne, c. 1940

Minister for Air and Civil Aviation
- In office 19 December 1949 – 11 May 1951
- Prime Minister: Robert Menzies
- Preceded by: Arthur Drakeford
- Succeeded by: Philip McBride (Air); Larry Anthony (Civil Aviation)

Minister for Trade and Customs
- In office 14 January 1933 – 8 November 1938
- Prime Minister: Joseph Lyons
- Preceded by: Henry Gullett
- Succeeded by: John Perkins

High Commissioner to the United Kingdom
- In office 21 June 1951 – 20 June 1956
- Preceded by: Eric Harrison
- Succeeded by: Eric Harrison

Member of the Australian Parliament for Balaclava
- In office 3 August 1929 – 21 June 1951
- Preceded by: William Watt
- Succeeded by: Percy Joske

Personal details
- Born: 26 April 1888 North Melbourne, Victoria
- Died: 13 October 1957 (aged 69) South Yarra, Victoria
- Party: Nationalist (1929–1931); United Australia (1931–1945); Liberal (1945–1951)
- Spouse: Vera Deakin (m. 1920)
- Profession: Soldier; company director

Military service
- Allegiance: Australia
- Branch/service: Citizen Military Forces (1902‍–‍1940); Australian Flying Corps (1914‍–‍1920); Citizen Air Force (1940‍–‍1944)
- Service years: 1902–1944
- Rank: Group captain
- Unit: Mesopotamian Half Flight (1915)
- Commands: 6th Battalion (1926‍–‍1931)
- Battles/wars: First World War; Mesopotamian campaign; Second World War; European theatre
- Awards: Knight Commander of the Order of the British Empire; Distinguished Flying Cross; Mentioned in Despatches (2); Colonial Auxiliary Forces Officers' Decoration

Sir Thomas Walter White, KBE, DFC, VD (26 April 1888 – 13 October 1957) was an Australian politician and pilot in the First World War. In 1914 he became one of the first airmen trained for the Australian Flying Corps (AFC), and the following year he was among the first AFC members to see action when he was deployed to the Middle East with the Mesopotamian Half Flight. After carrying out several missions behind Turkish lines, he was captured in November 1915 but escaped in July 1918. White was awarded the Distinguished Flying Cross and twice mentioned in despatches for his war service. He married Vera Deakin, a Red Cross worker and daughter of former Australian prime minister Alfred Deakin, in 1920.

White began his parliamentary career in 1929 when he was elected to the House of Representatives as the Member for Balaclava in Victoria. He served as Minister for Trade and Customs in Joseph Lyons's United Australia Party government from 1933 to 1938, but resigned when he was excluded from Lyons's inner cabinet. He joined the Royal Australian Air Force (RAAF) shortly after the outbreak of the Second World War and saw service in Australia and the United Kingdom. Returning to parliament as a member of the newly formed Liberal Party in 1945, he served as Minister for Air and Minister for Civil Aviation in Robert Menzies's government from 1949 to 1951. His term coincided with the commitment of RAAF squadrons to the Korean War and the Malayan Emergency. Australia's high commissioner to the United Kingdom from 1951 to 1956, White was knighted in 1952 and died in 1957.

== Early life ==
Thomas Walter White was born on 26 April 1888 at Hotham, North Melbourne. He was the son of Charles James White, a brass-finisher from England, and Emily Jane (née Jenkins) of Victoria. Educated at Moreland State School, White joined the Citizen Forces as a trumpeter in 1902. He served in artillery and engineering units for the next eight years. In January 1911 he was commissioned as a second lieutenant in the 5th Australian Regiment. He was promoted to lieutenant in June 1912, and to captain in November 1913.

== First World War ==
In August 1914, two weeks after the outbreak of the First World War, White became one of the first four students to begin training at Point Cook as a pilot in the Australian Flying Corps (AFC). He was later described by a biographer as "pugnacious and impatient for success, with a disdain for authority and a suspicion of elites". White recalled flying in the school's Bristol Boxkite: "The senses took the place of the instruments. One's eyes and ears did duty as engine counters; the rush of the air in the face told whether the climb or glide was at the right angle." In September he crashed the Boxkite into Point Cook's hangar while attempting to land in a crosswind; the dent he made was never repaired, and came to be recognised as part of the base's history. The Australian Aero Club held its inaugural meeting at Point Cook in October; White was the club's first secretary. The following month, he graduated from his flying course with his fellow students, who included the future Chief of the Air Staff, Richard Williams.

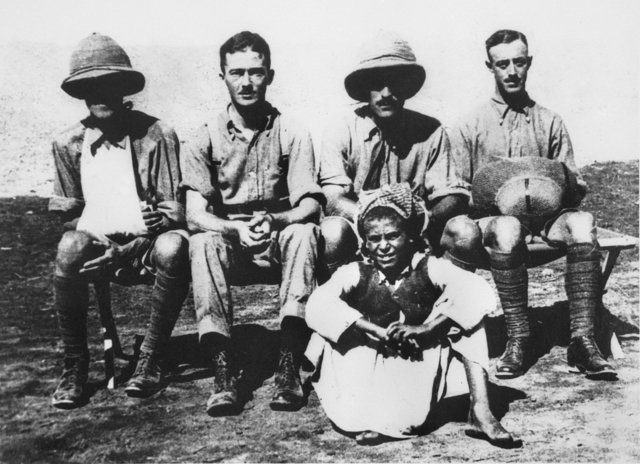
Captain White (second left) with Captain Henry Petre (far left) and Lieutenant George Merz (far right) of the Mesopotamian Half Flight at Basra, July 1915

In April 1915, White was appointed a captain in the Australian Imperial Force and adjutant of the Mesopotamian Half Flight, the first AFC unit to see active service. Based initially in Basra on the Shatt-el-Arab waterway and operating primitive Maurice Farman biplanes, the Half Flight assisted the Indian Army during the Mesopotamian campaign, conducting reconnaissance and sabotage missions against Turkish forces. The Farmans' top speed was only 50 miles per hour (80 km/h), and the desert wind could reach 80 miles per hour (130 km/h) – meaning the aircraft often made no headway or were simply blown backwards.

White carried out several reconnaissance and bombing operations behind enemy lines. On a mission in October 1915, he was forced to land owing to engine trouble and, rather than risk attempting repairs, taxied the aircraft some twenty-four kilometres (fifteen miles) past enemy troops while his observer, Captain Francis Yeats-Brown, kept watch with his rifle at the ready; the "Keystone Cops adventure", as historian Alan Stephens described it, culminated in the engine finally powering up and allowing White to take off and fly to the safety of the Australian base. White himself touted the feat as "a taxi-ing record". The following month, he undertook a search for Major General George Kemball, whose seaplane had gone missing between Kut and Aziziyeh; White located the missing plane near a large Arab encampment, and despite being fired on by the tribesmen was able to rescue the general and transport him to Aziziyeh.

On 13 November 1915, White was captured on a mission to cut telegraph wires near Baghdad. After damaging their aircraft on landing, White and Yeats-Brown were fired on by Arabs and Turks; Yeats-Brown succeeded in destroying the wires while White held off their attackers with rifle fire. The men attempted to taxi their aircraft away but were overpowered and beaten by Arabs before being handed over to Turkish troops. White was mentioned in despatches in July 1916. He was initially imprisoned in Mosul, then in Afion Kara Hissar, enduring harsh conditions. In July 1918 he was being transported by rail to Constantinople when his train was wrecked and he escaped. Disguising himself as a Turk, he hid in a Ukrainian cargo ship berthed in Constantinople harbour. After a month the ship sailed for Odessa, where White remained another month using a fake Russian passport. His experience of the Soviets in Odessa helped inform his subsequent anti-communism. He then stowed away on a hospital ship bound for Bulgaria, and made his way to London in December. White was awarded the Distinguished Flying Cross in June 1919. That December, he was again mentioned in despatches, for "valuable services whilst in captivity". He subsequently published an account of his wartime exploits as Guests of the Unspeakable.

== Early parliamentary career ==
While in London, White met Vera Deakin, a Red Cross worker and daughter of former Australian Prime Minister Alfred Deakin, and soon became engaged to her. Departing Britain in September 1919, White returned to Australia via the United States and was discharged from the AIF in January 1920. He married Vera on 22 March at St John's Church of England in Toorak, despite the opposition of some of the Deakin family, including her brother-in-law Herbert Brookes. White, whose sympathies tended towards small business, considered Brookes a "business bully", hiding behind "the protection of capital". Also in 1920, White became managing director of his father's hardware company, C. J. White & Sons Pty Ltd. He continued to serve in the Citizen Military Forces (CMF, the renamed Citizen Forces), receiving promotion to major in July 1922, and commanding the 6th Battalion as a lieutenant colonel from March 1926 to March 1931. In 1923 he was awarded the Colonial Auxiliary Forces Officers' Decoration, which recognised twenty years of service. White enlisted as a special constable when Victorian police went on strike in November that year; he would later express support for groups such as the New Guard.

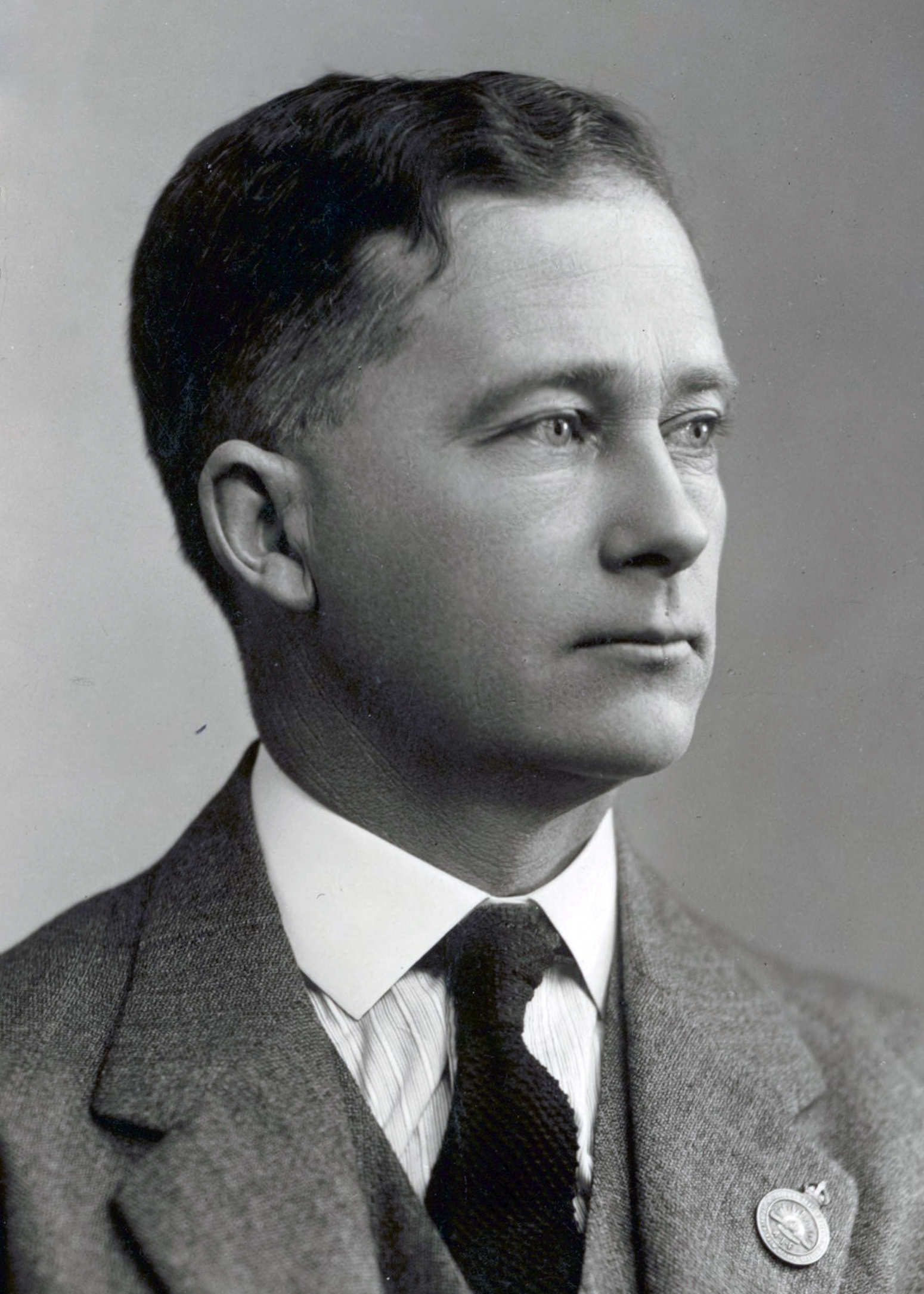
White in the 1930s

White ran as a Nationalist for the House of Representatives seat of Maribyrnong in the 1925 federal elections, but lost to the sitting Labor member, James Fenton, 19,483 votes to 28,621. In 1927, he failed to win the Victorian Legislative Assembly seat of Prahran. After the Nationalists declined to endorse him as a candidate for the Senate the following year, he won the seat of Balaclava at a by-election held on 3 August 1929. He defeated his only opponent, Independent Nationalist Frederick Francis, with 28,642 votes to 16,063, to succeed retiring member William Watt. White used his maiden speech in parliament to push for construction of the Australian War Memorial in Canberra. In the federal election held that October, he defeated the Labor contender, Donald Cameron, 31,700 votes to 22,445. The United Australia Party (UAP) came to power in the December 1931 federal elections; White was returned by a margin of 30,294.

In January 1933, White was appointed Minister for Trade and Customs in Joseph Lyons's first ministry, replacing Henry Gullett, who had stood down due to ill-health. White had given up the directorship of C. J. White & Sons the previous year. Although he personally favoured protectionism, his portfolio was responsible for reducing tariffs, as well as attempting to increase trade with Britain as opposed to the United States and Japan. He was also in charge of book and film censorship; for the latter he established an advisory board, chaired by Robert Garran, to make recommendations to him. In the September 1934 federal elections, White retained Balaclava by a margin of 25,769 votes. That year he became Australian chairman of the Royal Life Saving Society, serving until 1951; he was also an active supporter of such organisations as Legacy and the Royal Flying Doctor Service. Vera White, who had been appointed an Officer of the Order of the British Empire for her wartime work, also pursued philanthropic activities, holding management or committee roles with the Royal Children's Hospital, the Victorian Society for Crippled Children and Adults, and the Red Cross.

The October 1937 federal elections saw White returned by a margin of 20,954. In July 1938, he represented Australia at an inter-governmental conference on Jewish refugees held at Évian, France, to discuss the growing numbers of Jewish emigrants seeking to leave Germany and occupied territories. He sympathised with refugees he spoke to during the conference, but he hedged his offer of support: "As we have no real racial problem, we are not desirous of importing one by encouraging any scheme of large-scale foreign migration." Australia agreed to accept 15,000 refugees over three years. White's reaction to the Australian government's support for the Munich Agreement was to diarise: "I think we should hang our heads that we did not stand up to the bully of Europe ... It may yet mean peace but at what price?" He called for stronger preparations at home in case of war, including the introduction of conscription. On 8 November 1938, White resigned his portfolio, having discovered that Lyons had established an inner cabinet from which he was excluded; he was succeeded as Minister for Trade and Customs by John Perkins. Lyons's response in parliament to White's resignation publicly highlighted the divisions in the UAP. White stood for the UAP's leadership after Lyons's death the following year, but was eliminated early in the balloting; Robert Menzies narrowly defeated Billy Hughes in the final ballot.

== Second World War and later parliamentary career ==
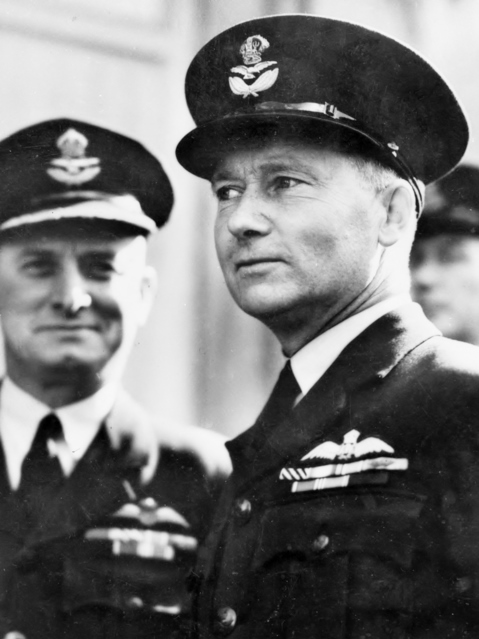
Wing Commander White (right) serving with the RAAF in Great Britain, March 1942

Following the outbreak of the Second World War, White transferred from the CMF to the Citizen Air Force, the active reserve of the Royal Australian Air Force (RAAF), as a flight lieutenant (temporary squadron leader). He took leave from parliament in April 1940 and was appointed the inaugural commanding officer of No. 1 Initial Training School (ITS) at Somers, Victoria. In this capacity he was responsible for the first group of Empire Air Training Scheme (EATS) trainees in Australia, thirty-five student aircrew. In the September 1940 federal election, White defeated Labor's Charles Sandford with 43,876 votes to 17,135. He relinquished command of No. 1 ITS in September 1941; at this time the school had more than nine hundred pupils. White was subsequently posted to England, initially to oversee the Australian contingent at RAF Station Bournemouth. Arriving at Bournemouth as a wing commander in November 1941, he proceeded to organise EATS graduates from Australia into their own distinct section under the RAF's No. 3 Personnel Reception Centre. He also facilitated improvements in accommodation, services, and postings for the Australians at Bournemouth. In June 1942, he became RAAF Liaison Officer at RAF Flying Training Command, where he worked to improve procedures for commissioning and promoting Australian airmen.

By May 1943, the Australian contingent at Bournemouth had outgrown its facilities and transferred to Brighton, where White was given command of the RAF station. According to the Parliamentary Library of Australia, White also "surreptitiously flew on several sorties as a second-pilot" while in Britain. He paid tribute to the men of EATS with the narrative poem Sky Saga. White returned to Australia to contest the August 1943 federal election, defeating Labor's John Barry with 38,698 votes to 28,271. He served at the RAAF Staff School, located at Mount Martha, Victoria, until his retirement as an honorary group captain; he was medically discharged on 28 October 1944. The same month, he attended the conference that resulted in the establishment of the Liberal Party, which succeeded the UAP; the new party was officially launched under Robert Menzies's leadership in August 1945. In June 1946, now as the Liberal member for Balaclava, White unsuccessfully called for a royal commission into problems of command in the RAAF during the war. He retained Balaclava by a majority of over 13,000 in the September 1946 federal election, defeating Labor's Maurice Ashkanasy.

A boundary redistribution prior to the December 1949 federal elections reduced Balaclava from 84,000 voters to just under 43,000; White retained the seat against the Labor contender by a margin of 14,361. Following the Liberal Party victory, White was appointed Minister for Air and Minister for Civil Aviation, despite his personal animosity towards Menzies, which partly stemmed from the latter's failure to serve in the First World War. He took over his portfolios from Arthur Drakeford, who had held them for eight years. In January 1950, White and the Minister for Supply and Development, Richard Casey, announced that the English Electric Canberra had been selected to replace the RAAF's Avro Lincoln bombers and that the new jet would be manufactured by the Government Aircraft Factory in Victoria. White's term as Minister for Air saw the deployment of RAAF squadrons to the Korean War and the Malayan Emergency in mid-1950, and the establishment of the Women's Royal Australian Air Force, the successor organisation to the wartime Women's Auxiliary Australian Air Force, that November. The following year he gave his approval for the manufacture of a Rolls-Royce-engined licensed version of the North American F-86 Sabre jet fighter for the RAAF, and played a major part in the controversial decision to replace the long-serving Chief of the Air Staff, Air Marshal George Jones, with an RAF officer, Air Vice Marshal (later Air Chief Marshal Sir) Donald Hardman. White also sought to strengthen the Citizen Air Force, and personally ordered the establishment of No. 24 (City of Adelaide) Squadron at Mallala, South Australia.

== Later life and legacy ==
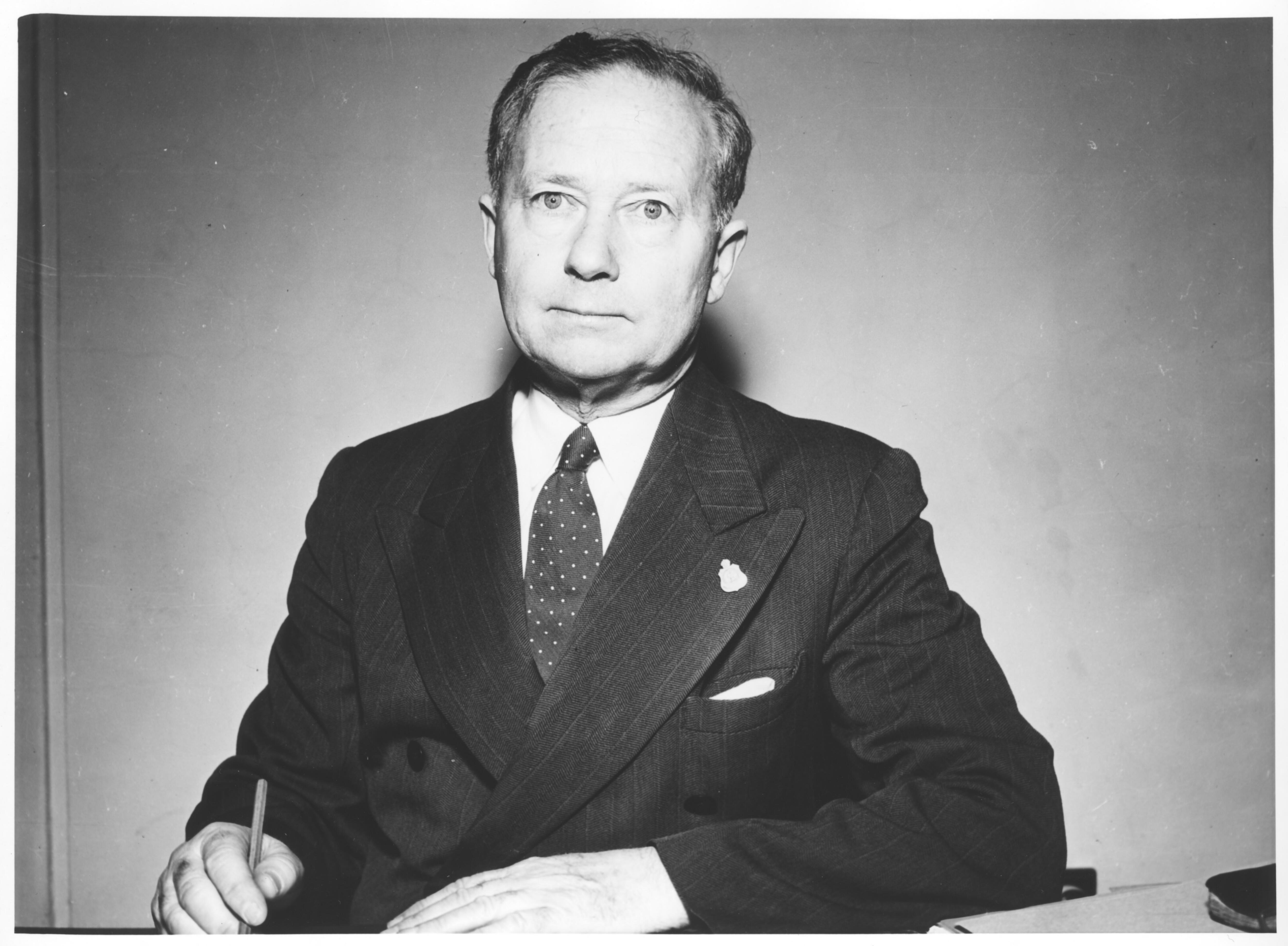
White in 1950

White secured his tenth election victory in Balaclava in the April 1951 federal election, defeating Labor's Arthur Lewis by 10,700 votes. On 21 June, he resigned from parliament to become Australian High Commissioner to the United Kingdom, a position he held until 1956. He was succeeded as the member for Balaclava by Liberal Percy Joske, as Minister for Air by Philip McBride, and as Minister for Civil Aviation by Hubert Anthony. White was appointed a Knight Commander of the Order of the British Empire in January 1952. As High Commissioner he advocated continued British migration to Australia and participated in the renewal of the assisted passage scheme between the two countries in 1954. He was succeeded by Sir Eric Harrison. After returning to Australia, White lived in Melbourne. He suffered from emphysema and on 13 October 1957 died of a heart attack at his home in South Yarra. Survived by his wife and four daughters, he was accorded a state funeral at St Paul's Cathedral, Melbourne, and interred at Point Lonsdale cemetery.

The T. W. White Society, founded in 1982, sponsors an annual prize for thoracic research awarded through the Thoracic Society of Queensland. White's daughters donated his papers to the National Library of Australia in 1997 and 1998.

== Notes ==
Political offices
Preceded by Henry Gullett	Minister for Trade and Customs; 1932–1938	Succeeded by John Perkins
Preceded by Arthur Drakeford	Minister for Air; 1949–1951	Succeeded by Philip McBride
Preceded by Arthur Drakeford	Minister for Civil Aviation; 1949–1951	Succeeded by Hubert Lawrence Anthony
Parliament of Australia
Preceded by William Watt	Member for Balaclava; 1929–1951	Succeeded by Percy Joske
Diplomatic posts
Preceded by Vacant; Last held by: Jack Beasley	Australian High Commissioner to the United Kingdom; 1951–1956	Succeeded by Sir Eric Harrison
