= William Watt (Australian politician) =

Australian politician (1871–1946)

The Right Honourable William Watt
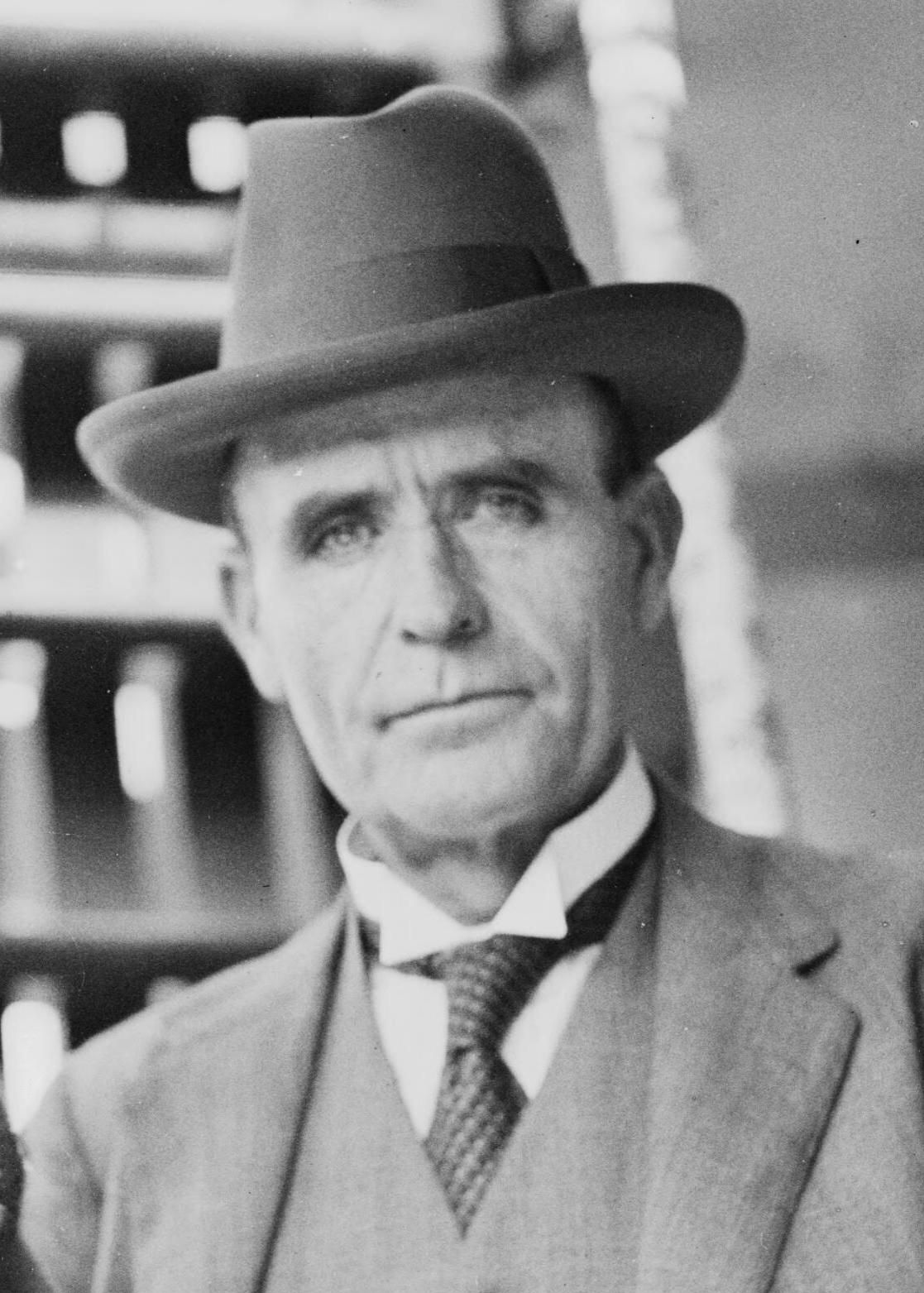

Speaker of the Australian House of Representatives
- In office 28 February 1923 – 12 January 1926
- Preceded by: Elliot Johnson
- Succeeded by: Littleton Groom

Treasurer of Australia
- In office 27 March 1918 – 27 July 1920
- Prime Minister: Billy Hughes
- Preceded by: John Forrest
- Succeeded by: Joseph Cook

24th Premier of Victoria
- In office 22 December 1913 – 18 June 1914
- Preceded by: George Elmslie
- Succeeded by: Alexander Peacock
- In office 18 May 1912 – 9 December 1913
- Preceded by: John Murray
- Succeeded by: George Elmslie

Member of the Australian Parliament for Balaclava
- In office 5 September 1914 – 5 July 1929
- Preceded by: Agar Wynne
- Succeeded by: Thomas White

Personal details
- Born: 23 November 1871 Barfold, Victoria, British Empire
- Died: 13 September 1946 (aged 74) Toorak, Victoria, Australia
- Party: Victorian Liberals (to 1914); Commonwealth Liberal (1914–1917); Nationalist Party (from 1917)
- Spouses: Florence Carrighan (m. 1894; died 1896) Emily Seismann (m. 1907)

William Alexander Watt (23 November 1871 – 13 September 1946) was an Australian politician. He served two terms as Premier of Victoria before entering federal politics in 1914. He then served as a minister in the government of Billy Hughes from 1917 to 1920, including as acting prime minister during World War I, and finally as Speaker of the House of Representatives from 1923 to 1926.

== Early life ==
Watt was born on 23 November 1871 in Barfold, Victoria, a rural locality near Kyneton. He was the youngest of eleven children born to Jane (née Douglas) and James Michie Watt, a farmer. His father was born in Scotland and arrived in Australia in 1843, while his mother was born in Ireland.

Watt's father died the year after he was born, and the family subsequently moved to Phillip Island. Six years later they moved to Melbourne, where Watt began his education at the Errol Street State School (now North Melbourne Primary School). He left school at a young age, finding work as a newsboy and later as a clerk at an ironmongery and a tannery. In 1888 he began attending night classes in accountancy at the Working Men's College. He qualified as an accountant and eventually became a partner in a "hay and corn store". Watt was secretary of the North Melbourne Debating Club and served on the executive of the Australasian Federation League of Victoria. He was prominent in the Australian Natives' Association and campaigned for federation, becoming a protégé of the Victorian liberal leader Alfred Deakin.

== State politics ==
In 1897 Watt was elected to the Victorian Legislative Assembly for North Melbourne, defeating Labor's George Prendergast (another future Premier), but at the 1900 election Prendergast recaptured the seat. In 1902 he was returned for the safe liberal seat of East Melbourne, holding that seat until 1904, when he shifted to Essendon. In 1899 he became Postmaster-General in the short-lived government of Allan McLean, then sat out Thomas Bent's government, returning to office under John Murray in 1909 as treasurer, a post he held until 1912. By that time he was leader of the "urban" faction of the Liberal Party, opposed to Murray's rural-dominated government. When Murray resigned as premier on 12 May, Watt succeeded him.

In December 1913 the rural faction, now led by Donald McLeod, moved a successful no-confidence motion in Watt's government, with Labor support. McLeod expected to become premier, but instead the acting governor, Sir John Madden, sent for the Labor leader, George Elmslie, who formed Victoria's first Labor government. This forced the Liberal factions to re-unite, and a few days later Elmslie was duly voted out and Watt resumed office. Frustrated by his inability to overcome the factionalism of the Victorian Liberals and pass any effective legislation, Watt resigned as Premier in June 1914, allowing Sir Alexander Peacock to re-assume the Liberal leadership.

== Federal politics ==
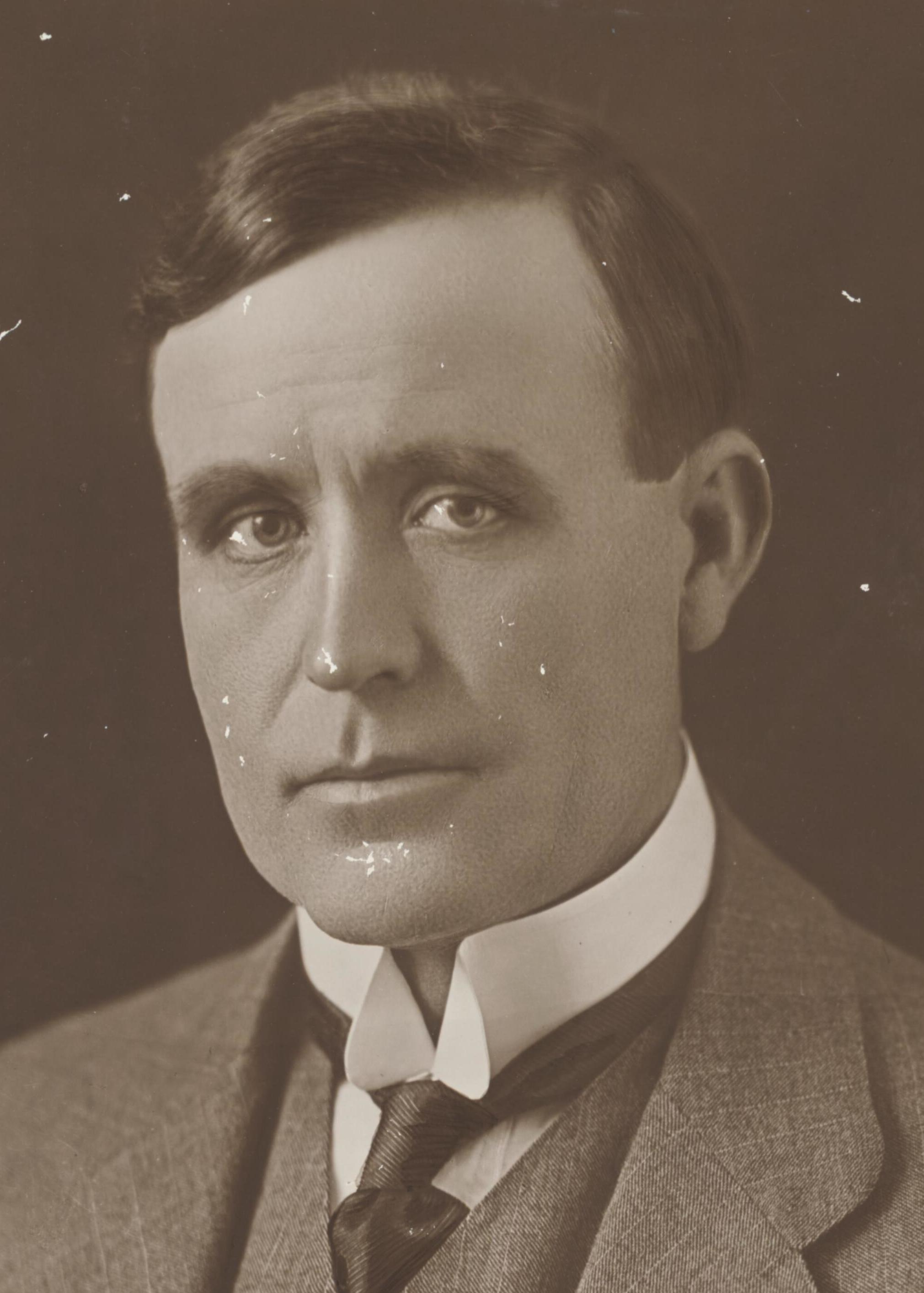
Watt c. 1910

Watt was elected to the House of Representatives at the 1914 federal election, defeating ALP candidate John Curtin in the safe Liberal seat of Balaclava.

During World War I, Watt and the Liberal Party supported Prime Minister Billy Hughes' plan to send conscripted troops to fight overseas, a subject which caused a major split in the Labor Party. He endorsed plans to form a national unity government with Hughes' breakaway National Labor Party, supporting Hughes to remain as prime minister despite the Liberals' superior numbers in parliament. He was subsequently appointed Minister for Works and Railways in the second Hughes ministry and won re-election as a Nationalist Party at the 1917 election.

=== Acting prime minister ===
In March 1918 Watt was appointed treasurer, and became in effect Hughes's deputy. When Hughes left Australia for London in April, Watt became acting prime minister, a position he held until Hughes returned from the Versailles peace conference in August 1919. It was during his time as Treasurer that Watt opined that the war effort was best served by "...putting the country into the hands of a Committee of Public Safety. It is doubtful if a democracy can fight a great autocracy." During this period he also had the portfolio of Trade and Customs. For his service as acting prime minister, Watt was appointed to the Imperial Privy Council in the 1920 New Year Honours, entitling him to the style "The Right Honourable".

He was a trusted figure in Melbourne business circles and shared the dissatisfaction that most conservatives felt at the increasingly erratic and autocratic way Hughes ran the government. He also disliked Hughes personally and felt that Hughes had not acknowledged his efforts as acting prime minister. Although he remained loyal in public, he was keen to leave Hughes's ministry, and was seen by many as Hughes's likely successor.

=== Later years ===
In April 1920 Hughes dispatched Watt to London on a financial mission. Watt was in poor health, and his suspicion that Hughes was trying to get him out of the way was aggravated by Hughes's habit of communicating directly with the British government over the head of Watt, who was supposedly his representative. Watt was appointed Australia's representative at the Spa Conference on War reparations, but when Hughes cabled that Watt was not to agree to anything without consulting him, Watt complained that he was being treated like "a telegraph messenger." After an acrimonious exchange of cables, Watt resigned as Treasurer and returned to Australia.

Watt spent the next two years on the back bench. At the 1922 elections he supported rebel former Liberals in Victoria who opposed Hughes and stood against Nationalist candidates: one of these, John Latham, won the seat of Kooyong from the Nationalist member. After the elections, the newly formed Country Party held the balance of power, and used it to force Hughes's resignation. Watt was passed over for leadership of the new coalition government in favour of the Treasurer, Stanley Bruce. As a consolation prize Watt was elected Speaker, a position he held until 1926. Although not happy about the demands on his time made by the move of the federal parliament from Melbourne to Canberra in 1927, he re-contested his seat at the 1928 federal election, but resigned from parliament nine months later, on medical advice.

== Later life ==
Watt was chairman of several companies within the Collins House Group in Melbourne, including Barnet Glass, Dunlop Perdriau Rubber, Dunlop Rubber Australia, as well as the Silverton Tramway Company and Qantas. He was also chairman of trustees for the Melbourne Cricket Ground from 1924 to 1946 and the inaugural president of the Victorian division of the English-Speaking Union.

== Personal life ==
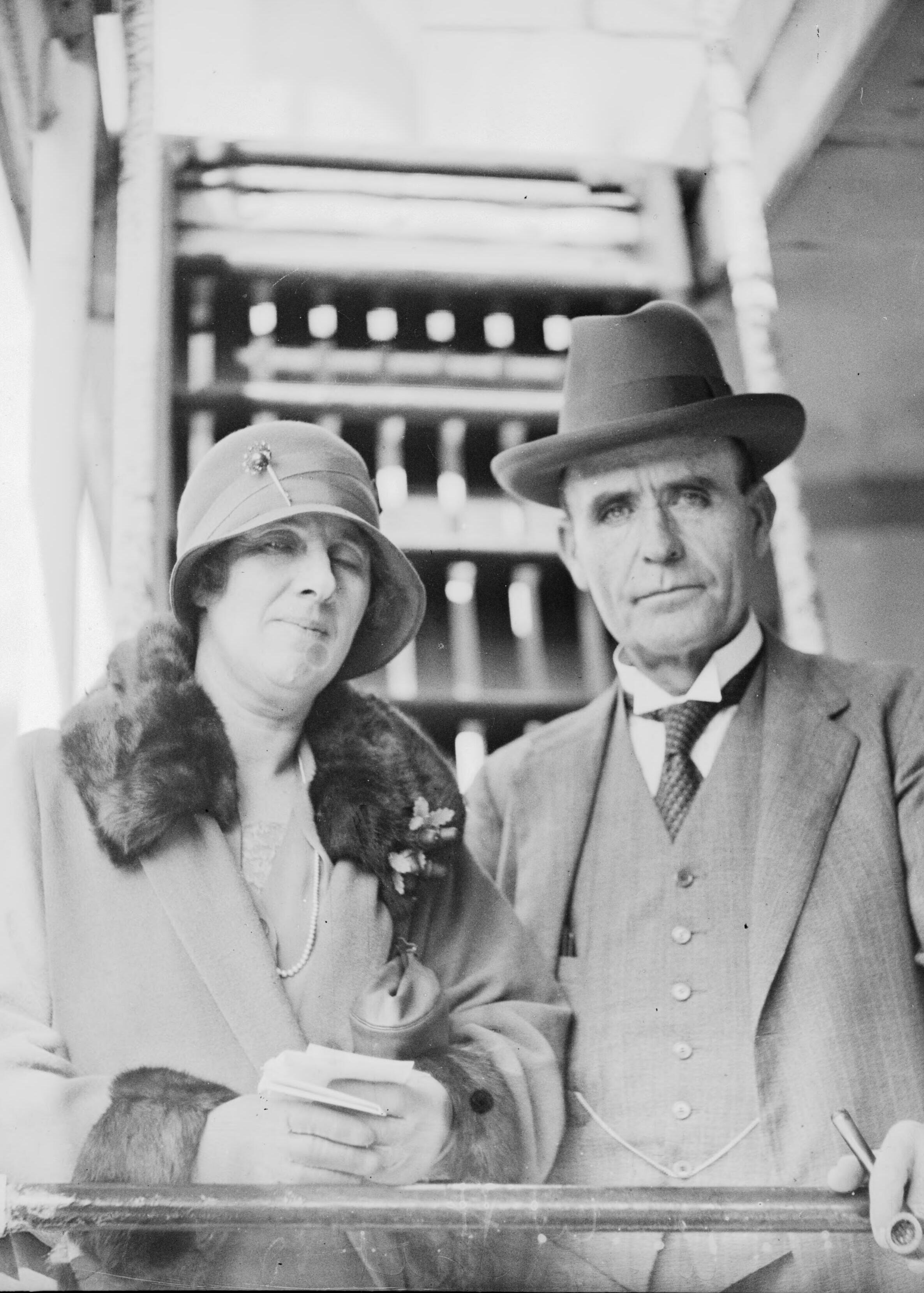
Watt and his second wife Emily (née Seismann)

Watt married Florence Carrighan in 1894, but was widowed two years later when she died in childbirth. He remarried in 1907 to Emily Helena Seismann, with whom he had two sons and three daughters. He was disabled by a stroke in 1937 and died at his home in Toorak on 13 September 1946, aged 74.

== Notes ==
Victorian Legislative Assembly
Preceded by George Prendergast	Member for North Melbourne; 1897–1900	Succeeded by George Prendergast
Preceded by John Deegan	Member for East Melbourne; 1902–1904	Succeeded by Samuel Gillott
District created	Member for Essendon; 1904–1914	Succeeded by Maurice Blackburn
Political offices
Preceded by John Murray	Premier of Victoria; 1912–1913	Succeeded by George Elmslie
Preceded by George Elmslie	Premier of Victoria; 1913–1914	Succeeded by Alexander Peacock
Australian House of Representatives
Preceded by Agar Wynne	Member for Balaclava; 1914–1929	Succeeded by Thomas White
Preceded by Sir Elliot Johnson	Speaker of the Australian House of Representatives; 1923–1926	Succeeded by Sir Littleton Groom
Political offices
Preceded by Patrick Lynch	Minister for Works and Railways; 1917–1918	Succeeded by Littleton Groom
Preceded by John Forrest	Treasurer of Australia; 1918–1920	Succeeded by Joseph Cook
Preceded by Jens Jensen	Minister for Trade and Customs; 1918–1919	Succeeded by Walter Massy-Greene
