= Ray Whittorn =

Australian politician

Ray Whittorn CBE
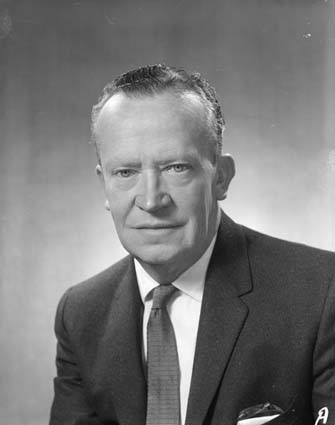

Member of the Australian Parliament for Balaclava
- In office 16 July 1960 – 11 April 1974
- Preceded by: Percy Joske
- Succeeded by: Ian Macphee

Personal details
- Born: 4 October 1911 Sydney
- Died: 10 August 1995 (aged 83)
- Party: Liberal Party of Australia
- Occupation: Engineer

Raymond Harold Whittorn, CBE (4 October 1911 – 10 August 1995) was an Australian politician. He was a Liberal Party of Australia member of the Australian House of Representatives from 1960 to 1974, representing the electorate of Balaclava.

Born in Sydney, he attended Sydney Technical College before becoming an electrical engineer. He worked as a cables superintended for the Olympic Tyre and Rubber Company before its cables division was spun out as Olympic Cables Ltd, after which he became factory manager and then from 1949 general manager. In 1953, he became sales manager at Johns Hydraulics Ltd.

In 1960, he was elected to the Australian House of Representatives in a by-election for the Melbourne seat of Balaclava caused by the resignation of Percy Joske; Whittorn represented the Liberal Party. He held the seat until his retirement in 1974.

Whittorn was made a Commander of the Order of the British Empire in the 1972 Birthday Honours. He died in 1995.

Parliament of Australia
Preceded by Percy Joske	Member for Balaclava; 1960–1974	Succeeded by Ian Macphee
