= Percy Joske =

Australian politician (1895–1981)

Sir Percy Joske CMG QC
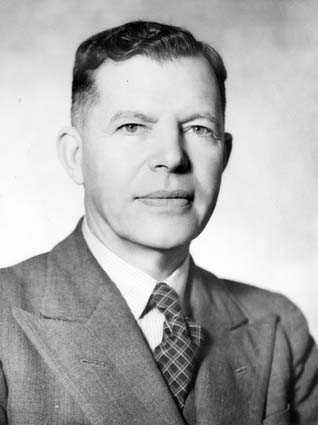

Member of the Australian Parliament for Balaclava
- In office 28 July 1951 – 2 June 1960
- Preceded by: Thomas White
- Succeeded by: Ray Whittorn

Personal details
- Born: 5 October 1895 Albert Park, Victoria, Australia
- Died: 25 April 1981 (aged 85) Strathfield, New South Wales, Australia
- Party: Liberal
- Spouses: Mavis Connell (m. 1928; died 1968) Hilda Dorothy Larcombe (m. 1969)
- Education: Wesley College, Melbourne; University of Melbourne
- Profession: Lawyer

Sir Percy Ernest Joske, CMG QC (5 October 1895 – 25 April 1981) was an Australian lawyer, politician and judge. He was a member of the House of Representatives from 1951 to 1960, representing the Liberal Party. He subsequently served on the Commonwealth Industrial Court from 1960 to 1977, as well as on the supreme courts of the Australian Capital Territory and Northern Territory. He was a prolific author of legal textbooks.

== Early life ==
Joske was born on 5 October 1895 in Albert Park, Victoria. He was the youngest of three children born to Evalyne (née Richards) and Ernest Joske. His mother died in childbirth and his father, a German-born solicitor, remarried in 1898.

Joske attended Wesley College, Melbourne, where he was classmates with future prime minister Robert Menzies. He went on to study arts and law at the University of Melbourne, graduating Bachelor of Laws (1915), Master of Laws (1918), Bachelor of Arts (1921) and Master of Arts (1923). He was admitted to the Victorian Bar in 1917.

== Legal career ==
Joske's legal practice specialised in divorce law. Appointed King's Counsel in 1944, he was the editor of the Victorian Law Reports from 1936 to 1956, lectured part-time at the University of Melbourne and wrote several legal textbooks. His obituary in The Canberra Times stated that he was "probably best known as the author of Law and Procedure at Meetings" (1938). His other works included The Remuneration of Commission Agents (1924), The Law of Marriage and Divorce (1925), The Law and Principles of Insurance in Australasia (1933), and Sale of Goods in Australia (1949). Joske inherited from his father an association with the dentistry profession, succeeding him as registrar of the Dental Board of Victoria in 1940 and giving lectures in dentistry case law at the Australian College of Dentistry.

== Politics ==
In 1951, he was elected to the Australian House of Representatives as the Liberal member for the blue-ribbon seat of Balaclava, being elected in the by-election following the resignation of Thomas White. Joske resigned in 1960 to become Judge of the Commonwealth Industrial Court. He was subsequently appointed to the Supreme Court of the Australian Capital Territory (1960–77) and the Supreme Court of the Northern Territory (1961–77). He was knighted in 1967, and died in 1981. He was also an author, and published a biography of Sir Robert Menzies a year before his death,.

== Personal life ==
In 1928, Joske married Mavis Connell, a music teacher. Their only child, Thomas Joske, became a judge of the Federal Court of Australia. He was widowed in 1968 and remarried in 1969 to Hilda Dorothy Larcombe (née Thomas), a cousin of his first wife. After their marriage he moved from Melbourne to Sydney, settling in her Georgian-revival mansion Somerset in the suburb of Strathfield, which was later acquired by Trinity Grammar School.

Outside of his parliamentary and judicial careers, Joske served as president of the Royal Life Saving Society Australia from 1951 to 1979. He was appointed Companion of the Order of St Michael and St George (CMG) in 1967 and created Knight Bachelor in 1977. In retirement he published a memoir of Robert Menzies titled Sir Robert Menzies 1894-1978: A New, Informal Memoir. He died in Strathfield on 25 April 1981, aged 85.

Parliament of Australia
Preceded by Thomas White	Member for Balaclava; 1951–1960	Succeeded by Ray Whittorn
