= Electoral results for the district of Gwydir =

Election results for state seat of Gwydir, New South Wales, Australia

Gwydir, an electoral district of the Legislative Assembly in the Australian state of New South Wales had two incarnations, from 1859 until 1894 and from 1904 until 1920.

Election	Member	Party
1859	Richard Jenkins	None
1860	Francis Rusden	None
1865	Thomas Dangar	None
1865 by	Thomas Dangar	None
1869	Thomas Dangar	None
1872	Thomas Dangar	None
1874	Thomas Dangar	None
1877	Thomas Dangar	None
1880	William Campbell	None
1882	William Campbell	None
1885	William Campbell	None
1886 by	Thomas Hassall	None
1887	Thomas Hassall	Protectionist
1889	Thomas Hassall	Protectionist
1891	Thomas Hassall	Protectionist
Election	Member	Party
1904	George Jones	Labour
1907	George Jones	Labour
1910	George Jones	Labour
1913	John Crane	Farmers and Settlers
1917	John Crane	Nationalist

== Election results ==
=== Elections in the 1910s ===
==== 1917 ====
1917 New South Wales state election: Gwydir
Party	Candidate	Votes	%	±%
Nationalist	John Crane	3,542	59.2	+4.4
Labor	William Scully	2,440	40.8	−4.4
Total formal votes		5,982	99.4	+2.0
Informal votes		38	0.6	−2.0
Turnout		6,020	61.0	−2.2
Nationalist hold		Swing	+4.4	

==== 1913 ====
1913 New South Wales state election: Gwydir
Party	Candidate	Votes	%	±%
Farmers and Settlers	John Crane (Note: Also endorsed by Liberal Reform.)	3,737	54.8	
Labor	George Jones	3,081	45.2	
Total formal votes		6,818	97.4	
Informal votes		182	2.6	
Turnout		7,000	63.2	
Farmers and Settlers gain from Labor				

==== 1910 ====
1910 New South Wales state election: The Gwydir
Party	Candidate	Votes	%	±%
Labour	George Jones	2,634	63.0	
Liberal Reform	Edward Spear	1,547	37.0	
Total formal votes		4,181	96.8	
Informal votes		138	3.2	
Turnout		4,319	46.6	
Labour hold				

=== Elections in the 1900s ===
==== 1907 ====
1907 New South Wales state election: The Gwydir
Party	Candidate	Votes	%	±%
Labour	George Jones	2,302	60.6	
Independent Liberal	Thomas Hogan	1,495	39.4	
Total formal votes		3,797	95.7	
Informal votes		169	4.3	
Turnout		3,966	54.8	
Labour hold				

==== 1904 ====
1904 New South Wales state election: The Gwydir
Party	Candidate	Votes	%	±%
Labour	George Jones	1,970	50.3	
Liberal Reform	Percy Stirton	1,945	49.7	
Total formal votes		3,915	99.1	
Informal votes		34	0.9	
Turnout		3,949	60.2	
Labour win		(new seat)		

The Gwydir was a new seat and comprised the abolished seat of Moree and part of Inverell. The member for Moree was Percy Stirton (Liberal Reform) and George Jones (Labour) was the member for Inverell.

District recreated

==== 1894 - 1904 ====
District abolished

=== Elections in the 1890s ===
==== 1891 ====
1891 New South Wales colonial election: The Gwydir Friday 3 July
Party	Candidate	Votes	%	±%
Protectionist	Thomas Hassall (elected)	841	56.4	
Labour	Leonard Court	649	43.6	
Total formal votes		1,490	97.1	
Informal votes		45	2.9	
Turnout		1,535	52.3	
Protectionist hold				

=== Elections in the 1880s ===
==== 1889 ====
1889 New South Wales colonial election: The Gwydir Monday 28 January
Party	Candidate	Votes	%	±%
Protectionist	Thomas Hassall (elected)	unopposed		
Protectionist hold				

==== 1887 ====
1887 New South Wales colonial election: The Gwydir Thursday 10 February
Party	Candidate	Votes	%	±%
Protectionist	Thomas Hassall (re-elected)	unopposed		

==== 1886 by-election ====
1886 Gwydir by-election Thursday 10 June
Candidate	Votes	%
Thomas Hassall (elected)	482	58.1
Thomas Mayne	211	25.5
James Wearne	136	16.4
Total formal votes	829	100.0
Informal votes	0	0.0
Turnout	829	38.1

William Campbell resigned.

==== 1885 ====
1885 New South Wales colonial election: The Gwydir Friday 23 October
Candidate	Votes	%
William Campbell (re-elected)	376	54.3
Thomas Dangar (defeated)	317	45.7
Total formal votes	693	96.3
Informal votes	27	3.8
Turnout	720	36.7

Thomas Dangar was the sitting member for The Namoi.

==== 1882 ====
1882 New South Wales colonial election: The Gwydir Wednesday 13 December
Candidate	Votes	%
William Campbell (re-elected)	405	68.4
Thomas Hassall	187	31.6
Total formal votes	592	98.2
Informal votes	11	1.8
Turnout	603	35.8

==== 1880 ====
1880 New South Wales colonial election: The Gwydir Tuesday 30 November
Candidate	Votes	%
William Campbell (elected)	unopposed	

The sitting member Thomas Dangar successfully contested The Namoi.

=== Elections in the 1870s ===
==== 1877 ====
1877 New South Wales colonial election: The Gwydir Monday 5 November
Candidate	Votes	%
Thomas Dangar (re-elected)	unopposed	

==== 1874-75 ====
1874–75 New South Wales colonial election: The Gwydir Saturday 26 December 1874
Candidate	Votes	%
Thomas Dangar (re-elected)	540	58.2
Captain W H Mosely	388	41.8
Total formal votes	928	98.5
Informal votes	14	1.5
Turnout	942	37.3

==== 1872 ====
1872 New South Wales colonial election: The Gwydir Thursday 21 March
Candidate	Votes	%
Thomas Dangar (re-elected)	213	29.9
Adolph Goldman	163	22.9
John Macansh	161	22.6
Alexander Bowman	103	14.5
David Jones	73	10.2
Total formal votes	713	97.3
Informal votes	20	2.7
Turnout	733	38.5

=== Elections in the 1860s ===
==== 1869-70 ====
1869–70 New South Wales colonial election: The Gwydir Friday 24 December 1869
Candidate	Votes	%
Thomas Dangar (re-elected)	369	83.1
Edward Sharp	75	16.9
Total formal votes	444	97.4
Informal votes	12	2.6
Turnout	456	29.5

==== 1865 by-election ====
1865 Gwydir by-election Thursday 29 June and Thursday 20 July
Candidate	Votes	%
Thomas Dangar (re-elected)	246	59.7
John Single	165	40.0
Thomas Dangar Sr (Note: The proposer intended to refer to Thomas Gordon Gibbons Dangar but was not aware he had more than one name and the nomination was recorded as being of his step father Thomas Dangar Sr, the former member for the Upper Hunter.)	1	0.2
Total formal votes	412	100.0
Informal votes	0	0.0
Turnout	412	36.3

The election of Thomas Dangar was declared void by the Committee of Elections and Qualifications because he had a contract to carry mail, which was an office of profit under the Crown.

==== 1865 ====
1864–65 New South Wales colonial election: The Gwydir Tuesday 24 January 1865
Candidate	Votes	%
Thomas Dangar (elected)	145	52.2
John Single	92	33.1
Francis Rusden (defeated)	41	14.8
Total formal votes	278	100.0
Informal votes	0	0.0
Turnout	278	29.5

==== 1860 ====
1860 New South Wales colonial election: The Gwydir Wednesday 19 December
Candidate	Votes	%
Francis Rusden (elected)	38	59.4
Richard Jenkins (defeated)	26	40.6
Total formal votes	64	100.0
Informal votes	0	0.0
Turnout	64	10.6

=== Elections in the 1850s ===
==== 1859 ====
1859 New South Wales colonial election: The Gwydir Thursday 7 July
Candidate	Votes	%
Richard Jenkins (re-elected)	unopposed	
