= Electoral results for the Division of Gwydir =

Results for federal seat of Gwydir, New South Wales, Australia

This is a list of electoral results for the Division of Gwydir in Australian federal elections from the division's creation in 1901 until its abolition in 2007.

== Members ==
Member	Party	Term
George Cruickshank	Protectionist	1901—1903
William Webster	Labor	1903—1916
William Webster	Nationalist	1916—1919
Lou Cunningham	Labor	1919—1925
Aubrey Abbott	Country	1925—1929
Lou Cunningham	Labor	1929—1931
Aubrey Abbott	Country	1931—1937
William Scully	Labor	1937 by—1949
Thomas Treloar	Country	1949—1953
Ian Allan	Country	1953 by—1969
Ralph Hunt	Country, National	1969 by—1989
John Anderson	National	1989 by—2007

== Election results ==
=== Elections in the 2000s ===
==== 2004 ====
2004 Australian federal election: Gwydir
Party	Candidate	Votes	%	±%
National	John Anderson	46,951	61.95	+9.32
Labor	Glenn Sims	17,396	22.95	+0.30
Independent	Bruce Haigh	3,797	5.01	−1.03
One Nation	Colin Rogers	3,441	4.54	−5.50
Greens	Michael Anderson	3,399	4.48	+2.76
Citizens Electoral Council	Richard Stringer	808	1.07	−0.49
Total formal votes		75,792	96.40	+0.93
Informal votes		2,830	3.60	−0.93
Turnout		78,622	95.15	+0.03
Two-party-preferred result
National	John Anderson	51,835	68.39	+3.51
Labor	Glenn Sims	23,957	31.61	−3.51
National hold		Swing	+3.51	

==== 2001 ====
2001 Australian federal election: Gwydir
Party	Candidate	Votes	%	±%
National	John Anderson	40,437	52.63	+11.15
Labor	Anne Murnain	17,402	22.65	−5.71
One Nation	Colin Rogers	7,716	10.04	−9.10
Independent	Bruce Haigh	4,637	6.04	+6.04
Greens	Neil Strachan	1,324	1.72	+1.52
Independent	Bevan O'Regan	1,289	1.68	+1.68
Democrats	Ken Graham	1,242	1.62	−0.83
Citizens Electoral Council	Richard Witten	1,197	1.56	+1.48
Lower Excise Fuel	Harry Weber	1,194	1.55	+1.55
Independent	Gary Edwards	389	0.51	−0.32
Total formal votes		76,827	95.52	−0.51
Informal votes		3,603	4.48	+0.51
Turnout		80,430	95.54	
Two-party-preferred result
National	John Anderson	49,844	64.88	+2.88
Labor	Anne Murnain	26,983	35.12	−2.88
National hold		Swing	+2.88	

=== Elections in the 1990s ===
==== 1998 ====
1998 Australian federal election: Gwydir
Party	Candidate	Votes	%	±%
National	John Anderson	30,829	46.14	−16.18
Labor	Anne Murnain	17,773	26.60	−1.67
One Nation	Bob Johns	13,875	20.77	+20.77
Democrats	Ken Graham	1,624	2.43	−2.79
Christian Democrats	Derrick Paxton	1,106	1.66	+1.66
Independent	Jim Perrett	856	1.28	−2.90
Independent	Gary Edwards	747	1.12	+1.12
Total formal votes		66,810	96.05	−1.40
Informal votes		2,745	3.95	+1.40
Turnout		69,555	95.37	−1.34
Two-party-preferred result
National	John Anderson	42,480	63.58	−4.93
Labor	Anne Murnain	24,330	36.42	+4.93
National hold		Swing	−4.93	

==== 1996 ====
1996 Australian federal election: Gwydir
Party	Candidate	Votes	%	±%
National	John Anderson	43,385	62.32	+5.19
Labor	John Curley	19,680	28.27	−9.28
Democrats	Anne Graham	3,634	5.22	+5.22
Independent	Jim Perrett	2,914	4.19	+4.19
Total formal votes		69,613	97.46	+0.17
Informal votes		1,817	2.54	−0.17
Turnout		71,430	96.72	+0.67
Two-party-preferred result
National	John Anderson	47,552	68.51	+8.24
Labor	John Curley	21,856	31.49	−8.24
National hold		Swing	+8.24	

==== 1993 ====
1993 Australian federal election: Gwydir
Party	Candidate	Votes	%	±%
National	John Anderson	40,950	57.13	+8.47
Labor	Ted Stubbins	26,916	37.55	+3.37
Confederate Action	Jim Perrett	3,809	5.31	+5.31
Total formal votes		71,675	97.29	−0.27
Informal votes		1,999	2.71	+0.27
Turnout		73,674	96.05	
Two-party-preferred result
National	John Anderson	43,147	60.27	+0.05
Labor	Ted Stubbins	28,442	39.73	−0.05
National hold		Swing	+0.05	

==== 1990 ====
1990 Australian federal election: Gwydir
Party	Candidate	Votes	%	±%
National	John Anderson	33,449	51.8	−5.4
Labor	Ted Stubbins	21,553	33.4	−3.5
Independent	Bevan O'Regan	5,661	8.8	+8.8
Democrats	Anthony Styles	3,956	6.1	+6.1
Total formal votes		64,619	97.6	
Informal votes		1,581	2.4	
Turnout		66,200	96.1	
Two-party-preferred result
National	John Anderson	39,425	61.2	+0.9
Labor	Ted Stubbins	24,984	38.8	−0.9
National hold		Swing	+0.9	

=== Elections in the 1980s ===
==== 1989 by-election ====
1989 Gwydir by-election
Party	Candidate	Votes	%	±%
National	John Anderson	31,209	56.0	−1.2
Independent	John Uebergang	14,660	26.3	+26.3
Independent	Bevan O'Regan	9,881	17.7	+17.7
Total formal votes		55,750	95.3	
Informal votes		2,768	4.7	
Turnout		58,518	84.0	
Two-candidate-preferred result
National	John Anderson		60.4 (Note: The Australian Electoral Commission has no record of the distribution of preferences for this by-election, despite the fact that a full distribution was required by the Electoral Act. Adam Carr estimates a majority of 60.4% for Anderson, assuming 75% of O'Regan's preferences went to Uebergang.)	
Independent	John Uebergang		39.6	
National hold		Swing	N/A	

==== 1987 ====
1987 Australian federal election: Gwydir
Party	Candidate	Votes	%	±%
National	Ralph Hunt	35,934	57.2	+2.5
Labor	Trevor Elks	23,200	36.9	−3.7
Independent	Lloyd Fleming	3,695	5.9	+5.9
Total formal votes		62,829	96.5	
Informal votes		2,287	3.5	
Turnout		65,116	94.8	
Two-party-preferred result
National	Ralph Hunt	37,871	60.3	+3.0
Labor	Trevor Elks	24,958	39.7	−3.0
National hold		Swing	+3.0	

==== 1984 ====
1984 Australian federal election: Gwydir
Party	Candidate	Votes	%	±%
National	Ralph Hunt	33,988	54.7	−1.2
Labor	Pamela Smith	25,271	40.6	+4.1
Democrats	Lyall Munro Jnr	1,958	3.1	−2.3
Independent	John Brazier	968	1.6	+1.6
Total formal votes		62,185	96.4	
Informal votes		2,331	3.6	
Turnout		64,516	94.5	
Two-party-preferred result
National	Ralph Hunt	35,634	57.3	−2.6
Labor	Pamela Smith	26,587	42.7	+2.6
National hold		Swing	−2.6	

==== 1983 ====
1983 Australian federal election: Gwydir
Party	Candidate	Votes	%	±%
National	Ralph Hunt	38,839	57.0	−1.4
Labor	Robert Hamilton	25,585	37.6	+2.1
Democrats	Gloria Collison	3,711	5.4	−0.6
Total formal votes		68,135	98.7	
Informal votes		932	1.3	
Turnout		69,067	94.5	
Two-party-preferred result
National	Ralph Hunt		58.8	−1.6
Labor	Robert Hamilton		41.2	+1.6
National hold		Swing	−1.6	

==== 1980 ====
1980 Australian federal election: Gwydir
Party	Candidate	Votes	%	±%
National Country	Ralph Hunt	38,796	58.4	−0.6
Labor	Robert Hamilton	23,589	35.5	+2.8
Democrats	Gloria Collison	4,004	6.0	+1.5
Total formal votes		66,389	98.5	
Informal votes		1,041	1.5	
Turnout		67,430	94.3	
Two-party-preferred result
National Country	Ralph Hunt		60.4	−2.9
Labor	Robert Hamilton		39.6	+2.9
National Country hold		Swing	−2.9	

=== Elections in the 1970s ===
==== 1977 ====
1977 Australian federal election: Gwydir
Party	Candidate	Votes	%	±%
National Country	Ralph Hunt	37,600	59.0	+0.2
Labor	Francis Fish	20,831	32.7	−7.0
Democrats	Heather Howe	2,866	4.5	+4.5
Progress	Brian Allen	1,743	2.7	+2.7
Independent	Lyall Munro	654	1.0	+1.0
Total formal votes		63,694	97.9	
Informal votes		1,362	2.1	
Turnout		65,056	95.8	
Two-party-preferred result
National Country	Ralph Hunt		63.3	+3.0
Labor	Francis Fish		36.7	−3.0
National Country hold		Swing	+3.0	

==== 1975 ====
1975 Australian federal election: Gwydir
Party	Candidate	Votes	%	±%
National Country	Ralph Hunt	31,779	62.0	+4.0
Labor	Francis Bourke	18,686	36.5	−4.1
Independent	Norbert Hennessy	449	0.9	+0.9
Independent	William O'Donnell	331	0.6	+0.6
Total formal votes		51,245	98.3	
Informal votes		893	1.7	
Turnout		52,138	96.3	
Two-party-preferred result
National Country	Ralph Hunt		63.5	+4.9
Labor	Francis Bourke		36.5	−4.9
National Country hold		Swing	+4.9	

==== 1974 ====
1974 Australian federal election: Gwydir
Party	Candidate	Votes	%	±%
Country	Ralph Hunt	28,892	58.0	+7.8
Labor	Francis Bourke	20,249	40.6	−2.8
Australia	James Thompson	689	1.4	−1.0
Total formal votes		49,830	98.8	
Informal votes		602	1.2	
Turnout		50,432	96.1	
Two-party-preferred result
Country	Ralph Hunt		58.6	+4.4
Labor	Francis Bourke		41.4	−4.4
Country hold		Swing	+4.4	

==== 1972 ====
1972 Australian federal election: Gwydir
Party	Candidate	Votes	%	±%
Country	Ralph Hunt	22,979	50.2	+0.2
Labor	Robert Downing	19,896	43.4	−0.9
Democratic Labor	John Gough	1,532	3.3	+3.3
Australia	Kevin Mapperson	1,083	2.4	−2.0
Independent	William O'Donnell	324	0.7	+0.7
Total formal votes		45,814	98.1	
Informal votes		865	1.9	
Turnout		46,679	96.0	
Two-party-preferred result
Country	Ralph Hunt		54.2	+1.2
Labor	Robert Downing		45.8	−1.2
Country hold		Swing	+1.2	

=== Elections in the 1960s ===
==== 1969 ====
1969 Australian federal election: Gwydir
Party	Candidate	Votes	%	±%
Country	Ralph Hunt	22,735	50.0	−11.1
Labor	Roger Nott	20,143	44.3	+5.4
Australia	Brian Edwards	2,014	4.4	+4.4
Independent	Halwyn Webster	546	1.2	+1.2
Total formal votes		45,438	98.7	
Informal votes		619	1.3	
Turnout		46,057	95.7	
Two-party-preferred result
Country	Ralph Hunt		53.0	−8.1
Labor	Roger Nott		47.0	+8.1
Country hold		Swing	−8.1	

==== 1969 by-election ====
Gwydir by-election, 1969
Party	Candidate	Votes	%	±%
Country	Ralph Hunt	21,113	53.6	−7.7
Labor	Roger Nott	18,293	46.4	+7.7
Total formal votes		39,406	99.0	
Informal votes		394	1.0	
Turnout		39,800	88.2	
Country hold		Swing	−7.7	

==== 1966 ====
1966 Australian federal election: Gwydir
Party	Candidate	Votes	%	±%
Country	Ian Allan	25,184	61.3	+6.3
Labor	Reginald Lang	15,895	38.7	−6.3
Total formal votes		41,079	98.2	
Informal votes		740	1.8	
Turnout		41,819	94.7	
Country hold		Swing	+6.3	

==== 1963 ====
1963 Australian federal election: Gwydir
Party	Candidate	Votes	%	±%
Country	Ian Allan	22,477	55.0	+4.9
Labor	Kenneth Green	18,373	45.0	−0.1
Total formal votes		40,850	99.2	
Informal votes		311	0.8	
Turnout		41,161	94.9	
Country hold		Swing	+1.1	

==== 1961 ====
1961 Australian federal election: Gwydir
Party	Candidate	Votes	%	±%
Country	Ian Allan	19,845	50.1	−4.9
Labor	Austin Heffernan	17,836	45.1	+0.1
Democratic Labor	Stanley Parmenter	1,901	4.8	+4.8
Total formal votes		39,582	98.4	
Informal votes		642	1.6	
Turnout		40,224	95.4	
Two-party-preferred result
Country	Ian Allan		53.9	−1.1
Labor	Austin Heffernan		46.1	+1.1
Country hold		Swing	−1.1	

=== Elections in the 1950s ===
==== 1958 ====
1958 Australian federal election: Gwydir
Party	Candidate	Votes	%	±%
Country	Ian Allan	21,304	55.0	−2.9
Labor	Austin Heffernan	17,414	45.0	+2.9
Total formal votes		38,718	98.4	
Informal votes		640	1.6	
Turnout		39,358	94.9	
Country hold		Swing	−2.9	

==== 1955 ====
1955 Australian federal election: Gwydir
Party	Candidate	Votes	%	±%
Country	Ian Allan	22,271	57.9	+5.0
Labor	Austin Heffernan	16,162	42.1	−5.0
Total formal votes		38,433	98.2	
Informal votes		700	1.8	
Turnout		39,133	94.9	
Country hold		Swing	+5.0	

==== 1954 ====
1954 Australian federal election: Gwydir
Party	Candidate	Votes	%	±%
Country	Ian Allan	20,101	53.1	−0.1
Labor	Michael Quinn	17,731	46.9	+0.1
Total formal votes		37,832	99.3	
Informal votes		264	0.7	
Turnout		38,096	95.7	
Country hold		Swing	−0.1	

==== 1953 by-election ====
Gwydir by-election, 1953
Party	Candidate	Votes	%	±%
Labor	Michael Quinn	15,784	45.3	−1.5
Country	Ian Allan	9,823	28.2	−8.8
Country	Thelma Kirkby	5,649	16.2	+16.2
Liberal	Arthur Howard	3,584	10.3	+10.3
Total formal votes		34,840	98.6	
Informal votes		480	1.4	
Turnout		35,320	89.2	
Two-party-preferred result
Country	Ian Allan	18,409	52.8	−0.4
Labor	Michael Quinn	16,431	47.2	+0.4
Country hold		Swing	−0.4	

==== 1951 ====
1951 Australian federal election: Gwydir
Party	Candidate	Votes	%	±%
Country	Thomas Treloar	19,460	53.2	−1.9
Labor	Norman Ferguson	17,147	46.8	+1.9
Total formal votes		36,607	98.9	
Informal votes		408	1.1	
Turnout		37,015	95.5	
Country hold		Swing	−1.9	

=== Elections in the 1940s ===
==== 1949 ====
1949 Australian federal election: Gwydir
Party	Candidate	Votes	%	±%
Country	Thomas Treloar	20,018	55.1	+17.4
Labor	William Scully	16,282	44.9	−3.5
Total formal votes		36,300	99.1	
Informal votes		346	0.9	
Turnout		36,646	95.8	
Country gain from Labor		Swing	+9.2	

==== 1946 ====
1946 Australian federal election: Gwydir
Party	Candidate	Votes	%	±%
Labor	William Scully	22,434	48.7	−10.8
Country	Thomas Treloar	16,513	35.4	+5.4
Protestant People	William Campbell	2,661	5.8	+5.8
Liberal	Thomas Mort	1,689	3.7	+3.7
Independent Country	Ben Wade	1,350	2.9	+2.9
Services	Tom Carmody	914	2.0	+2.0
Independent	George McDonald	381	0.8	+0.8
Independent	Kevin Nott	322	0.7	+0.7
Total formal votes		46,064	95.7	
Informal votes		2,054	4.3	
Turnout		48,118	92.6	
Two-party-preferred result
Labor	William Scully		51.2	−12.5
Country	Thomas Treloar		48.8	+12.5
Labor hold		Swing	−12.5	

==== 1943 ====
1943 Australian federal election: Gwydir
Party	Candidate	Votes	%	±%
Labor	William Scully	28,404	59.5	+4.1
Country	Colin Gale	14,320	30.0	−13.0
Independent	Edmund Daniel	3,985	8.3	+8.3
One Parliament	William Mills	1,027	2.2	+2.2
Total formal votes		47,736	98.6	
Informal votes		684	1.4	
Turnout		48,420	95.0	
Two-party-preferred result
Labor	William Scully		63.7	+4.9
Country	Colin Gale		36.3	−4.9
Labor hold		Swing	+4.9	

==== 1940 ====
1940 Australian federal election: Gwydir
Party	Candidate	Votes	%	±%
Labor	William Scully	27,231	55.4	+3.0
Country	Ben Wade	13,373	27.2	−4.6
Country	Ernest Batchelor	7,738	15.8	+15.8
Independent	Frederick Deakins	788	1.6	+1.6
Total formal votes		49,130	98.2	
Informal votes		881	1.8	
Turnout		50,011	92.2	
Two-party-preferred result
Labor	William Scully		58.8	+6.4
Country	Ben Wade		41.2	−6.4
Labor hold		Swing	+6.4	

=== Elections in the 1930s ===
==== 1937 ====
1937 Australian federal election: Gwydir
Party	Candidate	Votes	%	±%
Labor	William Scully	27,140	52.4	+44.3
Country	Ernest Batchelor	24,679	47.6	−4.9
Total formal votes		51,819	98.9	
Informal votes		601	1.1	
Turnout		52,420	96.8	
Labor hold		Swing	+6.9	

==== 1937 by-election ====
Gwydir by-election, 1937
Party	Candidate	Votes	%	±%
Labor	William Scully	25,551	52.3	+44.2
Country	Ernest Batchelor	13,168	27.0	−4.8
Country	Oliver Milling	8,155	16.7	+16.7
Country	Geoffrey Moore	1,963	4.0	+4.0
Total formal votes		48,837	98.7	
Informal votes		639	1.3	
Turnout		49,476	90.3	
Two-party-preferred result
Labor	William Scully		54.3	+54.3
Country	Ernest Batchelor		45.7	−8.8
Labor gain from Country		Swing	+8.8	

==== 1934 ====
1934 Australian federal election: Gwydir
Party	Candidate	Votes	%	±%
Country	Aubrey Abbott	26,229	52.5	−5.7
Labor (NSW)	Edward Cummins	19,682	39.4	+28.3
Labor	Arthur Griffith	4,030	8.1	−25.7
Total formal votes		49,941	98.1	
Informal votes		984	1.9	
Turnout		50,925	95.3	
Two-party-preferred result
Country	Aubrey Abbott		54.5	−8.2
Labor (NSW)	Edward Cummins		45.5	+45.5
Country hold		Swing	−8.2	

==== 1931 ====
1931 Australian federal election: Gwydir
Party	Candidate	Votes	%	±%
Country	Aubrey Abbott	18,321	45.6	+9.0
Labor	Lou Cunningham	9,995	24.9	−28.8
Labor (NSW)	Edward Cummins	7,931	19.8	+19.8
Country	Arnold Brown	3,900	9.7	+9.7
Total formal votes		40,147	96.6	
Informal votes		1,419	3.4	
Turnout		41,566	93.7	
Two-party-preferred result
Country	Aubrey Abbott		59.8	+13.5
Labor	Lou Cunningham		40.2	−13.5
Country gain from Labor		Swing	+13.5	

=== Elections in the 1920s ===
==== 1929 ====
1929 Australian federal election: Gwydir
Party	Candidate	Votes	%	±%
Labor	Lou Cunningham	20,873	53.7	+6.0
Country	Aubrey Abbott	18,014	46.3	−6.0
Total formal votes		38,887	97.9	
Informal votes		831	2.1	
Turnout		39,718	92.7	
Labor gain from Country		Swing	+6.0	

==== 1928 ====
1928 Australian federal election: Gwydir
Party	Candidate	Votes	%	±%
Country	Aubrey Abbott	18,959	52.3	+21.5
Labor	Lou Cunningham	17,266	47.7	+2.2
Total formal votes		36,225	95.2	
Informal votes		1,811	4.8	
Turnout		38,036	92.1	
Country hold		Swing	−0.8	

==== 1925 ====
1925 Australian federal election: Gwydir
Party	Candidate	Votes	%	±%
Labor	Lou Cunningham	15,531	45.5	−0.8
Country	Aubrey Abbott	10,509	30.8	−5.6
Nationalist	Joseph McGowan	8,080	23.7	+6.4
Total formal votes		34,120	97.5	
Informal votes		881	2.5	
Turnout		35,001	88.1	
Two-party-preferred result
Country	Aubrey Abbott	18,124	53.1	+3.2
Labor	Lou Cunningham	15,996	46.9	−3.2
Country gain from Labor		Swing	+3.2	

==== 1922 ====
1922 Australian federal election: Gwydir
Party	Candidate	Votes	%	±%
Labor	Lou Cunningham	11,056	46.3	−5.5
Country	Gordon Wilkins	8,688	36.4	+36.4
Nationalist	William Ashford	4,121	17.3	−24.3
Total formal votes		23,865	96.1	
Informal votes		972	3.9	
Turnout		24,837	64.1	
Two-party-preferred result
Labor	Lou Cunningham	11,951	50.1	−5.0
Country	Gordon Wilkins	11,914	49.9	+5.0
Labor hold		Swing	−5.0	

=== Elections in the 1910s ===
==== 1919 ====
1919 Australian federal election: Gwydir
Party	Candidate	Votes	%	±%
Labor	Lou Cunningham	10,333	49.1	+5.6
Nationalist	William Webster	8,699	41.4	−15.1
Independent	James Bell	1,992	9.5	+9.5
Total formal votes		21,024	93.4	
Informal votes		1,477	6.6	
Turnout		22,501	69.4	
Two-party-preferred result
Labor	Lou Cunningham	11,183	53.2	+9.7
Nationalist	William Webster	9,841	46.8	−9.7
Labor gain from Nationalist		Swing	+9.7	

==== 1917 ====
1917 Australian federal election: Gwydir
Party	Candidate	Votes	%	±%
Nationalist	William Webster	13,275	56.5	+10.3
Labor	Cecil Last	10,239	43.5	−10.3
Total formal votes		23,514	96.8	
Informal votes		781	3.2	
Turnout		24,295	69.4	
Nationalist gain from Labor		Swing	+10.3	

==== 1914 ====
1914 Australian federal election: Gwydir
Party	Candidate	Votes	%	±%
Labor	William Webster	13,560	53.8	+1.6
Liberal	John Blackney	11,658	46.2	−1.6
Total formal votes		25,218	97.2	
Informal votes		719	2.8	
Turnout		25,937	73.3	
Labor hold		Swing	+1.6	

==== 1913 ====
1913 Australian federal election: Gwydir
Party	Candidate	Votes	%	±%
Labor	William Webster	11,296	52.2	−7.3
Liberal	John Blackney	10,348	47.8	+7.3
Total formal votes		21,644	96.2	
Informal votes		851	3.8	
Turnout		22,495	62.2	
Labor hold		Swing	−7.3	

==== 1910 ====
1910 Australian federal election: Gwydir
Party	Candidate	Votes	%	±%
Labour	William Webster	10,729	59.6	+6.3
Liberal	Robert Patten	7,160	40.4	−6.3
Total formal votes		17,729	98.3	
Informal votes		311	1.7	
Turnout		18,040	59.9	
Labour hold		Swing	+6.3	

=== Elections in the 1900s ===
==== 1906 ====
1906 Australian federal election: Gwydir
Party	Candidate	Votes	%	±%
Labour	William Webster	7,118	53.3	−0.2
Anti-Socialist	Thomas Cunningham	6,246	46.7	+16.0
Total formal votes		13,364	96.8	
Informal votes		442	3.2	
Turnout		13,806	53.6	
Labour hold		Swing	−8.1	

==== 1903 ====
1903 Australian federal election: Gwydir
Party	Candidate	Votes	%	±%
Labour	William Webster	4,395	53.5	+24.4
Free Trade	James Macarthur-Onslow	2,522	30.7	+17.1
Ind. Protectionist	Robert Barton	1,302	15.8	+15.8
Total formal votes		8,219	95.0	
Informal votes		431	5.0	
Turnout		8,650	38.7	
Labour gain from Protectionist		Swing	+24.3	

==== 1901 ====
1901 Australian federal election: Gwydir
Party	Candidate	Votes	%	±%
Protectionist	George Cruickshank	3,522	54.9	+54.9
Labour	William Webster	1,869	29.1	+29.1
Free Trade	Edward Foxall	871	13.6	+13.6
Ind. Free Trade	William Buchanan	157	2.4	+2.4
Total formal votes		6,419	97.6	
Informal votes		156	2.4	
Turnout		6,575	50.6	
Protectionist win		(new seat)		
