= Electoral results for the district of Inverell =

Election results for Inverell, New South Wales, Australia

Inverell an electoral district of the Legislative Assembly in the Australian state of New South Wales was created in 1859 and abolished in 1894.

| Election | Member | Party |
|---|---|---|
| 1880 | Richard Murray | None |
| 1882 | Richard Murray | None |
| 1885 | Samuel Moore | None |
| 1887 | Samuel Moore | Free Trade |
| 1889 | George Cruickshank | Protectionist |
| 1891 | George Cruickshank | Protectionist |
| 1894 | George Cruickshank | Protectionist |
| 1895 | George Cruickshank | Protectionist |
| 1898 | George Cruickshank | Protectionist |
| 1901 | William McIntyre | Progressive |
| 1902 by | George Jones | Labour |

== Election results ==
=== Elections in the 1900s ===
==== 1902 by-election ====
1902 Inverell by-election Saturday 31 May
| Party | Candidate | Votes | % | ±% |
|---|---|---|---|---|
| Labour | George Jones | 471 | 37.7 | |
| Progressive | James McIlveen | 447 | 35.8 | |
| Independent | William Wall | 331 | 26.5 | |
| Total formal votes | | 1,249 | 99.5 | |
| Informal votes | | 6 | 0.5 | |
| Turnout | | 1,255 | 50.7 (Note: Estimate based on an electoral roll of 2,477 at the 1901 election.) | |
| Labour gain from Progressive | | | | |

William McIntyre (Progressive) died.

==== 1901 ====
1901 New South Wales state election: Inverell
| Party | Candidate | Votes | % | ±% |
|---|---|---|---|---|
| Progressive | William McIntyre | 750 | 55.6 | −37.1 |
| Ind. Progressive | James McIlveen | 599 | 44.4 | |
| Total formal votes | | 1,349 | 100.0 | +1.3 |
| Informal votes | | 0 | 0.0 | −1.3 |
| Turnout | | 1,349 | 54.5 | +20.93 |
| Progressive hold | | | | |

The sitting member was George Cruickshank (Progressive) who did not contest the election as he had been elected in March 1901 to the federal seat of Gwydir.

=== Elections in the 1890s ===
==== 1898 ====
1898 New South Wales colonial election: Inverell
| Party | Candidate | Votes | % | ±% |
|---|---|---|---|---|
| National Federal | George Cruickshank | 567 | 92.7 | |
| Independent | Thomas Jones | 45 | 7.4 | |
| Total formal votes | | 612 | 98.7 | |
| Informal votes | | 8 | 1.3 | |
| Turnout | | 620 | 33.5 | |
| National Federal hold | | | | |

==== 1895 ====
1895 New South Wales colonial election: Inverell
| Party | Candidate | Votes | % | ±% |
|---|---|---|---|---|
| Protectionist | George Cruickshank | 717 | 79.3 | |
| Labour | Philip Moses | 174 | 19.3 | |
| Independent Labour | Thomas Jones | 7 | 0.8 | |
| Independent | F Webster | 6 | 0.7 | |
| Total formal votes | | 904 | 97.5 | |
| Informal votes | | 23 | 2.5 | |
| Turnout | | 927 | 55.4 | |
| Protectionist hold | | | | |

==== 1894 ====
1894 New South Wales colonial election: Inverell
| Party | Candidate | Votes | % | ±% |
|---|---|---|---|---|
| Protectionist | George Cruickshank | unopposed | | |
| Protectionist hold | | | | |

==== 1891 ====
1891 New South Wales colonial election: Inverell Saturday, 20 June
| Party | Candidate | Votes | % | ±% |
|---|---|---|---|---|
| Protectionist | George Cruickshank | unopposed | | |
| Protectionist hold | | | | |

=== Elections in the 1880s ===
==== 1889 ====
1889 New South Wales colonial election: Inverell Saturday 9 February
| Party | Candidate | Votes | % | ±% |
|---|---|---|---|---|
| Protectionist | George Cruickshank (elected) | 847 | 65.0 | |
| Free Trade | Alexander Riddel | 456 | 35.0 | |
| Total formal votes | | 1,303 | 98.4 | |
| Informal votes | | 21 | 1.6 | |
| Turnout | | 1,324 | 56.7 | |
| Protectionist gain from Free Trade | | | | |

The sitting member Samuel Moore (Free Trade) did not contest the election.

==== 1887 ====
1887 New South Wales colonial election: Inverell Saturday 19 February
| Party | Candidate | Votes | % | ±% |
|---|---|---|---|---|
| Free Trade | Samuel Moore (re-elected) | 763 | 60.1 | |
| Protectionist | George Cruickshank | 507 | 39.9 | |
| Total formal votes | | 1,270 | 98.4 | |
| Informal votes | | 21 | 1.6 | |
| Turnout | | 1,291 | 63.0 | |

==== 1885 ====
1885 New South Wales colonial election: Inverell Monday 19 October
| Candidate | Votes | % |
|---|---|---|
| Samuel Moore (elected) | 666 | 57.9 |
| Richard Murray (defeated) | 484 | 42.1 |
| Total formal votes | 1,150 | 96.9 |
| Informal votes | 37 | 3.1 |
| Turnout | 1,187 | 64.6 |

==== 1882 ====
1882 New South Wales colonial election: Inverell Saturday 9 December
| Candidate | Votes | % |
|---|---|---|
| Richard Murray (re-elected) | 566 | 57.3 |
| Thomas Mayne | 352 | 35.6 |
| Thomas Jones | 70 | 7.1 |
| Total formal votes | 988 | 97.2 |
| Informal votes | 29 | 2.9 |
| Turnout | 1,017 | 57.2 |

==== 1880 ====
1880 New South Wales colonial election: Inverell Monday 29 November
| Candidate | Votes | % |
|---|---|---|
| Richard Murray (elected) | 561 | 54.3 |
| G R Maclean | 472 | 45.7 |
| Total formal votes | 1,033 | 96.5 |
| Informal votes | 37 | 3.5 |
| Turnout | 1,070 | 60.0 |
| | (new seat) | |
