= Electoral results for the district of Moree =

Election results for Moree, New South Wales, Australia

Moree, an electoral district of the Legislative Assembly in the Australian state of New South Wales was created in 1894 and abolished in 1904

Election	Member	Party
1894	Thomas Hassall	Protectionist
1895	Thomas Hassall	Protectionist
1898	Thomas Hassall	National Federal
1901	William Webster	Labour
1903 by	Percy Stirton	Liberal Reform

== Election results ==
=== Elections in the 1900s ===
==== 1903 by-election ====
1903 Moree by-election Saturday 12 December
Party	Candidate	Votes	%	±%
Liberal Reform	Percy Stirton	689	61.0	
Independent Liberal	Alfredo Zlotkowski	440	39.0	
Total formal votes		1,129	98.7	−1.3
Informal votes		15	1.3	+1.3
Turnout		1,144	39.8 (Note: Estimate based on a roll of 2,875 at the 1901 election.)	−18.2
Liberal Reform gain from Labour		Swing		

William Webster (Labour) resigned to successfully contest the federal seat of Gwydir. Leonard Court (Labour) was not nominated in time.

==== 1901 ====
1901 New South Wales state election: Moree
Party	Candidate	Votes	%	±%
Labour	William Webster	877	52.6	
Progressive	John Crane	789	47.4	−22.1
Total formal votes		1,666	100.0	+0.6
Informal votes		0	0.0	−0.6
Turnout		1,666	58.0	+8.3
Labour gain from Progressive				

The sitting member was Thomas Hassall (Progressive) who did not contest the election.

=== Elections in the 1890s ===
==== 1898 ====
1898 New South Wales colonial election: Moree
Party	Candidate	Votes	%	±%
National Federal	Thomas Hassall	675	69.4	
Free Trade	Henry Joseph	297	30.6	
Total formal votes		972	99.4	
Informal votes		6	0.6	
Turnout		978	49.6	
National Federal hold				

==== 1895 ====
1895 New South Wales colonial election: Moree
Party	Candidate	Votes	%	±%
Protectionist	Thomas Hassall	546	58.1	
Independent Labour	Robert Buist	394	41.9	
Total formal votes		940	99.4	
Informal votes		6	0.6	
Turnout		946	58.1	
Protectionist hold				

==== 1894 ====
1894 New South Wales colonial election: Moree
Party	Candidate	Votes	%	±%
Protectionist	Thomas Hassall	668	55.5	
Independent Labour	L Mouatt	490	40.7	
Ind. Free Trade	J Halse	24	2.0	
Free Trade	T Vyner	21	1.8	
Total formal votes		1,203	98.1	
Informal votes		23	1.9	
Turnout		1,226	76.7	
Protectionist win		(new seat)		
