= 1903 Moree state by-election =

- 12 December 1903

Electoral district of Drummoyne in the New South Wales Legislative Assembly
- Registered: 12,875 (Note: Estimate based on a roll of 2,875 at the 1901 election.)
- Turnout: 39.79% (▼18.16)
	First party	Second party
	LRP	IND
Candidate	Percy Stirton	Alfredo Zlotkowski
Party	Liberal Reform	Ind. Liberal
Popular vote	689	440
Percentage	61.03%	38.97%
Swing	▲61.03	▲38.97
MP before election
William Webster
Labour
Elected MP
Percy Stirton
Liberal Reform

The 1903 Moree state by-election was held on 12 December 1903 to elect the member for Moree in the New South Wales Legislative Assembly, following the resignation of Labour Party MP William Webster, who contested the seat of Gwydir at the 1903 federal election.

Labour selected Matthew Boland as its candidate, but he withdrew because he felt "too nervous". Leonard Court was subsequently chosen as Boland's replacement, but he was not officially nominated in time, preventing Labour from contesting the seat.

Percy Stirton won the by-election for the Liberal Reform Party with 61% of the vote, defeating Independent Liberal candidate Alfredo Zlotkowski. This was the last contest for Moree, with the seat abolished in 1904 and largely replaced by a recreated state seat of Gwydir following the outcome of the 1903 New South Wales referendum that reduced the number of Legislative Assembly members.

== Key dates ==
- 18 November 1903 – William Webster resigns
- 19 November 1903 – Writ of election issued by the Speaker of the Legislative Assembly
- 30 November 1903 – Matthew Boland withdraws as Labour candidate
- 1 December 1903 – Candidate nominations
- 12 December 1903 – Polling day
- 16 December 1903 – Federal election
- 23 December 1903 – Return of writ

== Result ==
1903 Moree state by-election
Party	Candidate	Votes	%	±%
Liberal Reform	Percy Stirton	689	61.03	+61.03
Independent Liberal	Alfredo Zlotkowski	440	38.97	+38.97
Total formal votes		1,129	98.69	N/A
Informal votes		15	1.31	N/A
Turnout		1,144	39.79	−18.16
Liberal Reform gain from Labour				

== See also ==
- Electoral results for the district of Moree
- List of New South Wales state by-elections
