= 1886 Gwydir colonial by-election =

By-election in New South Wales, Australia

A by-election was held for the New South Wales Legislative Assembly electorate of Gwydir on 10 June 1886 because of the resignation of William Campbell.

== Dates ==
Date	Event
25 May 1886	William Campbell resigned
26 May 1886	Writ of election issued by the Speaker of the Legislative Assembly
4 June 1886	Nominations
10 June 1886	Polling day
22 June 1886	Return of writ

== Result ==
1886 Gwydir by-election Thursday 10 June
Candidate	Votes	%
Thomas Hassall (elected)	482	58.1
Thomas Mayne	211	25.5
James Wearne	136	16.4
Total formal votes	829	100.0
Informal votes	0	0.0
Turnout	829	38.1

== See also ==
- Electoral results for the district of Gwydir
- List of New South Wales state by-elections
