= 1902 Inverell state by-election =

Election result for Inverell, New South Wales, Australia

A by-election was held for the New South Wales Legislative Assembly electorate of Inverell on 31 May 1902 because of the death of William McIntyre (Progressive).

== Dates ==
Date	Event
4 May 1902	William McIntyre died.
7 May 1902	Writ of election issued by the Speaker of the Legislative Assembly.
20 May 1902	Nominations
31 May 1902	Polling day
12 June 1902	Return of writ

== Result ==
1902 Inverell by-election Saturday 31 May
Party	Candidate	Votes	%	±%
Labour	George Jones	471	37.7	
Progressive	James McIlveen	447	35.8	
Independent	William Wall	331	26.5	
Total formal votes		1,249	99.5	
Informal votes		6	0.5	
Turnout		1,255	50.7 (Note: Estimate based on an electoral roll of 2,477 at the 1901 election.)	
Labour gain from Progressive				

== See also ==
- Electoral results for the district of Inverell
- List of New South Wales state by-elections
