= 1937 Gwydir by-election =

Australian federal by-election

- 8 May 1937
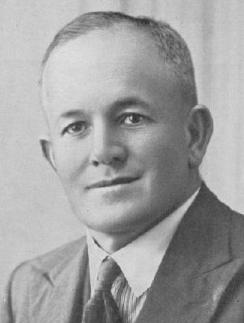
	First party	Second party	Third party
		CPA	CPA
Candidate	William Scully	Ernest Batchelor	Oliver Milling
Party	Labor	Country	Country
Popular vote	25,551	13,168	8,155
Percentage	52.3%	27.0%	16.7%
Swing	▲44.2pp	▼4.8pp	▲16.7pp
TPP	54.3%	45.7%
TPP swing	▲54.3pp	▼8.8pp
MP before election
Aubrey Abbott
Country
Elected MP
William Scully
Labor

A by-election was held for the Australian House of Representatives seat of Gwydir on 8 May 1937. This was triggered by the resignation of Country Party MP Aubrey Abbott to become Administrator of the Northern Territory.

The by-election was won by Labor candidate William Scully.

== Results ==
Gwydir by-election, 1937
Party	Candidate	Votes	%	±%
Labor	William Scully	25,551	52.3	+44.2
Country	Ernest Batchelor	13,168	27.0	−4.8
Country	Oliver Milling	8,155	16.7	+16.7
Country	Geoffrey Moore	1,963	4.0	+4.0
Total formal votes		48,837	98.7	
Informal votes		639	1.3	
Turnout		49,476	90.3	
Two-party-preferred result
Labor	William Scully		54.3	+54.3
Country	Ernest Batchelor		45.7	−8.8
Labor gain from Country		Swing	+8.8	
