= 1865 Gwydir colonial by-election =

By-election in New South Wales, Australia

A by-election was held for the New South Wales Legislative Assembly electorate of Gwydir on 29 June and 20 July 1865 as a result of the Committee on Elections and Qualifications declaring that the seat of Thomas Dangar was vacant because he had an office of profit under the Crown.

Dangar was elected at the 1865 election for the Gwydir in unusual circumstances. Dangar had been appointed the returning officer but was persuaded to stand for the seat, resulting in a delay of a month before the poll could be held. Dangar had a contract with the Government to carry the mail on the Barwon and Namoi rivers and this was held to be an office of profit and thus disqualified him from being a member of the Legislative Assembly.

== Dates ==
Date	Event
24 January 1865	Election for the Gwydir.
15 April 1865	Petition lodged by John Single.
25 April 1865	Petition referred to the Committee on Elections and Qualifications.
25 May 1865	The Committee on Elections and Qualifications declared that the election of Thomas Dangar was null and void.
27 May 1865	Writ of election issued by the Speaker of the Legislative Assembly.
15 June 1865	Nominations at Wee Waa.
29 June 1865	Polling day
28 July 1865	Return of writ

== Polling places ==
- Wee Waa
- Warialda
- Bingera
- Moree
- "Millie Inn"
- Narrabri
- Muckerawa
- Breewarina
- Collymongool near Collarenebri
- Coonabarrabran
- Drilldool Reserve
- Walgett or Warrena Reserve.
- 4 additional polling places were added late
- Yetman
- Welbudunga near Calandoon
- Mogindie
- "Gideon's Inn" at Yarranbah.

Polling did not occur at the late added polling places until 20 July.

== Result ==
1865 Gwydir by-election Thursday 29 June and Thursday 20 July
Candidate	Votes	%
Thomas Dangar (re-elected)	246	59.7
John Single	165	40.0
Thomas Dangar Sr (Note: The proposer intended to refer to Thomas Gordon Gibbons Dangar but was not aware he had more than one name and the nomination was recorded as being of his step father Thomas Dangar Sr, the former member for the Upper Hunter.)	1	0.2
Total formal votes	412	100.0
Informal votes	0	0.0
Turnout	412	36.3

It was a comfortable victory for Dangar, with his margin over Single increasing from 53 votes to 81 votes.

== See also ==
- Electoral results for the district of Gwydir
- List of New South Wales state by-elections
