= Edward Henry Lloyd =

English-born Australian politician

Edward Henry Lloyd (1825 – 21 December 1889) was an English-born Australian politician.

Edward was born at Acton Round in Shropshire to army officer John Lloyd and Mary Evans. Around 1849 he migrated to New South Wales, purchasing land on the Liverpool Plains in partnership with his brothers. Around 1855 he married Elizabeth Johnstone, with whom he had four children. In 1858 he was elected to the New South Wales Legislative Assembly for Liverpool Plains and Gwydir, but he retired in 1859. In 1863 he was appointed to the New South Wales Legislative Council, serving until 1865. Lloyd died in Sydney in 1889.

New South Wales Legislative Assembly
Preceded by Gideon Lang; Francis Rusden	Member for Liverpool Plains and Gwydir; 1858–1859; Served alongside: Richard Jenkins	Abolished
