= Electoral district of Liverpool Plains and Gwydir =

State electoral district of New South Wales, Australia

Liverpool Plains and Gwydir was an electoral district of the Legislative Assembly in the Australian state of New South Wales, created in 1856 and covering what is now known as the North West Slopes region, including the Liverpool Plains (which includes Quirindi and Gunnedah) and the extensive pastoral district around the Gwydir River in the northwest of the state. It elected two members simultaneously.

In 1859, Liverpool Plains and Gwydir was divided into Liverpool Plains and Gwydir.

== Members for Liverpool Plains and Gwydir ==
Member	Party	Term	Member	Party	Term
Gideon Lang	None	1856–1857	Francis Rusden	None	1856–1857
Richard Jenkins	None	1858–1859	Edward Lloyd	None	1858–1859

== Election results ==
=== 1856 ===
1856 New South Wales colonial election: Liverpool Plains and Gwydir
Candidate	Votes	%
Gideon Lang (elected 1)	152	45.9
Francis Rusden (elected 2)	108	32.6
Augustus Morris	71	21.5
Total formal votes	331	100.0
Informal votes	0	0.0
Turnout	184	33.3

Polling was conducted on 16 April 1856. Morris had represented Pastoral Districts of Liverpool Plains and Gwydir in the old Legislative Council.

=== 1858 ===
1858 New South Wales colonial election: Liverpool Plains and Gwydir 10 February
Candidate	Votes	%
Edward Lloyd (elected 1)	242	47.9
Richard Jenkins (elected 2)	228	45.2
W G Pennington	35	6.9
Total formal votes	505	100.0
Informal votes	0	0.0
Turnout	505	41.7

The sitting members Gideon Lang and Francis Rusden did not contest the election.
