= Gideon Lang =

Australian politician

Gideon Scott Lang (1819–1880) was a Scottish born Australian pastoralist who was a key figure in the pioneer settlement of Victoria, the Riverina and the Darling Downs regions.

Born on 25 January 1819 in Selkirk, Lang left school at 16. In 1839, his brothers migrated to Melbourne to take up land on the Saltwater (now Maribynong) River. Lang joined them two years later as a shepherd. Leaving his brothers to run a toll bridge and then a fishing business, he returned to his brothers, eventually squatting on land near Buninyong.

In 1848, the brothers acquired land in the Riverina, eventually holding 30 miles of Murrumbidgee River frontage. The town of Hay on the Murrumbidgee, was originally known as Lang's Crossing Place. Lang explored southern Queensland and in 1851, after obtaining information on the whereabouts of Ludwig Leichhardt attempted to begin a search, but was restrained by drought.

In 1854, Lang married Elizabeth Jane Cape, the sister of the schoolmaster William Timothy Cape. He was elected to represent the Liverpool Plains and Gwydir in the New South Wales Legislative Assembly in 1856. On dissolution of the Assembly in 1857, Lang and his family toured Europe, meeting Giuseppe Garibaldi at Como in 1859 and returning to Australia in 1862.

In 1863, Lang became the founding president of the Riverine Association, formed to promote the interests of squatters and to advocate the separation of the Riverina from New South Wales. He was the first chairman of directors of the Commercial Bank of Australia on its establishment in 1866. Late in his life, he was involved in the Sydney International Exhibition in 1879. Lang died on 13 July 1880 (aged 61).

New South Wales Legislative Assembly
New parliament	Member for Liverpool Plains and Gwydir; 1856 – 1857; With: Francis Rusden	Succeeded by Richard Jenkins; Edward Lloyd
