= Chinatown, Darwin =

Australian ethnic enclave

Coordinates: 12.461984°S 130.842620°E

The Australian city of Darwin was once home to a Chinatown that existed from 1874 until it was destroyed in 1942. The Chinatown lay within the heart of Darwin and was first established by 186 Chinese workers who arrived by ship from Singapore. In Darwin, the Chinese faced more intense racial discrimination compared to the rest of Australia. Darwin's Chinatown was described as poor and unsightly by European Australians, and the demolition of several dwellings in Chinatown was ordered in 1913.

Darwin's Chinatown was razed to the ground in 1942 during World War II, through a combination of Japanese aerial bombing, vandalism from the Australian Defence Force, and local looting and bulldozing from European Australians targeting the Chinese community. The Chinese population had mostly been evacuated during the war and returned to find their homes and businesses reduced to rubble. After the destruction of Darwin Chinatown, Northern Territory administrator Aubrey Abbott used the opportunity to eliminate the Chinese community in the area and forcibly seize their land as it was considered prime real estate.

In 1943, Abbott wrote to Joseph Carrodus, secretary of the Department of the Interior, proposing that the federal government use the absence of the Chinese population to compulsorily acquire Darwin's Chinatown and thereby effect "the elimination of undesirable elements which Darwin has suffered from far too much in the past". He further stated that the acquisition would "entirely prevent the Chinese quarter forming again" and that "if land is acquired from the former Chinese residents there is really no need for them to return as they have no other assets". Under the Darwin Lands Acquisition Act 1945, the federal government compulsorily acquired 200 hectares (500 acres) of land in Darwin's town centre, of which 21 hectares (53 acres) was owned by Chinese residents.

In the early 2000s, there were proposals to rebuild a Chinatown in the city centre of Darwin as a tourist attraction, and the Chinatown Car Park was opened in September 2006 to align with the theme. However, the proposed Darwin Chinatown precinct never came to fruition and Chinatown Car Park was renamed Dragonfly Car Park in 2021, as its original name often confused visitors. Planned future stages of the development included office space, a hotel, private accommodation, retail areas, and architectural features reflecting a Chinatown environment.

The local Chinese association, the Chung Wah Society, operates the Northern Territory Chinese Museum, which is dedicated to the history of Chinese people in the Northern Territory, with a special focus on Darwin Chinatown. They also manage a Chinese temple at the same location.

Darwin Chinatown has never been rebuilt since its destruction, and there remains no Chinatown in Darwin.
