= Hilda Abbott =

Wife of Charles Lydiard Aubrey Abbott

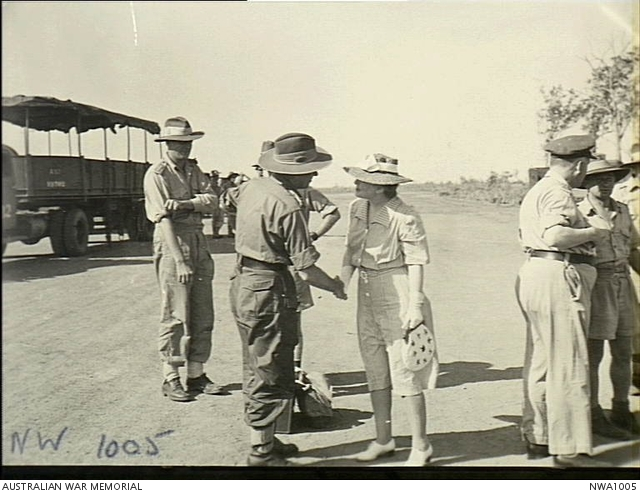
- Mrs C. L. A. (Hilda) Abbott, wife of the Administrator of the Northern Territory in 1945
- Born: Hilda Gertrude Harnett; 9 September 1890; Eucumbene station, near Adaminaby, New South Wales
- Died: 26 May 1984 (aged 93); Bowral, New South Wales, Australia
- Resting place: South Head cemetery
- Known for: Contributions to the Northern Territory's Red Cross branch
- Spouse: Charles Lydiard Aubrey Abbott (m. 1916; died 1975)

Hilda Gertrude Abbott (née Harnett; 9 September 1890 – 26 May 1984) was the wife of the former Administrator of the Northern Territory, Charles Lydiard Aubrey Abbott. She is best known her contribution to the Northern Territory's Red Cross branch.

== Early life ==
Abbott was born at Eucumbene station, near Adaminaby, New South Wales on 9 September 1890. She was the daughter of Australian grazier John Joseph Harnett.

During World War I Abbott worked in the office of the Australian Red Cross Society in Cairo (arriving at Suez15 January 1916) and, as part of her work she visited wounded soldiers; many of whom were coming in from the Gallipoli campaign. There she met Aubrey Abbott, who was invalided while serving in Sinai, and on 24 October 1916 they married at Westminster Cathedral, in London with Catholic rites.

After the war the couple settled at Echo Hills, a property near Kootingal, New South Wales. Soon after her husband entered federal politics and she assisted him in his career. Abbott also continued to travel in this period and went to Africa in 1925 and 1929, around Australian in 1932 and 1933 and to Europe in 1934 and 1936.

During this period she also had two daughters.

== Life in Darwin ==
Abbott arrived in Darwin, Northern Territory in 1937 with her husband Charles Lydiard Aubrey Abbott, who was the Administrator of the Northern Territory from 1937 to 1946. During that period she became known as the "First Lady".

Abbott wrote numerous newspaper and magazine articles about her time in Darwin for newspapers and magazines around Australia under the penname 'Haliden Hartt' She had used this pseudonym as early as 1916 when working in Cairo.

After moving to Darwin, she revived the local branch of the Red Cross, as its president. In 1946 the Red Cross named one its buildings "Hilda Abbott Cottage" in her honour.

During the Bombing of Darwin the Abbott's were forced to take shelter in a room beneath Government House and, during the bombing, Abbott is credited in saving the life of an Aboriginal woman named Elsey who was working there. After the bombing Hilda drove a group of evacuees from Darwin to Alice Springs, they did not have a permit to travel and she had to bluff her way through numerous military checkpoints. Her rationale for this trip was to warn the civil authorities in Alice Springs of the flood of evacuees that would soon be coming. She was joined soon after by her husband.

in Alice Springs she lived at The Residency with his and she shared his frustrations about the limited role that the pair where allowed there with the increased role of the military. They remained there until Darwin was reoccupied in July 1945.

She left for New South Wales in 1946. She explored and documented on film the Aboriginal cave paintings of Kimberley and Arnhem Land in the 1950s and 1960s, and lectured on Australian topics.

== Darwin Red Cross ==
In Darwin, the Red Cross is rendered war-time service to the members of the three services. The three services are the Australian air force, navy and land force respectively.

== Later life ==
She left for New South Wales in 1946. She explored and documented on film the Aboriginal cave paintings of Kimberley and Arnhem Land in the 1950s and 1960s, and lectured on Australian topics.

In the 1950s Abbott also became a well-known broadcaster and interior designer. Her work as a designer included a commission to redecorate the bedrooms of the Wentworth Hotel in Sydney.

She died on 26 May 1984 at Bowral, New South Wales and is buried at South Head General Cemetery in Sydney.

== Resources ==
Abbott's diaries, "Good Night, All About: Reminiscence of life in Darwin and the Northern Territory 1937-1946", were published in 2015 by the Historical Society of the Northern Territory.

A book about Abbott's life was also published by the Society in 2017: The intrepid Hilda Abbott: author, designer, Red Cross Officer, political wife, 1890-1984 by Pam Oliver.

Her papers and oral history recording are held at the National Library of Australia.
