= 1953 Gwydir by-election =

A by-election was held for the Australian House of Representatives seat of Gwydir on 19 December 1953. This was triggered by the death of Country Party MP Thomas Treloar.

The by-election was won by Country Party candidate Ian Allan.

== Results ==
Gwydir by-election, 1953
Party	Candidate	Votes	%	±%
Labor	Michael Quinn	15,784	45.3	−1.5
Country	Ian Allan	9,823	28.2	−8.8
Country	Thelma Kirkby	5,649	16.2	+16.2
Liberal	Arthur Howard	3,584	10.3	+10.3
Total formal votes		34,840	98.6	
Informal votes		480	1.4	
Turnout		35,320	89.2	
Two-party-preferred result
Country	Ian Allan	18,409	52.8	−0.4
Labor	Michael Quinn	16,431	47.2	+0.4
Country hold		Swing	−0.4	
