= Thelma Bate =

Australian activist

Thelma Bate CBE

Personal details
- Born: Thelma Florence Olsen; 3 August 1904 Sydney, New South Wales, Australia
- Died: 26 July 1984 (aged 79) Gordon, New South Wales, Australia
- Party: Country Party
- Spouse(s): Richard Falkner Harvey (m. 1934; died 1946) Kenneth Kirkby (m. 1949, divorced) Jeff Bate (m. 1958; div. 1968)
- Education: University of Sydney (BA)

Thelma Florence Bate CBE (née Olsen; formerly Harvey and Kirkby; 3 August 1904 – 26 July 1984) was an Australian community leader and women's activist.

== Early life and education ==
Born Thelma Florence Olsen in Sydney on 3 August 1904, she was the daughter of Norwegian seaman Olaf Olsen and his wife Florence Beatrice Olsen (née St Clair), who was born in Melbourne. Her mother married Carl Gustav Sundstrom in 1912.

Thelma attended Fort Street Girls' High School before graduating from the University of Sydney with a Bachelor of Arts in 1928. She subsequently taught at Meriden School and travelled abroad.

== Career ==
In 1969, she stood as the Country Party candidate for the seat of Dubbo in the state election. Thelma Harvey was one of the first women endorsed by the Country Party to contest an election in Australia. She also contested the 1953 Gwydir by-election.

Kirkby continued to contest elections for the Country Party but was not elected. She represented New South Wales at the Associated Country Women of the World conference in Toronto in 1953, and continued to be active in the community. A committee member of the Freedom from Hunger Campaign, she was the New South Wales representative to the United Nations Association of Australia International Women's Year committee.

Bate was honorary secretary (1957–1959) and president (1959–1962) of the CWA, when she became known for her strong support of the inclusion of Aboriginal women in the CWA. She was treasurer of the Foundation for Aboriginal Affairs in the 1960s and was appointed Commander of the Order of the British Empire (CBE) in 1969.

== Personal life and death ==
She married grazier Richard Falkner Harvey on 20 June 1934 at St Philip's Church of England in Sydney and settled on his property near Ivanhoe, where she joined the Country Women's Association. Her husband died in 1946.

She married Kenneth Kirkby, a Country Party executive member, on 8 December 1949 at St John's Church of England in Darlinghurst; the couple lived at Bellata near Moree, and were divorced.

On 12 June 1958, she married Jeff Bate, the Liberal member for Macarthur in the Australian House of Representatives, who farmed at Tilba Tilba. They divorced in 1968.

She died on 26 July 1984 at Gordon.

== Archives ==
- National Library of Australia. Oral History, Thelma Bate interviewed by Hazel de Berg record in 1975.
