= Division of Gwydir =

Former Australian federal electoral division

Gwydir Australian House of Representatives Division
- Created: 1901
- Abolished: 2007
- Namesake: Gwydir River

The Division of Gwydir was an Australian electoral division in the state of New South Wales. The division was proclaimed in 1900, and was one of the original 65 divisions to be contested at the first federal election. As a result of the electoral redistribution of 13 September 2006, Gwydir was abolished and ceased to exist at the 2007 federal election.

Gwydir was named for the Gwydir River (which in turn was named by the explorer Allan Cunningham after his patron Peter Burrell, Baron Gwydyr, who took his title from Gwydir Castle in Wales). The division was located in western New South Wales, and at the time of its abolition included the towns of Bourke, Moree, Mudgee and Brewarrina.

The seat was a stronghold of the Australian Workers' Union, and until the 1940s was one of the few country seats where the Australian Labor Party usually did well. It was in Labor hands for all but six terms from 1903 to 1949. However, it was held by the National Party from 1949 onward, and from the mid-1970s onward it was usually fairly safe for that party.

Its last Labor member, William Scully, was a Cabinet minister in the Ben Chifley government. The final member, John Anderson, was Leader of the National Party and Deputy Prime Minister in the Howard Government until he resigned the position.

Gwydir was held by two deputy leaders of the National Party, Anderson and his predecessor in Gwydir, Ralph Hunt.

In September 2006 the New South Wales redistribution commissioners decided to abolish Gwydir. The abolition took effect at the 2007 federal election. Most of the division became part of the Division of Parkes, while some towns in the Upper Hunter Shire (mainly Scone, Aberdeen, Merriwa and Murrurundi) were absorbed into the Division of Hunter.

== Members ==
Image	Member	Party	Term	Notes
	George Cruickshank (1853–1904)	Protectionist	29 March 1901 – 23 November 1903	Previously held the New South Wales Legislative Assembly seat of Inverell. Retired
	William Webster (1860–1936)	Labor	16 December 1903 – 14 November 1916	Previously held the New South Wales Legislative Assembly seat of Moree. Served as minister under Hughes. Lost seat
	William Webster (1860–1936)	National Labor	14 November 1916 – 17 February 1917	Previously held the New South Wales Legislative Assembly seat of Moree. Served as minister under Hughes. Lost seat
	William Webster (1860–1936)	Nationalist	17 February 1917 – 13 December 1919	Previously held the New South Wales Legislative Assembly seat of Moree. Served as minister under Hughes. Lost seat
	Lou Cunningham (1889–1948)	Labor	13 December 1919 – 14 November 1925	Lost seat
	Aubrey Abbott (1886–1975)	Country	14 November 1925 – 12 October 1929	Served as minister under Bruce. Lost seat
	Lou Cunningham (1889–1948)	Labor	12 October 1929 – 19 December 1931	Lost seat. Later elected to the New South Wales Legislative Assembly seat of Coogee in 1941
	Aubrey Abbott (1886–1975)	Country	19 December 1931 – 28 March 1937	Resigned to become Administrator of the Northern Territory
	William Scully (1883–1966)	Labor	8 May 1937 – 10 December 1949	Previously held the New South Wales Legislative Assembly seat of Namoi. Served as minister under Curtin, Forde and Chifley. Lost seat
	Thomas Treloar (1892–1953)	Country	10 December 1949 – 15 November 1953	Died in office
	Ian Allan (1916–2000)	Country	19 December 1953 – 30 April 1969	Resigned to retire from politics
	Ralph Hunt (1928–2011)	Country	7 June 1969 – 2 May 1975	Served as minister under Gorton, McMahon and Fraser. Resigned to retire from politics
	Ralph Hunt (1928–2011)	National Country	2 May 1975 – 16 October 1982	Served as minister under Gorton, McMahon and Fraser. Resigned to retire from politics
	Ralph Hunt (1928–2011)	Nationals	16 October 1982 – 24 February 1989	Served as minister under Gorton, McMahon and Fraser. Resigned to retire from politics
	John Anderson (1956–)	Nationals	15 April 1989 – 17 October 2007	Served as minister and Deputy Prime Minister under Howard. Retired after Gwydir was abolished in 2007
