= Thomas Treloar =

Australian politician

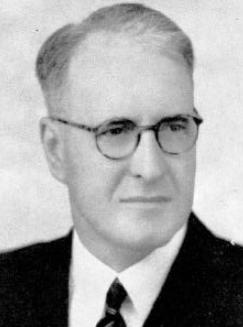

Member of the Australian Parliament for Gwydir
- In office 10 December 1949 – 15 November 1953
- Preceded by: William Scully
- Succeeded by: Ian Allan

Personal details
- Born: 1 August 1892 Tamworth, New South Wales
- Died: 15 November 1953 (aged 61) Tamworth, New South Wales
- Party: Australian Country Party
- Occupation: Company director

Thomas John Treloar (1 August 1892 – 15 November 1953), known as Jack Treloar, was an Australian politician. Born in Tamworth, New South Wales, he was educated at Sydney Grammar School before returning to Tamworth as a shopkeeper. He eventually became a company director before serving in World War I 1915–18 and World War II 1942–46. In 1949, he was elected to the Australian House of Representatives as the Country Party member for Gwydir, defeating Labor minister William Scully. He died in 1953, necessitating a by-election for his seat.

== Early life ==
Treloar was born on 8 January 1892 in Tamworth, New South Wales. He attended Tamworth Primary School and Sydney Grammar School.

Treloar's father was a successful retailer in Tamworth. After leaving school he began working in the store's drapery department, eventually taking over the business at the age of 28 in conjunction with his brother William.

== Military service ==
Treloar enlisted in the Australian Imperial Force (AIF) in June 1915, joining as a private in the 18th Battalion. He served on the Gallipoli campaign and later in France, where he received an eye injury at the Battle of Pozières. He was discharged from the AIF in 1918 with the rank of sergeant.

During the Second World War, Treloar received an honorary commission as an officer in the Royal Australian Air Force (RAAF) in October 1941. He held the rank of pilot officer in the Air Training Corps and served for a period in Tamworth prior to his discharge in November 1946.

== Politics ==
Treloar was influenced to become active in party politics by the Chifley government's support for nationalisation of the private banking industry. He was a member of the state executive of the Country Party and first stood for parliament at the 1946 federal election, losing the seat of Gwydir to the incumbent Australian Labor Party (ALP) member William Scully. He successfully reprised his candidacy against Scully at the 1949 election and was re-elected at the 1951 election.

== Personal life ==
In 1922, Treloar married Molly Woodhill, with whom he had three children. His oldest son John was killed while serving with the RAAF during World War II. His second son Bruce succeeded his father as managing director of TJ Treloar and Co. and expanded the business into "one of the state's leading department stores".

Treloar was diagnosed with a terminal illness in 1952 and died in Tamworth on 15 November 1953, aged 61.

Parliament of Australia
Preceded by William Scully	Member for Gwydir; 1949–1953	Succeeded by Ian Allan
