= Richard Lewis Jenkins =

Welsh-born Australian politician

Richard Lewis Jenkins (1815 – 13 August 1883) was a Welsh-born Australian politician.

He was born at Newport in Monmouthshire, the son of Richard Jenkins. A qualified medical doctor, he migrated to Sydney for health reasons in 1841. After settling in the Hunter Valley, he married Mary Rae Johnstone, the daughter of the first magistrate. He bought land on the Peel and Namoi rivers. In 1857 he returned to Sydney, and in 1858 he was elected to the New South Wales Legislative Assembly for Liverpool Plains and Gwydir. Re-elected for Gwydir in 1859, he was defeated in 1860. He was an early advocate for compulsory universal public education. Jenkins died at Brisbane in 1883.

New South Wales Legislative Assembly
Preceded by Gideon Lang; Francis Rusden	Member for Liverpool Plains and Gwydir; 1858–1859; Served alongside: Edward Lloyd	Abolished
New seat	Member for Gwydir; 1859–1860	Succeeded by Francis Rusden
