= Ian Allan (politician) =

Australian politician

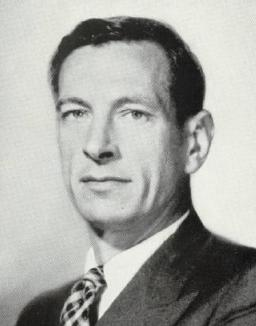

Member of the Australian Parliament for Gwydir
- In office 19 December 1953 – 30 April 1969
- Preceded by: Thomas Treloar
- Succeeded by: Ralph Hunt

Personal details
- Born: 3 January 1916 Newcastle, New South Wales
- Died: 13 February 2000 (aged 84)
- Party: Australian Country Party
- Occupation: Radio announcer

Archibald Ian Allan (3 January 1916 – 13 February 2000) was an Australian politician. Born in Newcastle, New South Wales, he attended Sydney Grammar School before becoming an overseer at CSR. After serving in World War II from 1939 to 1946, he became an ABC announcer in Tamworth. In the by-election for the Australian House of Representatives seat of Gwydir that followed the death of Thomas Treloar in 1953, Allan was selected as the Country Party candidate and won. He held the seat until his resignation in 1969, after which he became Secretary-General of the Commonwealth War Graves Commission. Allan died in 2000.

Parliament of Australia
Preceded by Thomas Treloar	Member for Gwydir; 1953–1969	Succeeded by Ralph Hunt
