= 1989 Gwydir by-election =

- 15 April 1989
	First party	Second party	Third party
		IND	IND
Candidate	John Anderson	John Uebergang	Bevan O'Regan
Party	National	Independent	Independent
Popular vote	31,209	14,660	9,881
Percentage	56.0%	26.3%	17.7%
Swing	▼1.2	▲26.3	▲17.7
TPP	60.4%	39.6%
TPP swing	▲0.1	▲39.6
MP before election
Ralph Hunt
National
Elected MP
John Anderson
National

A by-election was held for the Australian House of Representatives seat of Gwydir on 15 April 1989. This was triggered by the resignation of National Party MP Ralph Hunt.

The Australian Labor Party did not field a candidate. The by-election was won by the National Party's John Anderson.

== Candidates ==
- National Party of Australia – John Anderson, farmer and grazier.
- Independent – Bevan O'Regan. O'Regan had contested New England at the 1987 election as an independent National candidate, supporting the Joh for Canberra campaign. He later contested the Senate in 1996 for Australians Against Further Immigration and in 1998 for One Nation.
- Independent – John Uebergang. Uebergang later contested the Senate in the 1993 election for the Confederate Action Party.

== Results ==
1989 Gwydir by-election
Party	Candidate	Votes	%	±%
National	John Anderson	31,209	56.0	−1.2
Independent	John Uebergang	14,660	26.3	+26.3
Independent	Bevan O'Regan	9,881	17.7	+17.7
Total formal votes		55,750	95.3	
Informal votes		2,768	4.7	
Turnout		58,518	84.0	
Two-candidate-preferred result
National	John Anderson		60.4 (Note: The Australian Electoral Commission has no record of the distribution of preferences for this by-election, despite the fact that a full distribution was required by the Electoral Act. Adam Carr estimates a majority of 60.4% for Anderson, assuming 75% of O'Regan's preferences went to Uebergang.)	
Independent	John Uebergang		39.6	
National hold		Swing	N/A	

== See also ==
- List of Australian federal by-elections
