= Richard Murray (Australian politician) =

Irish-born Australian politician

Richard Lennon Murray (1840 – 13 March 1887) was an Irish-born Australian politician.

He was born in County Tipperary to denominational schoolteacher Henry Murray and his wife Mary Ann. In 1861 he married Catherine McEvoy. He migrated to Australia in 1869, becoming a surveyor. In 1880 he was elected to the New South Wales Legislative Assembly for Inverell, serving until his defeat in 1885. Murray died at Leichhardt in 1887.

New South Wales Legislative Assembly
New seat	Member for Inverell; 1880–1885	Succeeded by Samuel Moore
