= William McIntyre (Australian politician) =

Australian politician

William Donald McIntyre (2 January 1869 – 4 May 1902) was an Australian politician.

He was born at Tinonee to Presbyterian minister Allan McIntyre. He attended Sydney Grammar School and then the University of Sydney, where he received a Bachelor of Arts in 1890. He was called to the bar in 1891, practising in Sydney and in north-western New South Wales. In 1901 he was elected to the New South Wales Legislative Assembly as the Progressive member for Inverell, but he died in Sydney in 1902.

New South Wales Legislative Assembly
Preceded by George Cruickshank	Member for Inverell; 1901–1902	Succeeded by George Jones
