= George Cruickshank (Australian politician) =

Australian politician (1853–1904)

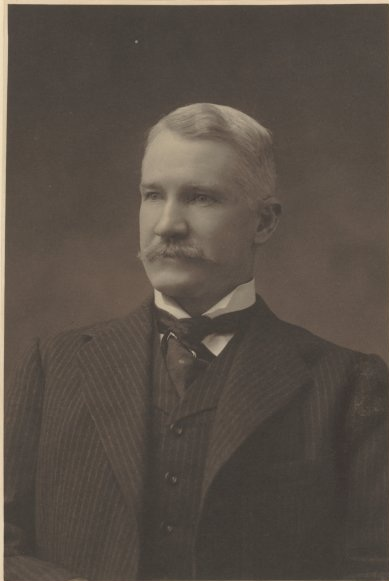

Member of the Australian Parliament for Gwydir
- In office 29 March 1901 – 23 November 1903
- Preceded by: New seat
- Succeeded by: William Webster

Personal details
- Born: 1 February 1853 Dubbo, New South Wales
- Died: 12 April 1904 (aged 51) Bowral, New South Wales
- Party: Protectionist Party
- Occupation: Grazier

George Alexander Cruickshank (1 February 1853 – 12 April 1904) was an Australian politician. Born near Dubbo, New South Wales, he attended Collegiate School in Bathurst, and was a grazier in northern New South Wales from 1878. In 1889 he was elected to the New South Wales Legislative Assembly as the member for Inverell, a position he held until 1898. In the first federal election in 1901, Cruickshank was elected to the Australian House of Representatives as a Protectionist, representing the seat of Gwydir. He retired in 1903, and died in 1904.

New South Wales Legislative Assembly
Preceded by Samuel Moore	Member for Inverell; 1889–1901	Succeeded by William McIntyre
Parliament of Australia
New seat	Member for Gwydir; 1901–1903	Succeeded by William Webster
