= John Crane (Australian politician) =

Australian politician

John Thomas Crane (12 February 1868 – 6 August 1948) was an Australian politician.

== Early life ==
Crane was born in Warialda to grazier John Crane and Elizabeth née McGee. He attended Tamworth Grammar School and then the University of Sydney, where he received a Bachelor of Science in 1887. In 1888 he began a stock and station agency at Moree. On 31 July 1891 he married Charlotte Mary Gall, with whom he would have six children. From 1894 he worked as a land agent in addition to his farming.

== Civic work ==
He also served on Moree Council as mayor in 1903, 1905, 1906, and 1908 to 1912. He was the first Clerk of the Boomi and Boolooroo shire Councils from 1906, retiring from the position in 1938. From its inception in about 1906 he acted as Secretary of the Moree Stock Board (later called the Moree Pastures Protection Board) until 1934, taking a keen interest in the affairs of the Shires and the Board even after his retirement.

== Legislative Assembly ==
In 1913, with endorsement from the Liberal Reform Party and the Farmers' and Settlers' Association of New South Wales, he was elected to the New South Wales Legislative Assembly as the member for Gwydir. He was a minister without portfolio assisting the Secretary for Lands in the Holman Nationalist ministry from February to April 1920, but he was defeated at the 1920 elections contesting the multi-member seat of Namoi.

== Later life and death ==
Crane had been a director of Country Producers' Selling Company Ltd. since 1910 and would hold that position until his death. He was known as a racing enthusiast, winning many races in Sydney and country centres with his horses — Foundling, Felspar, Wanda, Cavalier, Alibi, Weemelah and Sealster. In conjunction with A. B. F. Zlotkowski, G. Wigg and A. James, he was one of the initial promoters of football in Moree and remained interested in the activities of the football clubs in town. He was also president of the Moree Bowling Club for one term.

He died in Moree on 6 August 1948 (aged 80). Mary Gall had predeceased him, as had 2 daughters (Eileen and Laura) and a son (Charles). He was survived by 3 sons (Norton, Alan and Harold).

New South Wales Legislative Assembly
Preceded by George Jones	Member for Gwydir; 1913 – 1920	District abolished
Civic offices
Preceded by S L Cohen	Mayor of Moree; 1903	Succeeded by Henry Pike
Preceded by Henry Pike	Mayor of Moree; 1905 – 1906	Succeeded by R Magee
Preceded by R Magee	Mayor of Moree; 1908 – 1913	Succeeded by Roger Delander
