= Francis Rusden =

Australian politician

Personal details
- Born: Francis Townsend Rusden; 1 January 1811 Dorking
- Died: 7 June 1887 (aged 70) Merriwa, New South Wales

Francis Townsend Rusden (1811 – 7 June 1887) was an Australian politician and pastoralist. He was a member of the New South Wales Legislative Assembly between 1856 and 1857 and again between 1860 and 1864.

== Early life ==
Rusden was the son of an Anglican clergyman who migrated to New South Wales and was appointed to a chaplaincy in Maitland in 1835. After a liberal education under his father's tutorship, Rusden worked as an assistant surveyor in the Lands Department. After resigning in 1842, he squatted in the vicinity of Gwydir River and eventually acquired more than 100,000 acres of pastoral land in the Gwydir and Wellington districts. After retiring from parliament, Rusden was appointed to the position of police magistrate in the Liverpool Plains district. His nine siblings included Thomas Rusden, who was also a pastoralist and member of the Legislative Assembly, the historian George Rusden and the polemicist and noted Victorian public servant Henry Rusden.

== State Parliament ==
Rusden was elected as the member for Liverpool Plains and Gwydir at the first election held in New South Wales under responsible government. He was not a candidate at the next election in 1858 but won the seat of Gwydir at the 1860 election. He was defeated in 1864-5 and was unsuccessful at a further attempt to re-enter parliament in 1872. He did not hold a ministerial or parliamentary position.

New South Wales Legislative Assembly
Preceded by First election	Member for Liverpool Plains and Gwydir; 1856 – 1858; Served alongside: Lang	Succeeded by Richard Jenkins
Preceded by Richard Jenkins	Member for Gwydir; 1860 – 1864	Succeeded by Thomas Dangar Jr.
