= Percy Stirton =

Australian politician

Percy Ernest Stirton (17 August 1867 – 27 January 1937) was an Australian politician.

== Biography ==
He was born in Paterson to Presbyterian minister Thomas Stirton and Jean Ray Bell Nivison. He was educated at Sydney Grammar School and in 1884 was articled as a clerk to an Inverell solicitor. He was admitted as a solicitor in 1890, practising in a partnership at Moree. He was also a Moree alderman, serving as mayor in 1886. In 1903 he was elected in a by-election to the New South Wales Legislative Assembly as the Liberal member for Moree, but he was defeated running for Gwydir the following year. He later became a grazier, and was involved in the formation of the Country Party. Stirton died at Darlinghurst in 1937.

New South Wales Legislative Assembly
Preceded by William Webster	Member for Moree; 1903–1904	District abolished
Civic offices
Unknown	Mayor of Moree; 1886	Unknown
