= Aubrey Abbott =

Australian politician (1886–1975)

The Honourable Aubrey Abbott
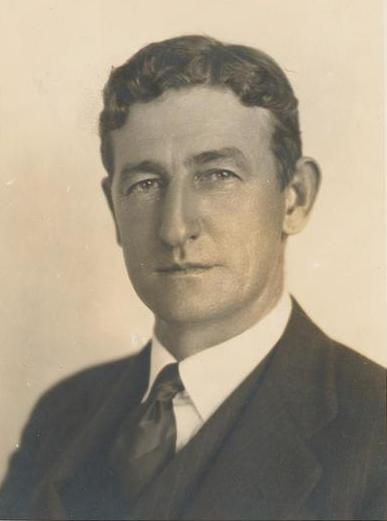

Administrator of the Northern Territory
- In office 29 March 1937 – 1 July 1946
- Preceded by: Robert Weddell
- Succeeded by: Arthur Driver

Minister for Home and Territories
- In office 29 November 1928 – 22 October 1929
- Prime Minister: Stanley Bruce
- Preceded by: Neville Howse
- Succeeded by: Arthur Blakeley (Home Affairs)

Member of the Australian Parliament for Gwydir
- In office 19 December 1931 – 28 March 1937
- Preceded by: Lou Cunningham
- Succeeded by: William Scully
- In office 14 November 1925 – 12 October 1929
- Preceded by: Lou Cunningham
- Succeeded by: Lou Cunningham

Personal details
- Born: 4 May 1886 St Leonards, New South Wales, Australia
- Died: 30 April 1975 (aged 88) Darlinghurst, New South Wales, Australia
- Party: Country
- Spouse: Hilda Gertrude Hartnett (m. 1916)
- Relations: Sir Joseph Abbott (uncle); Joe Abbott (cousin); Mac Abbott (cousin)
- Occupation: Jackeroo, soldier

Military service
- Allegiance: Australia
- Branch/service: 1st Australian Imperial Force (1914); Australian Naval and Military Expeditionary Force (1914)
- Years of service: 1914-1918
- Rank: Captain
- Unit: 12th Light Horse Regiment
- Battles/wars: First World War

Charles Lydiard Aubrey Abbott (4 May 1886 – 30 April 1975) was an Australian politician and public servant. He served as administrator of the Northern Territory from 1937 to 1946, a period encompassing the bombing of Darwin and other Japanese air raids on the territory during World War II. Originally a grazier from New South Wales, he was a Country Party politician prior to his time in the Northern Territory and served as Minister for Home Territories in the Bruce–Page government from 1928 to 1929. He was a member of the House of Representatives from 1925 to 1929 and 1931 to 1937, representing the seat of Gwydir.

== Early life and military service ==
Abbott was born on 4 May 1886 in St Leonards, New South Wales. He was the son of Marion (née Lydiard) and Thomas Kingsmill Abbott. His father was a magistrate and his uncles William and Joseph Palmer Abbott had served in the New South Wales Legislative Assembly, while his cousins Joe Abbott and Mac Abbott later entered federal parliament.

Educated at The King's School, Sydney, Abbott left school at 14 to work as a jackeroo near Gunnedah; he also attempted to become an actor in Sydney and a stockman in Queensland. He joined the New South Wales Police Force where he worked as a confidential clerk at the police headquarters in Sydney.

In 1914, at the outbreak of World War I, he enlisted in the Australian Naval and Military Expeditionary Force, and then transferred to the Australian Imperial Force, and served in New Guinea, Gallipoli, and Sinai.

While serving overseas he met and married Australian woman Hilda Gertrude Hartnett on 24 October 1916 in Westminster Cathedral in London, where he had been sent after falling ill in the trenches. He returned to World War I in 1917, and took part in the Egyptian Expeditionary Force advance to Damascus. He was wounded in 1918, and promoted to captain. He returned to Australia in 1920.

== Member of Parliament ==
On his return to Australia Abbott bought a "Murrulla", a grazing property near Tamworth, New South Wales, this purchase was financed by his uncle William. Abbott became active in the Graziers' Association of New South Wales and the Northern New State League.

He made an unsuccessful attempt to enter the New South Wales Legislative Assembly in 1925 via the seat of Namoi, but defeated Lou Cunningham to win Gwydir for the Country Party at the federal elections of that year. He rose quickly through parliament and became Minister for Home Affairs in 1928, but was defeated at the 1929 elections.

== Administrator of the Northern Territory ==
=== Initial years ===
No longer a member of parliament, Abbott became secretary to the Primary Producers' Advisory Council, and it has been suggested that he was an organiser of the paramilitary Old Guard. He was returned as the member for Gwydir in 1931 and remained in parliament until 1937, when he was appointed administrator of the Northern Territory; this also made him Commissioner of Police for the NT. Perceived as insensitive, arrogant and authoritarian, he was met with hostility by many Northern Territorians, especially in Darwin, although he had a good relationship with the pastoral industry. He was instrumental in removing Cecil Cook as chief protector of Aborigines in 1938 and, although he was on good terms with his Aboriginal staff, he was a paternalist who viewed Aboriginal people mostly as a resource.

As administrator, Abbott was "devoutly" opposed to organised labour and came into conflict with the North Australian Workers' Union (NAWU). In 1937 he unsuccessfully submitted to the local arbitration court that "half-caste" Indigenous waterside workers should have their award wages docked on racial grounds.

=== World War II ===
Abbott was almost killed in the Japanese bombing attack on Darwin on 19 February 1942, which damaged Government House, Darwin where he and Hilda were living. The pair were lucky to survive and, hearing the air raid siren, he and his family sought shelter in a room beneath the building. Abbott saved a flag that had been flying at Government House as he realised that this would have been the first Australian flag damaged on Australian soil by enemy action. He arranged for it to be presented at the newly opened Australian War Memorial.

After the bombing there was a Commission of Inquiry, led by Charles Lowe, in which Abbott was criticised for lack of leadership. Abbott was denied counsel in this inquiry and felt that many were bias against him. He assisted in the evacuation of civil administration to The Residency in Alice Springs.

In Alice Springs Abbott butted heads with Brigadier Noel Loutit, who had jurisdiction over all the troops and staging camps between Alice Springs and Larrimah and the two found it difficult to work with each other. As Administrator Abbot was still in charge of civilian matters but Loutit had a much higher level of control on the movement of goods and people.

In 1943, Abbott wrote to Joseph Carrodus, secretary of the Department of the Interior, proposing that the federal government use compulsory acquisition to destroy Darwin's Chinatown and thereby reduce the territory's Chinese population. He referred to "the elimination of undesirable elements which Darwin has suffered from far too much in the past" and stated that he hoped to "entirely prevent the Chinese quarter forming again". He further observed that "if land is acquired from the former Chinese residents there is really no need for them to return as they have no other assets". The federal government subsequently passed the Darwin Lands Acquisition Act 1945 which compulsorily acquired 53 acres (21 ha) of land owned by Chinese-Australians. The Territory's civilian population had mostly been evacuated during the war and the former Chinatown residents returned to find their homes and businesses reduced to rubble.

In August 1943 Abbott also sought help from the Commonwealth Government for improved housing options for 'part-Aboriginal' people, many of whom had grown up at The Bungalow, in Alice Springs. He sought budget allocation for the construction of 22 homes and the money was eventually made available with the houses being completed after the war; these became known as The Gap Cottages. Loutit was in opposition to this development and said that: "There are many cases of deserving white people who should receive consideration before the squandering of £6,600 on [Aboriginal people]."

Abbott did not return to Darwin, or Government House, until July 1945 and, on 26 May 1946, he left the NT on sick leave and was suspended the next day.

== Later life ==
In 1950 he published a book, Australia's Frontier Province, in which he surveyed the Northern Territory's development. He retired to Bowral and continued writing. He died on 30 April 1975 at Darlinghurst, and was given a state funeral. He was the last surviving member of Stanley Bruce's Cabinet.

Political offices
Preceded by Neville Howse	Minister for Home and Territories; 1928–1929	Succeeded by Arthur Blakeley
Preceded by Robert Weddell	Administrator of the Northern Territory; 1937–1946	Succeeded by Arthur Driver
Parliament of Australia
Preceded by Lou Cunningham	Member for Gwydir; 1925–1929	Succeeded by Lou Cunningham
Preceded by Lou Cunningham	Member for Gwydir; 1931–1937	Succeeded by William Scully
