= Electoral district of Moree =

Former state electoral district of New South Wales, Australia

Coordinates: 29°27′57″S 149°50′02″E

Moree New South Wales—Legislative Assembly
- State: New South Wales
- Created: 1894
- Abolished: 1904
- Demographic: Rural

Moree was an electoral district of the Legislative Assembly in the Australian state of New South Wales, created in 1894 largely replacing Gwydir and including the town of Moree. The district was abolished in 1904 as a result of the 1903 New South Wales referendum, which reduced the number of members of the Legislative Assembly from 125 to 90, and was largely replaced by a recreated Gwydir.

== Members for Moree ==
Member	Party	Period
Thomas Hassall	Protectionist	1894–1901
William Webster	Labour	1901–1903
Percy Stirton	Liberal Reform	1903–1904

== Election results ==
1903 Moree state by-election
Party	Candidate	Votes	%	±%
Liberal Reform	Percy Stirton	689	61.03	+61.03
Independent Liberal	Alfredo Zlotkowski	440	38.97	+38.97
Total formal votes		1,129	98.69	N/A
Informal votes		15	1.31	N/A
Turnout		1,144	39.79 (Note: Estimate based on a roll of 2,875 at the 1901 election.)	−18.16
Liberal Reform gain from Labour				
