= William Scully (Australian politician) =

Australian politician

The Honourable William Scully
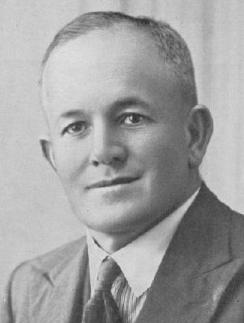

Vice-President of the Executive Council
- In office 1 November 1946 – 19 December 1949
- Prime Minister: Ben Chifley
- Preceded by: Joe Collings
- Succeeded by: Enid Lyons

Minister for Commerce and Agriculture
- In office 22 December 1942 – 1 November 1946
- Prime Minister: John Curtin; Frank Forde; Ben Chifley
- Preceded by: Himself (Commerce)
- Succeeded by: Reg Pollard

Minister for Commerce
- In office 7 October 1941 – 22 December 1942
- Prime Minister: John Curtin
- Preceded by: Earle Page
- Succeeded by: Himself (Commerce and Agriculture)

Member of the Australian Parliament for Gwydir
- In office 8 May 1937 – 10 December 1949
- Preceded by: Aubrey Abbott
- Succeeded by: Thomas Treloar

Personal details
- Born: 1 February 1883 Sydney, New South Wales, Australia
- Died: 19 March 1966 (aged 83) Tamworth, New South Wales, Australia
- Party: Labor
- Spouse: Grace Myrtle Kilbride (m. 1925)
- Relations: Patrick Scully (brother)
- Children: 3, incl. Jim Scully
- Occupation: Contractor

William James Scully (1 February 1883 – 19 March 1966) was an Australian politician and farmer. He was a member of the Australian Labor Party (ALP) and held ministerial office in the governments of John Curtin and Ben Chifley, serving as Minister for Commerce (1941–1942), Commerce and Agriculture (1942–1946) and Vice-President of the Executive Council (1946–1949). He served in the House of Representatives from 1937 to 1949, representing the New South Wales seat of Gwydir.

== Early life ==
Born in Sydney to Thomas James Scully and his wife Sarah Lucy Rutherford, he was educated at a small school near Tamworth. He and his brothers worked as contract labourers, and by the age of 21 Scully was a contractor. In 1912 he became a justice of the peace. He was also involved with the Tamworth Progress Association and the Primary Producers' Union of New South Wales. At Tamworth in 1925 he married Grace Myrtle Kilbride.

== NSW politics ==
In 1903, Scully joined the Tamworth Political Labor League and soon rose to become president. After three unsuccessful attempts to enter the New South Wales Legislative Assembly, he succeeded his brother Patrick, in the electorate of Namoi in 1923. Although he agreed with many of the views of New South Wales Premier Jack Lang, Scully remained loyal to the Prime Minister, James Scullin, and to the Australian Labor Party. He lost Namoi in 1932.

== Federal politics ==
Having bred horses for five years, Scully stood in a 1937 by-election for the federal seat of Gwydir, which he won. When Labor won government in 1941, the Prime Minister, John Curtin, appointed him Minister for Commerce, to which was added Agriculture in 1942. He held this position under Curtin, Frank Forde and Ben Chifley, and chaired the Australian Food Council. "The Scully Plan", which aimed to guarantee wheat farmers a minimum price of four shillings per bushel, was introduced in 1942.

Scully was appointed Vice-President of the Executive Council in 1946, a post he held until 1949, when he was defeated at the elections. He retired to Tamworth, where he grew lucerne and served on Tamworth City Council. He was also involved with the New England University College, the Tamworth and District Workmen's Club, and the Tamworth Cricket Association. Renowned for his integrity, sincerity and directness, Scully died on 19 March 1966 and was given a state funeral.

New South Wales Legislative Assembly
Preceded by Patrick Scully	Member for Namoi; 1923–1932; Served alongside: Frank Chaffey/none, Walter Wearne/none	Succeeded by Colin Sinclair
Political offices
Preceded by Earle Page	Minister for Commerce (and Agriculture); 1941–1946	Succeeded by Reginald Pollard
Preceded by Joe Collings	Vice-President of the Executive Council; 1946–1949	Succeeded by Enid Lyons
Parliament of Australia
Preceded by Aubrey Abbott	Member for Gwydir; 1937–1949	Succeeded by Thomas Treloar
