= Thomas Hassall =

Australian politician

Thomas Henry Hassall
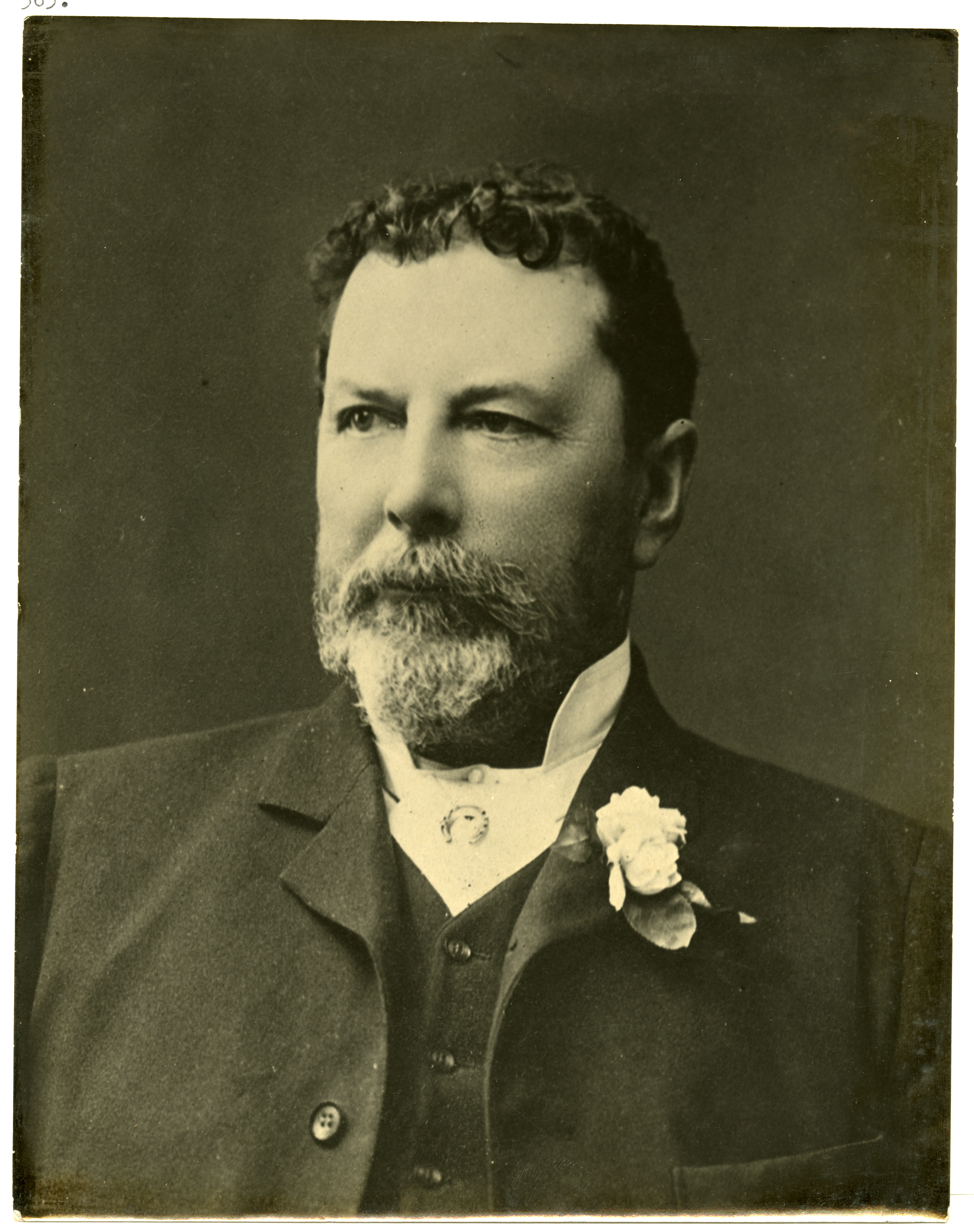

Member of the New South Wales Legislative Assembly for Gwydir
- In office 10 June 1886 – 25 June 1894

Member of the New South Wales Legislative Assembly for Moree
- In office 17 July 1894 – 11 June 1901

Personal details
- Born: Thomas Henry Hassall; 11 September 1844 Ashby-de-la-Zouch, Leicestershire, England
- Died: 17 February 1920 (aged 75) Natal, South Africa
- Resting place: Verulam Cemetery

Thomas Henry Hassall (11 September 1844 - 17 February 1920) was an Anglo-Australian politician.

== Early life ==
Born on 11 September 1844 in Ashby-de-la-Zouch, Leicestershire, England. He was educated at Loughborough Grammar School.

== Australia ==
Hassall arrived in Sydney in 1861 on board the White Start liner. He made his way up to Lambing Flat and after working in the interior as a miner, drover and contractor, settled in Moree in 1867. He was elected to the New South Wales Legislative Assembly in 1886 for the district of Gwydir, until its first abolition in 1894, and represented the replacement district of Moree until he retired in 1901. Hassall held the portfolio of Secretary for Lands in the Lyne ministry, from 1899 to 1901.

== South Africa ==
In 1901 Hassall moved to the Colony of Natal. He was associated with the Federal Cold Storage but deciding on a quiet life, he became a country hotel keeper in Natal. In 1915 he settled at Chelmsford Hotel, Tongaat, on the Natal north coast.

After a long illness, he died on Tuesday 17 February 1920, at his residence, Chelmsford Hotel, and was buried at Verulam Cemetery.

Parliament of New South Wales
Political offices
Preceded by James Young	Secretary for Lands; 1889–1901	Succeeded by Paddy Crick
New South Wales Legislative Assembly
Preceded by William Campbell	Member for Gwydir; 1886–1894	District abolished
New district	Member for Moree; 1894–1901	Succeeded by William Webster
