= Electoral district of Inverell =

Former state electoral district of New South Wales, Australia

Inverell was an electoral district of the Legislative Assembly in the Australian state of New South Wales, created in 1880 and including Inverell. It was abolished in 1904, with the downsizing of the Legislative Assembly after Federation, and was largely replaced by Gwydir.

== Members for Inverell ==
Member	Party	Term
Richard Murray	None	1880–1885
Samuel Moore	None	1885–1887
Samuel Moore	Free Trade	1887–1889
George Cruickshank	Protectionist	1889–1901
William McIntyre	Protectionist	1901–1902
George Jones	Labour	1902–1904

== Election results ==
1902 Inverell by-election Saturday 31 May
Party	Candidate	Votes	%	±%
Labour	George Jones	471	37.7	
Progressive	James McIlveen	447	35.8	
Independent	William Wall	331	26.5	
Total formal votes		1,249	99.5	
Informal votes		6	0.5	
Turnout		1,255	50.7 (Note: Estimate based on an electoral roll of 2,477 at the 1901 election.)	
Labour gain from Progressive				

William McIntyre (Progressive) died.
