= William Webster (Australian politician) =

Australian politician (1860–1936)

The Honourable William Webster
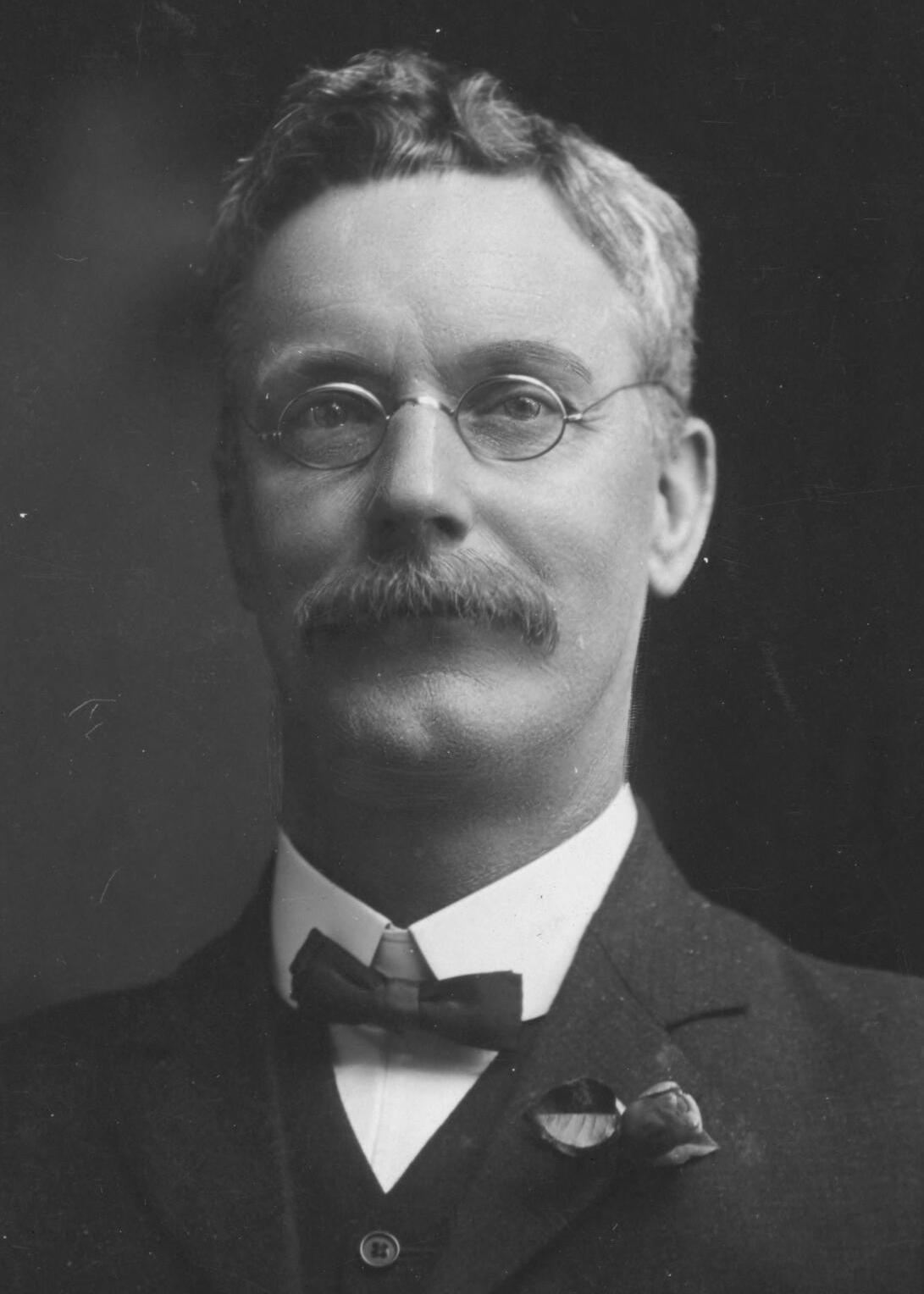

Postmaster-General of Australia
- In office 27 October 1915 – 3 February 1920
- Prime Minister: Billy Hughes
- Preceded by: William Spence
- Succeeded by: George Wise

Member of the Australian Parliament for Gwydir
- In office 16 December 1903 – 13 December 1919
- Preceded by: George Cruickshank
- Succeeded by: Lou Cunningham

Personal details
- Born: 7 June 1860 Everton, Lancashire, England
- Died: 3 October 1936 (aged 76) Parramatta, New South Wales, Australia
- Party: Labor (to 1916); National Labor (1916–1917); Nationalist (from 1917)
- Spouse: Jane Buckney (m. 1883)
- Occupation: Unionist

William Webster (7 June 1860 – 3 October 1936) was an Australian politician. He began his career in the Australian Labor Party (ALP), serving a single term in the New South Wales Legislative Assembly (1901–1903) before winning election to the House of Representatives at the 1903 federal election. He served as Postmaster-General in the Hughes government from 1915 to 1920. He left the ALP during the 1916 party split and remained in parliament as a Nationalist until his defeat in 1919.

== Early life ==
Born in Everton, Lancashire, England, he was the son of John Webster, a labourer, and Elizabeth, née Poynton. Leaving school at 13, Webster migrated to New South Wales in 1879 and, having quarried stone at Pyrmont and saved prodigiously, was able to bring the rest of his family to Sydney. By the next year he was financial secretary of the Trades and Labor Council. He married Jane Buckney on 7 June 1883 at Marrickville, and the firm he founded, Webster Bros, was one of the first in New South Wales to observe the standard wage and eight-hour day.

== Politics ==
Webster was a member of Marrickville Municipal Council from 1887, and stood for the New South Wales Legislative Assembly seats of Canterbury, Petersham, Wickham, and Marrickville, only to be defeated in all of them. Although he had opposed Federation, he contested the seat of Gwydir in 1901 in an attempt to enter the Australian House of Representatives, but was unsuccessful. However, from 1901 to 1903 he was the first Labor member for Moree in the Legislative Assembly, and as a result of his success was elected to the seat of Gwydir in 1903. He was known for always answering letters and requests from his constituents personally.

His role in the royal commission on postal services was significant, and was in part responsible for the downfall of the Deakin government. On 9 July 1909, as part of these pursuits, Webster delivered a renowned speech lasting 10 hours and 57 minutes, a record which, under new time limits, can never be broken. As a result of this he became known as "the man with the iron jaw". He was Postmaster-General in the first Hughes government, and together with his Prime Minister he left the Labor Party in 1916 over conscription to join the new Nationalist Party of Australia. He retained his place in the government until the 1919 election, at which he was defeated.

== Later life ==
Webster retired to Wentworthville and played no further part in politics. He died at Parramatta on 8 October 1936 and was survived by his wife, a daughter and two sons.

New South Wales Legislative Assembly
Preceded by Thomas Hassall	Member for Moree; 1901–1903	Succeeded by Percy Stirton
Political offices
Preceded by William Spence	Postmaster-General; 1915–1920	Succeeded by George Wise
Parliament of Australia
Preceded by George Cruickshank	Member for Gwydir; 1903–1919	Succeeded by Lou Cunningham
