= George Jones (Australian politician) =

Australian politician

George Alfred Jones (1866 – 8 April 1938) was an Australian politician.

He was born in Inverell to schoolmaster Robert Brown and Helen Moore. He married Frances Louisa Durnford around 1891 at Surry Hills; they had three children. A printer, he was president of the Typographical Association from 1897 to 1901, and worked with various newspapers. In 1902 he was elected to the New South Wales Legislative Assembly as the Labor member for Inverell. He transferred to Gwydir in 1904 and served until his defeat in 1913. Jones died at Bondi in 1938.

New South Wales Legislative Assembly
Preceded by William McIntyre	Member for Inverell; 1902–1904	Abolished
New seat	Member for Gwydir; 1904–1913	Succeeded by John Crane
