= Electoral district of Gwydir =

Former state electoral district of New South Wales, Australia

The Gwydir was an electoral district of the Legislative Assembly in the Australian state of New South Wales, created in 1859, when Liverpool Plains and Gwydir was divided, and named after and including the Gwydir River. In 1894 it was abolished and largely replaced by Moree and Barwon. It was re-created in the 1904 re-distribution of electorates following the 1903 New South Wales referendum, which required the number of members of the Legislative Assembly to be reduced from 125 to 90. It consisted of the abolished seat of Moree and part of Inverell. It was abolished in 1920, with the introduction of proportional representation and largely merged, along with Tamworth, into Namoi.

== Members for Gwydir ==
First incarnation (1859–1894)
| Member | Party | Term |
|---|---|---|
| Richard Jenkins | None | 1859–1860 |
| Francis Rusden | None | 1860–1864 |
| Thomas Dangar | None | 1864–1880 |
| William Campbell | None | 1880–1886 |
| Thomas Hassall | None | 1886–1887 |
| Thomas Hassall | Protectionist | 1887–1894 |
Second incarnation (1904–1920)
| Member | Party | Term |
| George Jones | Labour | 1904–1913 |
| John Crane | Farmers and Settlers | 1913–1917 |
| John Crane | Nationalist | 1917–1920 |

== Election results ==
1917 New South Wales state election: Gwydir
| Party | Candidate | Votes | % | ±% |
|---|---|---|---|---|
| Nationalist | John Crane | 3,542 | 59.2 | +4.4 |
| Labor | William Scully | 2,440 | 40.8 | −4.4 |
| Total formal votes | | 5,982 | 99.4 | +2.0 |
| Informal votes | | 38 | 0.6 | −2.0 |
| Turnout | | 6,020 | 61.0 | −2.2 |
| Nationalist hold | | Swing | +4.4 | |
