= Electoral results for the district of Bendigo East =

Victoria, Australia, district election results

This is a list of electoral results for the district of Bendigo East in Victorian state elections.

== Members for Bendigo East ==
First incarnation (1904–1927)
Member	Party	Term
Alfred Shrapnell Bailes	Unaligned	1904–1907
Thomas Glass	Labour	1907–1911
Alfred Hampson	Labor	1911–1915
Luke Clough	Labor	1915–1927
Second incarnation (1985–present)
Member	Party	Term
Michael John	Liberal	1985–1999
Jacinta Allan	Labor	1999–present

== Election results ==
=== Elections in the 2020s ===
==== 2022 ====
2022 Victorian state election: Bendigo East
Party	Candidate	Votes	%	±%
Labor	Jacinta Allan	22,010	48.3	−2.0
Liberal	Darin Schade	12,478	27.4	+6.5
Greens	Michael Tolhurst	3,944	8.7	+0.7
One Nation	Ben Mihail	2,597	5.7	+5.7
Ind. (Australia One)	James Laurie	1,603	3.5	+3.5
Animal Justice	Vyonne McLelland-Howe	1,574	3.5	+3.5
Family First	Evelyn Keetelaar	1,362	3.0	+3.0
Total formal votes		45,568	95.4	−0.2
Informal votes		2,184	4.6	+0.2
Turnout		47,752	89.9	−2.3
Two-party-preferred result
Labor	Jacinta Allan	27,727	60.8	−1.3
Liberal	Darin Schade	17,841	39.2	+1.3
Labor hold		Swing	−1.3	

=== Elections in the 2010s ===
==== 2018 ====
2018 Victorian state election: Bendigo East
Party	Candidate	Votes	%	±%
Labor	Jacinta Allan	21,693	50.35	+4.07
Liberal	Ian Ellis	8,987	20.86	−20.06
National	Gaelle Broad	6,864	15.93	+15.93
Greens	Nakita Thomson	3,465	8.04	+0.76
Democratic Labour	Helen Leach	1,080	2.51	+2.51
Independent	Michael Belardinelli	999	2.32	+2.32
Total formal votes		43,088	95.62	−0.90
Informal votes		1,976	4.38	+0.90
Turnout		45,064	92.16	−2.79
Two-party-preferred result
Labor	Jacinta Allan	26,776	62.11	+7.12
Liberal	Ian Ellis	16,332	37.89	−7.12
Labor hold		Swing	+7.12	

==== 2014 ====
2014 Victorian state election: Bendigo East
Party	Candidate	Votes	%	±%
Labor	Jacinta Allan	18,651	46.3	+3.1
Liberal	Greg Bickley	16,492	40.9	+6.9
Greens	Jennifer Alden	2,935	7.3	+1.0
Family First	Glenis Bradshaw	963	2.4	+1.1
Country Alliance	Cameron Dowling	714	1.8	−1.7
Rise Up Australia	Lynette Bell	550	1.4	+1.4
Total formal votes		40,305	96.5	+1.2
Informal votes		1,456	3.5	−1.2
Turnout		41,761	95.0	+2.3
Two-party-preferred result
Labor	Jacinta Allan	22,187	55.0	+1.9
Liberal	Greg Bickley	18,118	45.0	−1.9
Labor hold		Swing	+1.9	

==== 2010 ====
2010 Victorian state election: Bendigo East
Party	Candidate	Votes	%	±%
Labor	Jacinta Allan	16,079	43.85	−3.03
Liberal	Michael Langdon	12,864	35.08	+0.56
Greens	Tim Bardsley	2,295	6.26	−0.94
National	Peter Schwarz	2,196	5.99	−0.42
Country Alliance	Rod Leunig	1,275	3.48	+3.48
Sex Party	Gary Hillier	824	2.25	+2.25
Family First	Belinda Guerra	447	1.22	−3.12
Democratic Labor	James Stewart	412	1.12	+1.12
Christian Democrats	Ben Veitz	275	0.75	+0.75
Total formal votes		36,667	95.25	−0.78
Informal votes		1,827	4.75	+0.78
Turnout		38,494	94.51	+0.75
Two-party-preferred result
Labor	Jacinta Allan	19,797	53.82	−1.53
Liberal	Michael Langdon	16,989	46.18	+1.53
Labor hold		Swing	−1.53	

=== Elections in the 2000s ===
==== 2006 ====
2006 Victorian state election: Bendigo East
Party	Candidate	Votes	%	±%
Labor	Jacinta Allan	16,038	46.88	−9.55
Liberal	Kevin Gibbins	11,809	34.52	+6.6
Greens	John Bardsley	2,464	7.20	+0.54
National	John Manning	2,193	6.41	−2.57
Family First	Gail Hardy	1,486	4.34	+4.34
People Power	Colin James	224	0.65	+0.65
Total formal votes		34,214	96.03	−2.10
Informal votes		1,413	3.97	+2.10
Turnout		35,627	93.76	−1.00
Two-party-preferred result
Labor	Jacinta Allan	19,008	55.35	−7.61
Liberal	Kevin Gibbins	15,332	44.65	+7.61
Labor hold		Swing	−7.61	

==== 2002 ====
2002 Victorian state election: Bendigo East
Party	Candidate	Votes	%	±%
Labor	Jacinta Allan	18,639	56.4	+8.0
Liberal	Lisa Ruffell	9,223	27.9	−16.2
National	Tracee Spiby	2,966	9.0	+9.0
Greens	David Petersen	2,201	6.7	+1.8
Total formal votes		33,029	98.1	−0.1
Informal votes		631	1.9	+0.1
Turnout		33,660	94.8	−0.7
Two-party-preferred result
Labor	Jacinta Allan	20,795	63.0	+10.1
Liberal	Lisa Ruffell	12,232	37.0	−10.1
Labor hold		Swing	+10.1	

=== Elections in the 1990s ===
==== 1999 ====
1999 Victorian state election: Bendigo East
Party	Candidate	Votes	%	±%
Labor	Jacinta Allan	15,478	48.4	+6.6
Liberal	Michael John	14,123	44.2	−8.1
Greens	Bruce Rivendell	1,552	4.9	+4.9
Reform	Alf Thorpe	828	2.6	+2.6
Total formal votes		31,981	98.3	−0.4
Informal votes		567	1.7	+0.4
Turnout		32,548	95.5	+0.8
Two-party-preferred result
Labor	Jacinta Allan	16,977	53.1	+8.1
Liberal	Michael John	15,004	46.9	−8.1
Labor gain from Liberal		Swing	+8.1	

==== 1996 ====
1996 Victorian state election: Bendigo East
Party	Candidate	Votes	%	±%
Liberal	Michael John	16,035	52.3	−1.6
Labor	Julie Flynn	12,803	41.8	+4..9
Independent	Geoff Ferns	1,107	3.6	+3.6
Natural Law	Susan Griffith	712	2.3	+2.3
Total formal votes		30,657	98.7	+0.9
Informal votes		406	1.3	−0.9
Turnout		31,063	94.7	−1.6
Two-party-preferred result
Liberal	Michael John	16,842	55.0	−4.1
Labor	Julie Flynn	13,771	45.0	+4.1
Liberal hold		Swing	−4.1	

==== 1992 ====
1992 Victorian state election: Bendigo East
Party	Candidate	Votes	%	±%
Liberal	Michael John	15,755	53.9	+13.6
Labor	Bill Murray	10,760	36.8	−4.9
Independent	Michael Carty	1,651	5.7	+5.7
Independent	Gayle Joyberry	1,042	3.6	+3.6
Total formal votes		29,208	97.8	−0.1
Informal votes		649	2.2	+0.1
Turnout		29,857	96.3	
Two-party-preferred result
Liberal	Michael John	17,245	59.1	+4.0
Labor	Bill Murray	11,959	40.9	−4.0
Liberal hold		Swing	+4.0	

=== Elections in the 1980s ===
==== 1988 ====
1988 Victorian state election: Bendigo East
Party	Candidate	Votes	%	±%
Labor	Bob Cameron	12,179	41.09	−3.15
Liberal	Michael John	12,010	40.52	+1.82
National	Leon Waddington	3,908	13.19	−3.87
Call to Australia	Vic Upson	1,541	5.20	+5.20
Total formal votes		29,638	97.97	−0.45
Informal votes		614	2.03	+0.45
Turnout		30,252	93.75	−1.47
Two-party-preferred result
Liberal	Michael John	16,505	55.70	+1.81
Labor	Bob Cameron	13,127	44.30	−1.81
Liberal hold		Swing	+1.81	

==== 1985 ====
1985 Victorian state election: Bendigo East
Party	Candidate	Votes	%	±%
Labor	John Reid	12,493	44.2	+1.9
Liberal	Michael John	10,929	38.7	−2.8
National	Barry McNaught	4,819	17.1	+13.2
Total formal votes		28,241	98.4	
Informal votes		452	1.6	
Turnout		28,693	95.2	
Two-party-preferred result
Liberal	Michael John	15,218	53.9	+2.6
Labor	John Reid	13,023	46.1	−2.6
Liberal hold		Swing	+2.6	

==== 1924 ====
1924 Victorian state election: Bendigo East
Party	Candidate	Votes	%	±%
Labor	Luke Clough	3,327	60.2	+0.2
Nationalist	John Michelsen	2,202	39.8	−0.2
Total formal votes		5,529	99.5	+0.2
Informal votes		28	0.5	−0.2
Turnout		5,557	67.7	+5.8
Labor hold		Swing	+0.2	

==== 1921 ====
1921 Victorian state election: Bendigo East
Party	Candidate	Votes	%	±%
Labor	Luke Clough	3,250	60.0	+1.4
Nationalist	Tom Brennan	2,163	40.0	−1.4
Total formal votes		5,413	99.3	+1.0
Informal votes		39	0.7	−1.0
Turnout		5,452	61.9	−9.1
Labor hold		Swing	+1.4	

==== 1920 ====
1920 Victorian state election: Bendigo East
Party	Candidate	Votes	%	±%
Labor	Luke Clough	3,409	58.6	+3.5
Nationalist	Edwin Ham	2,410	41.4	−3.5
Total formal votes		5,819	98.3	+0.6
Informal votes		103	1.7	−0.6
Turnout		5,922	71.0	+5.1
Labor hold		Swing	+3.5	

=== Elections in the 1910s ===
==== 1917 ====
1917 Victorian state election: Bendigo East
Party	Candidate	Votes	%	±%
Labor	Luke Clough	3,112	55.1	−2.7
Nationalist	Walter McRobert	1,640	29.1	
Nationalist	Thomas Currie	892	15.8	
Total formal votes		5,634	97.7	+0.6
Informal votes		132	2.3	−0.6
Turnout		5,766	65.9	+6.8
Two-party-preferred result
Labor	Luke Clough		56.7	−1.1
Nationalist	Walter McRobert		43.3	+1.1
Labor hold		Swing	−1.1	

- Two party preferred vote was estimated.

==== 1915 by-election ====
The 1915 Bendigo East state by-election was held on 4 February 1915 following the resignation of incumbent MP Alfred Hampson. Hampson, a Labor Party member, resigned in order to contest the federal Bendigo by-election, which he won days later on 6 February.

1915 Bendigo East state by-election
Party	Candidate	Votes	%	±%
Labor	Luke Clough	2,813	52.5	−5.3
Liberal	David Andrew	2,540	47.5	+5.3
Total formal votes		5,353	97.0	−0.1
Informal votes		167	3.0	+0.1
Turnout		5,520	58.1	−1.0
Labor hold		Swing	−5.3	

==== 1914 ====
1914 Victorian state election: Bendigo East
Party	Candidate	Votes	%	±%
Labor	Alfred Hampson	3,126	57.8	−1.4
Liberal	John Curnow	2,287	42.2	+16.4
Total formal votes		5,413	97.1	−1.3
Informal votes		164	2.9	+1.3
Turnout		5,577	59.1	−2.4
Labor hold		Swing	−2.9	

==== 1911 ====
1911 Victorian state election: Bendigo East
Party	Candidate	Votes	%	±%
Labor	Alfred Hampson	3,380	59.2	+4.1
Liberal	Luke Murphy	1,475	25.8	−19.1
Independent Liberal	George Knight	850	14.9	+14.9
Total formal votes		5,705	98.4	−1.2
Informal votes		95	1.6	+1.2
Turnout		5,800	61.5	+5.6
Two-party-preferred result
Labor	Alfred Hampson		60.7	+5.6
Liberal	Luke Murphy		39.3	−5.6
Labor hold		Swing	+5.6	

- Two party preferred vote was estimated.
