= Ezekiel (name) =

- Gender: Male

Origin
- Origin: Hebrew
- Meaning: "God will strengthen"

Other names
- Variant forms: Ezequiel, Yehezkel, Ezechiel, Ezechiele
- Short forms: Zeke, Hezi

Ezekiel is a masculine Hebrew language name, meaning "God's Strength." It can be used as both a given name and a surname.

== List of people ==
Notable people with the name include:

=== Given name ===
- Ezekiel (c. 622 – c. 570 BCE), Hebrew prophet of the Old Testament
- Ezekiel (Nestorian patriarch), patriarch of the Church of the East 570–581
- Ezekiel the Tragedian (2nd century BCE), author of Greek tragedies on biblical matters
- Ezekiel Afon, Nigerian politician
- Ezekiel Ansah (born 1989), Ghanaian football player
- Ezekiel Bacon (1776–1870), American lawyer and politician from Massachusetts and New York
- Ezekiel S. Candler Jr. (1862–1944), American politician from Mississippi
- Ezekiel F. Chambers (1788–1867), American politician from Maryland
- Ezekiel Elliott (born 1995), American football player
- Ezekiel Abraham Ezekiel (1757–1806), English engraver
- Ezekiel C. Gathings (1903–1979), American politician from Arkansas
- Ezekiel Hart (1767–1843), British North America entrepreneur and politician
- Ezekiel B. Hart (c. 1795–1814), American naval officer
- Ezekiel Henty (born 1993), Nigerian footballer
- Ezekiel Kemboi (born 1982), Kenyan athlete
- Ezekiel Maige (born 1970), Tanzanian politician
- Zeke Moreno (born 1978), American football player
- Zeke Mowatt (born 1961), American football player

=== Surname ===
- Ezekiel Abraham Ezekiel (1757–1806), English engraver
- Florence Ezekiel (1932–2006), known as Nadira, Indian actress
- Imoh Ezekiel (born 1993), Nigerian football player
- Judah bar Ezekiel (220–299 CE), Babylonian amora
- Mordecai Ezekiel (1899–1974), American economist
- Moses Jacob Ezekiel (1844–1917), American sculptor
- Nissim Ezekiel (1924–2004), Indian poet, playwright, and art critic
- Sarah Ezekiel (born 1965), artist diagnosed with ALS

=== Stage name ===
- Ezekiel Jackson (b. 1978), ring name of professional wrestler Rycklon Stephens, best known for competing in WWE
- Ezekiel (b. 1987), ring name of professional wrestler Jeffrey Sciullo, currently signed to WWE and best known as Elias

== Fictional characters ==
- Ezekiel Sims, a character from Marvel's Spider-Man comics
- Ezekiel, a fallen angel from the TV series Supernatural
- Ezekiel Bloor, a character in Jenny Nimmo's Children of the Red King
- Ezekiel Cheever, a character in Arthur Miller's play The Crucible
- Ezekiel Rage, an overzealous antagonist from The Real Adventures of Jonny Quest
- Ezekiel "Zeke" Stane, a character from Marvel's Iron Man comics
- Ezekiel Zick from the Monster Allergy comic book and TV series
- King Ezekiel, a character in The Walking Dead franchise
- Ezekiel, a character from the Total Drama series
- Ezekiel Figuero, the protagonist of The Get Down
- Ezekiel Jones, a main character on the television series The Librarians, portrayed by John Harlan Kim
- Ezekiel “Easy” Boudreau, lawyer and one of the main characters in the television series Proven Innocent, portrayed by Russell Hornsby
- Ezekiel “EZ” Reyes, main character in the television series Mayans M.C., portrayed by J. D. Pardo
- Ezekiel Pedrad, "Zeke" character in book series "Divergent"
- Ezekiel Abaddon "the Despoiler", Warmaster of Chaos in Warhammer 40,000
- Ezekiel is a character who only appears once in the adult animation series Aqua Teen Hunger Force
- Ezekiel is the protagonist of the sapphic, psychological horror Visual Novel Seraphim Slum

== See also ==
- Ezekiel (disambiguation)
- Hezekiah ("YHWH" version of the name)
- Yehezkel (name)
