= 2019 Plateau State House of Assembly election =

State election in Nigeria

The 2019 Plateau State House of Assembly election was held on 9 March 2019, to elect members of the Plateau State House of Assembly in Nigeria. All the 24 seats were up for election in the Plateau State House of Assembly.

Abok Ayuba from APC representing Jos East constituency was elected Speaker, while Saleh Yipmong from APC representing Dengi constituency was elected Deputy Speaker.

== Results ==
The result of the election is listed below.

- Peter Ibrahim Gyendeng from PDP won Barkin-Ladi constituency
- Musa Agah Avia from PDP won Rukuba/Irigwe constituency
- Amurudu Atew Usaini from APC won Bokkos constituency
- Abok Ayuba from APC won Jos East constituency
- Ibrahim Baba Hassan from APC won Jos North-North constituency
- Mrs Dusu Esther Simi from PDP won Jos North-West constituency
- Dalyop Gwottson F. from PDP won Jos South constituency
- Wallk Philip Goma from APC won Kanke constituency
- Dasun Philip Peter from APC won Pankshin North constituency
- Henry Soembis Longs from APC won Pankshin South constituency
- Saleh Yipmong from APC won Dengi constituency
- Ismaila Hudu Bala from APC won Kantana constituency
- Pirfa Jingfa Tyem from PDP won Langtang North-North constituency
- Daniel Nanbol Listick from PDP won Langtang Central constituency
- Zimtim Sochang from PDP won Langtang South constituency
- Bala Fwanje N. from PDP won Mangu South constituency
- Abdul Adamu Yanga from APC won Mangu North-East constituency
- Naanlong Gapyil Daniel from APC won Mikang constituency
- Eric Piangat Dakogol from APC won Qua'an Pan North constituency
- Abubakar Mohammed N from APC won Qua’an Pan South constituency
- Timothy Dantong from PDP won Riyom constituency
- Kwapfuan Livinus James from APC won Shendam constituency
- Yahaya Adamu from APC won Wase constituency
- Ezekiel Afon from APC won Pengana constituency
