= Exequiel =

Exequiel is a masculine given name. Notable people with the name include:

- Exequiel Benavídez (born 1989), Argentine footballer
- Exequiel Javier (born 1946), Filipino politician

== See also ==
- Ezequiel
