= Saleh Shehu Yipmong =

Nigerian professional surveyor and politician

Rt Hon Saleh Shehu Yipmong
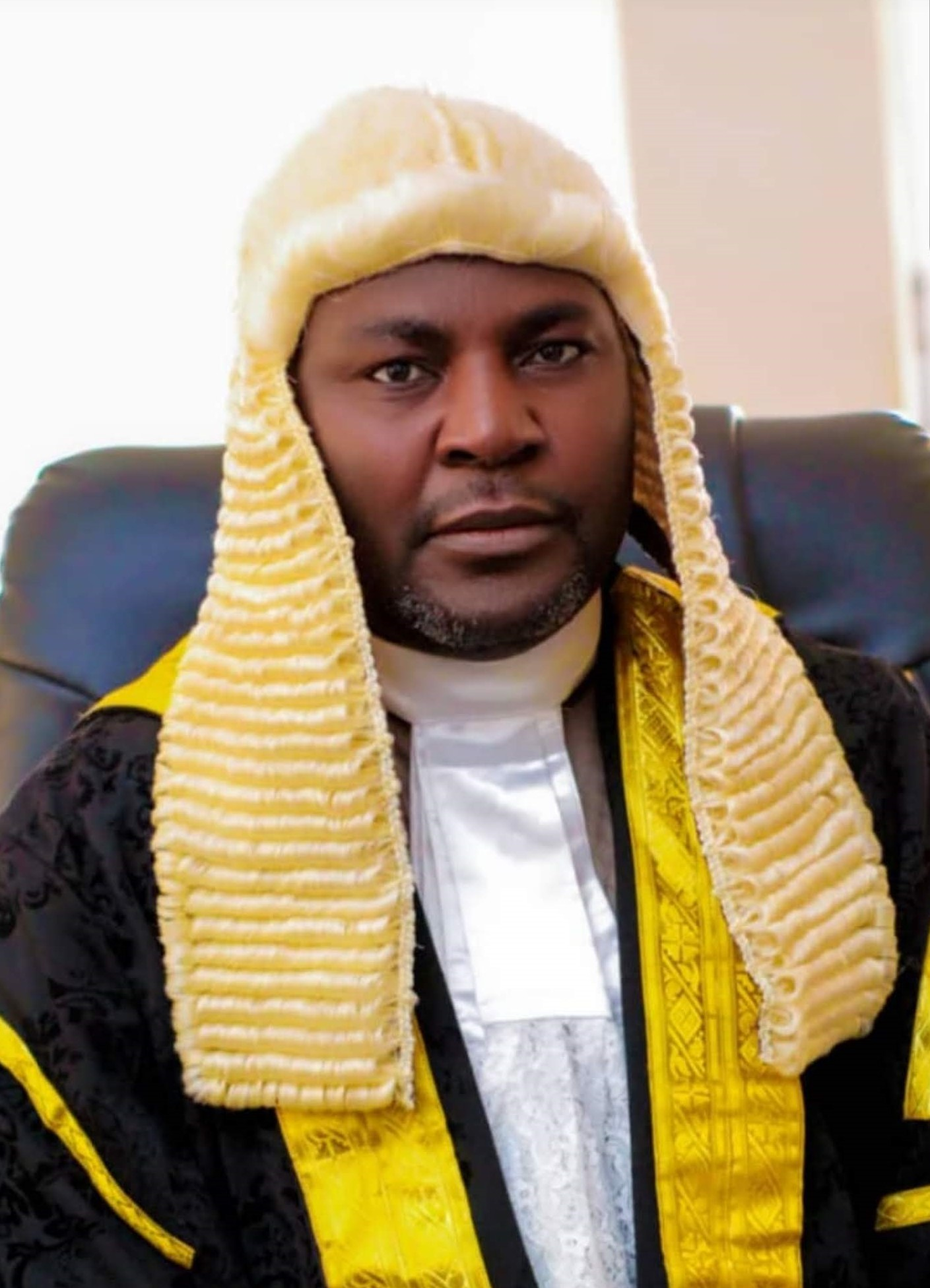

Deputy Speaker of the Plateau State House of Assembly Served with Speakers: Peter Azi, Joshua Madaki, Abok Ayuba, Yakubu Sanda
- In office April 2017 – 5 June 2023
- Governor: Simon Lalong
- Preceded by: Yusuf Adamu Gagdi
- Succeeded by: Fom Gwottson

Member of the Governing Council of Plateau State Polytechnic, Barkin Ladi Council Chairman: Hayward Mafuyai
- Incumbent
- Assumed office February 2025
- Governor: Caleb Mutfwang

Member of the Plateau State House of Assembly for Dengi Constituency
- In office 5 June 2015 – 5 June 2023
- Succeeded by: Idris Kalamu Dal
- Constituency: Dengi

Chairman of the House Committee on Land, Survey and Planning
- In office 2015–2023

Chairman of the House Committee on Finance
- In office 2019–2023

Chairman of the House Committee on Works
- In office 2015–2023

Chairman of the House Committee on Special Duties
- In office 2019–2023

Personal details
- Born: 26 December 1973 (age 52) Kunkyam, Dengi District, Kanam, Plateau State, Nigeria
- Party: All Progressives Congress (APC)
- Education: Federal Polytechnic, Bauchi
- Profession: Surveyor, politician

Saleh Shehu Yipmong (born 26 December 1973) is a Nigerian professional surveyor and politician who served as the Deputy Speaker of the Plateau State House of Assembly from 2017 to 2023. Representing the Dengi Constituency under the platform of the All Progressives Congress (APC), Yipmong is recognized as the longest-serving Deputy Speaker in the history of the Plateau State legislature, having successfully navigated the tenures of four different Speakers. He currently serves as a member of the Governing Council of the Plateau State Polytechnic.

== Early life and education ==
Saleh Shehu Yipmong was born on 26 December 1973 in Kunkyam, located within the Dengi District of the Kanam Local Government Area of Plateau State, Nigeria. He was born into a prominent regional lineage; his uncle (his father's twin brother) is His Royal Highness Shehu Yipmong, the traditional ruler holding the title of the Pangkwal Yipmong.

Yipmong acquired his secondary education at Government Secondary School (GSS) Langtang. He subsequently proceeded to the Federal Polytechnic, Bauchi, where he underwent professional training in surveying, culminating in his certification as a professional surveyor (Surv.).

== Professional career ==
Prior to entering public service, Yipmong practiced actively within the surveying sector. His professional standing was formally acknowledged in February 2025 by the Nigeria Institution of Surveyors (NIS), Plateau State Branch, which celebrated his technical expertise, dedication, and professional contributions to infrastructural development planning within the region.

== Legislative career ==
=== Entry into politics and First Term (2015–2019) ===
Yipmong commenced his mainstream political career during the 2015 Nigerian general election, contesting and winning the seat to represent the Dengi Constituency in the 8th Plateau State House of Assembly under the platform of the All Progressives Congress (APC).

In April 2017, following the impeachment of the incumbent Deputy Speaker, Yusuf Adamu Gagdi, Yipmong was elected by his legislative colleagues to occupy the office of the Deputy Speaker. During his inaugural term, he worked collaboratively alongside Speaker Peter Ajang Azi and subsequently Speaker Joshua Azi Madaki to steer the legislative affairs of the state.

=== Second Term and 9th Assembly Stability (2019–2023) ===
Yipmong secured a second consecutive term during the 2019 Plateau State House of Assembly election. Following the inauguration of the 9th Assembly on 10 June 2019, he was re-elected unopposed by the parliament to continue serving as the Deputy Speaker, alongside the newly elected Speaker, Abok Nuhu Ayuba.

Yipmong was heavily involved in navigating complex leadership transitions within the state parliament to maintain institutional stability. Notably, during the leadership changes of October 2021, Yipmong presided over the legislative sessions that saw the emergence of Yakubu Sanda as the new Speaker. By the conclusion of his second term in June 2023, he had served alongside four distinct Speakers, solidifying his standing as the state’s longest-serving Deputy Speaker.

=== House Committee Chairmanships ===
Throughout his tenures in the House of Assembly, Yipmong exercised significant oversight legislative authority, serving as the substantive Chairman of several key standing committees, including:

- House Committee on Finance: Spearheaded oversight functions concerning state revenue generation, budgetary frameworks, and fiscal policy implementations.
- House Committee on Works: Monitored public infrastructural development, structural engineering deployments, and state contract oversight.
- House Committee on Land, Survey and Planning: Utilized his background as a professional surveyor to drive policy formulations, land administration, and urban development frameworks across the state.
- House Committee on Special Duties: Chaired legislative initiatives relating to urgent state matters, inter-governmental coordination, and emergency response infrastructure.

== Legislative and political stances ==
=== Local government autonomy ===
Yipmong was a vocal proponent of structural reforms at the grassroots level. During his tenure as Deputy Speaker, he publicly threw his weight behind the constitutional amendment seeking absolute local government autonomy in Nigeria, advocating that self-determination for Local Government Areas (LGAs) is central to rural development.

=== Internal party democracy ===
Yipmong consistently advocated for the preservation of integrity within internal party election mechanisms. He actively supervised and defended the transparency of the APC's grassroots nomination structures, notably ensuring compliance and refuting claims of irregularity during local council primaries.

== Post-Assembly and national assignments ==
Ahead of the 2023 Nigerian general election, Yipmong initially declared his intent to contest for the Plateau Central Senatorial District seat under the platform of the APC. However, he voluntarily withdrew his aspiration in a strategic move to consolidate party unity and ensure a unified front behind the party’s eventual senatorial candidate, Diket Plang.

Following his senatorial withdrawal, Yipmong took on a major strategic role within the APC campaign framework for the 2023 Plateau State gubernatorial election. He was appointed as the Director General (DG) of Operations for the Generation Next Campaign Council, taking charge of field organization, logistical networks, and deployment strategies across the state's 17 local government areas in support of the party's governorship candidate, Dr. Nentawe Yilwatda.

In February 2025, the Executive Governor of Plateau State, Caleb Mutfwang, appointed Yipmong as a member of the Governing Council of the Plateau State Polytechnic, Barkin Ladi (PLAPOLY), serving alongside council chairman Professor Hayward Mafuyai.

In May 2026, the National Working Committee of the All Progressives Congress appointed Yipmong to a high-profile national assignment as the Chairman of the APC House of Representatives Primary Election Committee for Lagos State. On 16 May 2026, he led the committee at the APC State Secretariat in Ikeja, coordinating electoral processes across all 24 federal constituencies in Lagos State, emphasizing institutional guidelines, fair play, and internal party consensus building.
