= Thomas Glass (physician) =

English physician and medical writer

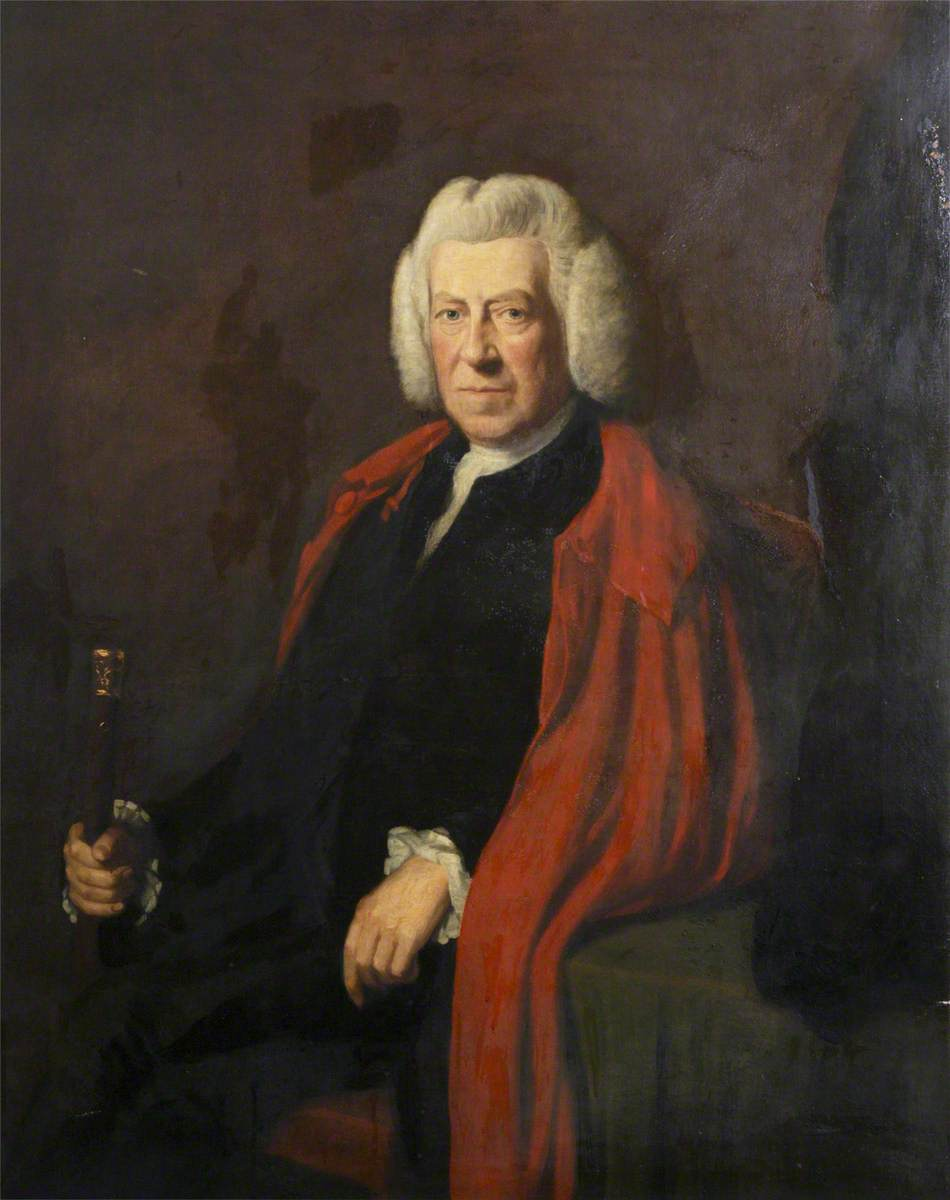
- Portrait by John Opie (c. 1780–1783)
- Born: 14 May 1709; Tiverton, Devon
- Died: 5 February 1786 (aged 76); Exeter
- Spouse: Mary Hodges (m. 1737)

Thomas Glass (1709–1786) was an English physician and medical writer.

== Life ==
Thomas Glass was born on 14 May 1709 in Tiverton, Devonshire, second of the nine children of Michael Glass, dyer, by his wife Elizabeth, daughter of John Handford. He was schooled initially at Tiverton by the clergyman John Moore, and afterwards at Exeter by André de Majendie, an émigré Huguenot pastor. He was entered as a medical student at Leyden on 29 October 1728, and graduated MD in July 1731. (Note: Dissertatio Medica Inauguralis, De Atrophia in genere, 4to, Leyden, 1731.)

On 10 February 1737 he married Mary (1715–1783), daughter of Sir Nathaniel Hodges, who died before him. They had four daughters: Mary (Mrs. Parminter), who predeceased her father, Elizabeth, Ann (Mrs. Lowder), and Melina or Melony (Mrs. Daniell). The Glasses lived first at Tiverton Castle, then moved in 1740 to Exeter, leasing part of Bedford House; in 1773 they moved to Bartholomew Yard, Exeter.

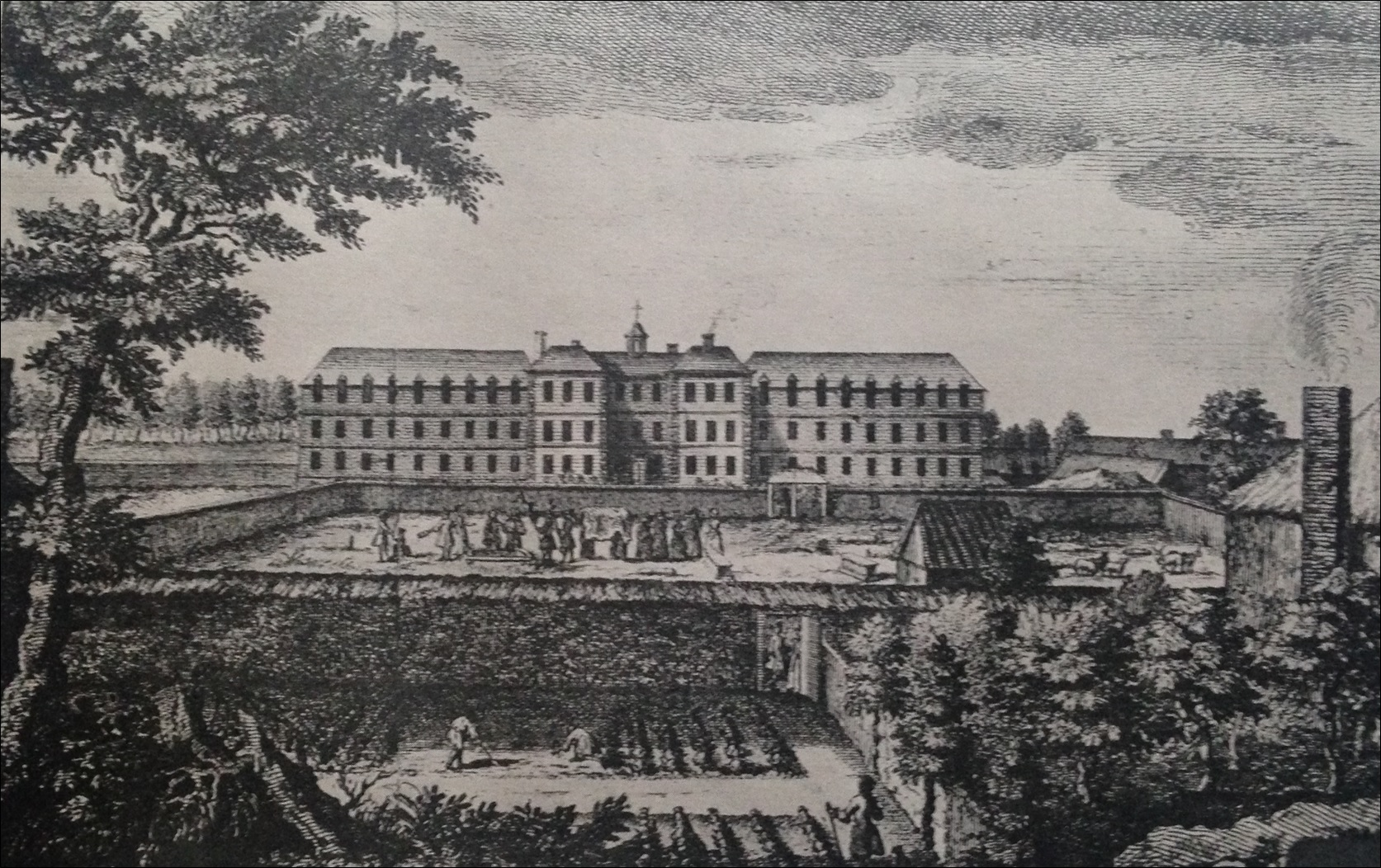
View of Devon and Exeter Hospital (1744)

Glass first practised medicine at Tiverton, and after moving to Exeter, he became a physician of the Devon and Exeter Hospital on its foundation and practised with great success there. To his brother Samuel Glass, a surgeon at Oxford, he imparted a process of preparing magnesia alba, an absorbent antacid and mild purgative which was particularly recommended for infants. Samuel perfected the preparation, published in 1764 an Essay on its use and salutary effects as a medicine, and derived a handsome profit from its sale. He ultimately sold the secret to Peter Delamotte. Meanwhile, in the summer of 1771, Thomas Henry, a Manchester apothecary, communicated to the College of Physicians what he maintained to be an "improved" method of preparing magnesia alba, and his paper was printed in the college Transactions.

After Samuel Glass's death on 25 February 1773, (Note: The Gentleman's Magazine, xliii. 155.) Henry published in the following May Strictures on the magnesia sold "under the name of the late Mr. Glass", alleging that it was not properly made, and advertising his own preparation as "genuine". Thomas Glass replied in An Examination of Mr. Henry's "Strictures" on Glass's Magnesia, 8vo, London, 1774, but was answered by Henry during the same year. In 1776 Glass was elected a foreign associate of the Société royale de médecine.

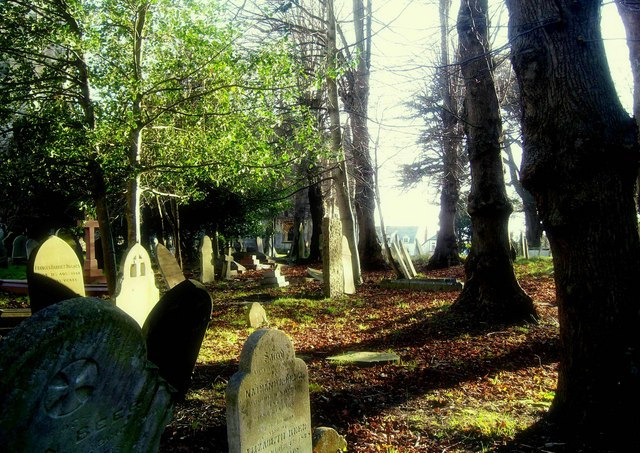
Part of St. David's churchyard

Glass died at Exeter on 5 February 1786 and was buried on 12 February in St. David's churchyard. His will, dated 8 November 1783, was proved at London on 27 February 1786. He bequeathed to the dean and chapter of Exeter all his "medical printed books", to be placed in their library for the use of any physician of the city. By a codicil dated 15 December 1784 he made provision for the education of poor children in Exeter.

== Appraisal ==
Glass was very highly regarded by his peers. In 1783 he received a laudatory address from eleven members of the Exeter Medical Society, who presented his portrait, painted by John Opie, to the hospital. The portrait hangs in the board-room of the Devon and Exeter Hospital, and was engraved by Ezekiel. (Note: Evans, Catalogue of Engraved Portraits, i. 139.) Glass was further honoured by election, uniquely for a physician, as president of the hospital in 1785. However, Bartholomew Parr, made a less generous assessment of his predecessor when he addressed a "society of gentlemen" in Exeter in 1795. This may have been because he disapproved of Glass's respect for Boerhaave and the "Ancients", or because Glass had failed to pass on any of his more affluent patients to Parr.

== Works ==
To Medical Observations and Inquiries (vi. 364) Glass contributed an Account of the Influenza, as it appeared at Exeter in 1775. He wrote also:

1. Commentarii duodecim de febribus ad Hippocratis disciplinam accommodati, 8vo, London, 1742 (Editio nova, curante Ern. Godofr. Baldinger, 8vo, Jena and Leipzig, 1771). This, Glass's principal work, was published in English as Twelve Commentaries on Fevers in 1752.
2. An Account of the antient baths, and their use in physic, 8vo, London, 1752.
3. A letter … to Dr. Baker on the means of procuring a distinct and favourable kind of small-pox, &c., 8vo, London, 1767.
4. A second letter … to Dr. Baker on certain methods of treating the small-pox during the eruptive state, 8vo, London, 1767.
5. Meditations upon the Attributes of God and the Nature of Man, 1770.
6. An Essay on Revealed Religion, 1772.

Glass was considered the greatest English authority after Sir William Watson on inoculation for the small-pox. A German translation of their combined papers was published at Halle in 1769. He left unpublished a "new edition" of the De Medicina of Celsus, based on the Rotterdam edition of 1750, which included a comprehensive commentary. Four large volumes of manuscript notes were subsequently kept in the Bodleian Library.

== Likenesses ==
- Thomas Hudson, oils, private collection.
- John Opie, oils, 1780–1783, Royal Devon and Exeter Hospital.
- Ezekiel Abraham Ezekiel, engraving, after Opie, Royal Albert Museum, Exeter.
