= Division of Bendigo =

Australian federal electoral division

Coordinates: 36.901°S 144.182°E

Bendigo Australian House of Representatives Division
- Interactive map of electorate boundaries from the 2025 federal election
- Created: 1901
- MP: Lisa Chesters
- Party: Labor
- Namesake: Bendigo, Victoria
- Electors: 120,140 (2025)
- Area: 6,178 km^{2} (2,385.3 sq mi)
- Demographic: Provincial
Electorates around Bendigo:
Mallee	Nicholls	Nicholls
Mallee	Bendigo	Nicholls
Ballarat	Ballarat	McEwen

The Division of Bendigo is an Australian electoral division in the state of Victoria. The division was proclaimed in 1900, and was one of the original 65 divisions to be contested at the first federal election. It is named for the city of Bendigo.

The division is situated on the northern foothills of the Great Dividing Range in North Central Victoria. It covers an area of approximately 5,496 square kilometres (2,122 sq mi) and provides the southern gateway to the Murray–Darling basin. In addition to the city of Bendigo, other large population centres in the division include Castlemaine, Heathcote and Kyneton.

The current Member for the Division of Bendigo, since the 2013 federal election, is Lisa Chesters, a member of the Australian Labor Party.

== Geography ==
Since 1984, federal electoral division boundaries in Australia have been determined at redistributions by a redistribution committee appointed by the Australian Electoral Commission. Redistributions occur for the boundaries of divisions in a particular state, and they occur every seven years, or sooner if a state's representation entitlement changes or when divisions of a state are malapportioned.

In 1913, it gained Maldon and Castlemaine from the abolished Division of Laanecoorie, but lost Heathcote. In 1937, with the abolition of the Division of Echuca, the division expanded north to the state border with New South Wales to include Echuca and Rochester. 12 years later in 1949, this was reversed with the creation of the Division of Murray around those areas.

In 1955, the division expanded east to include Seymour. In 1968, it expanded towards the south-east into other towns along the Calder Highway, such as Gisborne and Lancefield, and other towns along the Hume Highway, such as Kilmore and Wandong. The expansion replaced the northern part of Division of Lalor. Kilmore and Lancefield were lost to Division of Burke in 1977. In 1984, the division was significantly shifted west, losing all areas along the Hume Highway (Seymour, Kilmore and Wandong) to the new Division of McEwen.

In the 2024 redistribution, it was proposed in May 2024 that the division be expanded southwards towards the Shire of Hepburn and replacing parts of Division of Ballarat. However, in the final redistribution in October 2024, the division was instead expanded northwards into Shire of Campaspe and included the town of Rochester, which was previously in Division of Nicholls. A proposed expansion to the east into the towns of Toolborac and Pyalong also went ahead.

== History ==
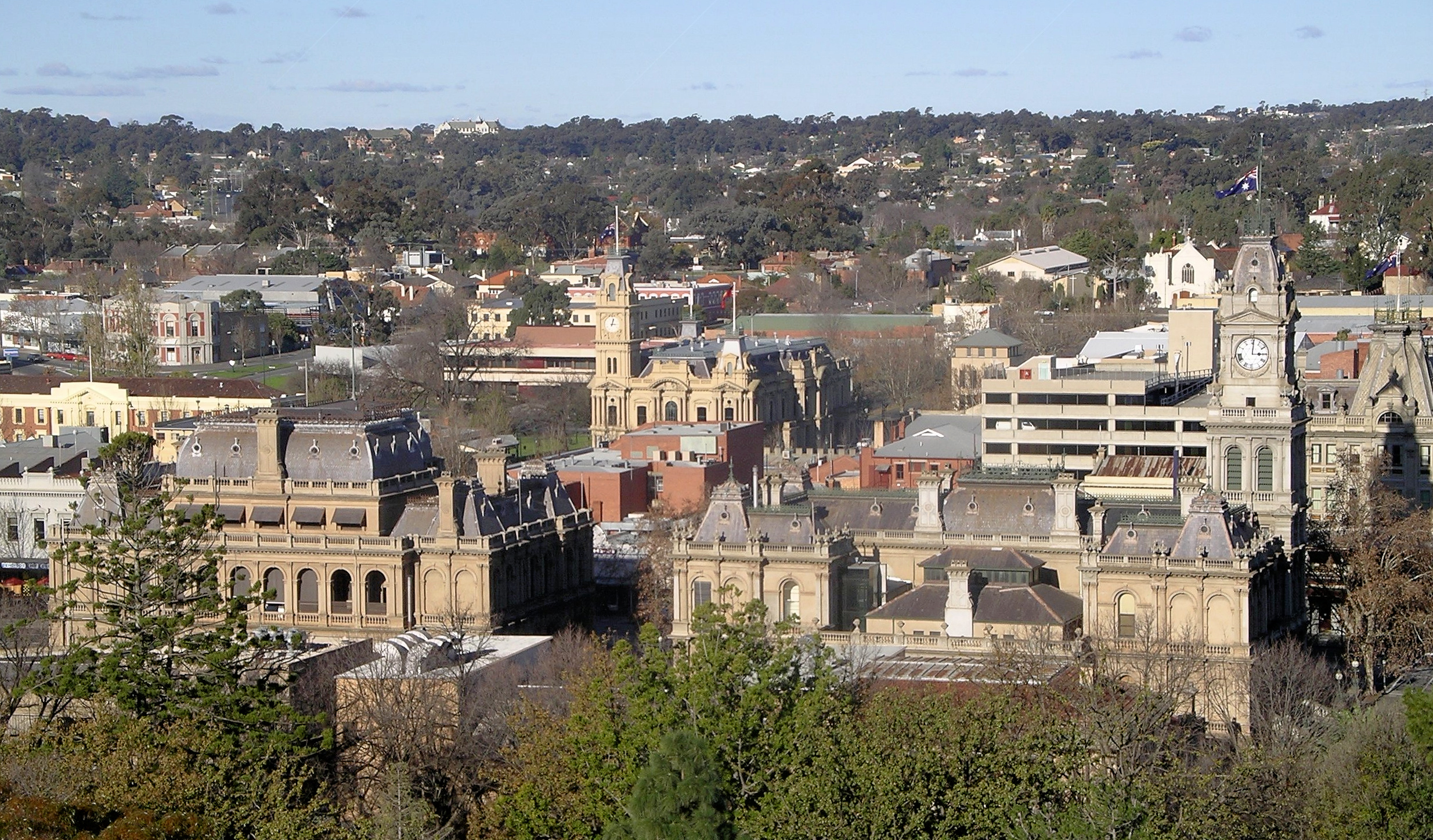
The city of Bendigo, the division's namesake

In the early years of federation the seat consisted of little more than Bendigo itself, but on later boundaries the seat has included towns such as Echuca, Castlemaine, Maryborough and Seymour.

Bendigo has been a marginal seat, changing hands regularly between the Labor Party and the conservative parties; typically mirroring voting patterns in state elections. However, it has remained a Labor seat since the 1998 federal election.

Unlike most marginal seats, Bendigo is not a barometer for winning government. Since 1949, all but one of its members has spent at least one term in opposition. Indeed, during two elections that saw a change of government, it elected an opposition MP.

Its most notable members include its first representative, Sir John Quick, who was a leading federalist, and Prime Minister Billy Hughes who, although from Sydney, represented Bendigo for two terms at a time when the federal Parliament met in Melbourne, and who moved to the seat after leaving the Labor Party over conscription, holding the seat as the leader of the Nationalist Party.

John Brumby, who held the seat from 1983 to 1990, would subsequently be elected to the Victorian Legislative Council in 1993. He then transferred to the Victorian Legislative Assembly seat of Broadmeadows a few months later, after being elected Victorian Opposition Leader, a position he would hold until 1999. After serving as a senior state minister under Steve Bracks, Brumby went on to become Premier of Victoria from 2007 to 2010.

Brumby was defeated in Bendigo at the 1990 election by a former state Legislative Councillor, Bruce Reid, who retained the seat narrowly in 1993 and 1996, before retiring at the 1998 election, when a 4.3% swing delivered the seat to Labor's Steve Gibbons. Reid has a minor claim to fame through being the third candidate in the contest for Liberal leadership between John Hewson and John Howard after the party's 1993 election defeat. Reid attracted one vote, presumably his own.

== Members ==
Image	Member	Party	Term	Notes
	Sir John Quick (1852–1932)	Protectionist	29 March 1901 – 1906	Previously held the Victorian Legislative Assembly seat of Sandhurst. Served as minister under Deakin. Lost seat
	Sir John Quick (1852–1932)	Independent Protectionist	1906 – 26 May 1909	Previously held the Victorian Legislative Assembly seat of Sandhurst. Served as minister under Deakin. Lost seat
	Sir John Quick (1852–1932)	Liberal	26 May 1909 – 23 April 1913	Previously held the Victorian Legislative Assembly seat of Sandhurst. Served as minister under Deakin. Lost seat
	John Arthur (1875–1914)	Labor	31 May 1913 – 9 December 1914	Served as minister under Fisher. Died in office
	Alfred Hampson (1864–1924)	Labor	6 February 1915 – 5 May 1917	Previously held the Victorian Legislative Assembly seat of Bendigo East. Lost seat
	Billy Hughes (1862–1952)	Nationalist	5 May 1917 – 16 December 1922	Previously held the Division of West Sydney. Served as Prime Minister from 1915 to 1923. Transferred to the Division of North Sydney
	Geoffry Hurry (1868–1951)	Nationalist	16 December 1922 – 12 October 1929	Lost seat
	Richard Keane (1881–1946)	Labor	12 October 1929 – 19 December 1931	Lost seat. Later elected to the Senate in 1937
	Eric Harrison (1880–1948)	United Australia	19 December 1931 – 21 September 1937	Did not contest in 1937. Failed to win pre-selection for the Division of Deakin
	George Rankin (1887–1957)	Country	23 October 1937 – 31 October 1949	Transferred to the Senate
	Percy Clarey (1890–1960)	Labor	10 December 1949 – 17 May 1960	Previously a member of the Victorian Legislative Council. Died in office
	Noel Beaton (1925–2004)	Labor	16 July 1960 – 9 April 1969	Resigned to retire from politics
	David Kennedy (1940–)	Labor	7 June 1969 – 2 December 1972	Lost seat. Later elected to the Victorian Legislative Assembly seat of Bendigo. First person from an Indigenous background to be elected to the House of Representatives
	John Bourchier (1929–2017)	Liberal	2 December 1972 – 5 March 1983	Served as Chief Government Whip in the House under Fraser. Lost seat
	John Brumby (1953–)	Labor	5 March 1983 – 24 March 1990	Lost seat. Later elected to the Victorian Legislative Council in 1993
	Bruce Reid (1935–2020)	Liberal	24 March 1990 – 31 August 1998	Previously a member of the Victorian Legislative Council. Retired
	Steve Gibbons (1949–2022)	Labor	3 October 1998 – 5 August 2013	Retired
	Lisa Chesters (1980–)	Labor	7 September 2013 – present	Incumbent

== Election results ==
2025 Australian federal election: Bendigo
Party	Candidate	Votes	%	±%
Labor	Lisa Chesters	35,771	33.55	−8.56
National	Andrew Lethlean	31,707	29.74	+28.84
Greens	Avery Barnett-Dacey	12,079	11.33	−2.42
Liberal	Matt Evans	11,176	10.48	−15.90
One Nation	Heather Freeman	5,262	4.94	−0.61
Legalise Cannabis	Wayne Taylor	3,666	3.44	+3.44
Family First	Evelyn Keetelaar	3,153	2.96	+2.96
Victorian Socialists	Rohan Tyler	1,708	1.60	+1.60
Independent	David Vincent	1,121	1.05	+1.05
Libertarian	Matt Bansemer	974	0.91	−2.02
Total formal votes		106,617	94.48	−1.74
Informal votes		6,228	5.52	+1.74
Turnout		112,845	93.97	+2.52
Two-party-preferred result
Labor	Lisa Chesters	54,800	51.40	−9.81
National	Andrew Lethlean	51,817	48.60	+48.60
Labor hold				
