= Thomas Glass =

Thomas Glass may refer to:

- Thomas Glass (Australian politician) (c. 1864–1911), member of the Victorian Legislative Assembly
- Thomas Glass (physician) (1709–1786), English physician
- Thomas R. Glass (1928–1998), American politician
- Tagwadihi (fl. 1777–1792), Cherokee chief
- Tom Glass (1898–1981), American baseball pitcher
