= Zeke =

- Gender: Male

Other gender
- Masculine: Ezekiel

Zeke is a masculine given name and nickname, and is sometimes a shortened form (hypocorism) of Ezekiel, which may refer to:

== People ==
- Caleb Bailey (1898-1957), US Marine Corps brigadier general and athlete
- Zeke Bella (1930–2013), American baseball player
- Zeke Berry (born 2003), American football player
- Zeke Bonura (1908–1987), American baseball player
- Zeke Bratkowski (1931–2019), American football player
- Zeke Clements (1911–1994), American country musician
- Zeke Dombrowski (born 1986), American soccer player
- Ezekiel Elliott (born 1995), American football running back
- Ezekiel Emanuel (born 1957), American oncologist, bioethicist and professor
- Zeke Jabbour, American professional bridge player
- Zeke Jones (born 1966), American wrestler
- Zeke Manners (1911–2000), American country musician
- Zeke Manyika (born 1955), Zimbabwean-born British musician
- Zeke Meyer (1892–1962), American racecar driver
- Zeke Moore (American football) (born 1943), American football player
- Zeke Moore (basketball) (born 1997), Trinidadian-American basketball player
- Zeke Moreno (born 1978), American football player
- Zeke Mowatt (born 1961), American football player
- Zeke Nnaji (born 2001), American basketball player
- Alden Sanborn (1899–1991), American rower
- Zeke Smith (1936–2016), American football player
- Zeke Steggall (born 1971), Australian snowboarder
- Isiah Thomas (born 1989), American retired Hall-of-Fame basketball player
- Zeke Turner (born 1996), American football player
- Zeke Upshaw (1991–2018), American basketball player
- Zeke Vandenburgh (born 1999), American football player
- Zeke Wilson (1869–1928), American baseball player
- Zeke Wissinger (1902–1963), American football player
- Zeke Wrigley (1874–1952), American baseball player
- Zeke Zarchy (1915–2009), American trumpet player
- Zeke Zawoluk (1930–2007), American basketball player
- Zeke Zekley (1915–2005), American cartoonist
- Zeke Zettner (1948–1973), American musician

== Fictional characters ==
=== In film ===
- a character in the 2002 film Ice Age
- Zeke Baylor, in the High School Musical film series

=== On television ===
- Zeke Kinski, in the Australian soap opera Neighbours

=== Comics, manga, and novels ===
- Zeke Asakura, English name for Hao Asakura, in the anime and manga series Shaman King
- Zeke Brenner, in the comic strip Doonesbury
- Zeke Stane, a Marvel Comics villain
- Zeke Midas Wolf or Big Bad Wolf in Disney comics
