= David Andrew =

Australian politician

Senator for Victoria
- In office 14 November 1925 – 18 November 1928
- Preceded by: Joseph Hannan
- Succeeded by: Richard Abbott

Personal details
- Born: David John Andrew; 10 November 1867 Castlemaine, Victoria, Australia
- Died: 18 November 1928 (aged 62) Bendigo, Victoria, Australia
- Party: Country
- Spouse(s): Myra McIntyre (m. 1888; died 1892) Clara McIntyre (m. 1893; died 1928)
- Occupation: Auctioneer

David John Andrew (10 November 1867 – 18 November 1928) was an Australian politician. He was a Senator for Victoria from 1925 until his death in 1928, representing the Country Party. He was an auctioneer prior to entering politics and also served three terms as mayor of Bendigo.

== Early life ==
Andrew was born on 10 November 1866 in Castlemaine, Victoria. He was the son of Augusta Arabella (née Willis) and James Sprunt Andrew. His father was a stonemason at the time of his birth but later worked as an auctioneer.

Andrew was educated at state schools then served four years of an apprenticeship to a fitter. He left his apprenticeship to join his father's auctioneering business in Bendigo, which he took over in 1908. Andrew was prominent in various community organisations in Bendigo, serving as captain of the local fire brigade and later as president of the Victorian Country Fire Brigades Board. He served as chairman of the local Citizens’ Patriotic Committee during World War I, was a founder and clan chief of the Bendigo Caledonian Society and a councillor of the Victorian Scottish Union, and was an honorary life governor of Bendigo Hospital. He was also active in the River Murray Waters Conservation League.

== Politics ==
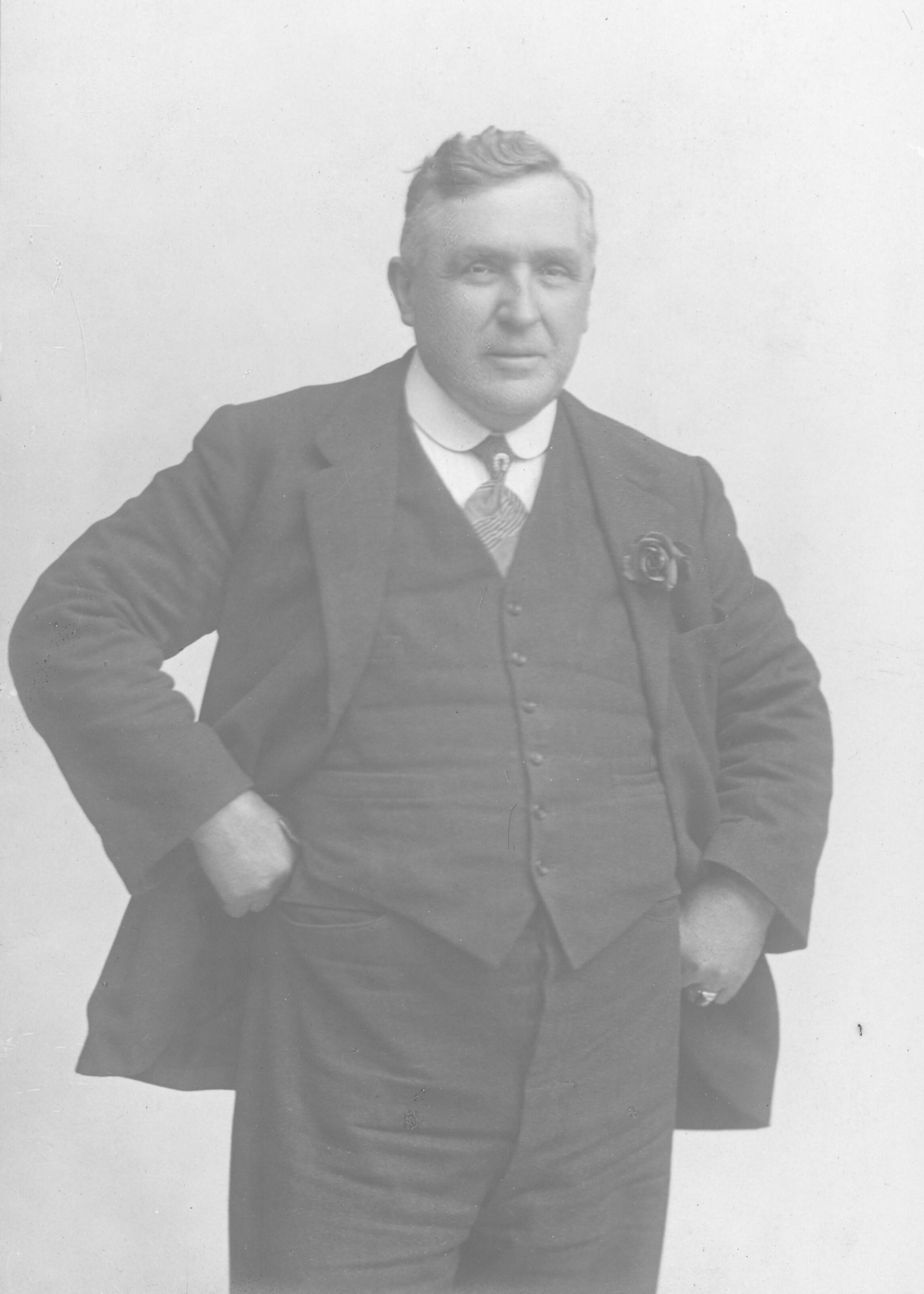
Andrew c. 1925 (photograph by Bartlett Bros.)

Andrew was a long-serving member of the Bendigo City Council and was elected as mayor in 1909, 1913 and 1920. He stood unsuccessfully for the Victorian Legislative Assembly on four occasions, running in Bendigo West at the 1911, 1914 and 1920 state elections and also at the 1915 Bendigo East state by-election.

Andrew was an unsuccessful Country Party candidate for the Senate at the 1922 federal election. He was elected to the Senate at the 1925 election, completing the remainder of the six-year term begun by Australian Labor Party senator Stephen Barker, who had died in office in 1924. In parliament, Andrew supported economic interventionism, including a national insurance scheme, a national housing scheme, increased government spending on health and the elderly, and increased subsidies and protection for primary industry.

Andrew was endorsed by the Country Party for re-election to a full term at the 1928 election, but experienced poor health in the lead-up to the election and withdrew his candidacy in October 1928, only days before the close of nominations. He had experienced multiple heart attacks during the parliamentary term, including one during a parliamentary sitting.

== Personal life ==
In 1888, Andrew married Myra McIntyre. He was widowed in 1892 and the following year married his deceased wife's sister, Clara McIntyre. He had one son from his first marriage and two daughters from his second.

Andrew died on 18 November 1928 at his home in Golden Square, Victoria, a day after the 1928 election. His second wife had died several weeks earlier.
