= Kanam =

Kanam may refer to:

== Places ==
- Kanam, Tamil Nadu, a panchayat town in Thoothukudi, Tamil Nadu, India
- Kanam (Kerala), a village in Kottayam, Kerala, India
- Kanam, Nigeria, a Local Government Area in Plateau State
- Kanam prehistoric site, a site in Kenya

== People ==
- Barbara Kanam (born 1973), Congolese singer
- Kanam E. J. (1926–1987), Malayalam fiction writer and lyricist
- Kanam Rajendran (born 1950), Indian politician

== Films ==
- Kanam, Telugu-language version of the 2018 Indian film Diya (film)
- Kanam, Tamil-language version of the 2022 Indian film Oke Oka Jeevitham

== Other uses ==
- கனம் (kanam), a Tamil honorific meaning weight

== See also ==
- Kaname, a Japanese name
