= Luke Clough =

Australian politician

Luke James Clough (4 July 1878 – 3 December 1956) was an Australian politician.

He was born at Pinegrove near Echuca to farmer Thomas Clough and Mary Howe. He became a market gardener in Bendigo and then a bootmaker. He was a founding member of the Bendigo East branch of the Labor Party and served as branch president; he was also on the state executive from 1911 to 1914. In 1915 he won a by-election for the Victorian Legislative Assembly seat of Bendigo East, and served as a backbench Labor member until 1927, when his seat was abolished and he was defeated for preselection in the new seat of Bendigo. Clough died in Bendigo on 3 December 1956.

Victorian Legislative Assembly
Preceded by Alfred Hampson	Member for Bendigo East; 1915–1927	Abolished
