= Bartholomew Parr =

Bartholomew Parr FRS FRSE
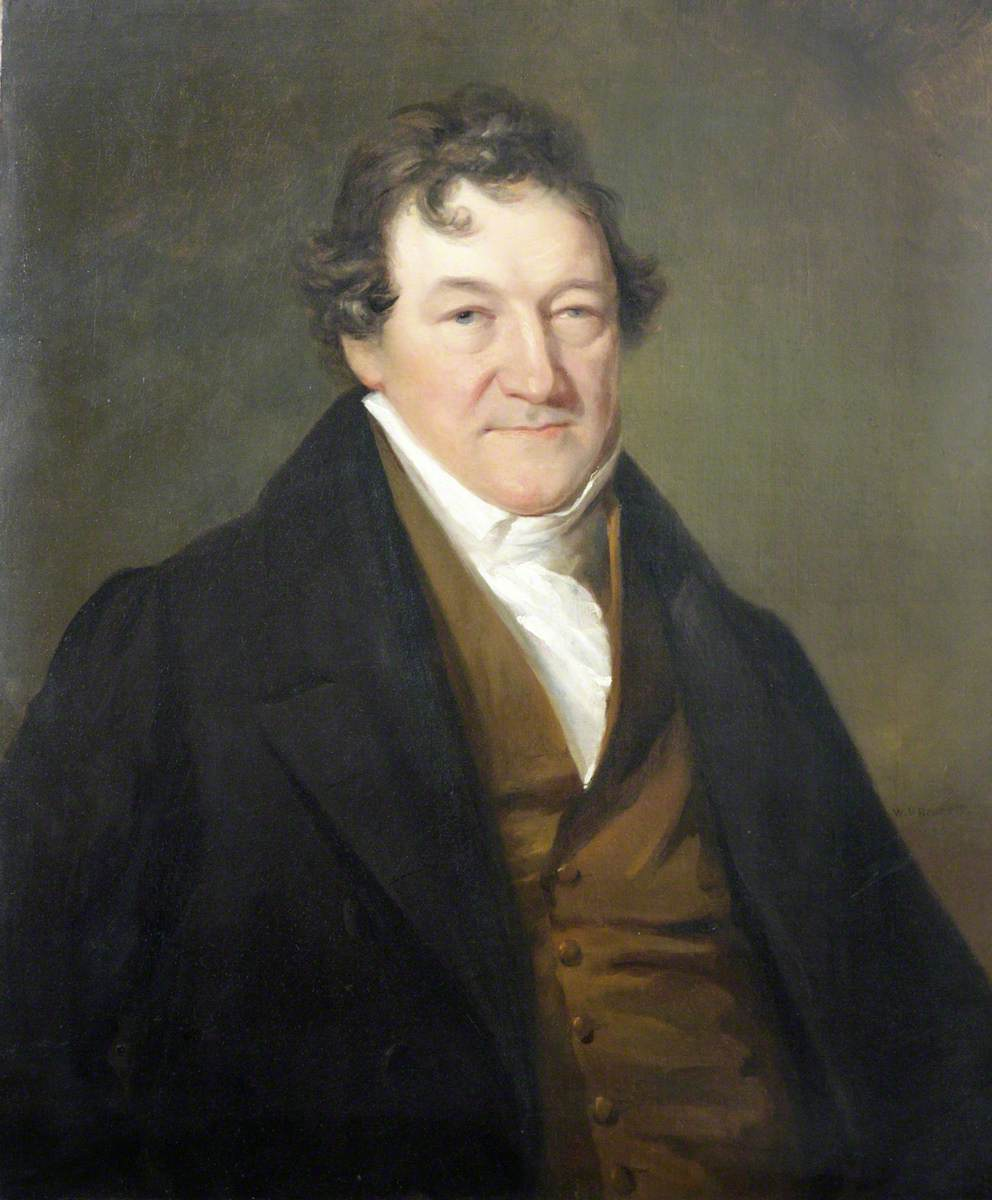

Personal details
- Born: 1750 Exeter, Devon, England
- Died: 20 November 1810 (aged 59–60) Exeter, Devon, England
- Occupation: Physician

Bartholomew Parr (1750 – 20 November 1810) was a British physician and medical author, known for his London Medical Dictionary published in 1809.

After earning his Doctor of Medicine in 1773 at the University of Edinburgh, Parr served as Physician of the Devon and Exeter Hospital in southwest England. He was later elected as Fellow of the Royal Societies of Edinburgh and London.

== Life ==
Parr was born in Exeter in Devon in 1750 the son of Bartholomew Parr (1713-1800), surgeon of Exeter Hospital (and a pupil of Dr. William Smellie), by his second wife Johanna Burgess.

He was sent to the University of Edinburgh to study medicine and graduated with a Doctor of Medicine in 1773, returning to Exeter to practice. In February 1775 he replaced Dr. Thomas Glass as Physician of the Devon and Exeter Hospital.

In 1789 he was elected a Fellow of the Royal Society of Edinburgh. His proposers were Alexander Hamilton, James Hutton and Andrew Duncan, the elder. In 1797 he was also elected a Fellow of the Royal Society of London.

He died at home at Bedford Circus in Exeter on 20 November 1810. He is buried in the churchyard of St Stephen's Church, Exeter. His will of 1811 is held at the National Archive in Kew. Parr Street in Exeter near Belmont Park is named after him.

== Family ==
He married Maria Coddrington who bore him two sons: Coddrington Parr and Samuel Parr. Coddrington acquired Stoneland House in Dawlish in 1822.

On her death he married Frances Robson in May 1809 but she abandoned him after six weeks.

== Publications ==
- Account of the Influenza as it Appeared in Devonshire in May 1792 (1792)
- London Medical Dictionary (1809)

He was editor of both Medical and Philosophical Commentaries and Annals of Medicine.

== Artistic recognition ==
His portrait, by William Mineard Bennett, is held by the Royal Devon and Exeter Hospital.
