= William Mineard Bennett =

English painter

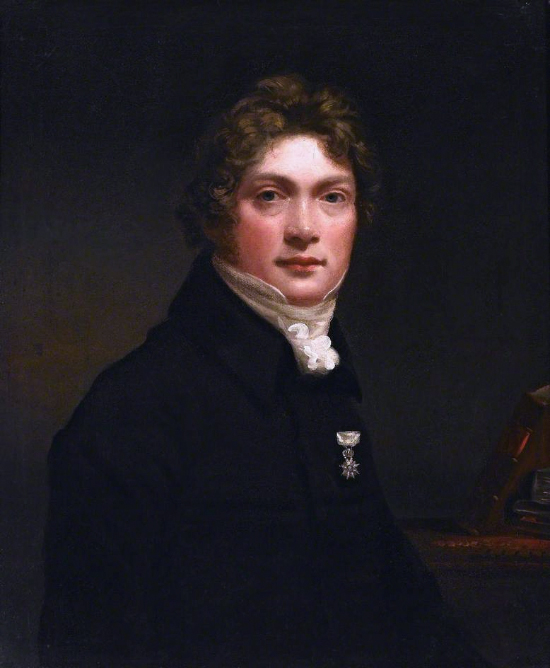
- Self portrait (1815)
- Born: 1778; Exeter
- Died: 17 October 1858; Exeter
- Education: Abraham Ezekiel; Thomas Lawrence; Venanzio Rauzzini
- Known for: painting; vocalist

William Mineard Bennet (1778–1858), was an English miniature-painter, singer and composer.

== Life ==
Bennett was born at Exeter in 1778. While apprenticed to the engraver Abraham Ezekiel in the city, he learned Hebrew and became enthusiastic about music. Following the expiration of his apprenticeship he moved to London and set himself up as miniature painter. He studied under Sir Thomas Lawrence, and gained a considerable reputation as a painter of portraits and miniatures. He mixed with many of the most distinguished literary men of that day, among whom his wit and talents made him a great favourite. In 1806, however, he moved to Bath, to study with the singing teacher Rauzzini. In December of that year he made his first public appearance as a singer at a concert in Bath, at which he performed an air composed by Rauzzini. According to an article in the Monthly Review, "his reception was most flattering; the song was loudly encored, and, in one of Handel's songs, he was equally successful. After this, he continued to sing at the concerts, during the season, and also at the catch club, held at York-house".

The Monthly Review continued:

Mr. Bennett had long determined to make trial of the stage; and, towards the end of the season, made his debut in the character of Prince Orlando, in the comic opera of The Cabinet. His reception here was more flattering than at the concerts, and he made an engagement with the managers to play a few nights; which he did, in the following characters: Don Carlos, in the Duenna; Young Meadows, in Love in a Village; Don Alphonso, in The Castle of Andalusia; Lord William, in the Haunted Tower; Paul, in Paul and Virginia; and Patrick, in The Poor Soldier—in all of which he gave much satisfaction.

Just before the opening of the Hay-market theatre, in the same season, he received an offer to play six nights there, which he accepted; but to get up an opera was deemed impracticable, and he played the six nights in musical after-pieces. His first appearance before a London audience was in the character of Paul, in Paul and Virginia, it being only his seventh appearance on any stage, and his reception was extremely favourable to so young a performer."

He remained in Bath for some time, continuing to work as a miniature painter while studying music, and published a few compositions including a glee called "The Stars of the night arise", a duet for two voices, entitled, "Sweet warbling bird with dulcet note", and a song called "The Victory off Trafalgar".

Several of his works were exhibited at the Royal Academy between 1812 and 1816, and again in 1834 and 1835. He spent some years in Paris, where his talents won him the patronage and friendship of the Duc de Berri; but in 1844 he returned to Exeter, where, painting only as an amusement, he lived until his death, on 17 October 1858.

== Sources ==
- Graves, Robert Edmund (1885). "Bennett, William Mineard" . In Stephen, Leslie (ed.). Dictionary of National Biography. Vol. 4. London: Smith, Elder & Co.
- Gent. Mag. 1868, ii. 647; Redgrave's Dictionary of Artists, 1878.
