= 1915 Bendigo by-election =

← 1914	6 February 1915	1917 →

The Bendigo seat in the House of Representatives
- Registered: 35,495
- Turnout: 24,150 (68.04%)
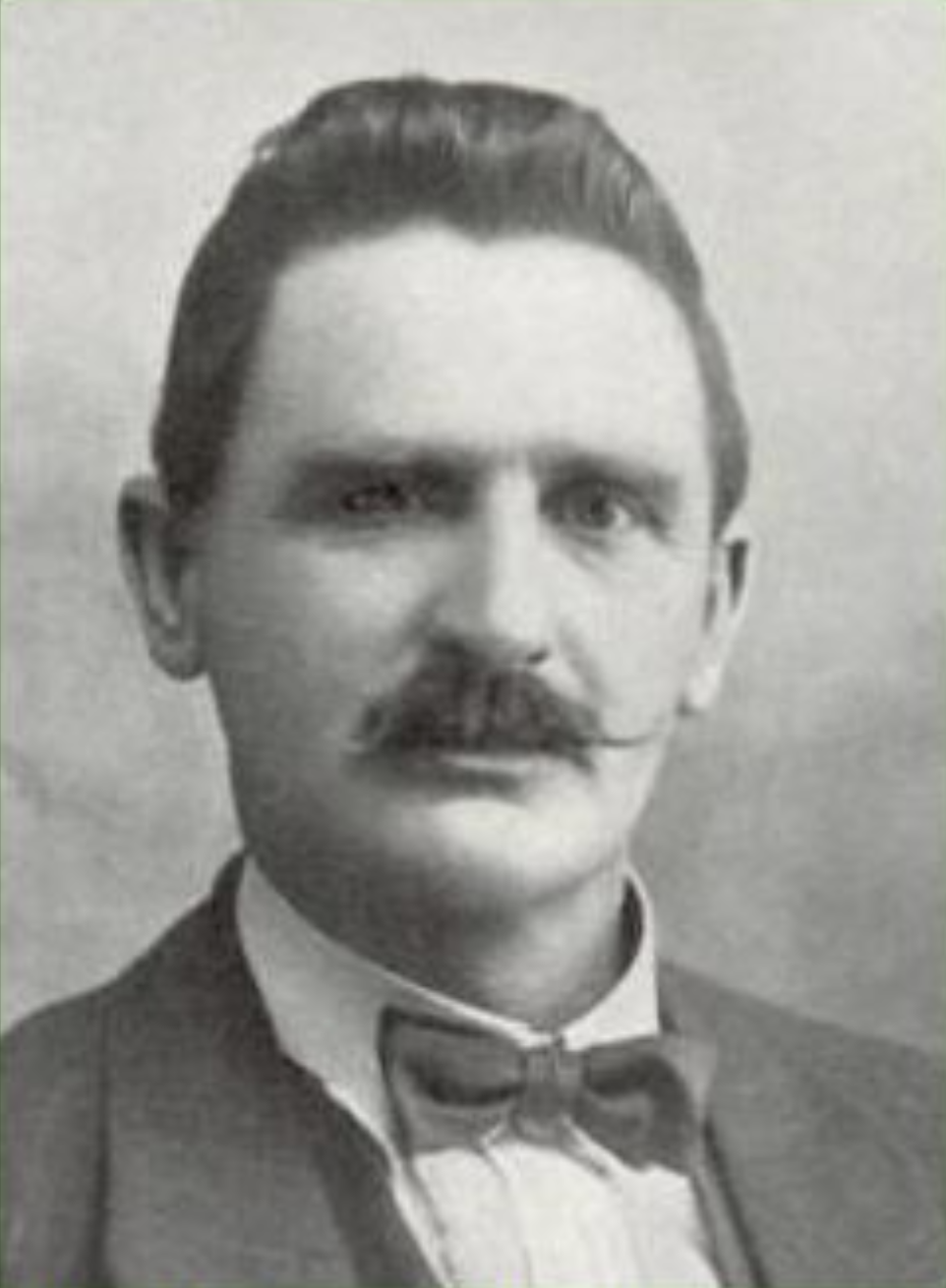
	First party	Second party
		LIB
Candidate	Alfred Hampson	William Richards
Party	Labor	Liberal
Popular vote	12,188	11,761
Percentage	50.89%	49.11%
Swing	▼4.21	▲4.21
MP before election
John Arthur
Labor
Elected MP
Alfred Hampson
Labor

A by-election was held for the Australian House of Representatives seat of Bendigo on 6 February 1915. This was triggered by the death of Labor MP and External Affairs Minister John Arthur.

The by-election was won by Labor candidate Alfred Hampson.

== Results ==
1915 Bendigo by-election
Party	Candidate	Votes	%	±%
Labor	Alfred Hampson	12,188	50.89	−4.21
Liberal	William Richards	11,761	49.11	+4.21
Total formal votes		23,949	99.17	+0.87
Informal votes		201	0.83	−0.87
Registered electors		35,495		
Turnout		24,150	68.04	−4.48
Labor hold		Swing	−4.21	
