= Ezekiel (disambiguation) =

Ezekiel is the Graecised version of the Hebrew name Yehezkel, denoting a prophet of the Hebrew Bible. The form Ezekiel is used in the Christian Old Testament.

Ezekiel may also refer to:

== People ==
- Ezekiel (name), a variant of the Hebrew name Yehezkel, used as both a given name and surname (including a list of people and fictional characters with the name)
- Ezekiel, a ring name of American professional wrestler Elias
- Yehezkel, an alternate spelling of the Hebrew prophet Ezekiel (including a list of people with the name)

== Arts, entertainment, and media ==
=== Fictional characters ===
- King Ezekiel, in The Walking Dead franchise
- Ezekiel Sims, from Marvel Comics
- Ezekiel, from the Total Drama animated series

=== Literature ===
- Book of Ezekiel, a book of the Hebrew and Christian Bibles
- "The Book of Ezekiel" (comics), a 2004 Spider-Man storyline

=== Music ===
- Book of Ezekiel (album), 2007 album of rapper Freekey Zekey
- EZ3kiel, French alternative music band

== See also ==
- Jeheskel Shoshani (1943–2008), Israeli evolutionary botanist
- Sagiv Yehezkel (born 1995), Israeli footballer
