= Yehezkel =

Yehezkel (Hebrew: יחזקאל) is the Hebrew name of the biblical prophet known in Western culture as Ezekiel.

Yehezkel may refer to:

== Given name ==
- Yehezkel Abramsky (1886–1976), Russian-born British Orthodox rabbi
- Yehezkel Braun (1922–2014), Israeli composer
- Yehezkel Chazom (1947–2023), Israeli footballer
- Yehezkel Dror (1928–2026), Israeli political scientist
- Yehezkel Flomin (1935–2019), Likud politician
- Yehezkel Hen (1882–1952), Mapai politician
- Yehezkel Kaufmann (1889–1963), Israeli philosopher
- Yehezkel Lazarov (born 1974), Israeli actor
- Yehezkel Nafshy (born 1977), Israeli poet
- Yehezkel Streichman (1906–1993), Israeli painter
- Yehezkel Zakai (1932–2021), Israeli left-wing politician

== Surname ==
- Avi Yehezkel (born 1958), Israeli Labor Party politician
- Nissan Yehezkel (born 1971), Israeli football manager
- Sagiv Yehezkel (born 1995), Israeli footballer

== See also ==
- Ezekiel (disambiguation)
- Kfar Yehezkel, moshav ovdim in the Jezreel Valley
