= Michael John (politician) =

Australian politician

Michael John (29 April 1943 – 6 June 2003) was a Welsh-born Australian politician.

He was born in Swansea to G. H. and Beryl John, and the family migrated to Australia in 1956. He graduated from Hamilton High School with Honours and was awarded the Myer and Commonwealth Scholarships to the University of Melbourne, where he received a Bachelor of Arts and a Bachelor of Law in 1965. He worked as a barrister and solicitor and is a partner in a law firm in Bendigo. In 1965 he married Belinda, with whom he had three daughters. He was a keen athlete, and competed in the final of the 1969 Stawell Gift.

In 1985 John was elected to the Victorian Legislative Assembly as the Liberal member for Bendigo East. He was made Shadow Cabinet Secretary in December 1985 and moved to the opposition front bench as Shadow Minister for Planning and Environment, Tourism and Aboriginal Affairs in 1988. He left the front bench in 1989 but returned in 1991 as Shadow Minister for Community Services and Aboriginal Affairs, taking the ministry following the Coalition's victory at the 1992 state election. He served as a minister until 1996 and was defeated at the 1999 election.

John died in Bendigo on 6 June 2003.

Victorian Legislative Assembly
| New seat | Member for Bendigo East; 1985–1999 | Succeeded by Jacinta Allan |
