= Alfred Hampson =

Australian politician

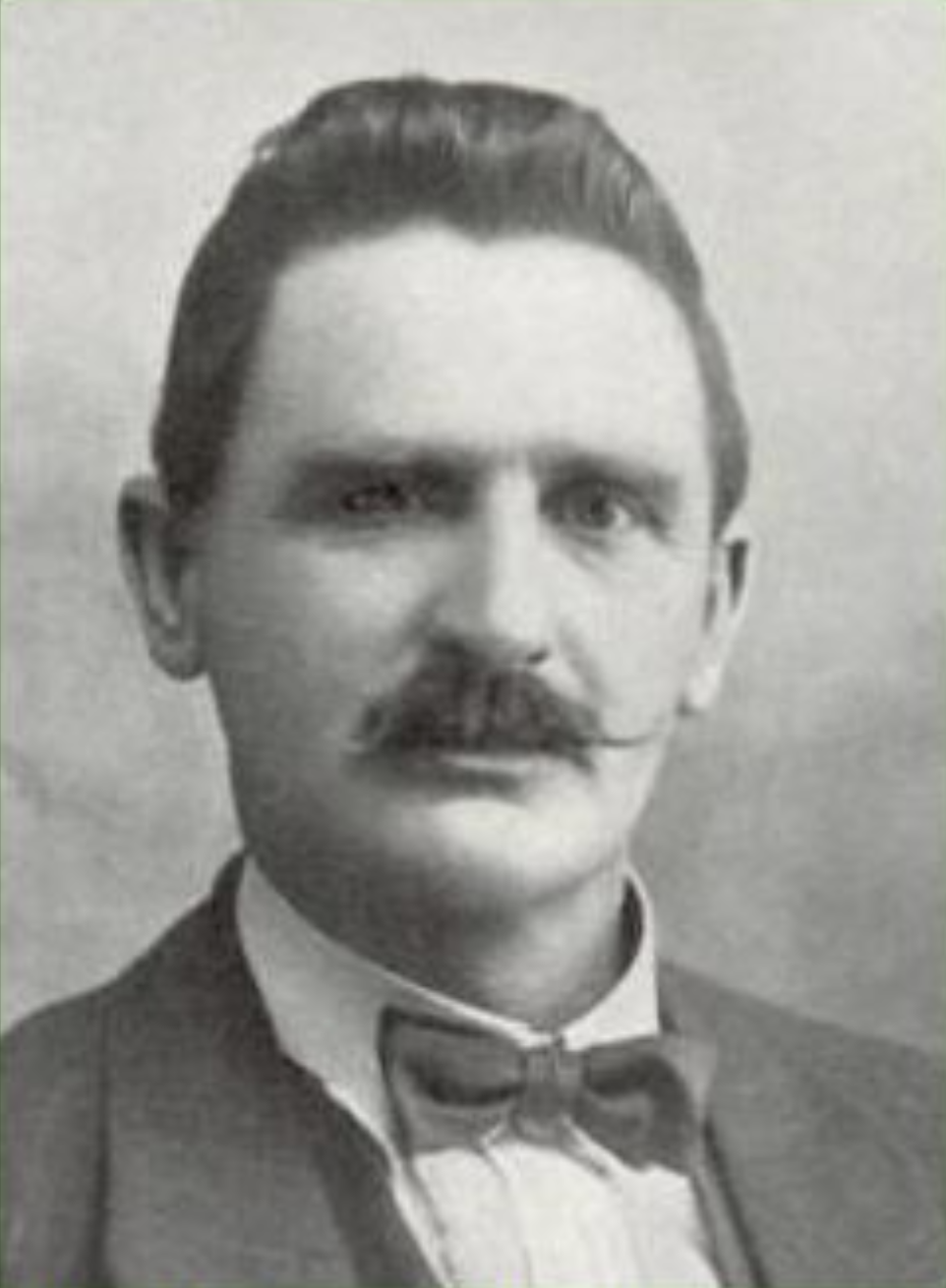

Member of the Australian Parliament for Bendigo
- In office 6 February 1915 – 5 May 1917
- Preceded by: John Arthur
- Succeeded by: Billy Hughes

Personal details
- Born: 15 September 1864 White Hills, Victoria
- Died: 19 May 1924 (aged 59) Nandaly, Victoria
- Party: Australian Labor Party
- Spouse(s): Rundle, Alice Maud
- Occupation: Soap manufacturer

Alfred John Hampson (15 September 1864 – 19 May 1924) was an Australian politician.

Born in White Hills, a suburb of Bendigo, Victoria, Hampson received a primary education before becoming a eucalyptus and soap manufacturer. In 1911, he was elected to the Victorian Legislative Assembly as the Labor member for Bendigo East. He remained in that position until 1915, when he transferred to the Australian House of Representatives, winning a by-election for the seat of Bendigo. He remained in Parliament until 1917, when the Nationalist Prime Minister, Billy Hughes, contested the seat and defeated Hampson.

Hampson remains the only sitting MP to have been challenged and ousted by the sitting prime minister for his seat.

Following his defeat, Hampson enlisted with the AIF on 23 October 1917, giving his date of birth as 15 September 1868, and his wife Alice Maud Caroline Hampson of 76 Addison Street, Elwood (at that time very much a working-class suburb) as his next of kin. He embarked for France in November 1917, serving with the 2nd Railway Company. Returning to Australia in October 1919, he was appointed as an inspector for the Victorian Closer Settlement Board.

Hampson's body was found in his car in Nandaly, Victoria, his death having apparently been caused by a heart attack. He was buried in the Bendigo cemetery.

Victorian Legislative Assembly
Preceded by Thomas Glass	Member for Bendigo East; 1911–1915	Succeeded by Luke Clough
Australian House of Representatives
Preceded by John Arthur	Member for Bendigo; 1915–1917	Succeeded by Billy Hughes
