= Sarah Ezekiel =

Artist who uses assistive technology

Sarah Ezekiel (born 1965) is a British artist. She has ALS (also known as motor neuron disease or MND in the UK) and uses technology to communicate, control a computer cursor and create her images.

Ezekiel studied art and art history and had begun her career as an artist using primarily pastels, watercolours, and acrylics. She was diagnosed with motor neuron disease in 2000. She had a young child and was expecting her second child at the time. She cannot speak or move her arms. She uses EyeGaze from assistive technology company Tobii Dynavox to paint with her eyes.

She is a patron of the charity Lifelites, facilitating fundraising for the organization that brings technological assistance to children in hospice care. She is also the co-chair of the Northwest London chapter of the MND Association.

== Exhibits and public events ==
Ezekiel's art has been shown internationally, including at The Royal Academy Schools and Katara Art Center in Qatar. In 2019, her works were among those exhibited by the MND Association at their 40th anniversary event. In 2016 Ezekiel spoke at a Parliamentary reception supporting hospice medical care. She was also awarded the Third Sector Volunteer of the Year Award at this event.
