= Kaname =

- Language: Japanese

Origin
- Meaning: "pivot", "vital point", "Japanese photinia" or "play the music", "rain"

Other names
- Alternative spelling: 要 かなめ 奏雨

Kaname is a Japanese unisex name, and may refer to the following people:

== People ==
=== With the given name Kaname ===
- Kaname Harada (原田 要; 1916–2016), Japanese flying ace
- Kaname Yokoo (横尾要; born 1972), a Japanese professional golfer
- Kaname Endo (遠藤 要; born 1983), a Japanese actor
- Kaname Ide (井出 かなめ; born 1947), a Japanese speed skater
- Kaname Ikeda (池田 要; born 1946), a Japanese civil servant
- Kaname Tajima (田嶋 要; born 1961), a Japanese politician
- Kaname Takino (滝野要; born 1996), a former Japanese baseball player
- Kaname Yuzuki (柚木かなめ; born 1976), also known as Shiho Kawaragi (河原木 志穂), a Japanese voice actress
- Kaname Yonamine (与那嶺要; 1925-2011), also known as Wally Yonamine, a multi-sport American athlete
- Kaname Yoshizawa (吉澤要人; born 2003), actor and leader of the Japanese dance and vocal group 原因は自分にある。(Genin Wa Jibun ni Aru)

=== With the surname Kaname ===
- Jun Kaname (要 潤; born 1981), a Japanese actor

== Characters ==
=== with the given name Kaname ===
- Kaname Chidori, the female protagonist of Full Metal Panic!
- Kaname Chidori, a character of Koi Kaze
- Kaname Chris, a character in Pretty Rhythm
- Kaname Hagiri, a character of YuYu Hakusho
- Kaname Isaki, a character of Nagi-Asu: A Lull in the Sea
- Kaname Kenjō, a character of Strawberry Panic!
- Kaname Kugatachi, a character of Kenichi: The Mightiest Disciple
- Kaname Kuran, a character in Vampire Knight
- Kaname Kururugi, one of the two main characters in InuYasha: The Secret of the Cursed Mask
- Kaname Moniwa, a character of Haikyu!!
- Kaname Mutō, a character of Rurouni Kenshin's one-shot, Yahiko no Sakabatō
- Kaname Nojima, a character of Shigofumi: Letters from the Departed
- Kaname Ōgi, a character of Code Geass
- Kaname Okiura, a character of Kenkō Zenrakei Suieibu Umishō
- Kaname Sengoku, the protagonist's mentor in Welcome to the Ballroom.
- Kaname Sonō, a character of Gakuen Alice
- Kaname Takishima, a character of Special A
- Kaname Tōjō, a character of Ensemble Stars!! Music
- Kaname Tōsen, a character of Bleach (manga)
- Kaname Date, the protagonist of AI: The Somnium Files
- Kaname Asagiri, a character in Magical Girl Site
- Kaname Tekki, a character in Succubus and Hitman
- Kaname Makiishi, an antagonist in Triage X

=== with the surname Kaname ===
- Kei Kaname, one of the main protagonists from the anime/manga Oblivion Battery
- Madoka Kaname, a main character from the anime/manga Puella Magi Madoka Magica
- Rāna Kaname, a character from the anime series BanG Dream! It's MyGO!!!!!
