= Ezequiel =

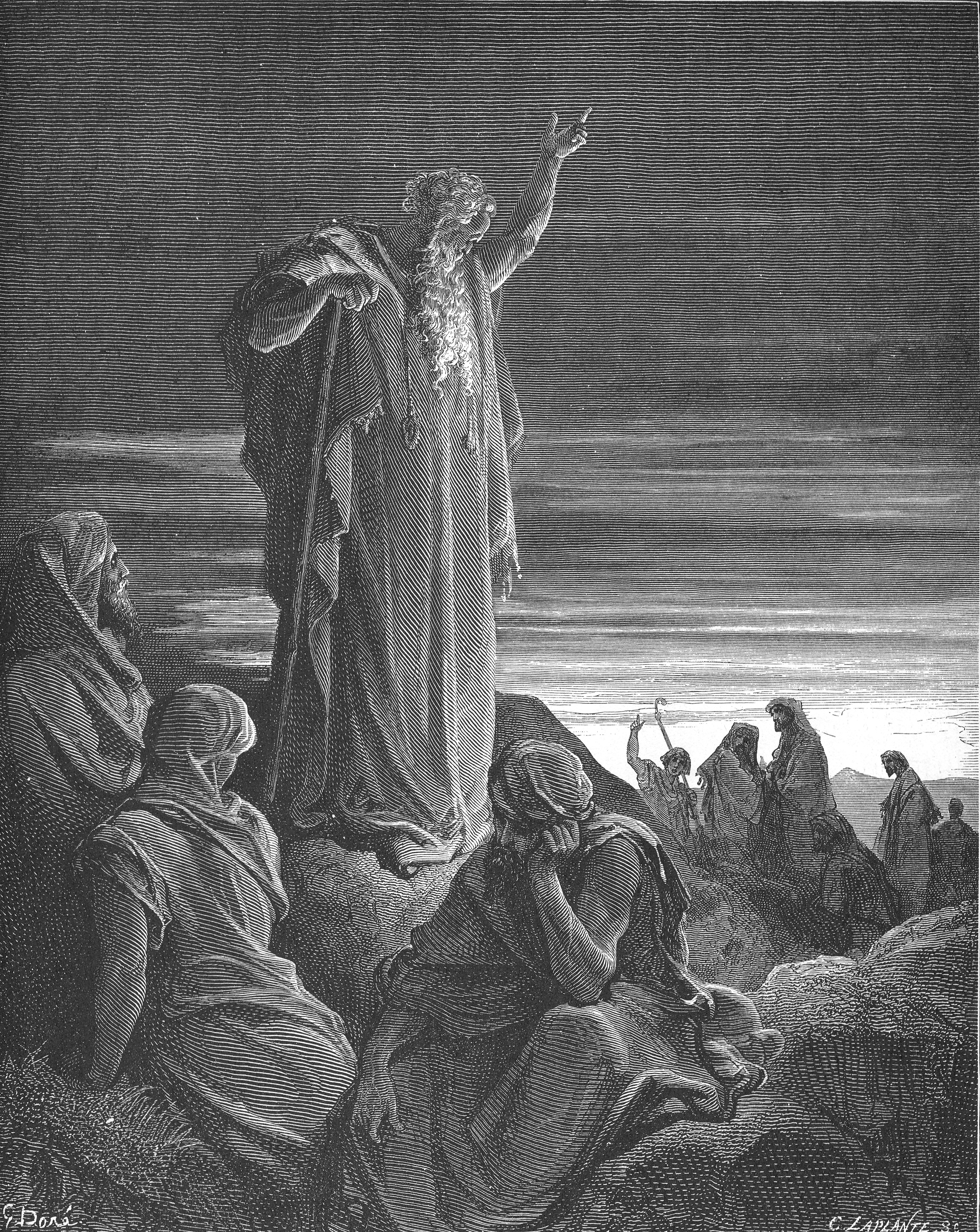
The Prophet Ezekiel

Ezequiel is a given name, the Spanish version of Ezekiel. Notable people with the name include:

== People ==
- Ezequiel Adamovsky (born 1971), Argentine historian and political activist
- Ezequiel Alejo Carboni (born 1979), is an Argentine midfielder
- Ezequiel Andreoli (born 1978), Argentine footballer
- Ezequiel Astacio (born 1979), Major League Baseball pitcher
- Ezequiel Baptista (born 1926), former Portuguese footballer who played as midfielder
- Ezequiel Bitok (born 1966), retired Kenyan runner
- Ezequiel Bosio (born 1985), Argentine racing driver
- Ezequiel Brítez (born 1985), Argentine footballer
- Ezequiel Cabeza De Baca (1864–1917), served briefly as the second Governor of New Mexico before his death in 1917
- Ezequiel Cacace (born 1984), Argentine footballer
- Ezequiel Calvente (born 1991), Spanish footballer
- Ezequiel Carballo (born 1989), Argentine footballer
- Ezequiel Carrasco (born 2002), Canadian soccer player
- Ezequiel Carrera (born 1987), Major League Baseball center fielder
- Ezequiel Castaño (born 1981), Argentine actor
- Ezequiel Castillo (beach volleyball), male beach volleyball player from Dominican Republic
- Ezequiel Castillo (footballer) (born 1967), retired Argentine footballer who played as a midfielder
- Ezequiel Cirigliano (born 1992), Argentine football midfielder
- Ezequiel Fernández (Panamanian politician) (1886–1946), Second Vice President of Panama from 1936 to 1939
- Ezequiel Filipetto (born 1987), Argentine football defender
- Ezequiel Garay (born 1986), Argentine footballer
- Ezequiel González (born 1980), Argentine football
- Ezequiel Guillermo Jesus Amaya (born 1978), Argentine footballer
- Ezequiel Gutiérrez Iglesias (1840–1920), Costa Rican politician
- Ezequiel Hurtado, politician, military general and statesman who became President of Colombia
- Ezequiel Lázaro (born 1981), Argentine footballer
- Ezequiel Lavezzi (born 1985), Argentine football striker
- Ezequiel Lazo (born 1989), Argentine footballer
- Ezequiel Luna (born 1986), Argentine footballer
- Ezequiel Maderna (born 1986), boxer in the Light Heavyweight division
- Ezequiel Maggiolo (born 1977), Argentine football striker
- Ezequiel Martínez Estrada (1895–1964), Argentine writer, poet, essayist, and literary critic
- Ezequiel Medrán (born 1980), Argentine football goalkeeper
- Ezequiel Miralles (born 1983), Argentine footballer who plays as a striker
- Ezequiel Montalt (born 1977), Spanish actor
- Ezequiel Moreno y Díaz, member of the Order of Augustinian Recollects, now venerated as a Saint in the Roman Catholic Church
- Ezequiel Mosquera (born 1975), Spanish professional road bicycle racer for UCI ProTeam Vacansoleil-DCM
- Ezequiel Muñoz (born 1990), Argentine footballer who plays as a centre back
- Ezequiel Orozco (born 1988), Mexican professional football forward
- Ezequiel Padilla Peñaloza (1890–1971), Mexican statesman
- Ezequiel Paulón (born 1976), field hockey defender from Argentina
- Ezequiel Rescaldani (born 1992), Argentine football centre forward
- Ezequiel Santiago (1973–2019), American politician
- Ezequiel Scarione (born 1985), Argentine football midfielder
- Ezequiel Schelotto (born 1989), Argentine-born Italian footballer
- Ezequiel Skverer (born 1989), Israeli-Argentine basketball player
- Ezequiel Uricoechea (1834–1880), Colombian linguist and scientist
- Ezequiel Viñao (born 1960), Argentine-American composer
- Ezequiel Videla (born 1987), Argentine footballer
- Ezequiel Zamora (1817–1860), Venezuelan soldier and leader of the Federalists in the Federal War (Guerra Federal) of 1859–1863
- Lisandro Ezequiel López (born 1989), Argentine football defender
- Manuel Ezequiel Bruzual (1832–1868), military leader committed to liberal ideas, designated provisional President of Venezuela in 1868
- Maximiliano Ezequiel dos Santos or simply Max Santos (born 1987), Brazilian football Forward
- Nicolas Ezequiel Gorosito (born 1988), Argentine football defender

== Places ==
- Coronel Ezequiel, municipality in the state of Rio Grande do Norte in the Northeast region of Brazil
- Ezequiel Montes, Querétaro, municipality in the Mexican state of Querétaro
- Ezequiel Montes Municipality, municipality in Querétaro in central Mexico
- Ezequiel Zamora Municipality, Barinas, one of the 12 municipalities (municipios) that makes up the Venezuelan state of Barinas
- Manuel Ezequiel Bruzual Municipality, one of the 21 municipalities (municipios) that makes up the eastern Venezuelan state of Anzoátegui

== Art, entertainment, and media ==
- Ezequiel, the fictitious head of the Process in 3%
