= John Arthur (Australian politician) =

Australian lawyer and politician (1875–1914)

The Honourable John Arthur
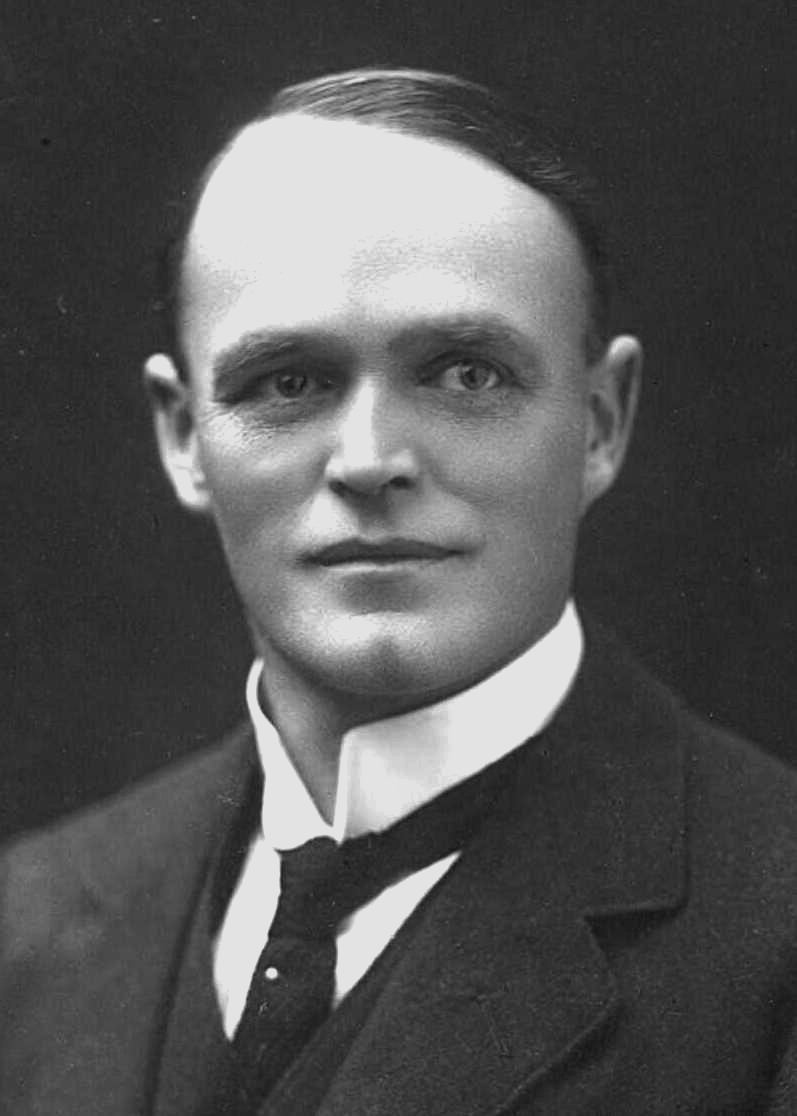

Minister for External Affairs
- In office 17 September 1914 – 9 December 1914
- Prime Minister: Andrew Fisher
- Preceded by: Paddy Glynn
- Succeeded by: Hugh Mahon

Member of the Australian Parliament for Bendigo
- In office 31 May 1913 – 9 December 1914
- Preceded by: John Quick
- Succeeded by: Alfred Hampson

Personal details
- Born: 15 August 1875 Castlemaine, Victoria, Australia
- Died: 9 December 1914 (aged 39) Parkville, Victoria, Australia
- Party: Labor
- Education: University of Melbourne
- Occupation: Barrister

John Andrew Arthur (15 August 1875 – 9 December 1914) was an Australian lawyer and politician. He was a member of the Australian Labor Party (ALP) and was first elected to federal parliament at the 1913 federal election, after a successful career at the Victorian Bar. After the 1914 election, he was appointed Minister for External Affairs in the Fisher government. He died of kidney disease three months later, aged 39.

== Early life ==
Arthur was born in Castlemaine, Victoria, son of a goldminer and spent his childhood in several Victorian goldmining towns. He won a state scholarship allowing him to attend Grenville College, Ballarat for three years. He graduated from the University of Melbourne with a Bachelor of Arts in 1895. He was a brilliant student and completed a Master of Arts in 1897, a Bachelor of Laws in 1898 and a Master of Laws in 1901. He became a tutor at Queen's College in logic and philosophy, political economy and history, and law and was admitted to the bar in 1903.

== Law career ==
Arthur became a prominent lawyer in the new federal courts, especially the Commonwealth Court of Conciliation and Arbitration, and represented the Agricultural Implement Makers' Union in the Harvester case which led to the basic wage concept that was the basis of wage setting in Australia until the 1990s.

== Political career ==
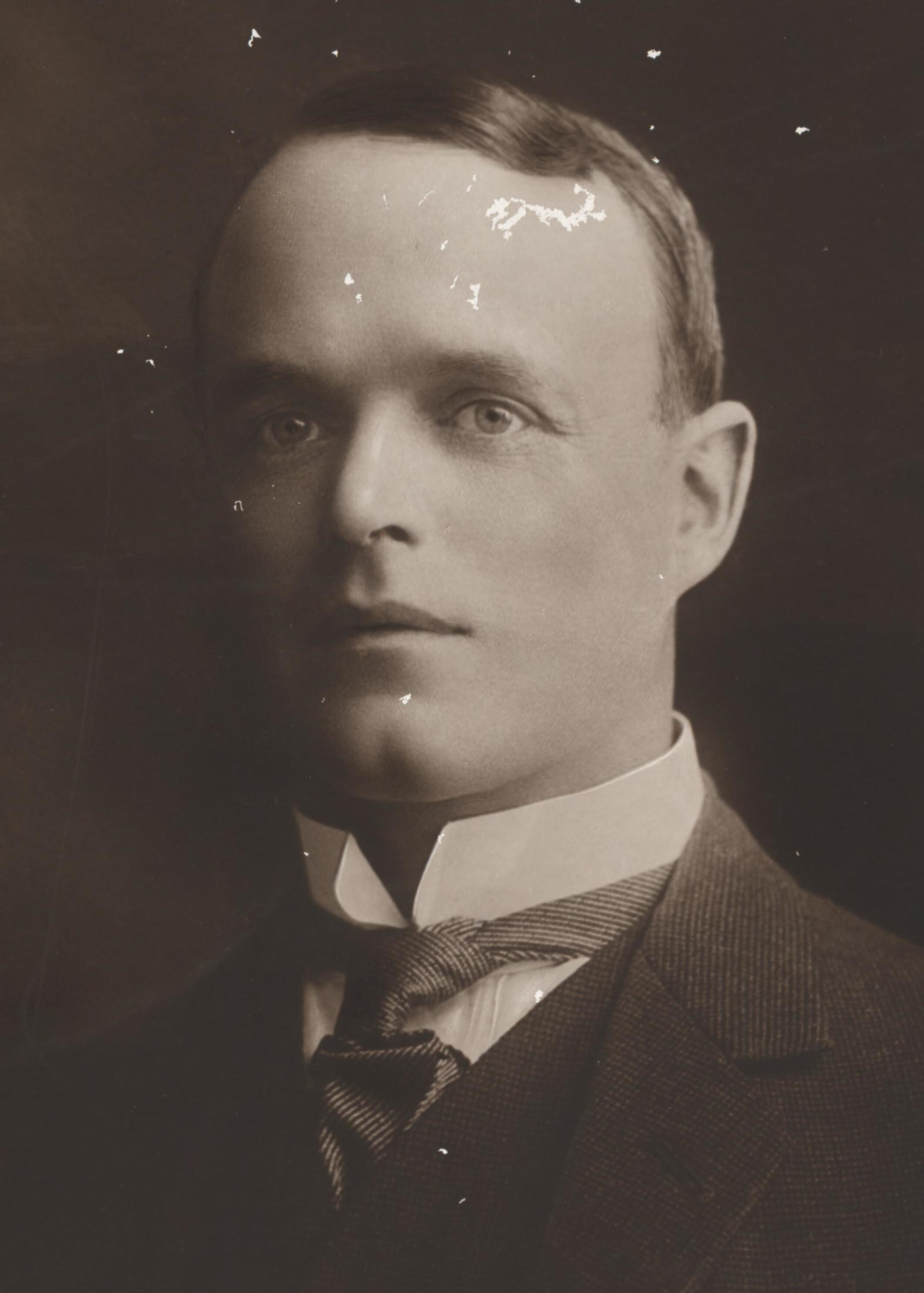
Studio portrait by Humphrey & Co.

In 1913 election he defeated the incumbent John Quick to win the Australian House of Representatives seat of Bendigo for the Australian Labor Party. He was noted for his contribution to parliamentary debates and continued his career as an industrial advocate, often travelling from the then seat of the parliament in Melbourne to Sydney to argue cases. Campaigning for the 1914 election, combined with his court work undermined his health and following the election of the Fisher government he was confined to bed. He attended caucus on 17 September and was elected to the ministry and sworn in as Minister for External Affairs on the same day. He was forced back to bed and died on 9 December 1914 of kidney disease at his home in the Melbourne suburb of Parkville. He was survived by his wife, two daughters and two sons.

Arthur was granted a state funeral, which was held at Queen's Hall in Parliament House, Melbourne. It was attended by Governor-General Ronald Munro-Ferguson, Prime Minister Andrew Fisher, and Opposition Leader Joseph Cook. Fisher, Billy Hughes, George Pearce, John Forrest, William Watt, William Archibald, Littleton Groom, Paddy Glynn, and Thomas Givens served as pallbearers. He was buried in the Methodist section of Coburg Cemetery.

== Notes ==
Political offices
Preceded by Paddy Glynn	Minister for External Affairs; 1914	Succeeded by Hugh Mahon
Parliament of Australia
Preceded by John Quick	Member for Bendigo; 1913–1914	Succeeded by Alfred Hampson
