= Ezekiel Afon =

Nigerian politician

State Representative
- Constituency: Pengana

Personal details
- Died: March 10, 2019
- Party: All Progressive Congress (APC)
- Occupation: Politician

Ezekiel Afon was a Nigerian politician and lawmaker. He represented Pengana Constituency in the Plateau State House of Assembly. He was first elected into the Assembly under the platform of Peoples Democratic Party in 2015, but defected to All Progressive Congress in 2017. He died on March 10, 2019, just hours after being re-elected to represent the constituency.
