= Ezekiel Abraham Ezekiel =

English engraver

Ezekiel Abraham Ezekiel (1757–1806) was an English engraver.

Ezekiel was born at Exeter in 1757. He engraved portraits by Opie, Sir Joshua Reynolds, and others, and was also well known as a miniature painter and a scientific optician.

He died in 1806. A miniature portrait of him was exhibited at the Anglo-Jewish Historical Exhibition held in London in 1887.
