= Electoral results for the Division of Capricornia =

Australian division election results

This is a list of electoral results for the Division of Capricornia in Australian federal elections from the division's creation in 1901 until the present.

== Members ==
Member	Party	Term
Alexander Paterson	Ind. Free Trade	1901–1903
David Thomson	Labour	1903–1906
Edward Archer	Anti-Socialist	1906–1909
Edward Archer	Liberal	1909–1910
William Higgs	Labor	1910–1920
William Higgs	Independent	1920
William Higgs	Nationalist	1920–1922
Frank Forde	Labor	1922–1946
Charles Davidson	Liberal	1946–1949
George Pearce	Liberal	1949–1961
George Gray	Labor	1961–1967
Doug Everingham	Labor	1967–1975
Colin Carige	National	1975–1977
Doug Everingham	Labor	1977–1984
Keith Wright	Labor	1984–1993
Keith Wright	Independent	1993
Marjorie Henzell	Labor	1993–1996
Paul Marek	National	1996–1998
Kirsten Livermore	Labor	1998–2013
Michelle Landry	Liberal National	2013–present

== Election results ==
=== Elections in the 2020s ===
==== 2025 ====
2025 Australian federal election: Capricornia
Party	Candidate	Votes	%	±%
Liberal National	Michelle Landry	36,074	36.56	−2.88
Labor	Emily Mawson	31,483	31.91	+3.86
One Nation	Cheryl Kempton	15,355	15.56	+0.96
Greens	Mick Jones	6,101	6.18	+0.31
Trumpet of Patriots	Stephen Andrew	5,999	6.08	+6.08
Family First	Kerri Hislop	3,646	3.70	+3.70
Total formal votes		98,658	96.53	+2.67
Informal votes		3,547	3.47	−2.67
Turnout		102,205	88.77	+0.17
Two-party-preferred result
Liberal National	Michelle Landry	55,085	55.83	−0.76
Labor	Emily Mawson	43,573	44.17	+0.76
Liberal National hold		Swing	−0.76	

==== 2022 ====
2022 Australian federal election: Capricornia
Party	Candidate	Votes	%	±%
Liberal National	Michelle Landry	35,613	39.44	−1.21
Labor	Russell Robertson	25,330	28.05	+4.31
One Nation	Kylee Stanton	13,179	14.60	−2.38
Greens	Mick Jones	5,302	5.87	+1.03
United Australia	Nathan Harding	3,555	3.94	+0.29
Independent	Ken Murray	3,048	3.38	+0.89
Great Australian	Zteven Whitty	1,747	1.93	+1.93
Liberal Democrats	Steve Murphy	1,392	1.54	+1.54
Informed Medical Options	Paula Ganfield	1,126	1.25	+1.25
Total formal votes		90,292	93.86	+0.19
Informal votes		5,904	6.14	−0.19
Turnout		96,196	88.60	−3.98
Two-party-preferred result
Liberal National	Michelle Landry	51,096	56.59	−5.76
Labor	Russell Robertson	39,196	43.41	+5.76
Liberal National hold		Swing	−5.76	

Alluvial diagram for preference flows in the seat of Capricornia in the 2022 federal election. indicates at what stage the winning candidate had over 50% of the votes and was declared the winner.

=== Elections in the 2010s ===
==== 2019 ====
2019 Australian federal election: Capricornia
Party	Candidate	Votes	%	±%
Liberal National	Michelle Landry	36,163	40.65	+0.59
Labor	Russell Robertson	21,120	23.74	−14.33
One Nation	Wade Rothery	15,105	16.98	+16.98
Greens	Paul Bambrick	4,307	4.84	+0.12
Katter's Australian	George Birkbeck	3,269	3.67	−3.40
United Australia	Lindsay Sturgeon	3,250	3.65	+3.65
Independent	Ken Murray	2,211	2.49	−2.35
Conservative National	Grant Pratt	1,905	2.14	+2.14
Democratic Labour	Richard Temple	1,637	1.84	+1.84
Total formal votes		88,967	93.67	−2.76
Informal votes		6,008	6.33	+2.76
Turnout		94,975	92.58	−0.47
Two-party-preferred result
Liberal National	Michelle Landry	55,475	62.35	+11.72
Labor	Russell Robertson	33,492	37.65	−11.72
Liberal National hold		Swing	+11.72	

==== 2016 ====
2016 Australian federal election: Capricornia
Party	Candidate	Votes	%	±%
Liberal National	Michelle Landry	35,310	40.05	+0.47
Labor	Leisa Neaton	33,579	38.09	+1.05
Katter's Australian	Laurel Carter	6,241	7.08	+1.54
Family First	Lindsay Temple	4,547	5.16	+1.30
Independent	Ken Murray	4,312	4.89	+4.89
Greens	Kate Giamarelos	4,166	4.73	+1.30
Total formal votes		88,155	96.45	+1.60
Informal votes		3,242	3.55	−1.60
Turnout		91,397	93.08	−1.75
Two-party-preferred result
Liberal National	Michelle Landry	44,633	50.63	−0.14
Labor	Leisa Neaton	43,522	49.37	+0.14
Liberal National hold		Swing	−0.14	

==== 2013 ====
2013 Australian federal election: Capricornia
Party	Candidate	Votes	%	±%
Liberal National	Michelle Landry	33,608	39.58	−0.84
Labor	Peter Freeleagus	31,450	37.04	−8.73
Palmer United	Derek Ison	6,747	7.95	+7.95
Katter's Australian	Robbie Williams	4,708	5.54	+5.54
Family First	Hazel Alley	3,274	3.86	+0.37
Greens	Paul Bambrick	2,910	3.43	−2.09
	Bruce Diamond	1,777	2.09	+2.09
Rise Up Australia	Paul Lewis	439	0.52	+0.52
Total formal votes		84,913	94.85	+1.00
Informal votes		4,614	5.15	−1.00
Turnout		89,527	94.83	+1.70
Two-party-preferred result
Liberal National	Michelle Landry	43,109	50.77	+4.45
Labor	Peter Freeleagus	41,804	49.23	−4.45
Liberal National gain from Labor		Swing	+4.45	

==== 2010 ====
2010 Australian federal election: Capricornia
Party	Candidate	Votes	%	±%
Labor	Kirsten Livermore	36,793	45.77	−9.57
Liberal National	Michelle Landry	32,489	40.42	+3.44
Greens	Paul Bambrick	4,435	5.52	+2.52
Family First	Sandra Corneloup	2,802	3.49	+1.70
Independent	Shane Guley	2,045	2.54	+2.54
Independent	Bevan Mowen	1,402	1.74	+1.74
Secular	Steve Jeffery	414	0.52	+0.52
Total formal votes		80,380	93.85	−2.83
Informal votes		5,263	6.15	+2.83
Turnout		85,643	93.13	−2.27
Two-party-preferred result
Labor	Kirsten Livermore	43,150	53.68	−8.40
Liberal National	Michelle Landry	37,230	46.32	+8.40
Labor hold		Swing	−8.40	

=== Elections in the 2000s ===
==== 2007 ====
2007 Australian federal election: Capricornia
Party	Candidate	Votes	%	±%
Labor	Kirsten Livermore	47,508	55.84	+9.89
National	Robert Mills	15,664	18.41	−10.99
Liberal	Scott Kilpatrick	15,416	18.12	+6.96
Greens	Paul Bambrick	2,481	2.92	+0.67
Independent	Bob Oakes	1,859	2.19	+2.19
Family First	Jon Eaton	1,508	1.77	−2.13
Democrats	Anton Prange	422	0.50	−0.87
Citizens Electoral Council	Bill Ingrey	222	0.26	−0.52
Total formal votes		85,080	96.64	+1.16
Informal votes		2,960	3.36	−1.16
Turnout		88,040	94.97	−0.79
Two-party-preferred result
Labor	Kirsten Livermore	53,355	62.71	+8.70
National	Robert Mills	31,725	37.29	−8.70
Labor hold		Swing	+8.70	

==== 2004 ====
2004 Australian federal election: Capricornia
Party	Candidate	Votes	%	±%
Labor	Kirsten Livermore	38,984	47.21	+0.07
National	John Lever	22,719	27.51	+3.14
Liberal	Di Kuntschik	10,938	13.25	−1.27
Family First	Alan J Spackman	3,424	4.15	+4.15
One Nation	Larry H Coleman	2,575	3.12	−4.81
Greens	Michael Kane	1,690	2.05	+0.54
Democrats	Naomi Johns	1,185	1.44	−0.47
HEMP	Judy Canales	787	0.95	+0.95
Citizens Electoral Council	Bill Ingrey	273	0.33	−0.52
Total formal votes		82,575	95.75	−0.10
Informal votes		3,664	4.25	+0.10
Turnout		86,239	94.74	−1.79
Two-party-preferred result
Labor	Kirsten Livermore	45,531	55.14	−0.38
National	John Lever	37,044	44.86	+0.38
Labor hold		Swing	−0.38	

==== 2001 ====
2001 Australian federal election: Capricornia
Party	Candidate	Votes	%	±%
Labor	Kirsten Livermore	36,580	48.95	+1.85
National	John Lever	15,889	21.26	−11.09
Liberal	Lea Taylor	13,159	17.61	+17.61
One Nation	Herb Clarke	5,364	7.18	−6.72
Democrats	Naomi Johns	1,334	1.79	−1.23
Greens	Bob Muir	1,068	1.43	−0.35
Independent	Peter Schuback	512	0.69	−0.80
Citizens Electoral Council	Ray Gillham	476	0.64	+0.27
Independent	John Murphy	343	0.46	+0.46
Total formal votes		74,725	96.05	−1.35
Informal votes		3,070	3.95	+1.35
Turnout		77,795	96.14	
Two-party-preferred result
Labor	Kirsten Livermore	42,492	56.86	+1.57
National	John Lever	32,233	43.14	−1.57
Labor hold		Swing	+1.57	

=== Elections in the 1990s ===
==== 1998 ====
1998 Australian federal election: Capricornia
Party	Candidate	Votes	%	±%
Labor	Kirsten Livermore	35,229	47.11	+6.83
National	Paul Marek	24,197	32.35	+3.69
One Nation	Len Timms	10,393	13.90	+13.90
Democrats	Fay Lawrence	2,255	3.02	−2.27
Greens	Joan Furness	1,334	1.78	−0.70
Independent	Peter Schuback	1,107	1.48	+1.48
Citizens Electoral Council	Andrew Purvis	271	0.36	+0.36
Total formal votes		74,786	97.41	−0.42
Informal votes		1,990	2.59	+0.42
Turnout		76,776	95.25	−0.17
Two-party-preferred result
Labor	Kirsten Livermore	41,352	55.29	+8.75
National	Paul Marek	33,434	44.71	−8.75
Labor gain from National		Swing	+8.75	

==== 1996 ====
1996 Australian federal election: Capricornia
Party	Candidate	Votes	%	±%
Labor	Marjorie Henzell	31,531	40.37	−0.45
National	Paul Marek	21,823	27.94	+5.89
Liberal	Mike Wilkinson	18,321	23.46	+6.75
Democrats	Fay Lawrence	4,071	5.21	+3.02
Greens	Bob Muir	1,980	2.54	+0.89
Indigenous Peoples	Bevan Tull	371	0.48	+0.16
Total formal votes		78,097	97.83	+0.42
Informal votes		1,733	2.17	−0.42
Turnout		79,830	95.42	−0.65
Two-party-preferred result
National	Paul Marek	41,801	53.62	+6.40
Labor	Marjorie Henzell	36,153	46.38	−6.40
National gain from Labor		Swing	+6.40	

==== 1993 ====
1993 Australian federal election: Capricornia
Party	Candidate	Votes	%	±%
Labor	Marjorie Henzell	30,766	40.86	−9.71
National	Margaret Goody	16,243	21.57	−14.66
Liberal	Chris Alroe	12,807	17.01	+15.57
Independent	Jim Rundle	5,308	7.05	+7.05
Independent	Keith Wright	4,472	5.94	+5.94
Confederate Action	Mavis Hinton	1,835	2.44	+2.44
Democrats	Fay Lawrence	1,673	2.22	+1.05
Greens	Bob Muir	1,259	1.67	−8.91
	David Bridgeman	363	0.48	+0.48
	Cameron Smyth	322	0.43	+0.43
Indigenous Peoples	Bevan Tull	240	0.32	+0.32
Total formal votes		75,288	97.41	−0.48
Informal votes		1,998	2.59	+0.48
Turnout		77,286	96.07	
Two-party-preferred result
Labor	Marjorie Henzell	39,663	52.73	−4.68
National	Margaret Goody	35,554	47.27	+4.68
Labor hold		Swing	−4.68	

==== 1990 ====
1990 Australian federal election: Capricornia
Party	Candidate	Votes	%	±%
Labor	Keith Wright	33,200	50.5	−3.5
National	Stan Collard	24,627	37.5	+3.9
Greens	Craig Hardy	7,885	12.0	+12.0
Total formal votes		65,712	97.9	
Informal votes		1,413	2.1	
Turnout		67,125	95.7	
Two-party-preferred result
Labor	Keith Wright	37,551	57.3	+0.3
National	Stan Collard	27,926	42.7	−0.3
Labor hold		Swing	+0.3	

=== Elections in the 1980s ===
==== 1987 ====
1987 Australian federal election: Capricornia
Party	Candidate	Votes	%	±%
Labor	Keith Wright	34,147	54.0	+3.1
National	Ted Price	21,272	33.6	−3.0
Liberal	Tom Young	6,084	9.6	+0.5
Nuclear Disarmament	J. S. Page	1,718	2.7	+2.7
Total formal votes		63,221	97.3	
Informal votes		1,752	2.7	
Turnout		64,973	93.6	
Two-party-preferred result
Labor	Keith Wright	36,065	57.0	+2.9
National	Ted Price	27,155	43.0	−2.9
Labor hold		Swing	+2.9	

==== 1984 ====
1984 Australian federal election: Capricornia
Party	Candidate	Votes	%	±%
Labor	Keith Wright	29,936	50.9	+0.1
National	Colin Webber	21,539	36.6	+7.6
Liberal	Alan Agnew	5,385	9.1	−7.9
Democrats	Peter Knack	1,588	2.7	−0.1
Independent	Eric Geissmann	416	0.7	+0.7
Total formal votes		58,864	96.7	
Informal votes		2,019	3.3	
Turnout		60,883	94.0	
Two-party-preferred result
Labor	Keith Wright	31,925	54.2	−2.1
National	Colin Webber	26,934	45.8	+2.1
Labor hold		Swing	−2.1	

==== 1983 ====
1983 Australian federal election: Capricornia
Party	Candidate	Votes	%	±%
Labor	Doug Everingham	36,662	54.4	+3.5
National	Robert Simpson	11,480	17.0	−7.8
Liberal	Alan Agnew	11,465	17.0	+4.9
National	Helen Reeves	5,620	8.3	+8.3
Democrats	Gregory Read	1,881	2.8	−0.6
Socialist	David Ryan	226	0.3	+0.3
Total formal votes		67,334	98.9	
Informal votes		754	1.1	
Turnout		68,088	94.0	
Two-party-preferred result
Labor	Doug Everingham		59.9	+5.6
National	Robert Simpson		40.1	−5.6
Labor hold		Swing	+5.6	

==== 1980 ====
1980 Australian federal election: Capricornia
Party	Candidate	Votes	%	±%
Labor	Doug Everingham	32,688	50.9	+2.0
National Country	Colin Carige	21,292	33.2	−8.1
Liberal	William Park	7,781	12.1	+6.2
Democrats	Lloyd Webber	2,177	3.4	−0.2
Progress	Paul Rackemann	225	0.4	+0.1
Total formal votes		64,162	98.7	
Informal votes		855	1.3	
Turnout		65,017	95.9	
Two-party-preferred result
Labor	Doug Everingham		54.3	+3.1
National Country	Colin Carige		45.7	−3.1
Labor hold		Swing	+3.1	

=== Elections in the 1970s ===
==== 1977 ====
1977 Australian federal election: Capricornia
Party	Candidate	Votes	%	±%
Labor	Doug Everingham	29,996	48.9	+2.0
National Country	Colin Carige	25,314	41.3	+13.6
Liberal	Douglas Cuddy	3,606	5.9	−19.5
Democrats	Edward Batey	2,217	3.6	+3.6
Progress	Ronald Kitching	207	0.3	+0.3
Total formal votes		61,340	98.7	
Informal votes		784	1.3	
Turnout		62,124	96.0	
Two-party-preferred result
Labor	Doug Everingham		51.2	+2.7
National Country	Colin Carige		48.8	−2.7
Labor gain from National Country		Swing	+3.1	

==== 1975 ====
1975 Australian federal election: Capricornia
Party	Candidate	Votes	%	±%
Labor	Doug Everingham	26,874	48.3	−4.0
National Country	Colin Carige	15,035	27.0	+1.4
Liberal	Alfred Millroy	13,735	24.7	+3.7
Total formal votes		55,644	99.1	
Informal votes		513	0.9	
Turnout		56,157	96.1	
Two-party-preferred result
National Country	Colin Carige	27,890	50.1	+5.0
Labor	Doug Everingham	27,754	49.9	−5.0
National Country gain from Labor		Swing	+5.0	

==== 1974 ====
1974 Australian federal election: Capricornia
Party	Candidate	Votes	%	±%
Labor	Doug Everingham	27,951	52.3	−3.5
Country	Kevin Connor	13,713	25.6	+2.2
Liberal	Noel Kenny	11,254	21.0	+6.0
Independent	Therese Warner	556	1.0	+1.0
Total formal votes		53,474	98.9	
Informal votes		590	1.1	
Turnout		54,064	95.3	
Two-party-preferred result
Labor	Doug Everingham		54.9	−3.3
Country	Kevin Connor		45.1	+3.3
Labor hold		Swing	−3.3	

==== 1972 ====
1972 Australian federal election: Capricornia
Party	Candidate	Votes	%	±%
Labor	Doug Everingham	26,632	55.8	−6.6
Country	Kevin Connor	11,176	23.4	+23.4
Liberal	Brian Palmer	7,163	15.0	−16.1
Democratic Labor	Brian Besley	2,743	5.7	−0.8
Total formal votes		47,714	98.6	
Informal votes		685	1.4	
Turnout		48,399	96.0	
Two-party-preferred result
Labor	Doug Everingham		58.2	−5.5
Country	Kevin Connor		42.8	+42.8
Labor hold		Swing	−5.5	

=== Elections in the 1960s ===
==== 1969 ====
1969 Australian federal election: Capricornia
Party	Candidate	Votes	%	±%
Labor	Doug Everingham	28,188	62.4	+13.4
Liberal	Brian Palmer	14,049	31.1	−10.6
Democratic Labor	Alfred Rose	2,950	6.5	−2.8
Total formal votes		45,187	99.1	
Informal votes		413	0.9	
Turnout		45,600	96.3	
Two-party-preferred result
Labor	Doug Everingham		63.7	+12.0
Liberal	Brian Palmer		36.3	−12.0
Labor hold		Swing	+12.0	

==== 1967 by-election ====
1967 Capricornia by-election
Party	Candidate	Votes	%	±%
Labor	Doug Everingham	20,215	53.0	+0.8
Liberal	Frank Rudd	12,048	31.6	−6.9
Country	Glenister Sheil	3,279	8.6	+8.6
Democratic Labor	Peter Boyle	2,628	6.9	−2.4
Total formal votes		38,170	99.2	
Informal votes		316	0.8	
Turnout		38,486	93.7	
Two-party-preferred result
Labor	Doug Everingham		56.0	+1.1
Liberal	Frank Rudd		44.0	−1.1
Labor hold		Swing	+1.1	

==== 1966 ====
1966 Australian federal election: Capricornia
Party	Candidate	Votes	%	±%
Labor	George Gray	20,315	52.2	−3.9
Liberal	Neil McKendry	14,977	38.5	+2.4
Democratic Labor	Peter Boyle	3,635	9.3	+1.5
Total formal votes		38,927	98.8	
Informal votes		482	1.2	
Turnout		39,409	96.4	
Two-party-preferred result
Labor	George Gray		54.9	−2.8
Liberal	Neil McKendry		45.1	+2.8
Labor hold		Swing	−2.8	

==== 1963 ====
1963 Australian federal election: Capricornia
Party	Candidate	Votes	%	±%
Labor	George Gray	21,335	56.1	+6.7
Liberal	Maurice South	13,705	36.1	−2.2
Democratic Labor	Alphonsus Schleger	2,967	7.8	−4.5
Total formal votes		38,007	98.5	
Informal votes		569	1.5	
Turnout		38,576	96.7	
Two-party-preferred result
Labor	George Gray		57.7	+2.7
Liberal	Maurice South		42.3	−2.7
Labor hold		Swing	+2.7	

==== 1961 ====
1961 Australian federal election: Capricornia
Party	Candidate	Votes	%	±%
Labor	George Gray	18,517	49.4	+8.8
Liberal	George Pearce	14,357	38.3	−10.7
Queensland Labor	Mick Gardner	4,606	12.3	+1.9
Total formal votes		37,480	97.7	
Informal votes		891	2.3	
Turnout		38,371	96.5	
Two-party-preferred result
Labor	George Gray	20,606	55.0	+10.7
Liberal	George Pearce	16,874	45.0	−10.7
Labor gain from Liberal		Swing	+10.7	

=== Elections in the 1950s ===
==== 1958 ====
1958 Australian federal election: Capricornia
Party	Candidate	Votes	%	±%
Liberal	George Pearce	18,074	49.0	−4.8
Labor	Colin Maxwell	14,978	40.6	−2.8
Queensland Labor	James Verney	3,830	10.4	+10.4
Total formal votes		36,882	97.3	
Informal votes		1,020	2.7	
Turnout		37,902	97.2	
Two-party-preferred result
Liberal	George Pearce	21,284	57.7	+1.7
Labor	Colin Maxwell	15,598	42.3	−1.7
Liberal hold		Swing	+1.7	

==== 1955 ====
1955 Australian federal election: Capricornia
Party	Candidate	Votes	%	±%
Liberal	George Pearce	19,617	53.8	+0.5
Labor	Colin Maxwell	15,804	43.4	−2.2
Communist	Eric Browne	1,026	2.8	+1.7
Total formal votes		36,447	97.8	
Informal votes		823	2.2	
Turnout		37,270	96.9	
Two-party-preferred result
Liberal	George Pearce		54.0	+0.2
Labor	Colin Maxwell		46.0	−0.2
Liberal hold		Swing	+0.2	

==== 1954 ====
1954 Australian federal election: Capricornia
Party	Candidate	Votes	%	±%
Liberal	George Pearce	18,234	54.9	+3.0
Labor	Mick Gardner	14,318	43.1	−5.0
Communist	Eric Browne	664	2.0	+2.0
Total formal votes		33,216	98.7	
Informal votes		444	1.3	
Turnout		33,660	97.3	
Two-party-preferred result
Liberal	George Pearce		55.1	+3.2
Labor	Mick Gardner		44.9	−3.2
Liberal hold		Swing	+3.2	

==== 1951 ====
1951 Australian federal election: Capricornia
Party	Candidate	Votes	%	±%
Liberal	George Pearce	17,073	51.9	−0.2
Labor	Mick Gardner	15,848	48.1	+1.5
Total formal votes		32,921	99.0	
Informal votes		346	1.0	
Turnout		33,267	96.7	
Liberal hold		Swing	−0.4	

=== Elections in the 1940s ===
==== 1949 ====
1949 Australian federal election: Capricornia
Party	Candidate	Votes	%	±%
Liberal	George Pearce	16,949	52.2	−0.1
Labor	Mick Gardner	15,121	46.6	+2.1
Communist	Ted Robertson	413	1.3	+1.3
Total formal votes		32,483	98.5	
Informal votes		508	1.5	
Turnout		32,991	96.6	
Two-party-preferred result
Liberal	George Pearce		52.3	−2.3
Labor	Mick Gardner		47.7	+2.3
Liberal hold		Swing	−2.3	

==== 1946 ====
1946 Australian federal election: Capricornia
Party	Candidate	Votes	%	±%
Country	Charles Davidson (Note: Davidson was jointly endorsed by the Country Party and Liberal Party. He joined the parliamentary Country Party after his election.)	28,999	49.9	+5.8
Labor	Frank Forde	26,611	45.8	−10.1
Services	Andrew Taylor	2,454	4.2	+4.2
Total formal votes		58,064	98.2	
Informal votes		1,094	1.8	
Turnout		59,158	94.1	
Two-party-preferred result
Country	Charles Davidson	30,731	52.9	+8.8
Labor	Frank Forde	27,333	47.1	−8.8
Country gain from Labor		Swing	+8.8	

==== 1943 ====
1943 Australian federal election: Capricornia
Party	Candidate	Votes	%	±%
Labor	Frank Forde	32,396	55.9	−2.8
United Australia	Charles Ward	25,597	44.1	+44.1
Total formal votes		57,993	98.9	
Informal votes		627	1.1	
Turnout		58,620	95.7	
Labor hold		Swing	−2.8	

==== 1940 ====
1940 Australian federal election: Capricornia
Party	Candidate	Votes	%	±%
Labor	Frank Forde	33,211	58.7	+8.3
Country	Edwin Hiskens	23,330	41.3	+3.3
Total formal votes		56,541	98.7	
Informal votes		733	1.3	
Turnout		57,274	94.7	
Labor hold		Swing	+2.5	

=== Elections in the 1930s ===
==== 1937 ====
1937 Australian federal election: Capricornia
Party	Candidate	Votes	%	±%
Labor	Frank Forde	27,221	50.4	−9.9
Country	Edwin Hiskens	20,543	38.0	+38.0
Social Credit	John Harding	6,235	11.5	+11.5
Total formal votes		53,999	98.5	
Informal votes		849	1.5	
Turnout		54,848	96.2	
Two-party-preferred result
Labor	Frank Forde		56.2	−4.1
Country	Edwin Hiskens		44.8	+45.8
Labor hold		Swing	−4.1	

==== 1934 ====
1934 Australian federal election: Capricornia
Party	Candidate	Votes	%	±%
Labor	Frank Forde	29,902	60.3	+1.0
United Australia	John O'Shanesy	19,706	39.7	+39.7
Total formal votes		49,608	98.1	
Informal votes		965	1.9	
Turnout		50,573	96.5	
Labor hold		Swing	+1.0	

==== 1931 ====
1931 Australian federal election: Capricornia
Party	Candidate	Votes	%	±%
Labor	Frank Forde	28,449	58.8	+5.4
Country	Robert Staines	19,944	41.2	+41.2
Total formal votes		48,393	97.1	
Informal votes		1,455	2.9	
Turnout		49,848	95.6	
Labor hold		Swing	+5.4	

=== Elections in the 1920s ===
==== 1929 ====
1929 Australian federal election: Capricornia
Party	Candidate	Votes	%	±%
Labor	Frank Forde	24,362	53.4	+0.9
Nationalist	Robert Staines	21,277	46.6	+46.6
Total formal votes		45,639	95.6	
Informal votes		2,116	4.4	
Turnout		47,755	94.1	
Labor hold		Swing	+0.9	

==== 1928 ====
1928 Australian federal election: Capricornia
Party	Candidate	Votes	%	±%
Labor	Frank Forde	23,376	52.5	+0.6
Country	Robert Staines	21,114	47.5	−0.6
Total formal votes		44,490	96.3	
Informal votes		1,728	3.7	
Turnout		46,218	93.8	
Labor hold		Swing	+0.6	

==== 1925 ====
1925 Australian federal election: Capricornia
Party	Candidate	Votes	%	±%
Labor	Frank Forde	22,524	51.9	+0.0
Country	William Doherty	20,846	48.1	+41.9
Total formal votes		543,370	97.2	
Informal votes		1,261	2.8	
Turnout		44,631	91.1	
Labor hold		Swing	−0.6	

==== 1922 ====
1922 Australian federal election: Capricornia
Party	Candidate	Votes	%	±%
Labor	Frank Forde	19,904	51.9	+0.5
Nationalist	William Higgs	16,079	41.9	−6.7
Country	Albert Gorrie	2,362	6.2	+6.2
Total formal votes		38,345	96.5	
Informal votes		1,403	3.5	
Turnout		39,748	88.1	
Two-party-preferred result
Labor	Frank Forde		52.5	+1.1
Nationalist	William Higgs		47.5	−1.1
Labor hold		Swing	+1.1	

=== Elections in the 1910s ===
==== 1919 ====
1919 Australian federal election: Capricornia
Party	Candidate	Votes	%	±%
Labor	William Higgs	15,134	52.8	+0.5
Nationalist	Alexander Cameron	13,521	47.2	−0.5
Total formal votes		28,655	98.0	
Informal votes		577	2.0	
Turnout		29,232	87.5	
Labor hold		Swing	+0.5	

==== 1917 ====
1917 Australian federal election: Capricornia
Party	Candidate	Votes	%	±%
Labor	William Higgs	15,544	52.3	−15.1
Nationalist	Robert Duncan	14,153	47.7	+15.1
Total formal votes		29,697	97.9	
Informal votes		638	2.1	
Turnout		30,335	92.1	
Labor hold		Swing	−15.1	

==== 1914 ====
1914 Australian federal election: Capricornia
Party	Candidate	Votes	%	±%
Labor	William Higgs	15,475	67.4	+3.3
Liberal	Neal Macrossan	7,489	32.6	−3.3
Total formal votes		22,964	97.0	
Informal votes		700	3.0	
Turnout		23,664	70.9	
Labor hold		Swing	+3.3	

==== 1913 ====
1913 Australian federal election: Capricornia
Party	Candidate	Votes	%	±%
Labor	William Higgs	15,583	64.1	+6.4
Liberal	Francis Dyer	8,720	35.9	−6.4
Total formal votes		24,303	97.5	
Informal votes		618	2.5	
Turnout		24,921	74.5	
Labor hold		Swing	+6.4	

==== 1910 ====
1910 Australian federal election: Capricornia
Party	Candidate	Votes	%	±%
Labour	William Higgs	11,759	56.8	+12.4
Liberal	Edward Archer	8,950	43.2	−12.4
Total formal votes		20,759	98.0	
Informal votes		413	2.0	
Turnout		21,122	68.0	
Labour gain from Liberal		Swing	+12.4	

=== Elections in the 1900s ===
==== 1906 ====
1906 Australian federal election: Capricornia
Party	Candidate	Votes	%	±%
Anti-Socialist	Edward Archer	7,892	55.6	+25.1
Labour	David Thomson	6,304	44.4	−5.2
Total formal votes		14,196	96.4	
Informal votes		529	3.6	
Turnout		14,725	52.5	
Anti-Socialist gain from Labour		Swing	+15.2	

==== 1903 ====
1903 Australian federal election: Capricornia
Party	Candidate	Votes	%	±%
Labour	David Thomson	6,065	49.6	+0.6
Protectionist	George Curtis	3,725	30.5	+30.5
Ind. Protectionist	Thomas Ryan	2,435	19.9	+19.9
Total formal votes		12,225	97.2	
Informal votes		358	2.8	
Turnout		12,583	58.2	
Labour gain from Ind. Free Trade		Swing	+8.6	

==== 1901 ====
1901 Australian federal election: Capricornia
Party	Candidate	Votes	%	±%
Ind. Free Trade	Alexander Paterson	3,632	51.0	+51.0
Labour	Wallace Nelson	3,493	49.0	+49.0
Total formal votes		7,125	97.8	
Informal votes		160	2.2	
Turnout		7,285	68.3	
Ind. Free Trade win		(new seat)		
