= Members of the Australian House of Representatives, 1966–1969 =

This is a list of members of the Australian House of Representatives from 1966 to 1969, as elected at the 1966 federal election.

Member	Party	Electorate	State	In office
Charles Adermann	Country	Fisher	Qld	1943–1972
Ian Allan ^{[7]}	Country	Gwydir	NSW	1953–1969
Doug Anthony	Country	Richmond	NSW	1957–1984
Bill Armstrong	Country	Riverina	NSW	1965–1969
Bill Arthur	Liberal	Barton	NSW	1966–1969
William Aston	Liberal	Phillip	NSW	1955–1961, 1963–1972
Lance Barnard	Labor	Bass	Tas	1954–1975
Charles Barnes	Country	McPherson	Qld	1958–1972
Jeff Bate	Liberal	Macarthur	NSW	1949–1972
Noel Beaton ^{[6]}	Labor	Bendigo	Vic	1960–1969
Kim Beazley	Labor	Fremantle	WA	1945–1977
Sam Benson	Independent	Batman	Vic	1962–1969
Fred Birrell	Labor	Port Adelaide	SA	1963–1974
Robert Bonnett	Liberal	Herbert	Qld	1966–1977
Len Bosman	Liberal	St George	NSW	1963–1969
Nigel Bowen	Liberal	Parramatta	NSW	1964–1973
William Bridges-Maxwell	Liberal	Robertson	NSW	1964–1969
Kay Brownbill	Liberal	Kingston	SA	1966–1969
Gordon Bryant	Labor	Wills	Vic	1955–1980
Alex Buchanan	Liberal	McMillan	Vic	1955–1972
Les Bury	Liberal	Wentworth	NSW	1956–1974
Jim Cairns	Labor	Yarra	Vic	1955–1977
Kevin Cairns	Liberal	Lilley	Qld	1963–1972, 1974–1980
Sam Calder ^{[1]}	Country Liberal	Northern Territory	NT	1966–1980
Arthur Calwell	Labor	Melbourne	Vic	1940–1972
Clyde Cameron	Labor	Hindmarsh	SA	1949–1980
Don Cameron	Liberal	Griffith	Qld	1966–1990
Fred Chaney Sr.	Liberal	Perth	WA	1955–1969
Don Chipp	Liberal	Higinbotham	Vic	1960–1977
Joe Clark	Labor	Darling	NSW	1934–1969
Richard Cleaver	Liberal	Swan	WA	1955–1969
Fred Collard	Labor	Kalgoorlie	WA	1961–1975
Rex Connor	Labor	Cunningham	NSW	1963–1977
Jim Cope	Labor	Watson	NSW	1955–1975
James Corbett	Country	Maranoa	Qld	1966–1980
Eric Costa	Labor	Banks	NSW	1949–1969
Frank Courtnay	Labor	Darebin	Vic	1958–1969
John Cramer	Liberal	Bennelong	NSW	1949–1974
Frank Crean	Labor	Melbourne Ports	Vic	1951–1977
Manfred Cross	Labor	Brisbane	Qld	1961–1975, 1980–1990
Dan Curtin	Labor	Kingsford-Smith	NSW	1949–1969
Fred Daly	Labor	Grayndler	NSW	1943–1975
Ron Davies	Labor	Braddon	Tas	1958–1975
Len Devine	Labor	East Sydney	NSW	1963–1969
Don Dobie	Liberal	Hughes	NSW	1966–1972, 1975–1996
Nigel Drury	Liberal	Ryan	Qld	1949–1975
Gil Duthie	Labor	Wilmot	Tas	1946–1975
John England	Country	Calare	NSW	1960–1975
Dudley Erwin	Liberal	Ballaarat	Vic	1955–1975
Doug Everingham ^{[3]}	Labor	Capricornia	Qld	1967–1975, 1977–1984
Laurie Failes	Country	Lawson	NSW	1949–1969
David Fairbairn	Liberal	Farrer	NSW	1949–1975
Allen Fairhall	Liberal	Paterson	NSW	1949–1969
Jim Forbes	Liberal	Barker	SA	1956–1975
Max Fox	Liberal	Henty	Vic	1955–1974
Jim Fraser ^{[1]}	Labor	Australian Capital Territory	ACT	1951–1970
Malcolm Fraser	Liberal	Wannon	Vic	1955–1983
Gordon Freeth	Liberal	Forrest	WA	1949–1969
Bill Fulton	Labor	Leichhardt	Qld	1958–1975
Victor Garland ^{[5]}	Liberal	Curtin	WA	1969–1981
Wylie Gibbs	Liberal	Bowman	Qld	1963–1969
Adrian Gibson	Liberal	Denison	Tas	1964–1969
Geoffrey Giles	Liberal	Angas	SA	1964–1983
John Gorton ^{[4]}	Liberal	Higgins	Vic	1968–1975
Bill Graham	Liberal	North Sydney	NSW	1949–1954, 1955–1958, 1966–1980
George Gray ^{[3]}	Labor	Capricornia	Qld	1961–1967
Charles Griffiths	Labor	Shortland	NSW	1949–1972
John Hallett	Country	Canning	WA	1963–1974
Brendan Hansen	Labor	Wide Bay	Qld	1961–1974
Eli Harrison	Labor	Blaxland	NSW	1949–1969
Paul Hasluck ^{[5]}	Liberal	Curtin	WA	1949–1969
William Haworth	Liberal	Isaacs	Vic	1949–1969
Bill Hayden	Labor	Oxley	Qld	1961–1988
Harold Holt ^{[4]}	Liberal	Higgins	Vic	1935–1967
Mac Holten	Country	Indi	Vic	1958–1977
Peter Howson	Liberal	Fawkner	Vic	1955–1972
Tom Hughes	Liberal	Parkes	NSW	1963–1972
Alan Hulme	Liberal	Petrie	Qld	1949–1961, 1963–1972
Ralph Hunt ^{[7]}	Country	Gwydir	NSW	1969–1989
Les Irwin	Liberal	Mitchell	NSW	1961–1972
Bert James	Labor	Hunter	NSW	1960–1980
Alan Jarman	Liberal	Deakin	Vic	1966–1983
John Jess	Liberal	La Trobe	Vic	1960–1972
Don Jessop	Liberal	Grey	SA	1966–1969
Andrew Jones	Liberal	Adelaide	SA	1966–1969
Charles Jones	Labor	Newcastle	NSW	1958–1983
Bob Katter, Sr.	Country	Kennedy	Qld	1966–1990
Bert Kelly	Liberal	Wakefield	SA	1958–1977
David Kennedy ^{[6]}	Labor	Bendigo	Vic	1969–1972
Wilfrid Kent Hughes	Liberal	Chisholm	Vic	1949–1970
James Killen	Liberal	Moreton	Qld	1955–1983
Rob King	Country	Wimmera	Vic	1958–1977
Mervyn Lee	Liberal	Lalor	Vic	1966–1969
Tony Luchetti	Labor	Macquarie	NSW	1951–1975
Philip Lucock	Country	Lyne	NSW	1952–1980
Phillip Lynch	Liberal	Flinders	Vic	1966–1982
Malcolm Mackay	Liberal	Evans	NSW	1963–1972
Don Maisey	Country	Moore	WA	1963–1974
John McEwen	Country	Murray	Vic	1934–1971
Hector McIvor	Labor	Gellibrand	Vic	1955–1972
John McLeay, Jr.	Liberal	Boothby	SA	1966–1981
William McMahon	Liberal	Lowe	NSW	1949–1982
Dan Minogue	Labor	West Sydney	NSW	1949–1969
Dugald Munro	Liberal	Eden-Monaro	NSW	1966–1969
Martin Nicholls	Labor	Bonython	SA	1963–1977
Peter Nixon	Country	Gippsland	Vic	1961–1983
William O'Connor	Labor	Dalley	NSW	1946–1969
Hubert Opperman ^{[2]}	Liberal	Corio	Vic	1949–1967
Rex Patterson	Labor	Dawson	Qld	1966–1975
Andrew Peacock	Liberal	Kooyong	Vic	1966–1994
Thomas Pearsall	Liberal	Franklin	Tas	1966–1969
Ted Peters	Labor	Scullin	Vic	1949–1969
Ian Pettitt	Country	Hume	NSW	1963–1972
Ian Robinson	Country	Cowper	NSW	1963–1990
Edward St John	Liberal/Independent	Warringah	NSW	1966–1969
Gordon Scholes ^{[2]}	Labor	Corio	Vic	1967–1993
Ian Sinclair	Country	New England	NSW	1963–1998
Billy Snedden	Liberal	Bruce	Vic	1955–1983
Frank Stewart	Labor	Lang	NSW	1953–1979
Philip Stokes	Liberal	Maribyrnong	Vic	1955–1969
Tony Street	Liberal	Corangamite	Vic	1966–1984
Reginald Swartz	Liberal	Darling Downs	Qld	1949–1972
Winton Turnbull	Country	Mallee	Vic	1946–1972
Harry Turner	Liberal	Bradfield	NSW	1952–1974
Tom Uren	Labor	Reid	NSW	1958–1990
Harry Webb	Labor	Stirling	WA	1954–1958, 1961–1972
Bill Wentworth	Liberal	Mackellar	NSW	1949–1977
Gough Whitlam	Labor	Werriwa	NSW	1952–1978
Ray Whittorn	Liberal	Balaclava	Vic	1960–1974
Ian Wilson	Liberal	Sturt	SA	1966–1969, 1972–1993

^{1} At this time, the members for the Northern Territory and Australian Capital Territory could only vote on matters relating to their respective territories.
^{2} The Liberal member for Corio, Hubert Opperman, resigned on 10 June 1967 to accept an appointment as Australia's first High Commissioner to Malta; Labor candidate Gordon Scholes won the resulting by-election on 22 July 1967.
^{3} The Labor member for Capricornia, George Gray, died on 2 August 1967; Labor candidate Doug Everingham won the resulting by-election on 30 September 1967.
^{4} The Prime Minister and Liberal member for Higgins, Harold Holt, was presumed dead on 19 December 1967, after disappearing two days earlier while swimming at Portsea; Liberal candidate John Gorton won the resulting by-election on 24 February 1968.
^{5} The Liberal member for Curtin, Paul Hasluck, resigned on 10 February 1969 to accept an appointment as Governor-General of Australia; Liberal candidate Victor Garland won the resulting by-election on 19 April 1969.
^{6} The Labor member for Bendigo, Noel Beaton, resigned on 9 April 1969; Labor candidate David Kennedy won the resulting by-election on 7 June 1969.
^{7} The Country Party member for Gwydir, Ian Allan, resigned on 30 April 1969; Country Party candidate Ralph Hunt won the resulting by-election on 7 June 1969.
