= Alexander Paterson (Australian politician) =

Australian politician

The Honourable Alexander Paterson
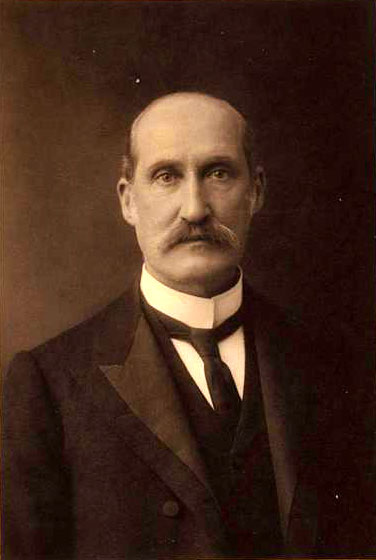

Member of the Australian Parliament for Capricornia
- In office 30 March 1901 – 23 November 1903
- Preceded by: New seat
- Succeeded by: David Thomson

Personal details
- Born: 24 January 1844 Greenock, Scotland
- Died: 23 March 1908 (aged 64) Melbourne, Victoria, Australia
- Party: Independent
- Occupation: Shipping manager

Alexander Paterson (24 January 1844 – 23 March 1908) was an independent member of the Australian House of Representatives, representing the Division of Capricornia, Queensland.

Born in Greenock, Scotland, Paterson worked as a shipping manager before migrating to Australia in 1875. In Australia, Paterson was involved in business ventures in Melbourne and Queensland, gaining enough stature in Queensland to be elected to the inaugural Australian parliament.

Paterson contested the seat of Capricornia in the 1901 Federal election, winning by a margin of 139 votes over the ALP candidate Wallace Nelson.

On 15 June 1901, during the first parliament of the Commonwealth, the Immigration Restriction Bill 1901 was introduced, defined as A Bill for an Act to place certain restrictions on Immigration and to provide for the removal from the Commonwealth of Prohibited Immigrants.

The wording of the bill also listed in its definitions that restrictions "means any person who is unable to write out 50 words in a European language dictated by an officer".

Paterson spoke in favour of the bill, and in particular of the 'Chinese problem'. The bill was subsequently passed, and set in motion what is popularly known as the White Australia policy, which survived until late in the 20th century.

Paterson did not contest the subsequent election for health reasons, and retired from politics. He died at his home in Melbourne on 23 March 1908, after years of ill health. He was survived by his wife and five children.

Parliament of Australia
New division	Member for Capricornia; 1901–1903	Succeeded by David Thomson
