= Kirsten Livermore =

Australian politician

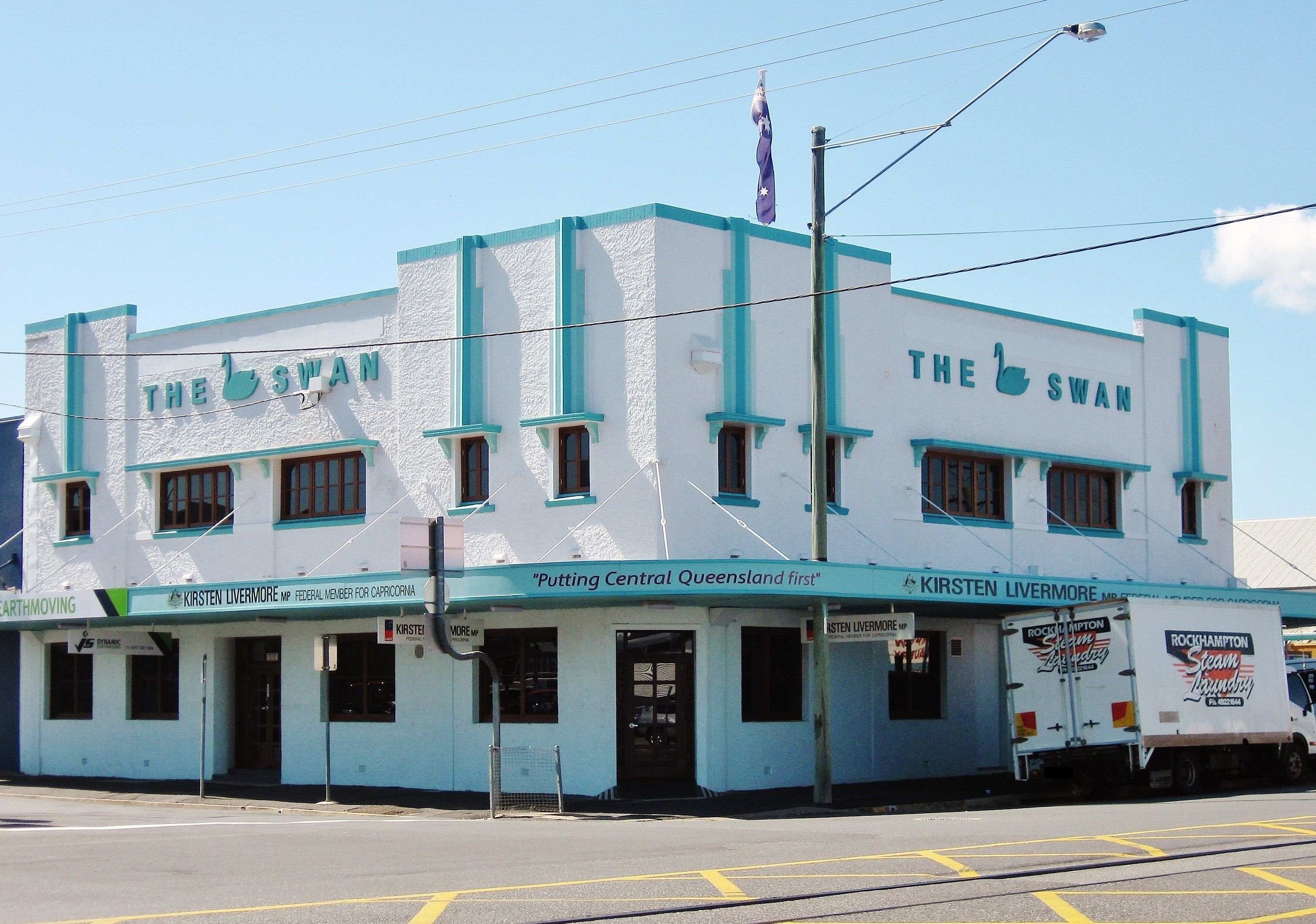
- Kirsten Livermore's electorate office in Rockhampton, 2012

Member of the Australian Parliament for Capricornia
- In office 3 October 1998 – 5 August 2013
- Preceded by: Paul Marek
- Succeeded by: Michelle Landry

Personal details
- Born: 10 November 1969 (age 57) Mackay, Queensland
- Party: Australian Labor Party
- Education: University of Queensland
- Occupation: Solicitor

Kirsten Fiona Livermore (born 10 November 1969) is an Australian former politician. She was an Australian Labor Party member of the Australian House of Representatives from October 1998 until August 2013, representing the Division of Capricornia, Queensland.

Livermore was born in Mackay, Queensland, and was educated at the University of Queensland. She was a solicitor and an organiser with the Community and Public Sector Union before entering politics.

On 27 November 2012, Livermore announced that she would not stand in the federal election to be held in 2013.

Following her retirement from politics, Livermore lived in the United Kingdom with her family for 16 months where she studied a masters of international development at the London School of Economics.

In 2015, Livermore moved back to Australia basing herself in Canberra where she began working for the Minerals Council of Australia.

After taking a break for 18 months, Livermore was offered a job in September 2019 as team leader working for Australia Mongolia Extractives Program, an Australian Government-funded company which works with the Government of Mongolia on mining investment in Mongolia. Livermore's position is mostly based in Ulaanbaatar, with her team responsible for bringing in Australian geologists and engineers to assist the Mongolian Government with mining reform.

Parliament of Australia
Preceded by Paul Marek	Member for Capricornia; 1998–2013	Succeeded by Michelle Landry
