= Colin Carige =

Australian politician

Member of the Australian Parliament for Capricornia
- In office 13 December 1975 – 10 December 1977
- Preceded by: Doug Everingham
- Succeeded by: Doug Everingham

Personal details
- Born: 19 July 1938 Mount Morgan, Queensland, Australia
- Died: 15 May 2002 (aged 63) Brisbane, Queensland, Australia
- Party: National Country Party
- Spouse: Gloria Carige [nee Hardy]
- Occupation: Business owner

Colin Lawrence Carige (19 July 1938 – 15 May 2002), Australian politician, was a member of the Australian House of Representatives from 1975 to 1977, representing the Division of Capricornia. He held the seat for the National Country Party.

Carige was born in Mount Morgan. His livelihood was earned in small business, having variously owned a restaurant, a cattle grazing property, and a construction business.

Colin Carige married his wife Gloria Carige [nee Hardy] and had three children. Julie, Lawrence and Susan. He was grandfather to four grandchildren. Daniel, Erin and Anna who were born to Julie and Jillian who was born to Lawrence.

Carige died of acute myeloid leukemia in May 2002.

In Parliament on 24 June 2002, Senator Ron Boswell alluded to his country upbringing in his speech of condolence:

"At the time of his election he sold himself to his constituents as a correspondence-educated Biloela grazier, a clearing contractor and a bulldozer driver. You do not see too many bulldozer drivers in parliament today; in fact, you do not see too many self-educated people coming into this place."

Parliament of Australia
Preceded by Doug Everingham	Member for Capricornia; 1975–1977	Succeeded by Doug Everingham
