= Paul Marek =

Australian politician

Member of the Australian Parliament for Capricornia
- In office 2 March 1996 – 3 October 1998
- Preceded by: Marjorie Henzell
- Succeeded by: Kirsten Livermore

Personal details
- Born: 25 July 1964 (age 61) Mount Isa, Queensland, Australia
- Party: National Party of Australia

Paul Marek (born 25 July 1964) is an Australian politician. He was National Party member of the Australian House of Representatives from 1996 until 1998, representing the regional Queensland-based seat of Capricornia.

Paul Marek was born at Mount Isa. He was a fitter and turner by trade, working at the Blair Athol coal mine at the time of his election, and operated his own smash repair business at Clermont. He was also a Shire of Belyando councillor, a local vice-president of the Australian Metal Workers' Union, and held a pilot's license.

Paul Marek was elected to the House of Representatives at the 1996 federal election, winning the marginal seat of Capricornia from Labor MP Marjorie Henzell in the major Liberal victory that year. During the campaign, he said that he "did not support the gay and lesbian movement" and "would prefer if they were back over the border where they were some 10, 15 years ago." In November 1996, it emerged in parliament that the Civil Aviation Safety Authority had decided not to prosecute the newly-elected Marek for unauthorised and substandard plane maintenance, leading to opposition allegations of "special treatment".

Marek became one of three outspoken right-wing Queensland Nationals MPs (along with De-Anne Kelly and Bob Katter) who broke with their own government's line on numerous occasions. In October 1997, the three MPs crossed the floor to support "about 40" amendments to the government's native title legislation after the Wik High Court case, with the intent of further restricting native title beyond the government's bill; however, Marek voted for the final bill after their amendments were voted down. In November, Marek stated that he wanted all Indigenous services to be abolished after the Wik legislation passed and said that land should have been bought from Indigenous people in earlier years, stating "all we would have to give them is 20 bucks and a box of Jatz". The Labor opposition attacked the remarks in parliament as "disgraceful" and "appalling and contemptible" and called for an apology, but senior colleagues Ron Boswell and John Herron refused to criticise him.

During the 1998 federal election campaign, Marek spoke of the challenges of selling Coalition policy in his electorate amidst the rise of the new One Nation Party and broke with his party on two major policies. He stated that there was "no guarantee" that he would support his government's flagship goods and services tax proposal, noting that he believed "about 40 percent" of Australians opposed the GST altogether. He suggested that he would cross the floor to vote against it if his electorate opposed it, and requested that fruit and vegetables be granted an exemption from the tax. Marek was also resistant to the privatisation of Telstra, stating that he would not support the sale of any more than 49% of it. Along with Kelly and Katter, he broke with his national colleagues and directed preferences to One Nation above Labor at the election. The Sydney Morning Herald suggested during the campaign that Marek had "managed to neutralise much of the One Nation" insurrection" through his renegade policy stances and preference decisions. However, he was resoundingly defeated at the 1998 election by Labor candidate Kirsten Livermore.

In 1999, he was the Townsville organiser of the "No" campaign in the 1999 Australian republic referendum.

Parliament of Australia
Preceded by Marjorie Henzell	Member for Capricornia; 1996–1998	Succeeded by Kirsten Livermore
