= David Thomson (Labor Party politician) =

Australian politician

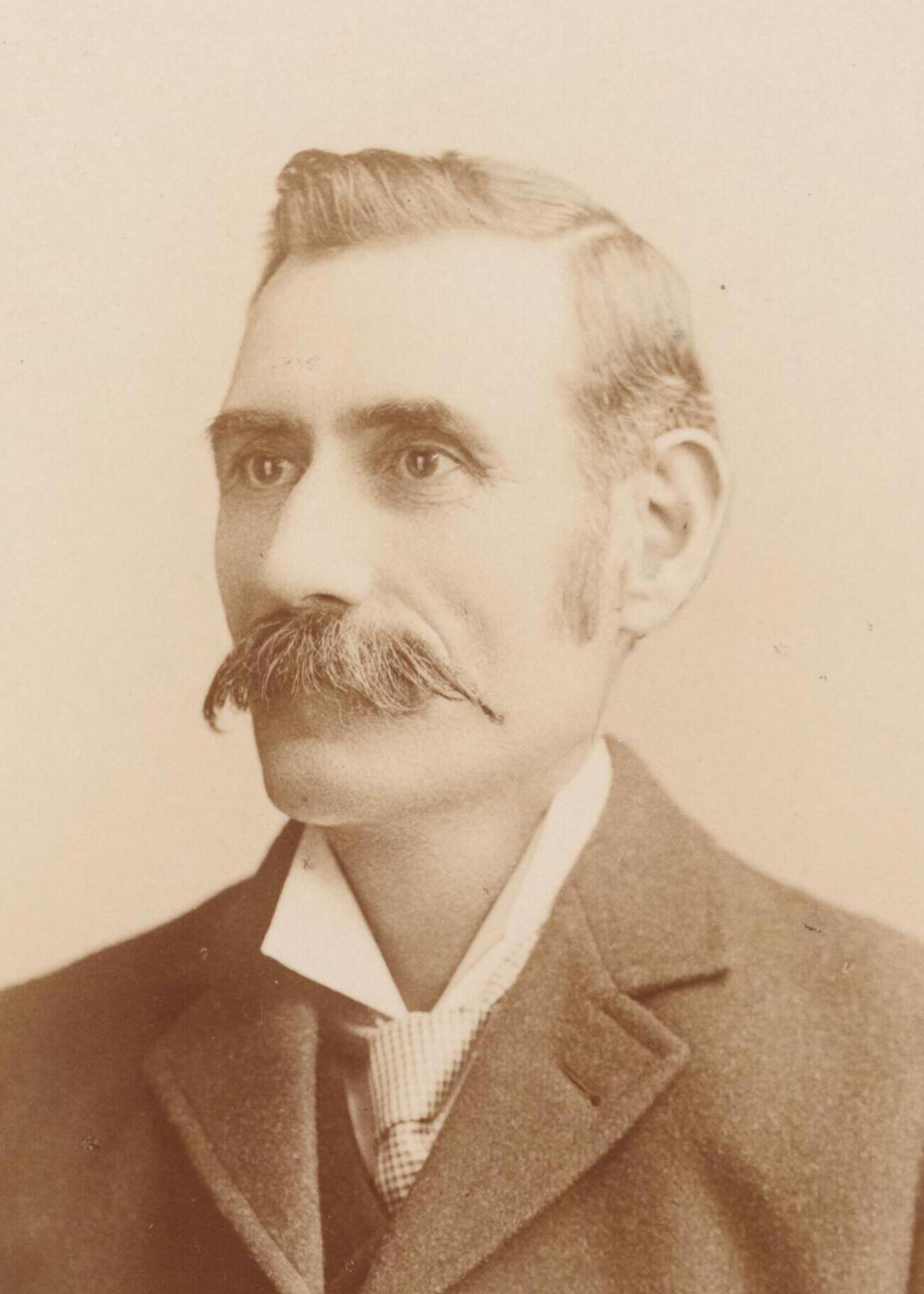
- Thomson c. 1904

Member of the Australian Parliament for Capricornia
- In office 16 December 1903 – 12 December 1906
- Preceded by: Alexander Paterson
- Succeeded by: Edward Archer

Personal details
- Born: David Alexander Thomson; 26 February 1856 Melbourne, Victoria, Australia
- Died: 30 October 1926 (aged 70) Bushley, Queensland, Australia
- Party: Labor
- Occupation: Businessman

David Alexander Thomson (26 February 1856 – 30 October 1926) was an Australian businessman and politician. He was a member of the House of Representatives from 1903 to 1906, holding the Queensland seat of Capricornia for the Australian Labor Party (ALP).

== Early life ==
Thomson was born in 1856 in Melbourne. He lived for periods in both Victoria and New South Wales, working a number of jobs "including contract tank-sinking, wool carrying, hotel-keeping and road contracting". Having spent time on the Victorian goldfields, he moved to Coolgardie in 1894 during the Western Australian gold rush. He moved to Queensland in the late 1890s.

== Business interests ==
In New South Wales, Thomson and his wife ran hotels in Katoomba, Bathurst, and Tenterfield. After moving to Queensland they controlled the Cosmopolitan Hotel, the Prince Consort Hotel, and the Osborne Hotel in Sandgate for periods.

Thomson moved to Rockhampton in 1900 where he ran the Commercial Hotel and the Masonic Hotel. In 1902 he acquired the Rockhampton Aerated Water Company, a cordial factory which he "built up into a business of considerable magnitude". The business was later taken over by his son Francis David Thomson.

In 1918, Thomson took over a farming property at Bushley. He introduced Friesian cattle to the district and was one of the first to use motorised tractors and milking machines.

== Politics ==
Thomson was a member of the Australian House of Representatives, representing the Division of Capricornia, Queensland, between 16 December 1903 until 12 December 1906. He was a member of the Australian Labor Party.

== Personal life ==
Thomson married Mary Jane Tonsing and had at least nine children.

Thomson died at his home in Bushley on 30 October 1926, aged 70.

Parliament of Australia
Preceded by Alexander Paterson	Member for Capricornia; 1903–1906	Succeeded by Edward Archer
