= Marjorie Henzell =

Australian politician

Member of the Australian Parliament for Capricornia
- In office 13 March 1993 – 2 March 1996
- Preceded by: Keith Wright
- Succeeded by: Paul Marek

Personal details
- Born: 21 September 1948 (age 77) Melbourne, Victoria, Australia
- Party: Australian Labor Party
- Relations: Claire Maxwell (niece); Fleur Maxwell (niece)

Marjorie Madeline Henzell (born 21 September 1948) is a former Australian politician. She was an Australian Labor Party member of the Australian House of Representatives from 1993 to 1996, representing the electorate of Capricornia.

== Early life ==
Henzell graduated from the University of Melbourne with a Bachelor of Arts and Diploma of Social Studies before becoming a social worker. At the time of her election to parliament, she managed a counselling service supporting the employees of two coal mines at Middlemount and Tieri outside Rockhampton, along with their associated communities.

== Political career ==
=== Federal politics ===
She was elected to the House of Representatives at the 1993 federal election, defeating disgraced ex-Labor MP Keith Wright, who was recontesting as an independent despite facing criminal child sex charges. Henzell became the first woman MP to hold the seat in its history. She later described her ability to be elected as a woman in Capricornia at that time as a "quirk of history" and that she was "only here" because of Wright's conduct. Henzell was aligned with the party's Labor Left faction. She was appointed deputy chairman of the Labor caucus in 1993.

As a new MP, Henzell described Question Time as "a bit of a boys' locker room" and described her own approach to parliament as a woman as "I won't sit around being patted on the head. We didn't get here to be sweet and malleable, but we can play hard ball without personal abuse." She publicly criticised senior colleague John Dawkins for referring to opposition MP Kathy Sullivan as "sweetheart" in parliament in 1993. In 1994, she questioned her own party's Prime Minister, Paul Keating, about his decision to personally take over the women's affairs portfolio following the resignation of Ros Kelly, asking him if he did not believe anyone in the caucus was sufficiently able; an angry Keating claimed Henzell was sexist, and Henzell expressed her annoyance at not being taken seriously over the issue.

In 1994, as chairwoman of a federal parliamentary inquiry into the implementation of the recommendations of the Royal Commission into Black Deaths in Custody, Henzell attacked state governments for not using or inappropriately using $50 million in federal implementation funding, stating (in relation to New South Wales) that "two years down the track no service has been put into place for the people they were designed to assist", criticising the poor state of services for Aboriginal people, and stating "the only conclusion you can draw is the fact that there is a continuing abrogation of people's rights...the fact that we are tolerating this sort of racism diminishes us as a country." She also lambasted the Victorian government for failing to implement key recommendations of the Royal Commission and failing to submit reports on its implementation progress.

In October 1994, in relation to a contentious debate on a sexual privacy bill, Henzell claimed in parliament that "we are all born bisexual", which made front-page news in the Rockhampton newspaper The Morning Bulletin and led to her receiving many angry letters from constituents; she subsequently clarified that her comment "was not referring to people's sexual orientation; it referred to the fact that we all have male and female traits and hormones and that human sexuality is a widely misunderstood subject". In September 1995, she was one of several Labor MPs to speak in parliament against a bill to sell off the Australian National Line, even though she later voted for it in line with caucus solidarity rules. Throughout all or most of her term, she was a member of the Joint Select Committee on Certain Family Law Issues and the House of Representatives Standing Committees on Aboriginal and Torres Strait Islander Affairs and Long Term Strategies. She was defeated by National Party candidate Paul Marek at the 1996 federal election.

=== Municipal council ===
She later relocated to Armidale in New South Wales and was an unsuccessful candidate for the Armidale Dumaresq Council in 2004. She remained involved with the Labor Party and served as secretary of the party's Armidale State Electoral Council.

== Later years ==
Post-politics, Henzell has lived in Armidale, and worked as a senior social worker before retiring. She has contributed as a community member to a New England charity.

Parliament of Australia
Preceded by Keith Wright	Member for Capricornia; 1993–1996	Succeeded by Paul Marek
