= Michelle Landry =

Australian politician

The Honourable Michelle Landry MP
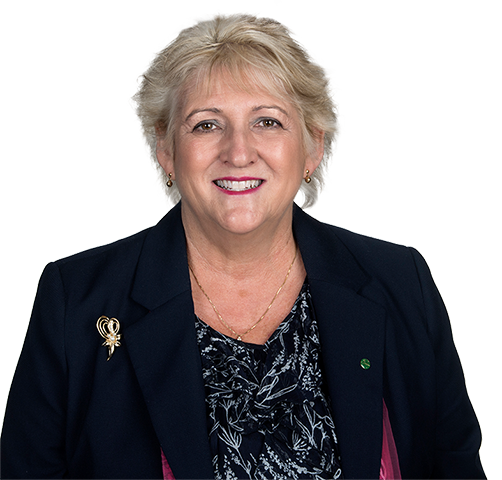
- Landry in 2019

Assistant Minister for Northern Australia
- In office 6 February 2020 – 23 May 2022
- Prime Minister: Scott Morrison
- Preceded by: New title
- Succeeded by: Office abolished

Assistant Minister for Children and Families
- In office 28 August 2018 – 23 May 2022
- Prime Minister: Scott Morrison
- Preceded by: David Gillespie

Member of the Australian Parliament for Capricornia
- Incumbent
- Assumed office 7 September 2013
- Preceded by: Kirsten Livermore

Personal details
- Born: Michelle Leanne Martin; 15 October 1962 (age 64) Rockhampton, Queensland, Australia
- Party: Nationals (LNP)
- Children: 2
- Occupation: Business owner
- Website: michellelandry.com.au

Michelle Leanne Landry (née Martin; born 15 October 1962) is an Australian politician who has been a member of the House of Representatives since the 2013 federal election, representing the Division of Capricornia. Landry served as the Assistant Minister for Children and Families (2018–2022) and as the Assistant Minister for Northern Australia (2020–2022) in the Morrison government. She is a member of the Liberal National Party of Queensland, and sits with the Nationals in federal parliament.

== Early life and career ==
Landry was born in Rockhampton, Queensland. She was educated at Hall State School and Rockhampton Girls Grammar.

From 1978 to 1985, Landry worked as a pathology and medical biochemistry laboratory assistant. From 1985 to 2007, she worked at the National Australia Bank. She ran a local bookkeeping business from 1999 to 2009.

== Political career ==
Landry contested the seat of Capricornia for the first time in the 2010 federal election. Her opponent, long-term Labor MP Kirsten Livermore defeated her in a 54–46 two-party-preferred vote; an 8-point swing to the LNP. Following the retirement of Livermore in 2013, Landry won the seat in the 2013 federal election. She was reelected in the 2016, the 2019 and the 2022 federal elections.

In February 2018, Landry became the National Party's Chief whip in the House of Representatives. She was replaced by Damian Drum following her appointment as an assistant minister.

In August 2018, Landry was appointed as the Assistant Minister for Children and Families in the Morrison government. She was additionally appointed Assistant Minister for Northern Australia in February 2020; and held both positions until May 2022, following the appointment of the Albanese ministry. Following the resignation of Bridget McKenzie in February 2020, she was the National Party's only female member of the ministry until McKenzie was reappointed in July 2021.

In May 2025, Landry was appointed as the National Party's Chief whip for the second time.

On 23 October 2026, Landry announced that she will not contest her seat at the next federal election.

=== CFMEU bullying allegations ===
In November 2014, Landry claimed to the media that she, her daughter, and son-in-law, had been targeted with bullying and intimidation by representatives from the Construction, Forestry, Mining and Energy Union (CFMEU). Landry did not make an official complaint about the alleged harassment to police or the union. The publicly aired allegations prompted the CFMEU's district president, Stephen Smyth to demand Landry apologise to union members and Blackwater residents, and described the allegations as baseless. Smyth said the union was offended by Landry's comments as it fights against bullying on a daily basis. He said that if she had any evidence, she should have taken it to the police.

=== "Wishy washy" comments ===
In April 2016, Landry drew national attention when she repeatedly aired criticisms to the media about her own government being "wishy washy". Her comments prompted senior government ministers to defend the government's performance, including Prime Minister Malcolm Turnbull, National Party leader Barnaby Joyce, and Industry Minister Christopher Pyne.

=== Adani political donations ===
Questions were raised after Adani attended a fundraiser for Landry's 2019 federal election campaign and made donations of $60,800 to the Liberal and National parties. Landry is a strong backer of the controversial Adani Carmichael coal mine project.

== Personal life ==
Landry owns properties in Griffith in Canberra and Lammermoor in Queensland.

Parliament of Australia
| Preceded by Kirsten Livermore | Member for Capricornia; 2013–present | Incumbent |
