= 1967 Capricornia by-election =

← 1966	30 September 1967	1969 →

The Capricornia seat in the House of Representatives
- Turnout: 38,486 (93.7%)
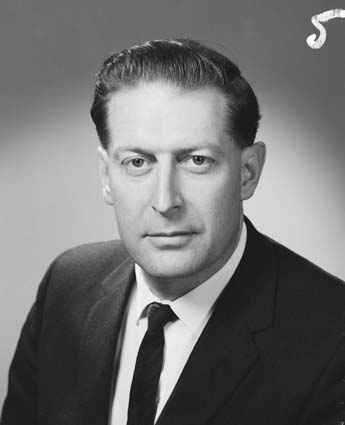

	First party	Second party
Candidate	Doug Everingham	Frank Rudd
Party	Labor	Liberal
Popular vote	20,215	12,048
Percentage	53.0%	31.6%
Swing	▲0.8	▼6.9
MP before election
George Gray
Labor
Elected MP
Doug Everingham
Labor

A by-election was held for the Australian House of Representatives seat of Capricornia on 30 September 1967. This was triggered by the death of Labor MP George Gray.

The by-election was won by Labor candidate Doug Everingham.

== Candidates ==
The ALP candidate Doug Everingham and Liberal candidate Frank Rudd were brothers-in-law, with their wives being sisters. The Country Party candidate William Glenister Sheil was the father of future senator Glen Sheil.

The Democratic Labor Party directed its preferences to the Country Party, followed by the Liberal Party and the ALP.

== Results ==
Capricornia by-election, 1967
Party	Candidate	Votes	%	±%
Labor	Doug Everingham	20,215	53.0	+0.8
Liberal	Frank Rudd	12,048	31.6	−6.9
Country	Glen Sheil	3,279	8.6	+8.6
Democratic Labor	Peter Boyle	2,628	6.9	−2.4
Total formal votes		38,170	99.2	
Informal votes		316	0.8	
Turnout		38,486	93.7	
Two-party-preferred result
Labor	Doug Everingham		56.0	+1.1
Liberal	Frank Rudd		44.0	−1.1
Labor hold		Swing	+1.1	
