= Division of Capricornia =

Australian federal electoral division

Coordinates: 22.051°S 148.189°E

Capricornia Australian House of Representatives Division
- Interactive map of boundaries since the 2019 federal election
- Created: 1901
- MP: Michelle Landry
- Party: National (Note: Member of the Liberal National Party of Queensland sitting with the federal parliamentary National Party.)
- Namesake: Tropic of Capricorn
- Electors: 115,175 (2025)
- Area: 90,903 km^{2} (35,097.8 sq mi)
- Demographic: Rural and provincial
Electorates around Capricornia:
Kennedy	Dawson	Coral Sea
Kennedy	Capricornia	Coral Sea
Maranoa	Flynn	Flynn

The Division of Capricornia is an Australian electoral division in the state of Queensland. It comprises the city of Rockhampton and stretches along the Pacific coast until the southwestern outer suburbs of Mackay.

Capricornia was traditionally a Labor-voting electorate, having been Labor-held for 72 years of the 100 years since 1922. However, it has trended towards the Coalition since 2013. That political realignment was particularly noticeable at the 2019 federal election as blue-collar but highly paid mining workers deserted Labor for Pauline Hanson's One Nation and the Coalition. Similar voting trends occurred in the nearby electorates of Flynn and Dawson, as well as in Leichhardt.

Since 2013, its MP has been Michelle Landry of the National Party.

== Geography ==
Since 1984, federal electoral division boundaries in Australia have been determined at redistributions by a redistribution committee appointed by the Australian Electoral Commission. Redistributions occur for the boundaries of divisions in a particular state, and they occur every seven years, or sooner if a state's representation entitlement changes or when divisions of a state are malapportioned.

The Division of Capricornia includes the city of Rockhampton, as well as neighbouring towns such as Yeppoon and Emu Park.

== History ==
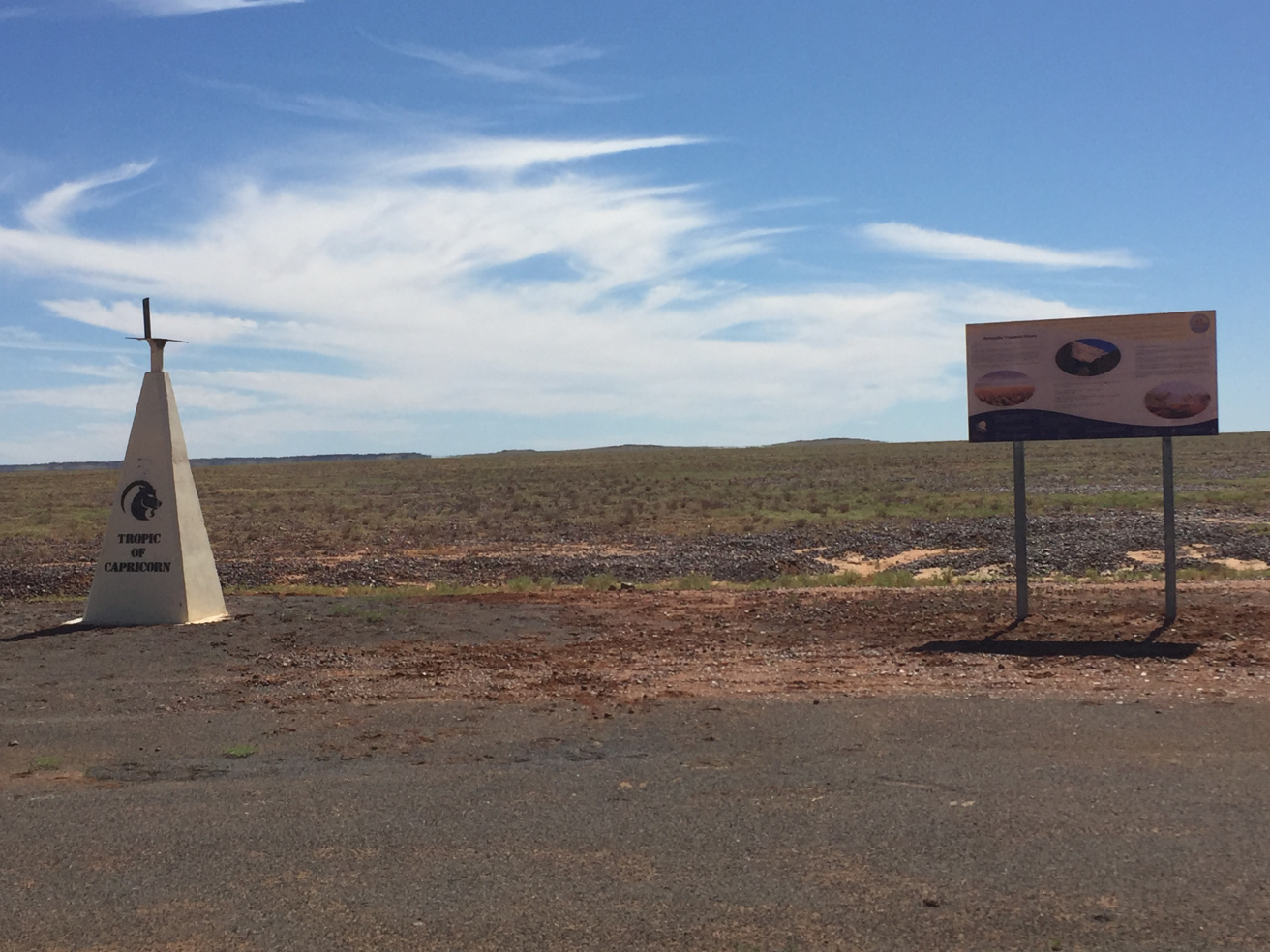
The Tropic of Capricorn, the division's namesake, here seen in Amaroo

The division was one of the original 65 divisions contested at the first federal election. It is named after the Tropic of Capricorn, which runs through the Division. It is located on the central Queensland coast and its centre has always been the city of Rockhampton. On its current boundaries it also includes the town of Yeppoon and Ooralea, Marian and Sarina, all southern suburbs of Mackay.

The first election saw Alexander Paterson, with 51% of votes, narrowly elected over the ALP candidate Wallace Nelson. For most of its subsequent history it has been a fairly safe seat for the ALP. This was especially true when Gladstone was part of the seat from 1901 to 1984. Even after Gladstone was redistributed to Hinkler in 1984 (it is now part of Flynn), it remained one of the few non-metropolitan seats where Labor consistently did well. Labor held it for all but two terms from 1961 to 2013, the two exceptions being the high-tide elections of 1975 and 1996. Its best-known member was Frank Forde, who was briefly Prime Minister of Australia in 1945.

Capricornia is currently held by Michelle Landry for the Liberal National Party who in 2016, became the first conservative MP to serve more than one term in the seat since George Pearce.

== Members ==
Image	Member	Party	Term	Notes
	Alexander Paterson (1844–1908)	Independent Free Trade	30 March 1901 – 23 November 1903	Retired
	David Thomson (1856–1926)	Labour	16 December 1903 – 12 December 1906	Lost seat
	Edward Archer (1871–1940)	Anti-Socialist	12 December 1906 – 26 May 1909	Was the first MP who chose to make an affirmation rather than swearing an oath. Lost seat. Later elected to the Legislative Assembly of Queensland seat of Normanby in 1914
	Edward Archer (1871–1940)	Liberal	26 May 1909 – 13 April 1910	Was the first MP who chose to make an affirmation rather than swearing an oath. Lost seat. Later elected to the Legislative Assembly of Queensland seat of Normanby in 1914
	William Higgs (1862–1951)	Labor	13 April 1910 – January 1920	Previously a member of the Senate. Served as minister under Hughes. Lost seat
	William Higgs (1862–1951)	Independent	January 1920 – September 1920	Previously a member of the Senate. Served as minister under Hughes. Lost seat
	William Higgs (1862–1951)	Nationalist	September 1920 – 16 December 1922	Previously a member of the Senate. Served as minister under Hughes. Lost seat
	Frank Forde (1890–1983)	Labor	16 December 1922 – 28 September 1946	Previously held the Legislative Assembly of Queensland seat of Rockhampton. Served as minister under Scullin, Curtin and Chifley. Served as deputy prime minister under Curtin and Chifley. Served as Prime Minister in 1945. Lost seat. Later elected to the Legislative Assembly of Queensland seat of Flinders in 1955
	Charles Davidson (1897–1985)	Country	28 September 1946 – 10 December 1949	Transferred to the Division of Dawson
	George Pearce (1917–1992)	Liberal	10 December 1949 – 9 December 1961	Served as Chief Government Whip in the House under Menzies. Lost seat
	George Gray (1903–1967)	Labor	9 December 1961 – 2 August 1967	Died in office
	Doug Everingham (1923–2017)	Labor	30 September 1967 – 13 December 1975	Served as minister under Whitlam. Lost seat
	Colin Carige (1938–2002)	National Country	13 December 1975 – 10 December 1977	Lost seat
	Doug Everingham (1923–2017)	Labor	10 December 1977 – 26 October 1984	Retired
	Keith Wright (1942–2015)	Labor	26 October 1984 – 4 December 1992	Previously held the Legislative Assembly of Queensland seat of Rockhampton. Lost preselection and then lost seat
	Keith Wright (1942–2015)	Independent	4 December 1992 – 13 March 1993	Previously held the Legislative Assembly of Queensland seat of Rockhampton. Lost preselection and then lost seat
	Marjorie Henzell (1948–)	Labor	13 March 1993 – 2 March 1996	Lost seat
	Paul Marek (1964–)	Nationals	2 March 1996 – 3 October 1998	Lost seat
	Kirsten Livermore (1969–)	Labor	3 October 1998 – 5 August 2013	Retired
	Michelle Landry (1962–)	National	7 September 2013 – present	Incumbent

== Election results ==
2025 Australian federal election: Capricornia
Party	Candidate	Votes	%	±%
Liberal National	Michelle Landry	36,074	36.56	−2.88
Labor	Emily Mawson	31,483	31.91	+3.86
One Nation	Cheryl Kempton	15,355	15.56	+0.96
Greens	Mick Jones	6,101	6.18	+0.31
Trumpet of Patriots	Stephen Andrew	5,999	6.08	+6.08
Family First	Kerri Hislop	3,646	3.70	+3.70
Total formal votes		98,658	96.53	+2.67
Informal votes		3,547	3.47	−2.67
Turnout		102,205	88.77	+0.17
Two-party-preferred result
Liberal National	Michelle Landry	55,085	55.83	−0.76
Labor	Emily Mawson	43,573	44.17	+0.76
Liberal National hold		Swing	−0.76	
