= Doug Everingham =

Australian politician

The Honourable Doug Everingham
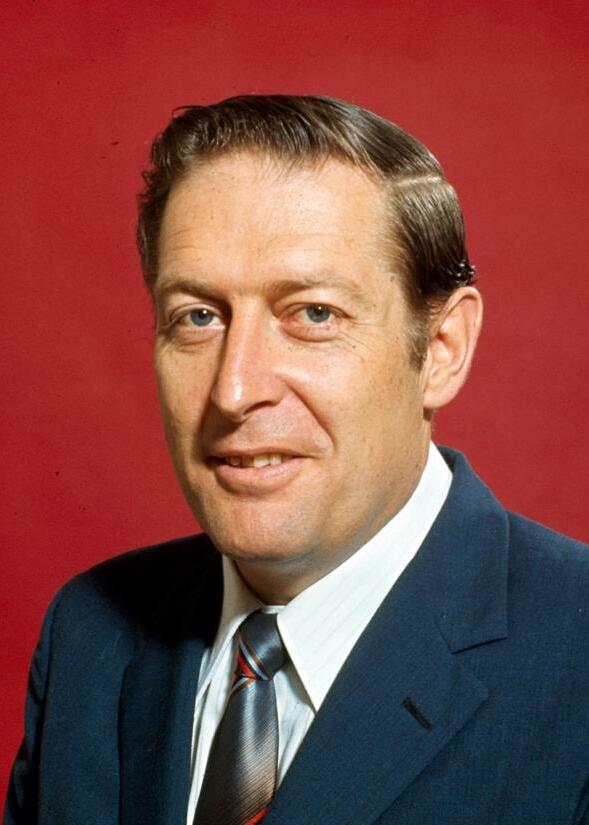
- Official portrait, 1973

Minister for Health
- In office 19 December 1972 – 11 November 1975
- Prime Minister: Gough Whitlam
- Preceded by: Lance Barnard (acting)
- Succeeded by: Don Chipp

Member of the Australian Parliament for Capricornia
- In office 30 September 1967 – 13 December 1975
- Preceded by: George Gray
- Succeeded by: Colin Carige
- In office 10 December 1977 – 26 October 1984
- Preceded by: Colin Carige
- Succeeded by: Keith Wright

Personal details
- Born: 25 June 1923 Wauchope, New South Wales, Australia
- Died: 24 August 2017 (aged 94)
- Party: Labor
- Education: University of Sydney
- Occupation: Doctor

Douglas Nixon Everingham (25 June 1923 – 24 August 2017) was an Australian politician who served as Minister for Health in the Whitlam government from 1972 to 1975. He represented the Labor Party in the House of Representatives from 1967 to 1975 and 1977 to 1984. He is remembered for his pivotal role in the formation of the Whitlam government's Medicare program.

== Early life ==
Born in Wauchope, New South Wales, Everingham was educated at Fort Street High School and graduated with a Bachelor of Medicine and Surgery from the University of Sydney in 1946 and worked in public and private hospitals and as a family doctor. He spent time working in New South Wales psychiatric hospitals before relocating back to Rockhampton, Queensland where he had done his internship.

== Politics ==
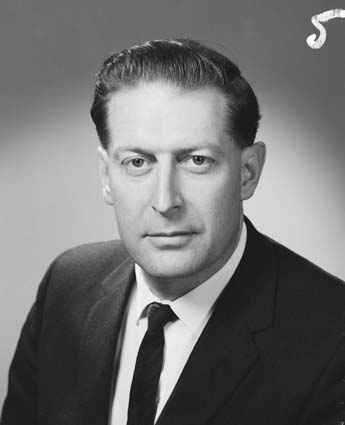
Everingham in 1968

Everingham's first attempt at entering politics came in 1963 when he unsuccessfully ran as the Australian Labor Party candidate in the seat of Dawson but was defeated by the Country Party's George Shaw.

Following the death of Member for Capricornia George Gray, Everingham nominated for pre-selection for the resulting 1967 by-election. Everingham won pre-selection, beating out local Rockhampton Labor identity Evan Schwarten (father of Robert Schwarten) at a time when Labor leader Gough Whitlam was seeking more tertiary-educated Labor MPs amongst the party's traditional working class members.

Everingham went on to win the 1967 by-election beating his nearest rival, the Liberal candidate Frank Rudd, and was subsequently elected as Member for Capricornia serving on the opposition. After Labor was returned to power at the 1972 federal election, Gough Whitlam appointed Everingham as Minister for Health.

Everingham was one of many Queensland Labor MPs to lose their seats at the 1975 election held after the dismissal of the Whitlam government, defeated by the National Country Party's Colin Carige. However, Everingham was re-elected when he was victorious against Carige at the 1977 federal election. He remained the Member for Capricornia until his retirement at the 1984 election.

=== Political views ===
Everingham was known for his fierce campaigning against cigarettes, alcohol, drugs and the sport of boxing. Local Rockhampton Labor identity, Barry Large (former Member for Capricornia Kirsten Livermore's long-serving political advisor), recalled that Everingham placed anti-smoking stickers on cigarette vending machines throughout Parliament House in Canberra due to his anti-tobacco stance.

Everingham was a proponent of the proposed SR1 set of spelling reforms, which resulted in him referring to his department the "Department of Helth" and dubbed himself as "Minister for Helth". This prompted Prime Minister Whitlam to send correspondence to Everingham beginning with "Dear Dug" and signed "Yurs Gof".

In the late 1960s, Everingham attracted attention for his support of government-funded sterilisation as a form of population control. In 1969 he made controversial comments advocating for sterilisation to be employed on Aboriginal Australians living in Woorabinda, Queensland, which had one of the highest infant death rates in Australia. Everingham rejected claims that his comments were racially discriminatory and stated that he supported "making sterilisation free for culturally deprived people, as it is freely available to rich people". Indigenous rights activist Faith Bandler stated that Everingham's comments had been taken out of context.

== Later life ==
Everingham was the coordinator of the World Election Commission in the World Government of World Citizens. He was appointed by the World Coordinator Garry Davis.

At the time of his death in late August 2017, Everingham was one of four remaining original Whitlam government ministers.

His death prompted a number of tributes including from long-serving state Labor MP Robert Schwarten who described Everingham as the "father of Medicare" due to his campaign for Australia to have a universal health care system. Schwarten described Everingham as being "instrumental" in establishing Medicare which was originally known as Medibank.

== Personal life ==
Everingham was married twice, his two wives having pre-deceased him. Everingham had two daughters, Jo-Anne and Sue; and two sons, Stephen and Rick.

Everingham's son Stephen was killed at the age of 22 in a car accident in June 1973. Stephen's 19-year-old passenger was also killed in the accident. The car collided head-on with a truck on the Warrego Highway near Laidley west of Brisbane, while Stephen and his passenger were returning to the Queensland Agricultural College at Lawes where they were both students.

At the time of his death, Doug Everingham had seven grandchildren, one great-grandchild, two step-grandchildren, and three step-grandchildren.

Political offices
Preceded by Ken Anderson	Minister for Health; 1972–1975	Succeeded by Don Chipp
Parliament of Australia
Preceded by George Gray	Member for Capricornia; 1967–1975	Succeeded by Colin Carige
Preceded by Colin Carige	Member for Capricornia; 1977–1984	Succeeded by Keith Wright
