= George Gray (Australian politician, born 1903) =

Australian politician

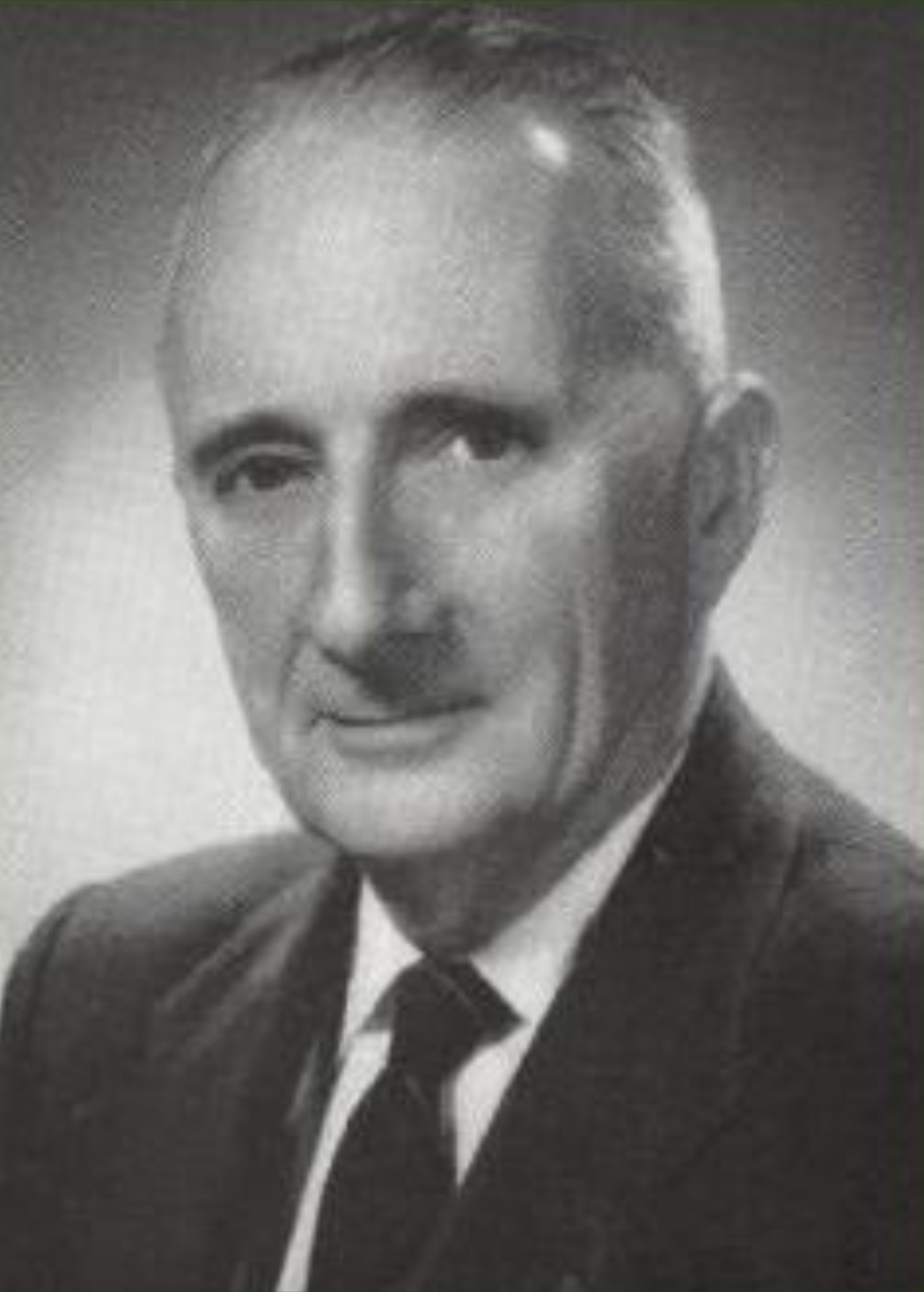

Member of the Australian Parliament for Capricornia
- In office 9 December 1961 – 2 August 1967
- Preceded by: George Pearce
- Succeeded by: Doug Everingham

Personal details
- Born: George Henry Gray; 2 October 1903 Hay, New South Wales
- Died: 2 August 1967 (aged 63) Rockhampton, Queensland
- Party: Douglas Credit (1930s); Labor (from ?)
- Spouse: Elsa Noelen Braham Stratton
- Occupation: Farmer

George Henry Gray (2 October 1903 – 2 August 1967) was an Australian politician. He was a member of the House of Representatives from 1961 until his death in 1967, representing the Queensland seat of Capricornia for the Australian Labor Party (ALP).

== Early life ==
Gray claimed to have been born at Hay, New South Wales on 2 October 1903 to bank manager George Henry Gray and his wife Priscilla Maud Kerr. He grew up near Orange and was educated at Burwood Public School in Sydney, then becoming a grocer's assistant at Thornleigh. He later became a customs officer at Shanghai in China in the mid-1920s.

Gray returned to Australia around 1926 and moved to Queensland, becoming a farmer and organiser for the Douglas Credit Party. He contested the 1935 state election for the party, and polled 46.5 percent in the seat of Albert, losing to Tom Plunkett of the CPNP. On 4 August 1939 he was the leader of a raid comprising thirty-seven members of the League for Social Justice on Parliament House in the Queensland capital of Brisbane. The raiders demanded lower unemployment and better conditions for primary producers from the government. Gray and the others were arrested for unlawful assembly but were acquitted at the subsequent trial. Later, he claimed to have been spying on the league for intelligence authorities.

== Military service ==
Gray was mobilised on 29 May 1940 and served in Queensland and Papua New Guinea. In May 1942 he was commissioned in the Australian Imperial Force, and on 12 December 1944 he transferred to the Reserve of Officers as a captain. Returning to Brisbane, he became an accountant for Queensland Cement & Lime Co. and owned a business (run by his wife Elsa) at Bowen Hills.

== Return from the military ==
In 1946, the Gray moved to Toowoomba, where he managed Co-operative Sales and Service Co. and joined the Australian Labor Party. Having formed the Roseneath Pastoral Company in 1950 with two associates, he began dairy farming near Laidley. Unfortunate weather and a fire in May 1951 that burnt Gray's house down compromised the venture. In 1955 he became secretary of the Rockhampton Agricultural Society.

== Federal politics ==
In 1961, Gray was elected to the Australian House of Representatives as the Labor member for Capricornia. He defeated Liberal incumbent George Pearce on a swing of over 10 percent. He actually came within a few hundred votes of taking the seat on the first count. His victory was part of a 15-seat swing to Labor that nearly toppled the government of Robert Menzies.

In parliament he was chiefly concerned with northern development and defence. He designed a combined tank and tank-carrier for the army, which received serious consideration.

== Personal life ==
On 20 April 1944 he married Elsa Noelen Braham Stratton, aged 19, at Woollahra in Sydney.

Gray was an elder of the John Knox Presbyterian Church in Rockhampton, and was a teetotaller.

On 2 August 1967 he died of pulmonary oedema at Rockhampton and was buried in the North Rockhampton cemetery; he was survived by his wife, three sons, and three daughters.

His wife Elsa ("Bray") Gray OAM was an alderman with Rockhampton City Council (1973–91) and was State secretary of the Australian Local Government Women's Association for eight years. She died in 2017.

Parliament of Australia
Preceded by George Pearce	Member for Capricornia; 1961 – 1967	Succeeded by Doug Everingham
