= 1955 Australian House of Representatives election =

This is a list of electoral division results for the Australian 1955 federal election.

== Overall ==
This section is an excerpt from 1955 Australian federal election § House of Representatives

Labor: 47 seats Liberal: 56 seats Country: 18 seats

House of Reps (IRV) — 1955–58—Turnout 95.00% (CV) — Informal 2.88%
| Party | Votes | % | Swing | Seats | Change |
|---|---|---|---|---|---|
| Liberal–Country coalition | 2,093,430 | 47.67 | +0.10 | 75 | +11 |
| Liberal | 1,745,985 | 39.75 | +0.75 | 57 | +10 |
| Country | 347,445 | 7.91 | –0.66 | 18 | +1 |
| Labor | 1,961,359 | 44.65 | –5.42 | 49 (Note: Including Northern Territory and Australian Capital Territory) | –10 |
| Anti-Communist Labor | 227,083 | 5.17 | +5.17 | 0 | 0 |
| Communist | 51,001 | 1.16 | –0.09 | 0 | 0 |
| Independents | 60,042 | 1.37 | +0.26 | 0 | 0 |
| Total | 4,392,915 | | | 122 | +1 |
Two-party-preferred (estimated)
| Liberal–Country coalition | Win | 54.20 | +4.90 | 75 | +11 |
| Labor | | 45.80 | −4.90 | 49 | −10 |

- Ten members were elected unopposed – five Liberal and five Country. This would be the last federal election where any seat attracted only one candidate.

Popular vote
| Labor | 44.65% |
| Liberal | 39.75% |
| Country | 7.91% |
| ALP AC | 5.17% |
| Independent | 1.37% |
| Communist | 1.16% |

Two-party-preferred vote
| Coalition | 54.20% |
| Labor | 45.80% |

Parliament seats
| Coalition | 61.48% |
| Labor | 38.52% |

== New South Wales ==
1955 Australian federal election (New South Wales)
| ← 1954 | 10 December 1955 | 1958 → |

All 46 NSW seats in the House of Representatives 23 seats needed for a majority
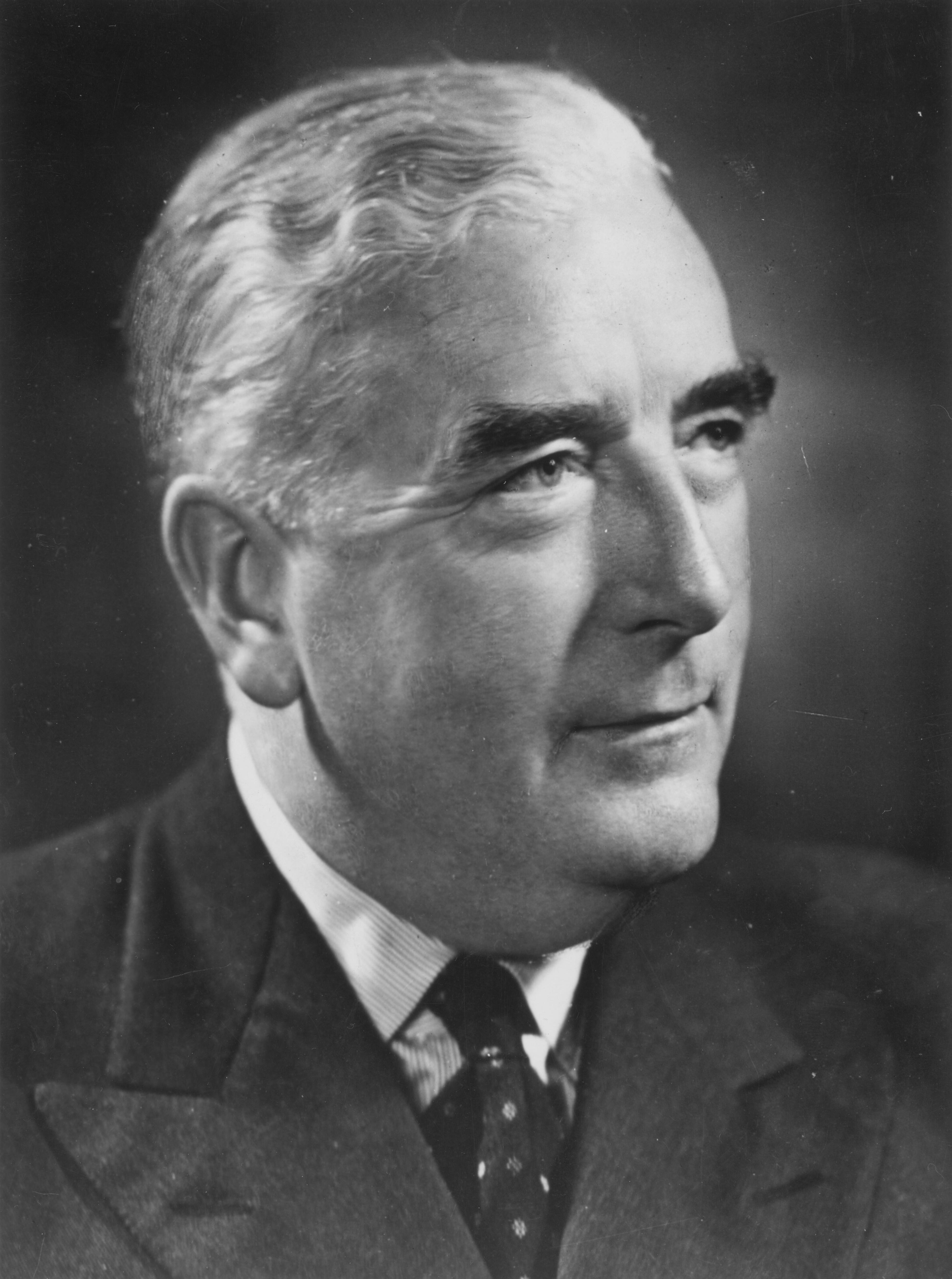

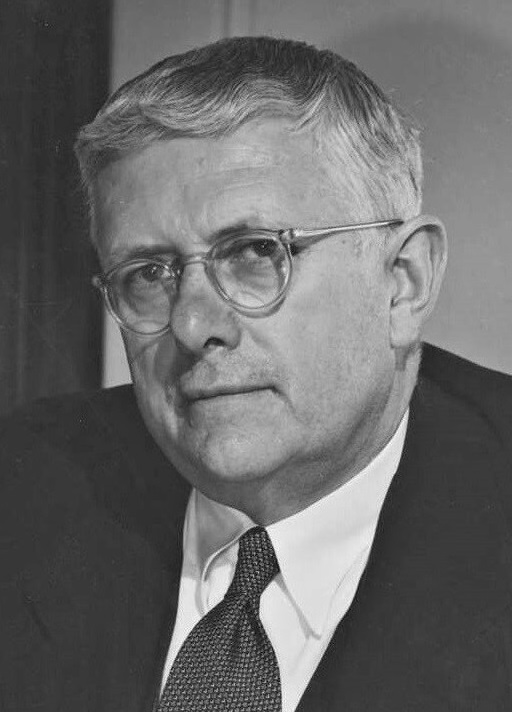
| | First party | Second party |
|---|---|---|
| Leader | Robert Menzies | H. V. Evatt |
| Party | Coalition | Labor |
| Seats before | 22 | 25 |
| Seats won | 25 | 21 |
| Seat change | ▲3 | ▼4 |
| Popular vote | 797,234 | 836,682 |
| Percentage | 47.3% | 49.6% |
| Swing | ▲3.2pp | ▼2.8pp |
| TPP | 50.5% | 49.5% |
| TPP swing | ▲3.5pp | ▼3.5pp |

=== Banks ===
This section is an excerpt from Electoral results for the Division of Banks § 1955

1955 Australian federal election: Banks
| Party | Candidate | Votes | % | ±% |
|---|---|---|---|---|
| Labor | Eric Costa | 23,431 | 56.0 | −4.1 |
| Liberal | Harold Stalker | 15,088 | 36.0 | +2.1 |
| Communist | Pat Clancy | 3,356 | 8.0 | +2.5 |
| Total formal votes | | 41,875 | 96.8 | |
| Informal votes | | 1,386 | 3.2 | |
| Turnout | | 43,261 | 96.4 | |
Two-party-preferred result
| Labor | Eric Costa | | 63.5 | −1.8 |
| Liberal | Harold Stalker | | 36.5 | +1.8 |
| Labor hold | | Swing | −7.9 | |

=== Barton ===
This section is an excerpt from Electoral results for the Division of Barton § 1955

1955 Australian federal election: Barton
| Party | Candidate | Votes | % | ±% |
|---|---|---|---|---|
| Labor | Herbert Evatt | 20,896 | 49.2 | −4.4 |
| Liberal | Bill Arthur | 19,903 | 46.9 | +0.5 |
| Independent | Eric Trembath | 1,655 | 3.9 | +3.9 |
| Total formal votes | | 42,454 | 98.2 | |
| Informal votes | | 796 | 1.8 | |
| Turnout | | 43,250 | 96.6 | |
Two-party-preferred result
| Labor | Herbert Evatt | 21,340 | 50.3 | −3.3 |
| Liberal | Bill Arthur | 21,114 | 49.7 | +3.3 |
| Labor hold | | Swing | −3.3 | |

=== Bennelong ===
This section is an excerpt from Electoral results for the Division of Bennelong § 1955

1955 Australian federal election: Bennelong
| Party | Candidate | Votes | % | ±% |
|---|---|---|---|---|
| Liberal | John Cramer | 25,628 | 60.7 | +3.8 |
| Labor | Harold Coates | 16,607 | 39.3 | −3.8 |
| Total formal votes | | 42,235 | 97.3 | |
| Informal votes | | 1,160 | 2.7 | |
| Turnout | | 43,395 | 95.8 | |
| Liberal hold | | Swing | +3.8 | |

=== Blaxland ===
This section is an excerpt from Electoral results for the Division of Blaxland § 1955

1955 Australian federal election: Blaxland
| Party | Candidate | Votes | % | ±% |
|---|---|---|---|---|
| Labor | Jim Harrison | 25,577 | 62.5 | −0.6 |
| Liberal | Reginald Allsop | 15,371 | 37.5 | +5.5 |
| Total formal votes | | 40,948 | 96.6 | |
| Informal votes | | 1,429 | 3.4 | |
| Turnout | | 42,377 | 95.0 | |
| Labor hold | | Swing | −5.0 | |

=== Bradfield ===
This section is an excerpt from Electoral results for the Division of Bradfield § 1955

1955 Australian federal election: Bradfield
| Party | Candidate | Votes | % | ±% |
|---|---|---|---|---|
| Liberal | Harry Turner | unopposed | | |
| Liberal hold | | Swing | | |

=== Calare ===
This section is an excerpt from Electoral results for the Division of Calare § 1955

1955 Australian federal election: Calare
| Party | Candidate | Votes | % | ±% |
|---|---|---|---|---|
| Liberal | John Howse | 23,956 | 61.2 | +5.9 |
| Labor | Lionel Wood | 15,189 | 38.8 | −4.7 |
| Total formal votes | | 39,145 | 98.0 | |
| Informal votes | | 797 | 2.0 | |
| Turnout | | 39,942 | 95.8 | |
| Liberal hold | | Swing | +5.3 | |

=== Cowper ===
This section is an excerpt from Electoral results for the Division of Cowper § 1955

1955 Australian federal election: Cowper
| Party | Candidate | Votes | % | ±% |
|---|---|---|---|---|
| Country | Sir Earle Page | unopposed | | |
| Country hold | | Swing | | |

=== Cunningham ===
This section is an excerpt from Electoral results for the Division of Cunningham § 1955

1955 Australian federal election: Cunningham
| Party | Candidate | Votes | % | ±% |
|---|---|---|---|---|
| Labor | Billy Davies | 25,180 | 62.2 | +0.7 |
| Liberal | John Parkinson | 13,370 | 33.0 | +0.8 |
| Communist | William Harkness | 1,931 | 4.8 | −1.5 |
| Total formal votes | | 40,481 | 97.2 | |
| Informal votes | | 1,172 | 2.8 | |
| Turnout | | 41,653 | 95.2 | |
Two-party-preferred result
| Labor | Billy Davies | | 66.5 | +0.6 |
| Liberal | John Parkinson | | 33.5 | −0.6 |
| Labor hold | | Swing | +0.6 | |

=== Dalley ===
This section is an excerpt from Electoral results for the Division of Dalley § 1955

1955 Australian federal election: Dalley
| Party | Candidate | Votes | % | ±% |
|---|---|---|---|---|
| Labor | William O'Connor | 28,913 | 71.9 | +0.2 |
| Liberal | Stanley Tyler | 8,933 | 22.2 | −0.9 |
| Communist | Ernie Thornton | 2,377 | 5.9 | +0.8 |
| Total formal votes | | 40,223 | 96.4 | |
| Informal votes | | 1,482 | 3.6 | |
| Turnout | | 41,705 | 94.5 | |
Two-party-preferred result
| Labor | William O'Connor | | 77.2 | +0.9 |
| Liberal | Stanley Tyler | | 22.8 | −0.9 |
| Labor hold | | Swing | +0.9 | |

=== Darling ===
This section is an excerpt from Electoral results for the Division of Darling § 1955

1955 Australian federal election: Darling
| Party | Candidate | Votes | % | ±% |
|---|---|---|---|---|
| Labor | Joe Clark | 23,428 | 67.5 | −3.2 |
| Country | Ewen Martin | 11,282 | 32.5 | +3.2 |
| Total formal votes | | 34,710 | 97.2 | |
| Informal votes | | 1,005 | 2.8 | |
| Turnout | | 35,715 | 93.1 | |
| Labor hold | | Swing | −3.2 | |

=== East Sydney ===
This section is an excerpt from Electoral results for the Division of East Sydney § 1955

1955 Australian federal election: East Sydney
| Party | Candidate | Votes | % | ±% |
|---|---|---|---|---|
| Labor | Eddie Ward | 24,859 | 63.6 | −3.4 |
| Liberal | Joseph Landor | 10,953 | 28.0 | −0.4 |
| Communist | Bill Brown | 3,251 | 8.3 | +3.7 |
| Total formal votes | | 39,063 | 96.0 | |
| Informal votes | | 1,642 | 4.0 | |
| Turnout | | 40,705 | 92.2 | |
Two-party-preferred result
| Labor | Eddie Ward | | 70.2 | −0.9 |
| Liberal | Joseph Landor | | 29.8 | +0.9 |
| Labor hold | | Swing | −0.9 | |

=== Eden-Monaro ===
This section is an excerpt from Electoral results for the Division of Eden-Monaro § 1955

1955 Australian federal election: Eden-Monaro
| Party | Candidate | Votes | % | ±% |
|---|---|---|---|---|
| Labor | Allan Fraser | 21,007 | 52.9 | +0.9 |
| Liberal | Mark Flanagan | 16,609 | 41.9 | −6.2 |
| Independent | Royce Beavis | 2,113 | 5.3 | +5.3 |
| Total formal votes | | 39,729 | 98.5 | |
| Informal votes | | 611 | 1.5 | |
| Turnout | | 40,340 | 96.0 | |
Two-party-preferred result
| Labor | Allan Fraser | | 55.1 | +3.1 |
| Liberal | Mark Flanagan | | 44.9 | −3.1 |
| Labor hold | | Swing | +3.1 | |

=== Evans ===
This section is an excerpt from Electoral results for the Division of Evans § 1955

1955 Australian federal election: Evans
| Party | Candidate | Votes | % | ±% |
|---|---|---|---|---|
| Liberal | Frederick Osborne | 25,236 | 60.9 | +7.6 |
| Labor | Sidney Pollard | 16,179 | 39.1 | −7.6 |
| Total formal votes | | 41,415 | 97.1 | |
| Informal votes | | 1,228 | 2.9 | |
| Turnout | | 42,643 | 95.7 | |
| Liberal hold | | Swing | +7.6 | |

=== Farrer ===
This section is an excerpt from Electoral results for the Division of Farrer § 1955

1955 Australian federal election: Farrer
| Party | Candidate | Votes | % | ±% |
|---|---|---|---|---|
| Liberal | David Fairbairn | 25,805 | 65.9 | +8.8 |
| Labor | Robert Garland | 13,361 | 34.1 | −8.8 |
| Total formal votes | | 39,166 | 97.9 | |
| Informal votes | | 855 | 2.1 | |
| Turnout | | 40,021 | 95.6 | |
| Liberal hold | | Swing | +8.8 | |

=== Grayndler ===
This section is an excerpt from Electoral results for the Division of Grayndler § 1955

1955 Australian federal election: Grayndler
| Party | Candidate | Votes | % | ±% |
|---|---|---|---|---|
| Labor | Fred Daly | 24,151 | 60.1 | −8.8 |
| Liberal | Ian Chisholm | 12,258 | 30.5 | +0.9 |
| Communist | Hal Alexander | 3,218 | 8.0 | +8.0 |
| Independent | William McCristal | 586 | 1.5 | −0.5 |
| Total formal votes | | 40,213 | 95.8 | |
| Informal votes | | 1,748 | 4.2 | |
| Turnout | | 41,961 | 94.7 | |
Two-party-preferred result
| Labor | Fred Daly | | 67.3 | −2.6 |
| Liberal | Ian Chisholm | | 32.7 | +2.6 |
| Labor hold | | Swing | −2.6 | |

=== Gwydir ===
This section is an excerpt from Electoral results for the Division of Gwydir § 1955

1955 Australian federal election: Gwydir
| Party | Candidate | Votes | % | ±% |
|---|---|---|---|---|
| Country | Ian Allan | 22,271 | 57.9 | +5.0 |
| Labor | Austin Heffernan | 16,162 | 42.1 | −5.0 |
| Total formal votes | | 38,433 | 98.2 | |
| Informal votes | | 700 | 1.8 | |
| Turnout | | 39,133 | 94.9 | |
| Country hold | | Swing | +5.0 | |

=== Hughes ===
This section is an excerpt from Electoral results for the Division of Hughes § 1955

1955 Australian federal election: Hughes
| Party | Candidate | Votes | % | ±% |
|---|---|---|---|---|
| Labor | Les Johnson | 20,549 | 48.4 | −7.0 |
| Liberal | Keith Bates | 19,840 | 46.7 | +6.3 |
| Communist | Alf Watt | 1,201 | 2.8 | +2.8 |
| Independent | Robert Mackie | 880 | 2.1 | +2.1 |
| Total formal votes | | 42,470 | 96.7 | |
| Informal votes | | 1,437 | 3.3 | |
| Turnout | | 43,907 | 95.7 | |
Two-party-preferred result
| Labor | Les Johnson | 22,165 | 52.2 | −5.2 |
| Liberal | Keith Bates | 20,305 | 47.8 | +5.2 |
| Labor notional hold | | Swing | −5.2 | |

=== Hume ===
This section is an excerpt from Electoral results for the Division of Hume § 1955

1955 Australian federal election: Hume
| Party | Candidate | Votes | % | ±% |
|---|---|---|---|---|
| Country | Charles Anderson | 20,494 | 52.2 | +19.8 |
| Labor | Arthur Fuller | 18,779 | 47.8 | −2.7 |
| Total formal votes | | 39,273 | 98.4 | |
| Informal votes | | 651 | 1.6 | |
| Turnout | | 39,924 | 96.4 | |
| Country gain from Labor | | Swing | +3.5 | |

=== Hunter ===
This section is an excerpt from Electoral results for the Division of Hunter § 1955

1955 Australian federal election: Hunter
| Party | Candidate | Votes | % | ±% |
|---|---|---|---|---|
| Labor | Rowley James | 28,766 | 70.8 | +2.0 |
| Liberal | Edward Farrell | 8,604 | 21.3 | +1.1 |
| Communist | Evan Phillips | 3,158 | 7.8 | +2.6 |
| Total formal votes | | 40,328 | 97.4 | |
| Informal votes | | 1,071 | 2.6 | |
| Turnout | | 41,399 | 95.9 | |
Two-party-preferred result
| Labor | Rowley James | | 77.8 | +1.3 |
| Liberal | Edward Farrell | | 32.2 | −1.3 |
| Labor hold | | Swing | +1.3 | |

=== Kingsford Smith ===
This section is an excerpt from Electoral results for the Division of Kingsford Smith § 1955

1955 Australian federal election: Kingsford-Smith
| Party | Candidate | Votes | % | ±% |
|---|---|---|---|---|
| Labor | Dan Curtin | 21,647 | 52.7 | −5.6 |
| Liberal | John McGirr | 17,546 | 42.8 | +1.1 |
| Independent | Hubert O'Connell | 1,850 | 4.5 | +4.5 |
| Total formal votes | | 41,043 | 96.9 | |
| Informal votes | | 1,304 | 3.1 | |
| Turnout | | 42,347 | 95.1 | |
Two-party-preferred result
| Labor | Dan Curtin | | 55.0 | −3.3 |
| Liberal | John McGirr | | 45.0 | +3.3 |
| Labor hold | | Swing | −3.3 | |

=== Lang ===
This section is an excerpt from Electoral results for the Division of Lang § 1955

1955 Australian federal election: Lang
| Party | Candidate | Votes | % | ±% |
|---|---|---|---|---|
| Labor | Frank Stewart | 25,175 | 60.3 | −2.8 |
| Liberal | Wallace Peacock | 16,550 | 39.7 | +5.9 |
| Total formal votes | | 41,725 | 96.9 | |
| Informal votes | | 1,341 | 3.1 | |
| Turnout | | 43,066 | 95.5 | |
| Labor hold | | Swing | −5.5 | |

=== Lawson ===
This section is an excerpt from Electoral results for the Division of Lawson § 1955

1955 Australian federal election: Lawson
| Party | Candidate | Votes | % | ±% |
|---|---|---|---|---|
| Country | Laurie Failes | 22,030 | 56.7 | +7.1 |
| Labor | Jack Williamson | 16,845 | 43.3 | −7.1 |
| Total formal votes | | 38,875 | 98.1 | |
| Informal votes | | 745 | 1.9 | |
| Turnout | | 39,620 | 95.7 | |
| Country gain from Labor | | Swing | +7.1 | |

=== Lowe ===
This section is an excerpt from Electoral results for the Division of Lowe § 1955

1955 Australian federal election: Lowe
| Party | Candidate | Votes | % | ±% |
|---|---|---|---|---|
| Liberal | William McMahon | 25,080 | 60.3 | +3.8 |
| Labor | Edward Davies | 16,508 | 39.7 | −3.8 |
| Total formal votes | | 41,588 | 97.2 | |
| Informal votes | | 1,219 | 2.8 | |
| Turnout | | 42,807 | 96.0 | |
| Liberal hold | | Swing | +3.8 | |

=== Lyne ===
This section is an excerpt from Electoral results for the Division of Lyne § 1955

1955 Australian federal election: Lyne
| Party | Candidate | Votes | % | ±% |
|---|---|---|---|---|
| Country | Philip Lucock | 23,477 | 59.8 | +7.7 |
| Labor | Jack Collins | 14,198 | 36.2 | +36.2 |
| Independent | Joe Cordner | 1,555 | 4.0 | −1.1 |
| Total formal votes | | 39,230 | 98.1 | |
| Informal votes | | 777 | 1.9 | |
| Turnout | | 40,007 | 96.2 | |
Two-party-preferred result
| Country | Philip Lucock | | 61.8 | +7.5 |
| Labor | Jack Collins | | 38.2 | +38.2 |
| Country hold | | Swing | +7.5 | |

=== Macarthur ===
This section is an excerpt from Electoral results for the Division of Macarthur § 1955

1955 Australian federal election: Macarthur
| Party | Candidate | Votes | % | ±% |
|---|---|---|---|---|
| Liberal | Jeff Bate | 23,127 | 58.0 | +2.6 |
| Labor | Claude Allen | 16,756 | 42.0 | −2.0 |
| Total formal votes | | 39,883 | 97.4 | |
| Informal votes | | 1,021 | 2.6 | |
| Turnout | | 40,904 | 95.1 | |
| Liberal hold | | Swing | +2.4 | |

=== Mackellar ===
This section is an excerpt from Electoral results for the Division of Mackellar § 1955

1955 Australian federal election: Mackellar
| Party | Candidate | Votes | % | ±% |
|---|---|---|---|---|
| Liberal | Bill Wentworth | 25,553 | 62.1 | +2.6 |
| Labor | Norman McAlpine | 12,525 | 30.4 | −5.6 |
| Communist | Frank Hardy | 3,087 | 7.5 | +3.1 |
| Total formal votes | | 41,165 | 97.0 | |
| Informal votes | | 1,255 | 3.0 | |
| Turnout | | 42,420 | 95.2 | |
Two-party-preferred result
| Liberal | Bill Wentworth | | 62.9 | +1.3 |
| Labor | Norman McAlpine | | 37.1 | −1.3 |
| Liberal hold | | Swing | +1.3 | |

=== Macquarie ===
This section is an excerpt from Electoral results for the Division of Macquarie § 1955

1955 Australian federal election: Macquarie
| Party | Candidate | Votes | % | ±% |
|---|---|---|---|---|
| Labor | Tony Luchetti | 22,461 | 55.9 | −1.0 |
| Liberal | Norman Leven | 16,662 | 41.4 | +1.1 |
| Communist | Vernon Moffitt | 1,075 | 2.7 | −0.1 |
| Total formal votes | | 40,198 | 98.0 | |
| Informal votes | | 828 | 2.0 | |
| Turnout | | 41,026 | 95.8 | |
Two-party-preferred result
| Labor | Tony Luchetti | | 58.3 | −1.2 |
| Liberal | Norman Leven | | 41.7 | +1.2 |
| Labor hold | | Swing | −1.2 | |

=== Mitchell ===
This section is an excerpt from Electoral results for the Division of Mitchell § 1955

1955 Australian federal election: Mitchell
| Party | Candidate | Votes | % | ±% |
|---|---|---|---|---|
| Liberal | Roy Wheeler | 24,077 | 59.7 | +3.8 |
| Labor | Doug Bowd | 16,239 | 40.3 | −3.8 |
| Total formal votes | | 40,316 | 97.6 | |
| Informal votes | | 971 | 2.4 | |
| Turnout | | 41,287 | 93.8 | |
| Liberal hold | | Swing | +3.8 | |

=== New England ===
This section is an excerpt from Electoral results for the Division of New England § 1955

1955 Australian federal election: New England
| Party | Candidate | Votes | % | ±% |
|---|---|---|---|---|
| Country | David Drummond | 23,666 | 60.4 | +2.1 |
| Labor | Frederick Cowley | 15,511 | 39.6 | −2.1 |
| Total formal votes | | 39,177 | 98.1 | |
| Informal votes | | 777 | 1.9 | |
| Turnout | | 39,954 | 96.0 | |
| Country hold | | Swing | +2.1 | |

=== Newcastle ===
This section is an excerpt from Electoral results for the Division of Newcastle1955

1955 Australian federal election: Newcastle
| Party | Candidate | Votes | % | ±% |
|---|---|---|---|---|
| Labor | David Watkins | 23,801 | 59.2 | −1.0 |
| Liberal | Eric Cupit | 15,017 | 37.3 | +1.5 |
| Communist | Doug Olive | 879 | 2.2 | +0.9 |
| Independent | Sidney Monroe | 522 | 1.3 | −0.1 |
| Total formal votes | | 40,219 | 96.5 | |
| Informal votes | | 1,479 | 3.5 | |
| Turnout | | 41,698 | 95.9 | |
Two-party-preferred result
| Labor | David Watkins | | 61.8 | +0.0 |
| Liberal | Eric Cupit | | 38.2 | +0.0 |
| Labor hold | | Swing | +0.0 | |

=== North Sydney ===
This section is an excerpt from Electoral results for the Division of North Sydney § 1955

1955 Australian federal election: North Sydney
| Party | Candidate | Votes | % | ±% |
|---|---|---|---|---|
| Liberal | William Jack | 25,359 | 62.3 | +8.4 |
| Labor | Joseph McNally | 15,322 | 37.7 | −8.4 |
| Total formal votes | | 40,681 | 97.2 | |
| Informal votes | | 1,179 | 2.8 | |
| Turnout | | 41,860 | 95.1 | +8.4 |
| Liberal hold | | Swing | +8.4 | |

=== Parkes ===
This section is an excerpt from Electoral results for the Division of Parkes (1901–1969) § 1955

1955 Australian federal election: Parkes
| Party | Candidate | Votes | % | ±% |
|---|---|---|---|---|
| Labor | Les Haylen | 20,895 | 50.7 | −2.0 |
| Liberal | John Spicer | 20,295 | 49.3 | +2.0 |
| Total formal votes | | 41,190 | 97.0 | |
| Informal votes | | 1,269 | 3.0 | |
| Turnout | | 42,459 | 95.6 | |
| Labor hold | | Swing | −2.0 | |

=== Parramatta ===
This section is an excerpt from Electoral results for the Division of Parramatta § 1955

1955 Australian federal election: Parramatta
| Party | Candidate | Votes | % | ±% |
|---|---|---|---|---|
| Liberal | Howard Beale | 25,854 | 62.3 | +1.6 |
| Labor | John Heazlewood | 15,631 | 37.7 | −1.6 |
| Total formal votes | | 41,485 | 97.3 | |
| Informal votes | | 1,137 | 2.7 | |
| Turnout | | 42,622 | 95.8 | |
| Liberal hold | | Swing | +1.6 | |

=== Paterson ===
This section is an excerpt from Electoral results for the Division of Paterson § 1955

1955 Australian federal election: Paterson
| Party | Candidate | Votes | % | ±% |
|---|---|---|---|---|
| Liberal | Allen Fairhall | 23,623 | 60.2 | +6.9 |
| Labor | William Harvey | 15,601 | 39.8 | −6.4 |
| Total formal votes | | 39,224 | 98.0 | |
| Informal votes | | 800 | 2.0 | |
| Turnout | | 40,024 | 96.8 | |
| Liberal hold | | Swing | +6.7 | |

=== Phillip ===
This section is an excerpt from Electoral results for the Division of Phillip § 1955

1955 Australian federal election: Phillip
| Party | Candidate | Votes | % | ±% |
|---|---|---|---|---|
| Liberal | William Aston | 21,142 | 51.1 | +5.7 |
| Labor | Joe Fitzgerald | 20,225 | 48.9 | −5.7 |
| Total formal votes | | 41,367 | 97.1 | |
| Informal votes | | 1,228 | 2.9 | |
| Turnout | | 42,595 | 94.8 | |
| Liberal gain from Labor | | Swing | +5.7 | |

=== Reid ===
This section is an excerpt from Electoral results for the Division of Reid § 1955

1955 Australian federal election: Reid
| Party | Candidate | Votes | % | ±% |
|---|---|---|---|---|
| Labor | Charles Morgan | 25,959 | 62.9 | −2.1 |
| Liberal | George Walker | 9,721 | 23.6 | −2.6 |
| Communist | Jack Hughes | 3,270 | 7.9 | +3.4 |
| Independent | Charles Tubman | 2,327 | 5.6 | +5.6 |
| Total formal votes | | 41,277 | 96.1 | |
| Informal votes | | 1,673 | 3.9 | |
| Turnout | | 42,950 | 95.1 | |
Two-party-preferred result
| Labor | Charles Morgan | | 72.9 | +1.7 |
| Liberal | George Walker | | 27.1 | −1.7 |
| Labor hold | | Swing | +1.7 | |

=== Richmond ===
This section is an excerpt from Electoral results for the Division of Richmond § 1955

1955 Australian federal election: Richmond
| Party | Candidate | Votes | % | ±% |
|---|---|---|---|---|
| Country | Larry Anthony | unopposed | | |
| Country hold | | Swing | | |

=== Riverina ===
This section is an excerpt from Electoral results for the Division of Riverina § 1955

1955 Australian federal election: Riverina
| Party | Candidate | Votes | % | ±% |
|---|---|---|---|---|
| Country | Hugh Roberton | 22,347 | 59.3 | +7.1 |
| Labor | Oscar Washington | 15,324 | 40.7 | −4.6 |
| Total formal votes | | 37,671 | 97.7 | |
| Informal votes | | 895 | 2.3 | |
| Turnout | | 38,566 | 94.3 | |
| Country hold | | Swing | +5.9 | |

=== Robertson ===
This section is an excerpt from Electoral results for the Division of Robertson § 1955

1955 Australian federal election: Robertson
| Party | Candidate | Votes | % | ±% |
|---|---|---|---|---|
| Liberal | Roger Dean | 22,660 | 57.7 | +3.9 |
| Labor | Frank Spencer | 16,586 | 42.3 | −2.2 |
| Total formal votes | | 39,246 | 97.3 | |
| Informal votes | | 1,075 | 2.7 | |
| Turnout | | 40,321 | 94.5 | |
| Liberal hold | | Swing | +3.1 | |

=== Shortland ===
This section is an excerpt from Electoral results for the Division of Shortland § 1955

1955 Australian federal election: Shortland
| Party | Candidate | Votes | % | ±% |
|---|---|---|---|---|
| Labor | Charles Griffiths | 26,066 | 63.2 | −3.8 |
| Liberal | Gordon Greig | 15,179 | 36.8 | +3.8 |
| Total formal votes | | 41,245 | 96.8 | |
| Informal votes | | 1,364 | 3.2 | |
| Turnout | | 42,609 | 96.0 | |
| Labor hold | | Swing | −3.8 | |

=== St George ===
This section is an excerpt from Electoral results for the Division of St George § 1955

1955 Australian federal election: St George
| Party | Candidate | Votes | % | ±% |
|---|---|---|---|---|
| Liberal | Bill Graham | 22,171 | 52.4 | +5.8 |
| Labor | Nelson Lemmon | 20,142 | 47.6 | −5.8 |
| Total formal votes | | 42,313 | 97.6 | |
| Informal votes | | 1,007 | 2.3 | |
| Turnout | | 43,320 | 96.7 | |
| Liberal gain from Labor | | Swing | +5.8 | |

=== Warringah ===
This section is an excerpt from Electoral results for the Division of Warringah § 1955

1955 Australian federal election: Warringah
| Party | Candidate | Votes | % | ±% |
|---|---|---|---|---|
| Liberal | Francis Bland | unopposed | | |
| Liberal hold | | Swing | | |

=== Watson ===
This section is an excerpt from Electoral results for the Division of Watson (1934–1969) § 1955

1955 Australian federal election: Watson
| Party | Candidate | Votes | % | ±% |
|---|---|---|---|---|
| Labor | Jim Cope | 30,129 | 74.4 | −3.8 |
| Liberal | Jill Huxtable | 8,316 | 20.5 | +2.1 |
| Communist | Harry Hatfield | 2,025 | 5.0 | +2.4 |
| Total formal votes | | 40,470 | 96.1 | |
| Informal votes | | 1,649 | 3.9 | |
| Turnout | | 42,119 | 95.4 | |
Two-party-preferred result
| Labor | Jim Cope | | 78.9 | −2.1 |
| Liberal | Jill Huxtable | | 21.1 | +2.1 |
| Labor hold | | Swing | −2.1 | |

=== Wentworth ===
This section is an excerpt from Electoral results for the Division of Wentworth § 1955

1955 Australian federal election: Wentworth
| Party | Candidate | Votes | % | ±% |
|---|---|---|---|---|
| Liberal | Sir Eric Harrison | 28,009 | 72.0 | −28.0 |
| Independent | Hal Lashwood | 10,896 | 28.0 | +28.0 |
| Total formal votes | | 38,905 | 96.8 | |
| Informal votes | | 1,283 | 3.2 | |
| Turnout | | 40,188 | 92.3 | |
| Liberal hold | | Swing | −28.0 | |

=== Werriwa ===
This section is an excerpt from Electoral results for the Division of Werriwa § 1955

1955 Australian federal election: Werriwa
| Party | Candidate | Votes | % | ±% |
|---|---|---|---|---|
| Labor | Gough Whitlam | 21,903 | 56.4 | −3.2 |
| Liberal | John Shannon | 16,921 | 43.6 | +6.6 |
| Total formal votes | | 38,824 | 95.9 | |
| Informal votes | | 1,647 | 4.1 | |
| Turnout | | 40,471 | 94.5 | |
| Labor hold | | Swing | −4.9 | |

=== West Sydney ===
This section is an excerpt from Electoral results for the Division of West Sydney § 1955

1955 Australian federal election: West Sydney
| Party | Candidate | Votes | % | ±% |
|---|---|---|---|---|
| Labor | Dan Minogue | 28,309 | 73.7 | −1.1 |
| Liberal | Frank Weaver | 7,751 | 20.2 | +1.1 |
| Communist | Lance Sharkey | 2,364 | 6.2 | +0.1 |
| Total formal votes | | 38,424 | 95.4 | |
| Informal votes | | 1,853 | 4.6 | |
| Turnout | | 40,277 | 92.4 | |
Two-party-preferred result
| Labor | Dan Minogue | | 79.3 | −1.0 |
| Liberal | Frank Waver | | 20.7 | +1.0 |
| Labor hold | | Swing | −1.0 | |

== Victoria ==
1955 Australian federal election (Victoria)
| ← 1954 | 10 December 1955 | 1958 → |

All 33 Victorian seats in the House of Representatives 17 seats needed for a majority
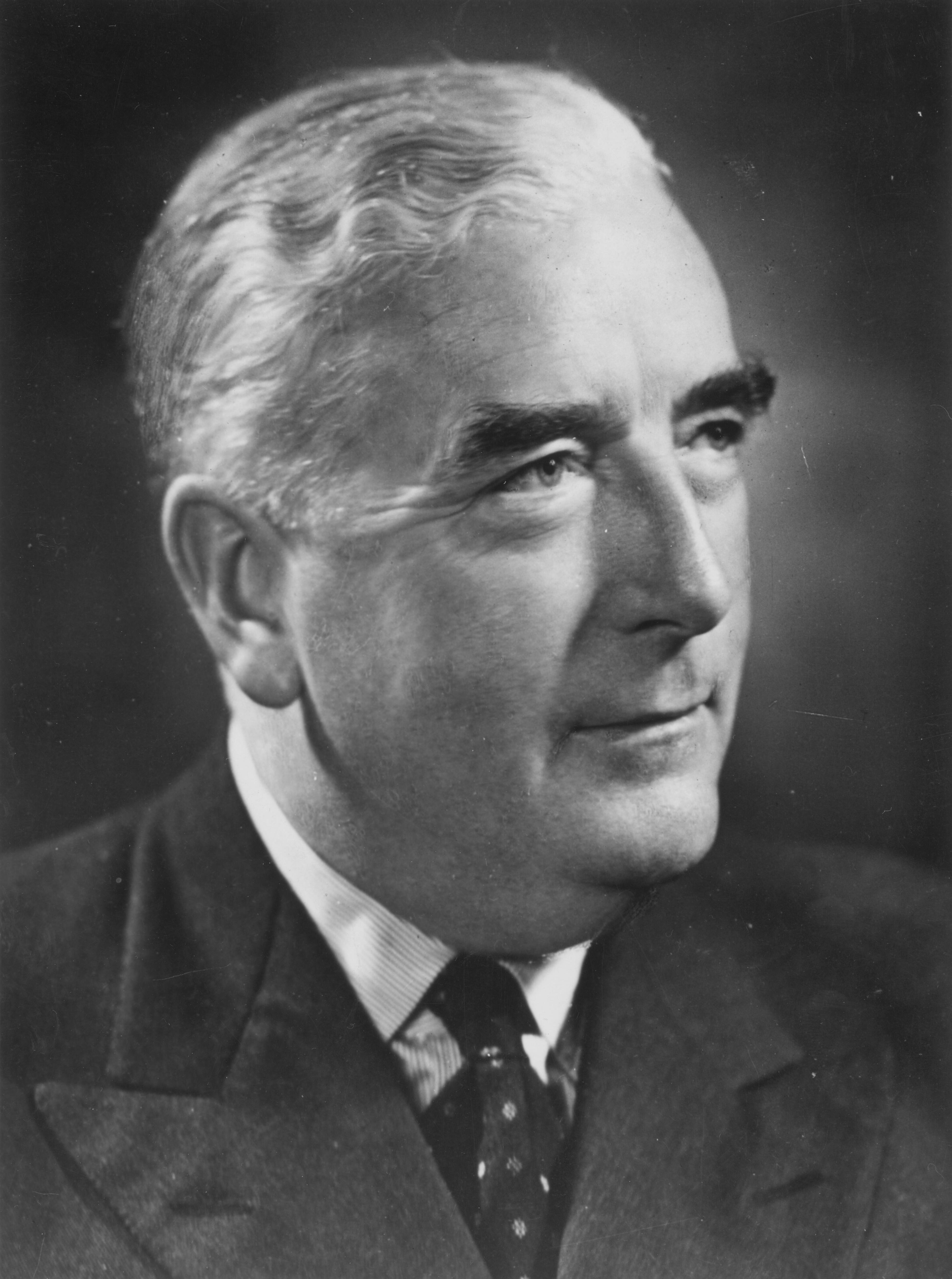

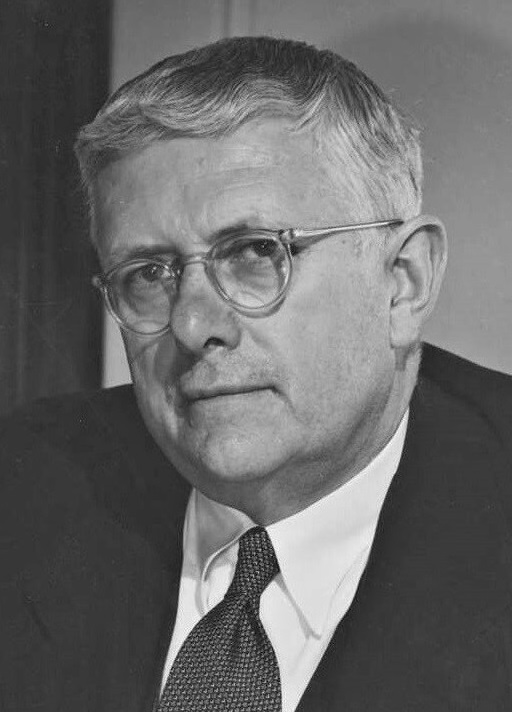
| | First party | Second party |
|---|---|---|
| Leader | Robert Menzies | H. V. Evatt |
| Party | Coalition | Labor |
| Seats before | 18 | 15 |
| Seats won | 23 | 10 |
| Seat change | ▲5 | ▼5 |
| Popular vote | 622,862 | 493,449 |
| Percentage | 46.9% | 37.2% |
| Swing | ▼1.7pp | ▼13.2pp |
| TPP | 59.2% | 40.8% |
| TPP swing | ▲9.9pp | ▼9.9pp |

=== Balaclava ===
This section is an excerpt from Electoral results for the Division of Balaclava § 1955

1955 Australian federal election: Balaclava
| Party | Candidate | Votes | % | ±% |
|---|---|---|---|---|
| Liberal | Percy Joske | 26,087 | 64.1 | +0.7 |
| Labor | George Smith | 9,780 | 24.0 | −12.6 |
| Labor (A-C) | Rex Keane | 4,816 | 11.8 | +11.8 |
| Total formal votes | | 40,683 | 97.8 | |
| Informal votes | | 896 | 2.2 | |
| Turnout | | 41,579 | 94.0 | |
Two-party-preferred result
| Liberal | Percy Joske | | 73.5 | +10.1 |
| Labor | George Smith | | 26.5 | −10.1 |
| Liberal hold | | Swing | +10.1 | |

=== Ballaarat ===
This section is an excerpt from Electoral results for the Division of Ballarat § 1955

1955 Australian federal election: Ballaarat
| Party | Candidate | Votes | % | ±% |
|---|---|---|---|---|
| Liberal | Dudley Erwin | 15,763 | 38.3 | −9.1 |
| Labor | Austin Dowling | 15,686 | 38.1 | −14.7 |
| Labor (A-C) | Bob Joshua | 9,757 | 23.7 | +23.7 |
| Total formal votes | | 41,206 | 98.4 | |
| Informal votes | | 682 | 1.6 | |
| Turnout | | 41,888 | 96.6 | |
Two-party-preferred result
| Liberal | Dudley Erwin | 23,852 | 57.9 | +10.7 |
| Labor | Austin Dowling | 17,354 | 42.1 | −10.7 |
| Liberal gain from Labor | | Swing | +10.7 | |

=== Batman ===
This section is an excerpt from Electoral results for the Division of Batman § 1955

1955 Australian federal election: Batman
| Party | Candidate | Votes | % | ±% |
|---|---|---|---|---|
| Labor | Alan Bird | 21,295 | 49.7 | −9.1 |
| Liberal | Fred Capp | 14,972 | 35.0 | −4.6 |
| Labor (A-C) | Tom Walsh | 6,553 | 15.3 | +15.3 |
| Total formal votes | | 42,820 | 97.7 | |
| Informal votes | | 1,021 | 2.3 | |
| Turnout | | 43,841 | 94.5 | |
Two-party-preferred result
| Labor | Alan Bird | 22,146 | 51.7 | −7.9 |
| Liberal | Fred Capp | 20,674 | 48.3 | +7.9 |
| Labor hold | | Swing | −7.9 | |

=== Bendigo ===
This section is an excerpt from Electoral results for the Division of Bendigo § 1955

1955 Australian federal election: Bendigo
| Party | Candidate | Votes | % | ±% |
|---|---|---|---|---|
| Labor | Percy Clarey | 19,006 | 46.2 | −8.5 |
| Liberal | Bill Day | 16,637 | 40.4 | −4.9 |
| Labor (A-C) | Jim Brosnan | 5,502 | 13.4 | +13.4 |
| Total formal votes | | 41,145 | 98.4 | |
| Informal votes | | 667 | 1.6 | |
| Turnout | | 41,812 | 95.7 | |
Two-party-preferred result
| Labor | Percy Clarey | 21,075 | 51.2 | −3.5 |
| Liberal | Bill Day | 20,070 | 48.8 | +3.5 |
| Labor hold | | Swing | −3.5 | |

=== Bruce ===
This section is an excerpt from Electoral results for the Division of Bruce § 1955

1955 Australian federal election: Bruce
| Party | Candidate | Votes | % | ±% |
|---|---|---|---|---|
| Liberal | Billy Snedden | 21,127 | 47.7 | −4.4 |
| Labor | Keith Ewert | 18,335 | 41.4 | −5.0 |
| Labor (A-C) | Reginald Kearney | 4,873 | 11.0 | +11.0 |
| Total formal votes | | 44,335 | 97.3 | |
| Informal votes | | 1,227 | 2.7 | |
| Turnout | | 45,562 | 94.2 | |
Two-party-preferred result
| Liberal | Billy Snedden | 24,705 | 55.7 | +3.5 |
| Labor | Keith Ewert | 19,630 | 44.3 | −3.5 |
| Liberal notional hold | | Swing | +3.5 | |

=== Chisholm ===
This section is an excerpt from Electoral results for the Division of Chisholm § 1955

1955 Australian federal election: Chisholm
| Party | Candidate | Votes | % | ±% |
|---|---|---|---|---|
| Liberal | Wilfrid Kent Hughes | 26,394 | 65.1 | +0.1 |
| Labor | John Stewart | 10,114 | 25.0 | −10.0 |
| Labor (A-C) | Leonora Lloyd | 4,006 | 9.9 | +9.9 |
| Total formal votes | | 40,514 | 98.1 | |
| Informal votes | | 786 | 1.9 | |
| Turnout | | 41,300 | 94.8 | |
Two-party-preferred result
| Liberal | Wilfrid Kent Hughes | | 73.0 | +8.0 |
| Labor | John Stewart | | 27.0 | −8.0 |
| Liberal hold | | Swing | +8.0 | |

=== Corangamite ===
This section is an excerpt from Electoral results for the Division of Corangamite § 1955

1955 Australian federal election: Corangamite
| Party | Candidate | Votes | % | ±% |
|---|---|---|---|---|
| Liberal | Dan Mackinnon | 24,349 | 60.8 | +2.3 |
| Labor | Edwin Morris | 10,463 | 26.1 | −15.4 |
| Labor (A-C) | Leo O'Brien | 5,210 | 13.0 | +13.0 |
| Total formal votes | | 40,022 | 98.0 | |
| Informal votes | | 809 | 2.0 | |
| Turnout | | 40,831 | 96.1 | |
Two-party-preferred result
| Liberal | Dan Mackinnon | | 71.2 | +12.7 |
| Labor | Edwin Morris | | 28.8 | −12.7 |
| Liberal hold | | Swing | +12.7 | |

=== Corio ===
This section is an excerpt from Electoral results for the Division of Corio § 1955

1955 Australian federal election: Corio
| Party | Candidate | Votes | % | ±% |
|---|---|---|---|---|
| Liberal | Hubert Opperman | 19,959 | 49.3 | −0.5 |
| Labor | Charles Loader | 16,632 | 41.0 | −9.2 |
| Labor (A-C) | Francis Singleton | 3,929 | 9.7 | +9.7 |
| Total formal votes | | 40,520 | 98.4 | |
| Informal votes | | 657 | 1.6 | |
| Turnout | | 41,177 | 93.9 | |
Two-party-preferred result
| Liberal | Hubert Opperman | 23,182 | 57.2 | +7.4 |
| Labor | Charles Loader | 17,338 | 42.8 | −7.4 |
| Liberal gain from Labor | | Swing | −5.9 | |

=== Darebin ===
This section is an excerpt from Electoral results for the Division of Darebin § 1955

1955 Australian federal election: Darebin
| Party | Candidate | Votes | % | ±% |
|---|---|---|---|---|
| Labor | Robert Holt | 20,323 | 47.9 | −16.1 |
| Liberal | Charles White | 11,481 | 27.0 | −9.0 |
| Labor (A-C) | Tom Andrews | 10,660 | 25.1 | +25.1 |
| Total formal votes | | 42,464 | 97.5 | |
| Informal votes | | 1,104 | 2.5 | |
| Turnout | | 43,568 | 95.4 | |
Two-party-preferred result
| Labor | Robert Holt | 24,948 | 58.8 | −5.2 |
| Liberal | Charles White | 17,516 | 41.2 | +5.2 |
| Labor hold | | Swing | −5.2 | |

=== Deakin ===
This section is an excerpt from Electoral results for the Division of Deakin § 1955

1955 Australian federal election: Deakin
| Party | Candidate | Votes | % | ±% |
|---|---|---|---|---|
| Liberal | Frank Davis | 21,641 | 53.3 | +0.0 |
| Labor | Norm Griffiths | 13,422 | 33.1 | −13.6 |
| Labor (A-C) | Terence Collins | 5,512 | 13.6 | +13.6 |
| Total formal votes | | 40,575 | 97.7 | |
| Informal votes | | 947 | 2.3 | |
| Turnout | | 41,522 | 94.5 | |
Two-party-preferred result
| Liberal | Frank Davis | | 64.4 | +11.1 |
| Labor | Norm Griffiths | | 35.6 | −11.1 |
| Liberal hold | | Swing | +11.1 | |

=== Fawkner ===
This section is an excerpt from Electoral results for the Division of Fawkner § 1955

1955 Australian federal election: Fawkner
| Party | Candidate | Votes | % | ±% |
|---|---|---|---|---|
| Liberal | Peter Howson | 17,645 | 46.2 | −4.7 |
| Labor (A-C) | Bill Bourke | 10,450 | 27.3 | +27.3 |
| Labor | Patrick Thompson | 10,132 | 26.5 | −22.6 |
| Total formal votes | | 38,227 | 97.0 | |
| Informal votes | | 1,166 | 3.0 | |
| Turnout | | 39,393 | 93.1 | |
Two-party-preferred result
| Liberal | Peter Howson | 19,992 | 52.3 | +1.4 |
| Labor (A-C) | Bill Bourke | 18,235 | 47.7 | −1.4 |
| Liberal hold | | Swing | +1.4 | |

=== Flinders ===
This section is an excerpt from Electoral results for the Division of Flinders § 1955

1955 Australian federal election: Flinders
| Party | Candidate | Votes | % | ±% |
|---|---|---|---|---|
| Liberal | Robert Lindsay | 21,515 | 53.1 | +2.5 |
| Labor | Francis Cranston | 13,001 | 32.1 | −17.3 |
| Labor (A-C) | Jack Austin | 6,015 | 14.8 | +14.8 |
| Total formal votes | | 40,531 | 97.0 | |
| Informal votes | | 1,235 | 3.0 | |
| Turnout | | 41,766 | 94.3 | |
Two-party-preferred result
| Liberal | Robert Lindsay | | 64.1 | +13.5 |
| Labor | Francis Cranston | | 35.9 | −13.5 |
| Liberal hold | | Swing | +13.5 | |

=== Gellibrand ===
This section is an excerpt from Electoral results for the Division of Gellibrand § 1955

1955 Australian federal election: Gellibrand
| Party | Candidate | Votes | % | ±% |
|---|---|---|---|---|
| Labor | Hector McIvor | 24,324 | 61.4 | −10.0 |
| Liberal | John Bown | 8,741 | 22.1 | −2.0 |
| Labor (A-C) | James Eudey | 5,733 | 14.5 | +14.5 |
| Communist | Frank Johnson | 788 | 2.0 | −2.3 |
| Total formal votes | | 39,586 | 96.0 | |
| Informal votes | | 1,654 | 4.0 | |
| Turnout | | 41,240 | 95.2 | |
Two-party-preferred result
| Labor | Hector McIvor | | 66.1 | −9.1 |
| Liberal | John Bown | | 33.9 | +9.1 |
| Labor hold | | Swing | −9.1 | |

=== Gippsland ===
This section is an excerpt from Electoral results for the Division of Gippsland § 1955

1955 Australian federal election: Gippsland
| Party | Candidate | Votes | % | ±% |
|---|---|---|---|---|
| Country | George Bowden | 24,382 | 62.6 | +2.9 |
| Labor | Clement Little | 9,631 | 24.7 | −15.6 |
| Labor (A-C) | Frank Burns | 4,951 | 12.7 | +12.7 |
| Total formal votes | | 38,964 | 98.0 | |
| Informal votes | | 785 | 2.0 | |
| Turnout | | 39,749 | 95.2 | |
Two-party-preferred result
| Country | George Bowden | | 73.0 | +13.3 |
| Labor | Clement Little | | 27.0 | −13.3 |
| Country hold | | Swing | +13.3 | |

=== Henty ===
This section is an excerpt from Electoral results for the Division of Henty § 1955

1955 Australian federal election: Henty
| Party | Candidate | Votes | % | ±% |
|---|---|---|---|---|
| Liberal | Max Fox | 22,377 | 54.2 | +0.6 |
| Labor | Percy Treyvaud | 13,953 | 33.8 | −11.9 |
| Labor (A-C) | Henry Moore | 4,966 | 12.0 | +12.0 |
| Total formal votes | | 41,296 | 97.3 | |
| Informal votes | | 1,146 | 2.7 | |
| Turnout | | 42,442 | 94.8 | |
Two-party-preferred result
| Liberal | Max Fox | | 63.8 | +9.5 |
| Labor | Percy Treyvaud | | 36.2 | −9.5 |
| Liberal hold | | Swing | +9.5 | |

=== Higgins ===
This section is an excerpt from Electoral results for the Division of Higgins § 1955

1955 Australian federal election: Higgins
| Party | Candidate | Votes | % | ±% |
|---|---|---|---|---|
| Liberal | Harold Holt | 25,476 | 64.4 | +0.2 |
| Labor | Andrew Hughes | 8,752 | 22.1 | −12.5 |
| Labor (A-C) | John Fitzgerald | 5,331 | 13.5 | +13.5 |
| Total formal votes | | 39,559 | 97.5 | |
| Informal votes | | 1,000 | 2.5 | |
| Turnout | | 40,559 | 93.0 | |
Two-party-preferred result
| Liberal | Harold Holt | | 75.4 | +10.7 |
| Labor | Andrew Hughes | | 24.6 | −10.7 |
| Liberal hold | | Swing | +10.7 | |

=== Higinbotham ===
This section is an excerpt from Electoral results for the Division of Higinbotham § 1955

1955 Australian federal election: Higinbotham
| Party | Candidate | Votes | % | ±% |
|---|---|---|---|---|
| Liberal | Frank Timson | 21,251 | 50.8 | −3.2 |
| Labor | Les Coates | 16,419 | 39.2 | −6.8 |
| Labor (A-C) | Frank Gaffy | 4,176 | 10.0 | +10.0 |
| Total formal votes | | 41,846 | 97.7 | |
| Informal votes | | 968 | 2.3 | |
| Turnout | | 42,814 | 95.1 | |
Two-party-preferred result
| Liberal | Frank Timson | | 58.8 | +4.8 |
| Labor | Les Coates | | 41.2 | −4.8 |
| Liberal hold | | Swing | +4.8 | |

=== Indi ===
This section is an excerpt from Electoral results for the Division of Indi § 1955

1955 Australian federal election: Indi
| Party | Candidate | Votes | % | ±% |
|---|---|---|---|---|
| Liberal | William Bostock | 23,567 | 59.6 | +14.6 |
| Labor | Carl Reeves | 9,815 | 24.8 | −13.4 |
| Labor (A-C) | William Findlay | 6,179 | 15.6 | +15.6 |
| Total formal votes | | 39,561 | 98.2 | |
| Informal votes | | 741 | 1.8 | |
| Turnout | | 40,302 | 94.8 | |
Two-party-preferred result
| Liberal | William Bostock | | 72.1 | +10.3 |
| Labor | Carl Reeves | | 27.9 | −10.3 |
| Liberal hold | | Swing | +10.3 | |

=== Isaacs ===
This section is an excerpt from Electoral results for the Division of Isaacs (1949–1969) § 1955

1955 Australian federal election: Isaacs
| Party | Candidate | Votes | % | ±% |
|---|---|---|---|---|
| Liberal | William Haworth | 20,670 | 54.5 | −1.2 |
| Labor | Barry Jones | 12,644 | 33.3 | −11.0 |
| Labor (A-C) | John Hughes | 4,610 | 12.2 | +12.2 |
| Total formal votes | | 37,924 | 96.5 | |
| Informal votes | | 1,361 | 3.5 | |
| Turnout | | 39,285 | 92.2 | |
Two-party-preferred result
| Liberal | William Haworth | | 64.3 | +8.6 |
| Labor | Barry Jones | | 35.7 | −8.6 |
| Liberal hold | | Swing | +8.6 | |

=== Kooyong ===
This section is an excerpt from Electoral results for the Division of Kooyong § 1955

1955 Australian federal election: Kooyong
| Party | Candidate | Votes | % | ±% |
|---|---|---|---|---|
| Liberal | Robert Menzies | 28,363 | 66.6 | −2.7 |
| Labor | Dolph Eddy | 9,350 | 22.0 | −6.9 |
| Labor (A-C) | Kevin Gregson | 4,371 | 10.3 | +10.3 |
| Communist | Gerry O'Day | 507 | 1.2 | −0.6 |
| Total formal votes | | 42,591 | 98.0 | |
| Informal votes | | 855 | 2.0 | |
| Turnout | | 43,446 | 95.0 | |
Two-party-preferred result
| Liberal | Robert Menzies | | 74.9 | +5.5 |
| Labor | Dolph Eddy | | 25.1 | −5.5 |
| Liberal hold | | Swing | +5.5 | |

=== La Trobe ===
This section is an excerpt from Electoral results for the Division of La Trobe § 1955

1955 Australian federal election: La Trobe
| Party | Candidate | Votes | % | ±% |
|---|---|---|---|---|
| Liberal | Richard Casey | 24,442 | 57.6 | +5.8 |
| Labor | Bill Webber | 14,177 | 33.4 | −14.8 |
| Labor (A-C) | George Noone | 3,830 | 9.0 | +9.0 |
| Total formal votes | | 42,449 | 97.5 | |
| Informal votes | | 1,101 | 2.5 | |
| Turnout | | 43,550 | 94.5 | |
Two-party-preferred result
| Liberal | Richard Casey | | 64.8 | +13.0 |
| Labor | Bill Webber | | 35.2 | −13.0 |
| Liberal hold | | Swing | +13.0 | |

=== Lalor ===
This section is an excerpt from Electoral results for the Division of Lalor § 1955

1955 Australian federal election: Lalor
| Party | Candidate | Votes | % | ±% |
|---|---|---|---|---|
| Labor | Reg Pollard | 21,036 | 49.1 | −11.1 |
| Liberal | Peter Kemp | 15,953 | 37.2 | −2.6 |
| Labor (A-C) | William Lloyd | 5,845 | 13.6 | +13.6 |
| Total formal votes | | 42,834 | 97.2 | |
| Informal votes | | 1,222 | 2.8 | |
| Turnout | | 44,056 | 93.4 | |
Two-party-preferred result
| Labor | Reg Pollard | 21,821 | 50.9 | −9.3 |
| Liberal | Peter Kemp | 21,013 | 49.1 | +9.3 |
| Labor hold | | Swing | −9.3 | |

=== Mallee ===
This section is an excerpt from Electoral results for the Division of Mallee § 1955

1955 Australian federal election: Mallee
| Party | Candidate | Votes | % | ±% |
|---|---|---|---|---|
| Country | Winton Turnbull | 24,303 | 65.6 | −34.4 |
| Labor | William Nicholas | 7,933 | 21.4 | +21.4 |
| Labor (A-C) | Edwin Leyden | 4,837 | 13.0 | +13.0 |
| Total formal votes | | 37,073 | 97.4 | |
| Informal votes | | 985 | 2.6 | |
| Turnout | | 38,058 | 95.9 | |
Two-party-preferred result
| Country | Winton Turnbull | | 75.2 | −24.8 |
| Labor | William Nicholas | | 24.8 | +24.8 |
| Country hold | | Swing | −24.8 | |

=== Maribyrnong ===
This section is an excerpt from Electoral results for the Division of Maribyrnong § 1955

1955 Australian federal election: Maribyrnong
| Party | Candidate | Votes | % | ±% |
|---|---|---|---|---|
| Labor | Arthur Drakeford | 19,014 | 47.1 | −9.6 |
| Liberal | Philip Stokes | 15,099 | 37.4 | −5.1 |
| Labor (A-C) | David Purcell | 6,217 | 15.4 | +15.4 |
| Total formal votes | | 40,330 | 97.6 | |
| Informal votes | | 1,010 | 2.4 | |
| Turnout | | 41,340 | 94.4 | |
Two-party-preferred result
| Liberal | Philip Stokes | 20,222 | 50.1 | +7.5 |
| Labor | Arthur Drakeford | 20,108 | 49.9 | −7.5 |
| Liberal gain from Labor | | Swing | +7.5 | |

=== McMillan ===
This section is an excerpt from Electoral results for the Division of McMillan § 1955

1955 Australian federal election: McMillan
| Party | Candidate | Votes | % | ±% |
|---|---|---|---|---|
| Liberal | Alex Buchanan | 20,197 | 52.0 | +10.7 |
| Labor | Horace Hawkins | 13,430 | 34.6 | −8.3 |
| Labor (A-C) | Desmond Devlin | 5,193 | 13.4 | +13.4 |
| Total formal votes | | 38,820 | 97.6 | |
| Informal votes | | 969 | 2.4 | |
| Turnout | | 39,789 | 94.5 | |
Two-party-preferred result
| Liberal | Alex Buchanan | | 62.7 | +7.3 |
| Labor | Horace Hawkins | | 37.3 | −7.3 |
| Liberal hold | | Swing | +7.3 | |

=== Melbourne ===
This section is an excerpt from Electoral results for the Division of Melbourne § 1955

1955 Australian federal election: Melbourne
| Party | Candidate | Votes | % | ±% |
|---|---|---|---|---|
| Labor | Arthur Calwell | 21,767 | 57.4 | −12.7 |
| Labor (A-C) | John Mullens | 8,126 | 21.4 | +21.4 |
| Liberal | James Moloney | 8,060 | 21.2 | −8.7 |
| Total formal votes | | 37,953 | 95.5 | |
| Informal votes | | 1,771 | 4.5 | |
| Turnout | | 39,724 | 92.1 | |
Two-candidate-preferred result
| Labor | Arthur Calwell | | 59.5 | −10.6 |
| Labor (A-C) | John Mullens | | 40.5 | +40.5 |
| Labor hold | | Swing | −10.5 | |

=== Melbourne Ports ===
This section is an excerpt from Electoral results for the Division of Melbourne Ports § 1955

1955 Australian federal election: Melbourne Ports
| Party | Candidate | Votes | % | ±% |
|---|---|---|---|---|
| Labor | Frank Crean | 19,917 | 52.0 | −14.7 |
| Labor (A-C) | Stan Corrigan | 9,662 | 25.2 | +25.2 |
| Liberal | Harold Sher | 7,531 | 19.7 | −7.8 |
| Communist | Alex Dobbin | 1,193 | 3.1 | −2.7 |
| Total formal votes | | 38,303 | 95.9 | |
| Informal votes | | 1,645 | 4.1 | |
| Turnout | | 39,948 | 93.9 | |
Two-party-preferred result
| Labor | Frank Crean | | 56.8 | −15.0 |
| Labor (A-C) | Stan Corrigan | | 43.2 | +43.2 |
| Labor hold | | Swing | −15.0 | |

=== Murray ===
This section is an excerpt from Electoral results for the Division of Murray § 1955

1955 Australian federal election: Murray
| Party | Candidate | Votes | % | ±% |
|---|---|---|---|---|
| Country | John McEwen | 24,192 | 60.7 | −39.3 |
| Labor | James Cameron | 10,269 | 25.8 | +25.8 |
| Labor (A-C) | Michael Reilly | 5,383 | 13.5 | +13.5 |
| Total formal votes | | 39,844 | 97.3 | |
| Informal votes | | 1,125 | 2.7 | |
| Turnout | | 40,969 | 95.8 | |
Two-party-preferred result
| Country | John McEwen | | 71.5 | −28.5 |
| Labor | James Cameron | | 28.5 | +28.5 |
| Country hold | | Swing | −28.5 | |

=== Scullin ===
This section is an excerpt from Electoral results for the Division of Scullin (1955–69) § 1955

1955 Australian federal election: Scullin
| Party | Candidate | Votes | % | ±% |
|---|---|---|---|---|
| Labor | Ted Peters | 18,896 | 49.7 | −23.4 |
| Labor (A-C) | Jack Cremean | 11,643 | 30.6 | +30.6 |
| Liberal | Phillip Lynch | 7,450 | 19.6 | −3.3 |
| Total formal votes | | 37,989 | 94.9 | |
| Informal votes | | 2,061 | 5.1 | |
| Turnout | | 40,050 | 92.1 | |
Two-party-preferred result
| Labor | Ted Peters | 19,655 | 51.7 | −24.9 |
| Labor (A-C) | Jack Cremean | 18,334 | 48.3 | +48.3 |
| Labor notional hold | | Swing | −24.9 | |

=== Wannon ===
This section is an excerpt from Electoral results for the Division of Wannon § 1955

1955 Australian federal election: Wannon
| Party | Candidate | Votes | % | ±% |
|---|---|---|---|---|
| Liberal | Malcolm Fraser | 19,911 | 48.9 | −1.9 |
| Labor | Roy Cundy | 14,522 | 35.6 | −13.6 |
| Labor (A-C) | Terence Callander | 6,322 | 15.5 | +15.5 |
| Total formal votes | | 40,755 | 98.3 | |
| Informal votes | | 687 | 1.7 | |
| Turnout | | 41,442 | 96.7 | |
Two-party-preferred result
| Liberal | Malcolm Fraser | 24,183 | 59.3 | +8.5 |
| Labor | Roy Cundy | 16,572 | 40.7 | −8.5 |
| Liberal hold | | Swing | +8.5 | |

=== Wills ===
This section is an excerpt from Electoral results for the Division of Wills § 1955

1955 Australian federal election: Wills
| Party | Candidate | Votes | % | ±% |
|---|---|---|---|---|
| Labor | Gordon Bryant | 19,363 | 47.3 | −18.5 |
| Liberal | Alfred Wall | 11,478 | 28.0 | −4.9 |
| Labor (A-C) | Bill Bryson | 10,115 | 24.7 | +24.7 |
| Total formal votes | | 40,956 | 96.9 | |
| Informal votes | | 1,316 | 3.1 | |
| Turnout | | 42,272 | 94.5 | |
Two-party-preferred result
| Labor | Gordon Bryant | 22,269 | 54.4 | −12.5 |
| Liberal | Alfred Wall | 18,687 | 45.6 | +12.5 |
| Labor hold | | Swing | −12.5 | |

=== Wimmera ===
This section is an excerpt from Electoral results for the Division of Wimmera § 1955

1955 Australian federal election: Wimmera
| Party | Candidate | Votes | % | ±% |
|---|---|---|---|---|
| Liberal | William Lawrence | 22,833 | 58.6 | +15.1 |
| Labor | Winston Lamb | 11,745 | 30.1 | −7.1 |
| Labor (A-C) | Bernard Flanagan | 4,413 | 11.3 | +11.3 |
| Total formal votes | | 38,991 | 98.3 | |
| Informal votes | | 659 | 1.7 | |
| Turnout | | 39,650 | 97.0 | |
Two-party-preferred result
| Liberal | William Lawrence | | 66.8 | +5.0 |
| Labor | Winston Lamb | | 33.2 | −5.0 |
| Liberal hold | | Swing | +5.0 | |

=== Yarra ===
This section is an excerpt from Electoral results for the Division of Yarra § 1955

1955 Australian federal election: Yarra
| Party | Candidate | Votes | % | ±% |
|---|---|---|---|---|
| Labor | Jim Cairns | 18,363 | 47.5 | −19.1 |
| Labor (A-C) | Stan Keon | 10,492 | 27.1 | +27.1 |
| Liberal | James Wilkie | 9,016 | 23.3 | −6.8 |
| Communist | Ken Miller | 792 | 2.0 | −1.2 |
| Total formal votes | | 38,663 | 95.6 | |
| Informal votes | | 1,796 | 4.4 | |
| Turnout | | 40,459 | 93.6 | |
Two-party-preferred result
| Labor | Jim Cairns | 19,727 | 51.0 | −18.6 |
| Labor (A-C) | Stan Keon | 18,936 | 49.0 | +49.0 |
| Labor hold | | Swing | −18.6 | |

== Queensland ==
1955 Australian federal election (Queensland)
| ← 1954 | 10 December 1955 | 1958 → |

All 18 Queensland seats in the House of Representatives 9 seats needed for a majority
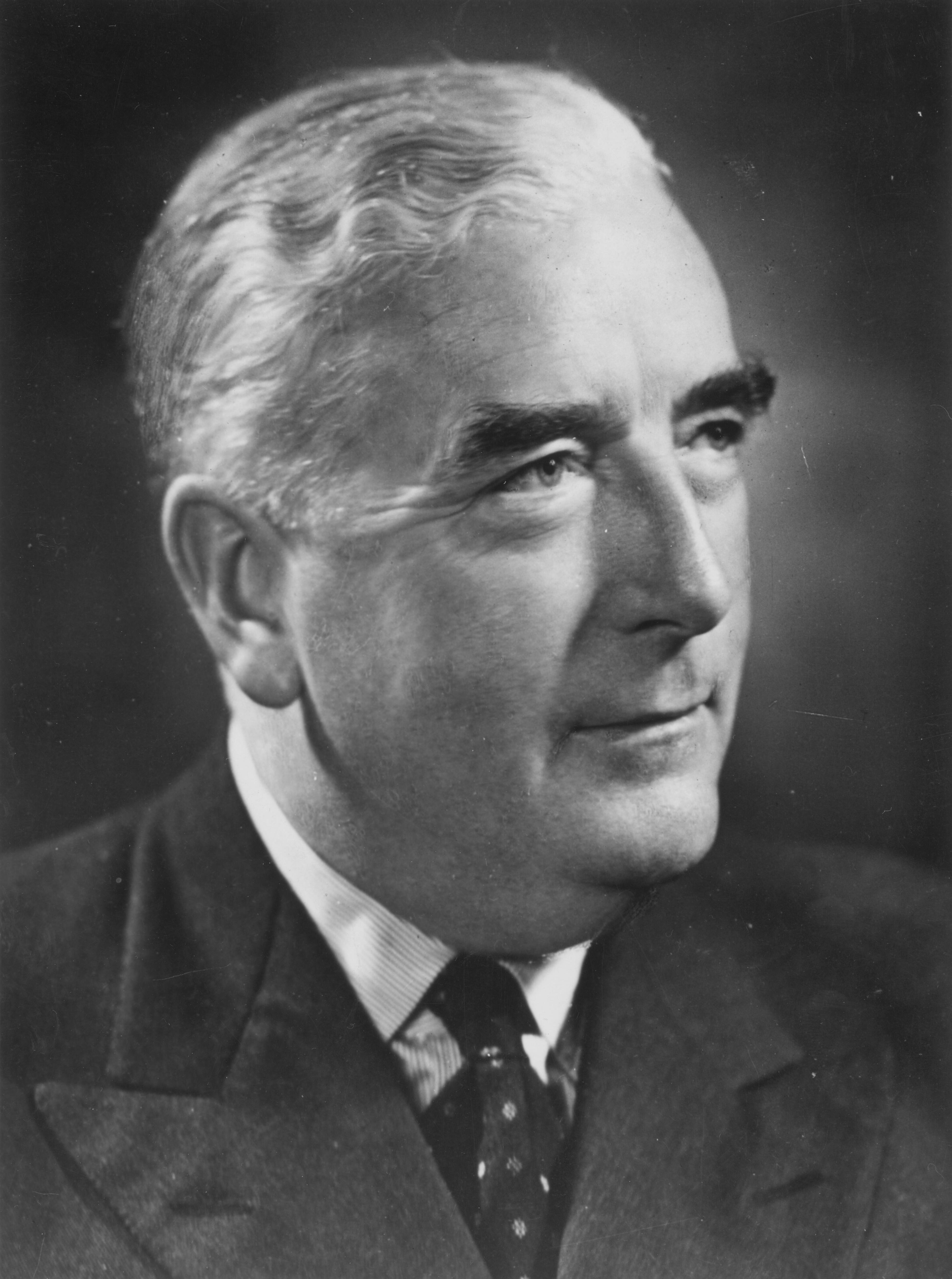

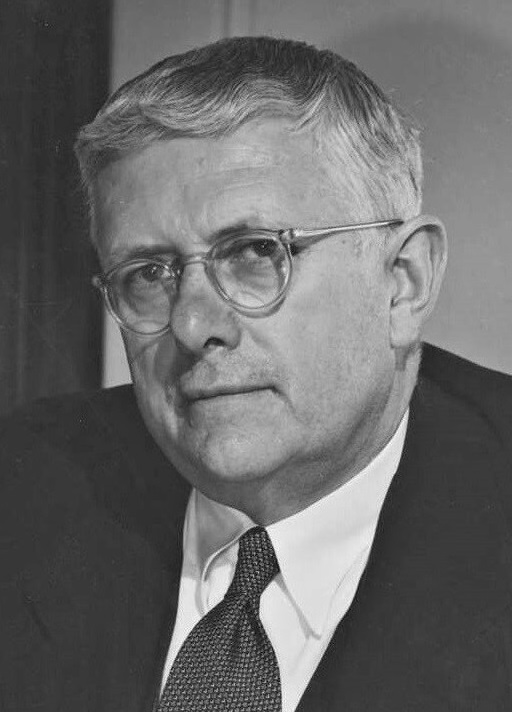
| | First party | Second party |
|---|---|---|
| Leader | Robert Menzies | H. V. Evatt |
| Party | Coalition | Labor |
| Seats before | 13 | 5 |
| Seats won | 13 | 5 |
| Seat change | Steady | Steady |
| Popular vote | 325,215 | 258,994 |
| Percentage | 52.8% | 42.1% |
| Swing | ▼1.2pp | ▼0.4pp |
| TPP | 56.1% | 43.9% |
| TPP swing | ▲0.9pp | ▼0.9pp |

=== Bowman ===
This section is an excerpt from Electoral results for the Division of Bowman § 1955

1955 Australian federal election: Bowman
| Party | Candidate | Votes | % | ±% |
|---|---|---|---|---|
| Liberal | Malcolm McColm | 22,500 | 54.7 | +0.7 |
| Labor | Hector Chalmers | 18,646 | 45.3 | +1.1 |
| Total formal votes | | 41,146 | 97.8 | |
| Informal votes | | 935 | 2.2 | |
| Turnout | | 42,081 | 95.2 | |
| Liberal hold | | Swing | −0.1 | |

=== Brisbane ===
This section is an excerpt from Electoral results for the Division of Brisbane § 1955

1955 Australian federal election: Brisbane
| Party | Candidate | Votes | % | ±% |
|---|---|---|---|---|
| Labor | George Lawson | 21,619 | 52.9 | −2.5 |
| Liberal | Kevin Cairns | 18,001 | 44.0 | +1.2 |
| Communist | Claude Jones | 1,269 | 3.1 | +0.5 |
| Total formal votes | | 40,889 | 97.2 | |
| Informal votes | | 1,190 | 2.8 | |
| Turnout | | 42,079 | 92.4 | |
Two-party-preferred result
| Labor | George Lawson | | 55.7 | −1.3 |
| Liberal | Kevin Cairns | | 44.3 | +1.3 |
| Labor hold | | Swing | −1.3 | |

=== Capricornia ===
This section is an excerpt from Electoral results for the Division of Capricornia § 1955

1955 Australian federal election: Capricornia
| Party | Candidate | Votes | % | ±% |
|---|---|---|---|---|
| Liberal | Henry Pearce | 19,617 | 53.8 | +0.5 |
| Labor | Colin Maxwell | 15,804 | 43.4 | −2.2 |
| Communist | Eric Browne | 1,026 | 2.8 | +1.7 |
| Total formal votes | | 36,447 | 97.8 | |
| Informal votes | | 823 | 2.2 | |
| Turnout | | 37,270 | 96.9 | |
Two-party-preferred result
| Liberal | Henry Pearce | | 54.0 | +0.2 |
| Labor | Colin Maxwell | | 46.0 | −0.2 |
| Liberal hold | | Swing | +0.2 | |

=== Darling Downs ===
This section is an excerpt from Electoral results for the Division of Darling Downs § 1955

1955 Australian federal election: Darling Downs
| Party | Candidate | Votes | % | ±% |
|---|---|---|---|---|
| Liberal | Reginald Swartz | unopposed | | |
| Liberal hold | | Swing | | |

=== Dawson ===
This section is an excerpt from Electoral results for the Division of Dawson § 1955

1955 Australian federal election: Dawson
| Party | Candidate | Votes | % | ±% |
|---|---|---|---|---|
| Country | Charles Davidson | 21,624 | 61.2 | +4.0 |
| Labor | Stanley Dalton | 13,541 | 38.8 | −3.5 |
| Total formal votes | | 34,865 | 98.3 | |
| Informal votes | | 618 | 1.7 | |
| Turnout | | 35,483 | 94.9 | |
| Country hold | | Swing | +3.8 | |

=== Fisher ===
This section is an excerpt from Electoral results for the Division of Fisher § 1955

1955 Australian federal election: Fisher
| Party | Candidate | Votes | % | ±% |
|---|---|---|---|---|
| Country | Charles Adermann | unopposed | | |
| Country hold | | Swing | | |

=== Griffith ===
This section is an excerpt from Electoral results for the Division of Griffith § 1955

1955 Australian federal election: Griffith
| Party | Candidate | Votes | % | ±% |
|---|---|---|---|---|
| Labor | Wilfred Coutts | 20,936 | 51.3 | −3.4 |
| Liberal | Doug Berry | 19,896 | 48.7 | +3.4 |
| Total formal votes | | 40,832 | 97.8 | |
| Informal votes | | 920 | 2.2 | |
| Turnout | | 41,752 | 94.4 | |
| Labor hold | | Swing | −3.4 | |

=== Herbert ===
This section is an excerpt from Electoral results for the Division of Herbert § 1955

1955 Australian federal election: Herbert
| Party | Candidate | Votes | % | ±% |
|---|---|---|---|---|
| Labor | Bill Edmonds | 18,825 | 50.7 | −5.1 |
| Country | Arnold White | 15,885 | 42.8 | +2.1 |
| Communist | Frank Bishop | 2,416 | 6.5 | +3.0 |
| Total formal votes | | 37,126 | 97.3 | |
| Informal votes | | 1,012 | 2.7 | |
| Turnout | | 38,138 | 92.8 | |
Two-party-preferred result
| Labor | Bill Edmonds | | 56.6 | −2.3 |
| Country | Arnold White | | 43.4 | +2.3 |
| Labor hold | | Swing | −2.3 | |

=== Kennedy ===
This section is an excerpt from Electoral results for the Division of Kennedy § 1955

1955 Australian federal election: Kennedy
| Party | Candidate | Votes | % | ±% |
|---|---|---|---|---|
| Labor | Bill Riordan | 17,366 | 58.2 | −1.8 |
| Country | Timothy Donnelly | 12,457 | 41.8 | +1.8 |
| Total formal votes | | 39,823 | 97.8 | |
| Informal votes | | 658 | 2.2 | |
| Turnout | | 30,481 | 90.4 | |
| Labor hold | | Swing | −1.8 | |

=== Leichhardt ===
This section is an excerpt from Electoral results for the Division of Leichhardt § 1955

1955 Australian federal election: Leichhardt
| Party | Candidate | Votes | % | ±% |
|---|---|---|---|---|
| Labor | Harry Bruce | 18,512 | 49.9 | −1.5 |
| Country | Tom Gilmore | 17,844 | 48.1 | +1.4 |
| Communist | Frank Falls | 759 | 2.0 | +0.0 |
| Total formal votes | | 37,115 | 97.7 | |
| Informal votes | | 860 | 2.3 | |
| Turnout | | 37,975 | 92.1 | |
Two-party-preferred result
| Labor | Harry Bruce | 19,188 | 51.7 | −0.6 |
| Country | Tom Gilmore | 17,927 | 48.3 | +0.6 |
| Labor hold | | Swing | −0.6 | |

=== Lilley ===
This section is an excerpt from Electoral results for the Division of Lilley § 1955

1955 Australian federal election: Lilley
| Party | Candidate | Votes | % | ±% |
|---|---|---|---|---|
| Liberal | Bruce Wight | 23,186 | 58.1 | −0.1 |
| Labor | Jack Melloy | 16,742 | 41.9 | +0.1 |
| Total formal votes | | 39,928 | 97.9 | |
| Informal votes | | 865 | 2.1 | |
| Turnout | | 40,793 | 93.9 | |
| Liberal hold | | Swing | −0.1 | |

=== Maranoa ===
This section is an excerpt from Electoral results for the Division of Maranoa § 1955

1955 Australian federal election: Maranoa
| Party | Candidate | Votes | % | ±% |
|---|---|---|---|---|
| Country | Wilfred Brimblecombe | 15,363 | 44.6 | +2.3 |
| Independent | Charles Russell | 15,066 | 43.7 | +26.3 |
| Independent | Paul Bauers | 4,035 | 11.7 | +11.7 |
| Total formal votes | | 34,464 | 98.0 | |
| Informal votes | | 710 | 2.0 | |
| Turnout | | 35,174 | 92.3 | |
Two-party-preferred result
| Country | Wilfred Brimblecombe | 17,596 | 51.1 | −3.0 |
| Independent | Charles Russell | 16,868 | 48.9 | +48.9 |
| Country hold | | Swing | −3.0 | |

=== McPherson ===
This section is an excerpt from Electoral results for the Division of McPherson § 1955

1955 Australian federal election: McPherson
| Party | Candidate | Votes | % | ±% |
|---|---|---|---|---|
| Country | Sir Arthur Fadden | 24,269 | 59.5 | −4.9 |
| Labor | David Clarke | 11,942 | 29.3 | +29.3 |
| Independent | Thomas Green | 4,555 | 11.2 | +11.2 |
| Total formal votes | | 40,766 | 97.7 | |
| Informal votes | | 946 | 2.3 | |
| Turnout | | 41,712 | 94.3 | |
Two-party-preferred result
| Country | Sir Arthur Fadden | | 65.1 | −0.2 |
| Labor | David Clarke | | 34.9 | +34.9 |
| Country hold | | Swing | −0.2 | |

=== Moreton ===
This section is an excerpt from Electoral results for the Division of Moreton § 1955

1955 Australian federal election: Moreton
| Party | Candidate | Votes | % | ±% |
|---|---|---|---|---|
| Liberal | James Killen | 20,908 | 51.7 | −4.2 |
| Labor | Allen Edwards | 18,788 | 46.5 | +3.8 |
| Communist | Max Julius | 713 | 1.8 | +0.4 |
| Total formal votes | | 40,409 | 97.8 | |
| Informal votes | | 919 | 2.2 | |
| Turnout | | 41,328 | 94.8 | |
Two-party-preferred result
| Liberal | James Killen | | 51.9 | −4.6 |
| Labor | Allen Edwards | | 48.1 | +4.6 |
| Liberal hold | | Swing | −4.6 | |

=== Oxley ===
This section is an excerpt from Electoral results for the Division of Oxley § 1955

1955 Australian federal election: Oxley
| Party | Candidate | Votes | % | ±% |
|---|---|---|---|---|
| Liberal | Donald Cameron | 23,472 | 59.2 | +2.5 |
| Labor | Norman Thomas | 14,468 | 36.5 | −4.6 |
| Independent | James Dwyer | 1,070 | 2.7 | +2.7 |
| Communist | Mervyn Welsby | 668 | 1.7 | −0.3 |
| Total formal votes | | 39,678 | 97.9 | |
| Informal votes | | 849 | 2.1 | |
| Turnout | | 40,527 | 97.0 | |
Two-party-preferred result
| Liberal | Donald Cameron | | 60.8 | +3.1 |
| Labor | Norman Thomas | | 39.2 | −3.1 |
| Liberal hold | | Swing | +3.1 | |

=== Petrie ===
This section is an excerpt from Electoral results for the Division of Petrie § 1955

1955 Australian federal election: Petrie
| Party | Candidate | Votes | % | ±% |
|---|---|---|---|---|
| Liberal | Alan Hulme | 23,328 | 56.8 | +1.7 |
| Labor | Noel Curran | 17,740 | 43.2 | −1.7 |
| Total formal votes | | 41,068 | 97.6 | |
| Informal votes | | 993 | 2.4 | |
| Turnout | | 42,061 | 95.5 | |
| Liberal hold | | Swing | +1.7 | |

=== Ryan ===
This section is an excerpt from Electoral results for the Division of Ryan § 1955

1955 Australian federal election: Ryan
| Party | Candidate | Votes | % | ±% |
|---|---|---|---|---|
| Liberal | Nigel Drury | 25,306 | 60.8 | +0.1 |
| Labor | Norman Buchan | 16,341 | 39.2 | −0.1 |
| Total formal votes | | 41,647 | 98.0 | |
| Informal votes | | 868 | 2.0 | |
| Turnout | | 42,515 | 94.7 | |
| Liberal hold | | Swing | +0.1 | |

=== Wide Bay ===
This section is an excerpt from Electoral results for the Division of Wide Bay § 1955

1955 Australian federal election: Wide Bay
| Party | Candidate | Votes | % | ±% |
|---|---|---|---|---|
| Country | William Brand | 21,859 | 55.2 | +2.4 |
| Labor | Matthew Tallon | 17,724 | 44.8 | −1.3 |
| Total formal votes | | 39,583 | 98.6 | |
| Informal votes | | 553 | 1.4 | |
| Turnout | | 40,136 | 96.0 | |
| Country hold | | Swing | +1.9 | |

== South Australia ==
1955 Australian federal election (South Australia)
| ← 1954 | 10 December 1955 | 1958 → |

All 11 SA seats in the House of Representatives 6 seats needed for a majority
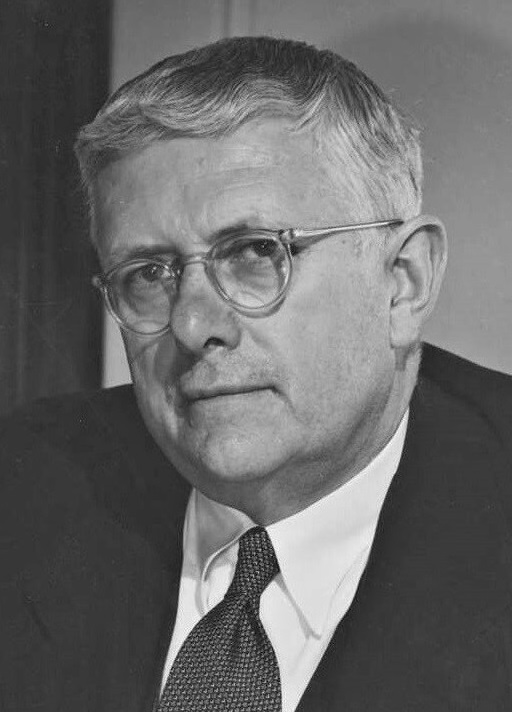

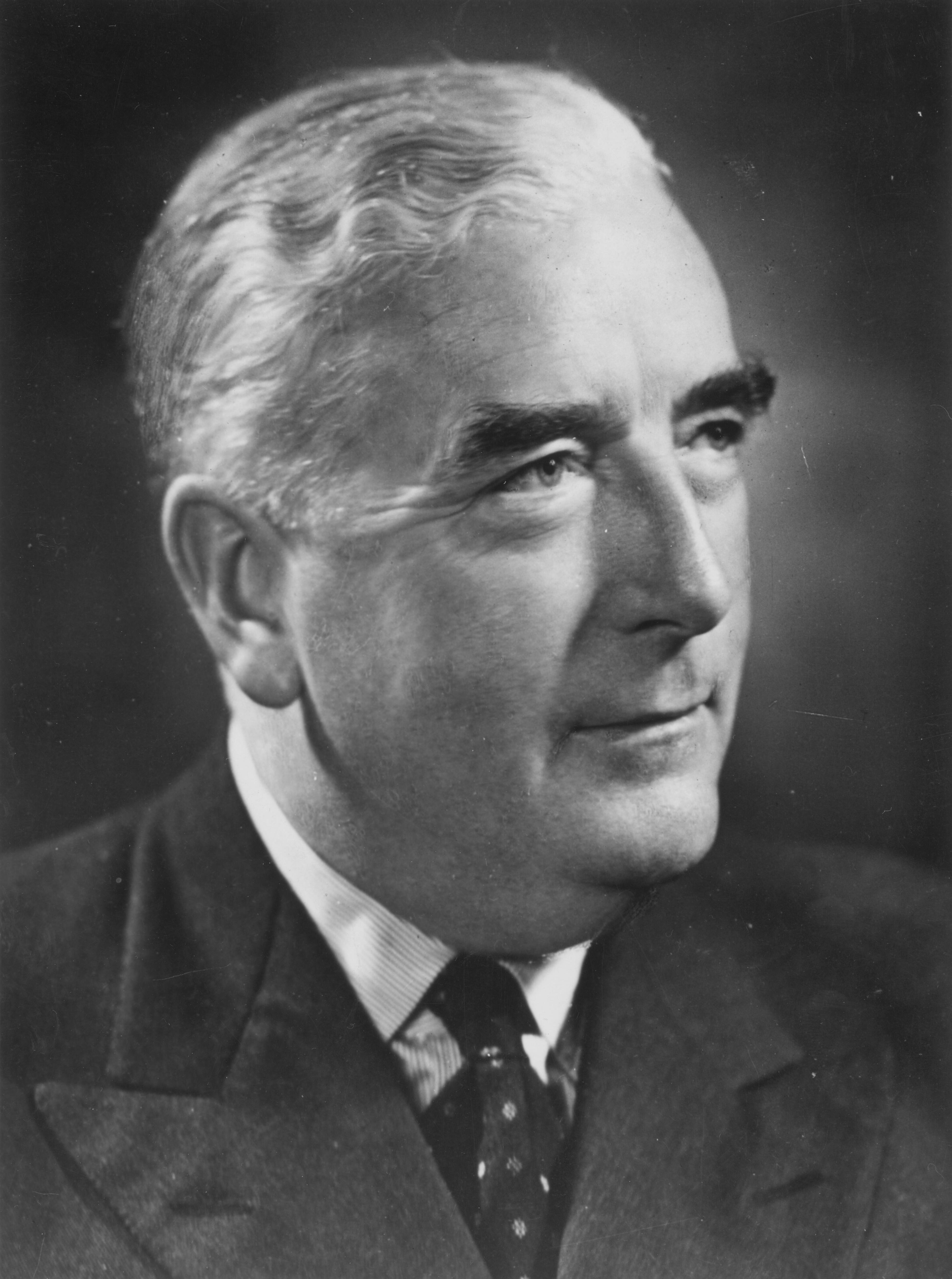
| | First party | Second party |
|---|---|---|
| Leader | H. V. Evatt | Robert Menzies |
| Party | Labor | Coalition |
| Seats before | 6 | 4 |
| Seats won | 6 | 5 |
| Seat change | Steady | ▲1 |
| Popular vote | 207,810 | 197,214 |
| Percentage | 48.7% | 46.8% |
| Swing | ▼6.4pp | ▲3.0pp |
| TPP | 49.0% | 51.0% |
| TPP swing | ▼3.7pp | ▲3.7pp |

=== Adelaide ===
This section is an excerpt from Electoral results for the Division of Adelaide § 1955

1955 Australian federal election: Adelaide
| Party | Candidate | Votes | % | ±% |
|---|---|---|---|---|
| Labor | Cyril Chambers | 18,801 | 50.6 | −11.4 |
| Liberal | James Maitland | 13,430 | 36.1 | −0.3 |
| Labor (A-C) | Olaf Alland | 4,395 | 11.8 | +11.8 |
| Communist | Jim Moss | 526 | 1.4 | −0.3 |
| Total formal votes | | 37,152 | 94.2 | |
| Informal votes | | 2,302 | 5.8 | |
| Turnout | | 39,454 | 95.4 | |
Two-party-preferred result
| Labor | Cyril Chambers | | 55.3 | −8.0 |
| Liberal | James Maitland | | 44.7 | +8.0 |
| Labor hold | | Swing | −8.0 | |

=== Angas ===
This section is an excerpt from Electoral results for the Division of Angas (1949–1977) § 1949

1955 Australian federal election: Angas
| Party | Candidate | Votes | % | ±% |
|---|---|---|---|---|
| Liberal | Alick Downer | 26,823 | 70.0 | −30.0 |
| Labor | Darcy Nielsen | 9,871 | 25.7 | +25.7 |
| Independent | Frank Rieck | 1,643 | 4.3 | +4.3 |
| Total formal votes | | 38,337 | 96.2 | |
| Informal votes | | 1,533 | 3.8 | |
| Turnout | | 39,870 | 96.7 | |
Two-party-preferred result
| Liberal | Alick Downer | | 72.2 | −27.8 |
| Labor | Darcy Nielsen | | 27.8 | +27.8 |
| Liberal hold | | Swing | −27.8 | |

=== Barker ===
This section is an excerpt from Electoral results for the Division of Barker § 1955

1955 Australian federal election: Barker
| Party | Candidate | Votes | % | ±% |
|---|---|---|---|---|
| Liberal | Archie Cameron | 25,993 | 67.7 | +5.5 |
| Labor | Ralph Dettman | 12,398 | 32.3 | −5.5 |
| Total formal votes | | 38,391 | 96.9 | |
| Informal votes | | 1,214 | 3.1 | |
| Turnout | | 39,605 | 96.3 | |
| Liberal hold | | Swing | +5.5 | |

=== Bonython ===
This section is an excerpt from Electoral results for the Division of Bonython § 1955

1955 Australian federal election: Bonython
| Party | Candidate | Votes | % | ±% |
|---|---|---|---|---|
| Labor | Norman Makin | 24,350 | 69.4 | +5.4 |
| Liberal | John Mathwin | 10,723 | 30.6 | −5.1 |
| Total formal votes | | 35,073 | 95.6 | |
| Informal votes | | 1,616 | 4.4 | |
| Turnout | | 36,689 | 95.6 | |
| Labor notional hold | | Swing | +5.4 | |

=== Boothby ===
This section is an excerpt from Electoral results for the Division of Boothby § 1955

1955 Australian federal election: Boothby
| Party | Candidate | Votes | % | ±% |
|---|---|---|---|---|
| Liberal | John McLeay | 22,538 | 56.2 | +2.5 |
| Labor | Rex Mathews | 14,291 | 35.6 | −10.7 |
| Labor (A-C) | John Sutherland | 3,298 | 8.2 | +8.2 |
| Total formal votes | | 40,127 | 96.3 | |
| Informal votes | | 1,501 | 3.7 | |
| Turnout | | 41,628 | 96.1 | |
Two-party-preferred result
| Liberal | John McLeay | | 62.8 | +9.1 |
| Labor | Rex Mathews | | 37.2 | −9.1 |
| Liberal hold | | Swing | +9.1 | |

=== Grey ===
This section is an excerpt from Electoral results for the Division of Grey § 1955

1955 Australian federal election: Grey
| Party | Candidate | Votes | % | ±% |
|---|---|---|---|---|
| Labor | Edgar Russell | 21,836 | 56.7 | −1.6 |
| Liberal | George Bockelberg | 16,646 | 43.3 | +1.6 |
| Total formal votes | | 38,482 | 97.6 | |
| Informal votes | | 959 | 2.4 | |
| Turnout | | 39,441 | 95.7 | |
| Labor hold | | Swing | −1.6 | |

=== Hindmarsh ===
This section is an excerpt from Electoral results for the Division of Hindmarsh § 1955

1955 Australian federal election: Hindmarsh
| Party | Candidate | Votes | % | ±% |
|---|---|---|---|---|
| Labor | Clyde Cameron | 23,828 | 60.2 | −39.8 |
| Liberal | Frank Potter | 12,189 | 30.8 | +30.8 |
| Labor (A-C) | Francis Moran | 3,532 | 8.9 | +8.9 |
| Total formal votes | | 39,549 | 95.6 | |
| Informal votes | | 1,736 | 4.2 | |
| Turnout | | 41,285 | 96.2 | |
Two-party-preferred result
| Labor | Clyde Cameron | | 62.0 | −38.0 |
| Liberal | Frank Potter | | 38.0 | +38.0 |
| Labor hold | | Swing | −38.0 | |

=== Kingston ===
This section is an excerpt from Electoral results for the Division of Kingston § 1955

1955 Australian federal election: Kingston
| Party | Candidate | Votes | % | ±% |
|---|---|---|---|---|
| Labor | Pat Galvin | 21,429 | 51.6 | −4.0 |
| Liberal | Jim Forbes | 20,129 | 48.4 | +4.0 |
| Total formal votes | | 41,558 | 96.7 | |
| Informal votes | | 1,414 | 3.3 | |
| Turnout | | 42,972 | 96.5 | |
| Labor hold | | Swing | −4.0 | |

=== Port Adelaide ===
This section is an excerpt from Electoral results for the Division of Port Adelaide § 1955

1955 Australian federal election: Port Adelaide
| Party | Candidate | Votes | % | ±% |
|---|---|---|---|---|
| Labor | Albert Thompson | 32,813 | 84.7 | −9.3 |
| Communist | Peter Symon | 5,918 | 15.3 | +9.3 |
| Total formal votes | | 38,731 | 93.0 | |
| Informal votes | | 2,906 | 7.0 | |
| Turnout | | 41,637 | 96.1 | |
| Labor hold | | Swing | −9.3 | |

=== Sturt ===
This section is an excerpt from Electoral results for the Division of Sturt § 1955

1955 Australian federal election: Sturt
| Party | Candidate | Votes | % | ±% |
|---|---|---|---|---|
| Liberal | Keith Wilson | 24,306 | 60.3 | +7.9 |
| Labor | Frederick Hansford | 16,022 | 39.7 | −7.9 |
| Total formal votes | | 40,328 | 96.1 | |
| Informal votes | | 1,637 | 3.9 | |
| Turnout | | 41,965 | 96.1 | |
| Liberal notional hold | | Swing | +7.9 | |

=== Wakefield ===
This section is an excerpt from Electoral results for the Division of Wakefield § 1955

1955 Australian federal election: Wakefield
| Party | Candidate | Votes | % | ±% |
|---|---|---|---|---|
| Liberal | Sir Philip McBride | 24,283 | 62.2 | +3.8 |
| Labor | Robert Bruce | 12,671 | 32.4 | −4.1 |
| Independent | Hector Henstridge | 2,095 | 5.4 | −0.4 |
| Total formal votes | | 39,049 | 96.9 | |
| Informal votes | | 1,232 | 3.1 | |
| Turnout | | 40,281 | 96.7 | |
Two-party-preferred result
| Liberal | Sir Philip McBride | | 64.9 | +2.7 |
| Labor | Robert Bruce | | 35.1 | −2.7 |
| Liberal hold | | Swing | +2.7 | |

== Western Australia ==
1955 Australian federal election (Western Australia)
| ← 1954 | 10 December 1955 | 1958 → |

All 9 WA seats in the House of Representatives 5 seats needed for a majority
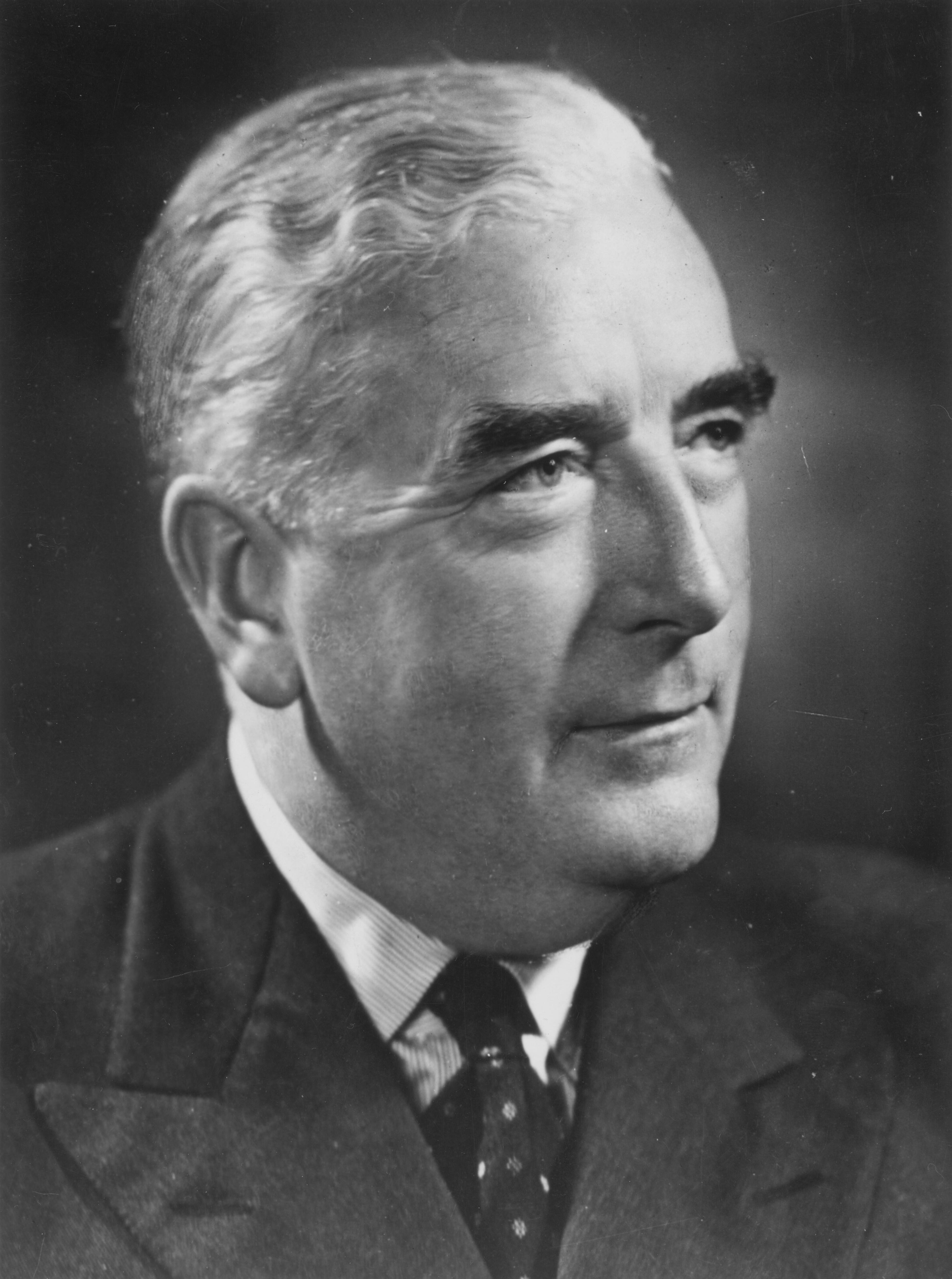

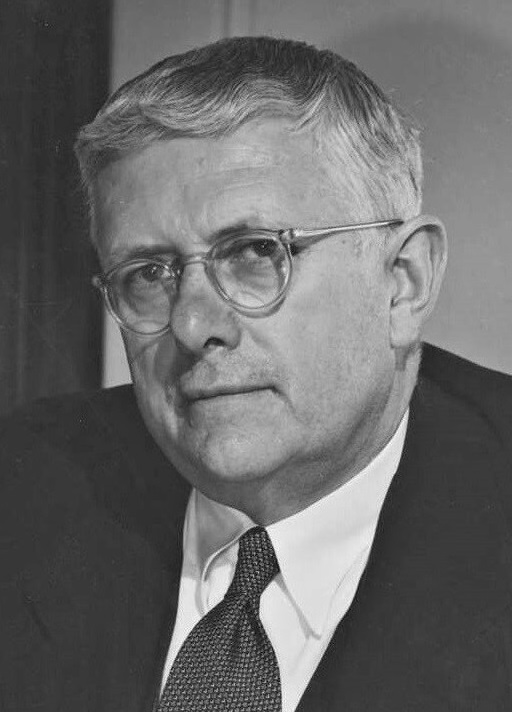
| | First party | Second party |
|---|---|---|
| Leader | Robert Menzies | H. V. Evatt |
| Party | Coalition | Labor |
| Seats before | 4 | 4 |
| Seats won | 6 | 3 |
| Seat change | ▲2 | ▼1 |
| TPP | 56.5% | 43.5% |
| TPP swing | ▲4.6pp | ▼4.6pp |

- The first-preference vote is not shown due to the fact that four seats in Western Australia were uncontested and won by the Coalition (the Liberal and Country Parties won two of these seats each). Thus, the Coalition is significantly underrepresented in the first-preference vote count.

=== Canning ===
This section is an excerpt from Electoral results for the Division of Canning § 1955

1955 Australian federal election: Canning
| Party | Candidate | Votes | % | ±% |
|---|---|---|---|---|
| Country | Len Hamilton | unopposed | | |
| Country hold | | Swing | | |

=== Curtin ===
This section is an excerpt from Electoral results for the Division of Curtin § 1955

1955 Australian federal election: Curtin
| Party | Candidate | Votes | % | ±% |
|---|---|---|---|---|
| Liberal | Paul Hasluck | unopposed | | |
| Liberal hold | | Swing | | |

=== Forrest ===
This section is an excerpt from Electoral results for the Division of Forrest § 1955

1955 Australian federal election: Forrest
| Party | Candidate | Votes | % | ±% |
|---|---|---|---|---|
| Liberal | Gordon Freeth | unopposed | | |
| Liberal hold | | Swing | | |

=== Fremantle ===
This section is an excerpt from Electoral results for the Division of Fremantle § 1955

1955 Australian federal election: Fremantle
| Party | Candidate | Votes | % | ±% |
|---|---|---|---|---|
| Labor | Kim Beazley Sr. | 22,011 | 57.1 | −0.5 |
| Liberal | Vernon Hubbard | 15,336 | 39.8 | −0.9 |
| Communist | Paddy Troy | 1,231 | 3.2 | +1.4 |
| Total formal votes | | 38,578 | 97.2 | |
| Informal votes | | 1,111 | 2.8 | |
| Turnout | | 39,689 | 96.2 | |
Two-party-preferred result
| Labor | Kim Beazley Sr. | | 60.0 | +0.9 |
| Liberal | Vernon Hubbard | | 40.0 | −0.9 |
| Labor hold | | Swing | +0.9 | |

=== Kalgoorlie ===
This section is an excerpt from Electoral results for the Division of Kalgoorlie § 1955

1955 Australian federal election: Kalgoorlie
| Party | Candidate | Votes | % | ±% |
|---|---|---|---|---|
| Labor | Herbert Johnson | 17,033 | 61.1 | −4.5 |
| Independent | Harold Illingworth | 10,844 | 38.9 | +4.5 |
| Total formal votes | | 27,877 | 96.3 | |
| Informal votes | | 1,067 | 3.7 | |
| Turnout | | 28,944 | 93.2 | |
| Labor hold | | Swing | −1.8 | |

=== Moore ===
This section is an excerpt from Electoral results for the Division of Moore § 1955

1955 Australian federal election: Moore
| Party | Candidate | Votes | % | ±% |
|---|---|---|---|---|
| Country | Hugh Leslie | unopposed | | |
| Country hold | | Swing | | |

=== Perth ===
This section is an excerpt from Electoral results for the Division of Perth § 1955

1955 Australian federal election: Perth
| Party | Candidate | Votes | % | ±% |
|---|---|---|---|---|
| Liberal | Fred Chaney Sr. | 17,575 | 51.5 | +4.6 |
| Labor | Tom Burke | 16,536 | 48.5 | −2.4 |
| Total formal votes | | 34,111 | 96.8 | |
| Informal votes | | 1,142 | 3.2 | |
| Turnout | | 35,253 | 94.4 | |
| Liberal gain from Labor | | Swing | +3.8 | |

=== Stirling ===
This section is an excerpt from Electoral results for the Division of Stirling § 1955

1955 Australian federal election: Stirling
| Party | Candidate | Votes | % | ±% |
|---|---|---|---|---|
| Labor | Harry Webb | 19,257 | 52.8 | −0.4 |
| Liberal | Frederick Payne | 17,206 | 47.2 | +0.4 |
| Total formal votes | | 36,463 | 95.6 | |
| Informal votes | | 1,672 | 4.4 | |
| Turnout | | 38,135 | 95.3 | |
| Labor notional hold | | Swing | −0.4 | |

=== Swan ===
This section is an excerpt from Electoral results for the Division of Swan § 1955

1955 Australian federal election: Swan
| Party | Candidate | Votes | % | ±% |
|---|---|---|---|---|
| Liberal | Richard Cleaver | 22,268 | 57.7 | +6.9 |
| Labor | Thomas Williams | 16,314 | 42.3 | −6.9 |
| Total formal votes | | 38,582 | 96.4 | |
| Informal votes | | 1,439 | 3.6 | |
| Turnout | | 40,021 | 95.7 | |
| Liberal hold | | Swing | +6.9 | |

== Tasmania ==
1955 Australian federal election (Tasmania)
| ← 1954 | 10 December 1955 | 1958 → |

All 5 Tasmanian seats in the House of Representatives 3 seats needed for a majority
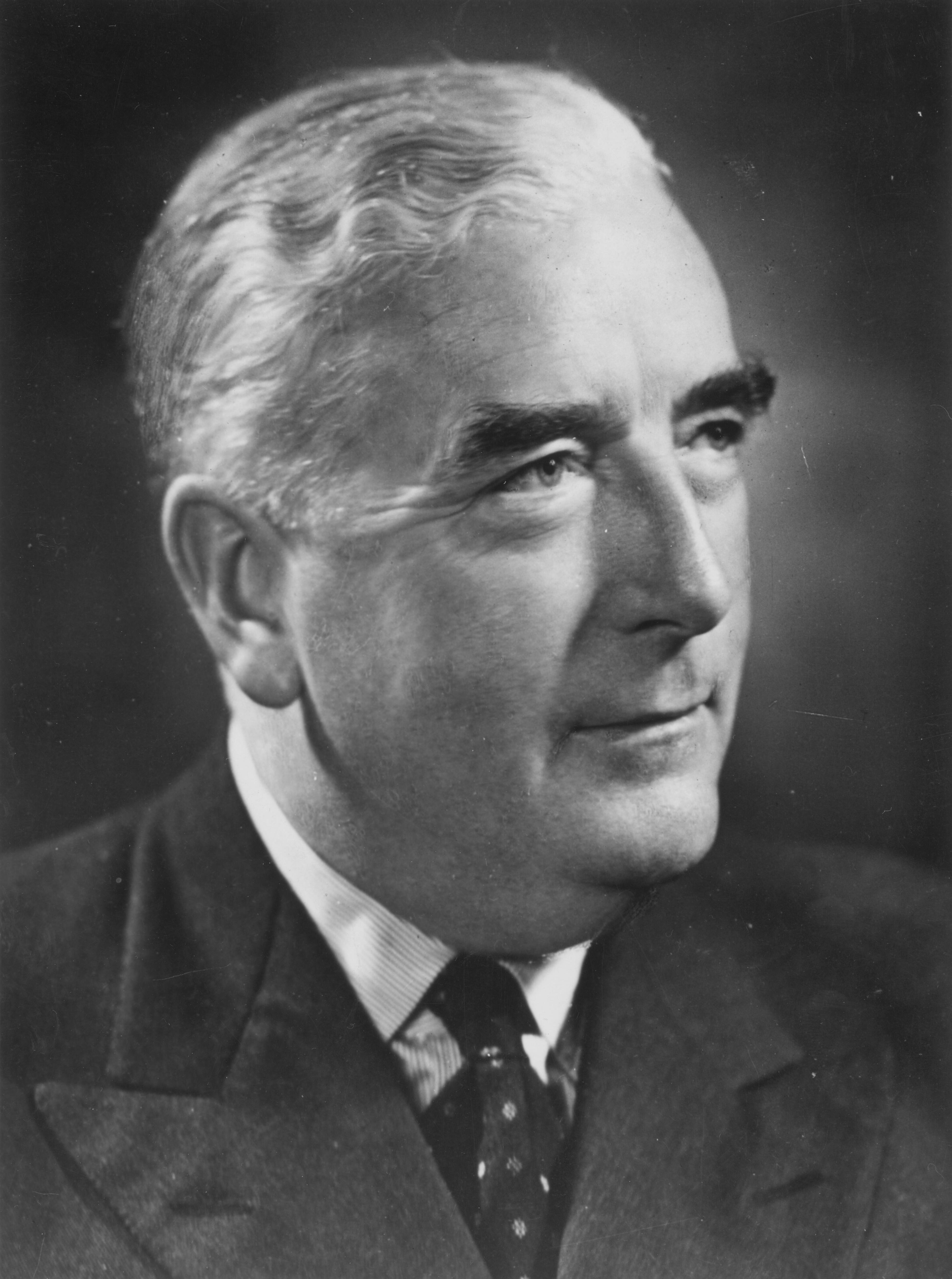

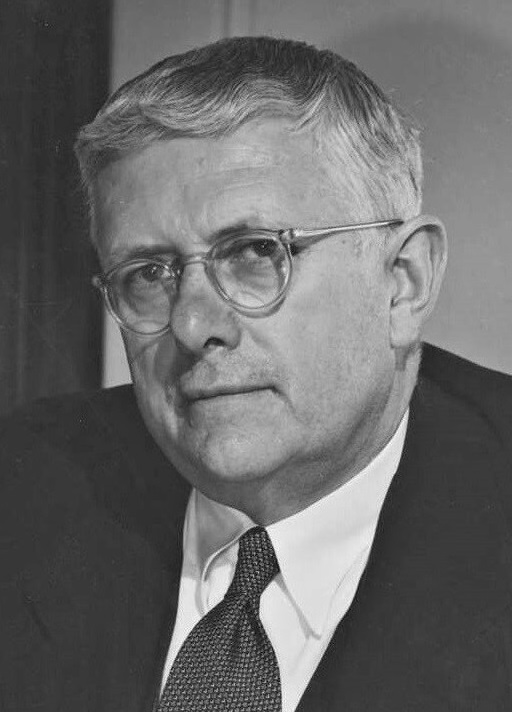
| | First party | Second party |
|---|---|---|
| Leader | Robert Menzies | H. V. Evatt |
| Party | Coalition | Labor |
| Seats before | 3 | 2 |
| Seats won | 3 | 2 |
| Seat change | Steady | Steady |
| Popular vote | 78,674 | 73,273 |
| Percentage | 49.1% | 45.8% |
| Swing | ▼0.9pp | ▼3.8pp |
| TPP | 52.5% | 47.5% |
| TPP swing | ▲2.5pp | ▼2.5pp |

=== Bass ===
This section is an excerpt from Electoral results for the Division of Bass § 1955

1955 Australian federal election: Bass
| Party | Candidate | Votes | % | ±% |
|---|---|---|---|---|
| Labor | Lance Barnard | 18,197 | 55.5 | +4.5 |
| Liberal | Frederick White | 12,009 | 36.6 | −12.4 |
| Labor (A-C) | Leslie Duke | 2,589 | 7.9 | +7.9 |
| Total formal votes | | 32,795 | 96.2 | |
| Informal votes | | 1,291 | 3.8 | |
| Turnout | | 34,086 | 96.5 | |
Two-party-preferred result
| Labor | Lance Barnard | | 57.1 | +6.1 |
| Liberal | Frederick White | | 42.9 | −6.1 |
| Labor hold | | Swing | +6.1 | |

=== Braddon ===
This section is an excerpt from Electoral results for the Division of Braddon § 1955

1955 Australian federal election: Braddon
| Party | Candidate | Votes | % | ±% |
|---|---|---|---|---|
| Liberal | Aubrey Luck | 18,590 | 58.9 | +8.4 |
| Labor | Reg Murray | 12,990 | 41.1 | −8.4 |
| Total formal votes | | 31,580 | 96.1 | |
| Informal votes | | 1,279 | 3.9 | |
| Turnout | | 32,859 | 96.1 | |
| Liberal notional hold | | Swing | +8.4 | |

=== Denison ===
This section is an excerpt from Electoral results for the Division of Denison § 1955

1955 Australian federal election: Denison
| Party | Candidate | Votes | % | ±% |
|---|---|---|---|---|
| Liberal | Athol Townley | 20,058 | 57.5 | +4.7 |
| Labor | Brian Miller | 12,828 | 36.8 | −8.6 |
| Communist | Max Bound | 2,003 | 5.7 | +3.8 |
| Total formal votes | | 34,889 | 95.1 | |
| Informal votes | | 1,807 | 4.9 | |
| Turnout | | 36,696 | 95.3 | |
Two-party-preferred result
| Liberal | Athol Townley | | 58.1 | +5.3 |
| Labor | Brian Miller | | 41.9 | −5.3 |
| Liberal hold | | Swing | +5.3 | |

=== Franklin ===
This section is an excerpt from Electoral results for the Division of Franklin § 1955

1955 Australian federal election: Franklin
| Party | Candidate | Votes | % | ±% |
|---|---|---|---|---|
| Liberal | Bill Falkinder | 15,471 | 53.6 | −0.6 |
| Labor | Brian Crawford | 11,652 | 40.3 | −5.4 |
| Labor (A-C) | Henry Roberts | 1,757 | 6.1 | +6.1 |
| Total formal votes | | 28,880 | 95.3 | |
| Informal votes | | 1,424 | 4.7 | |
| Turnout | | 30,304 | 97.1 | |
Two-party-preferred result
| Liberal | Bill Falkinder | | 58.5 | +4.3 |
| Labor | Brian Crawford | | 41.5 | −4.3 |
| Liberal hold | | Swing | +4.3 | |

=== Wilmot ===
This section is an excerpt from Electoral results for the Division of Wilmot § 1955

1955 Australian federal election: Wilmot
| Party | Candidate | Votes | % | ±% |
|---|---|---|---|---|
| Labor | Gil Duthie | 17,606 | 55.0 | −1.4 |
| Liberal | Robert Bethell | 12,546 | 39.2 | −4.4 |
| Labor (A-C) | Owen Doherty | 1,834 | 5.7 | +5.7 |
| Total formal votes | | 31,986 | 96.3 | |
| Informal votes | | 1,238 | 3.7 | |
| Turnout | | 33,224 | 96.5 | |
Two-party-preferred result
| Labor | Gil Duthie | | 56.1 | −0.3 |
| Liberal | Robert Bethell | | 43.9 | +0.3 |
| Labor hold | | Swing | −0.3 | |

== Territories ==
=== Australian Capital Territory ===
1955 Australian federal election (Australian Capital Territory)
| ← 1954 | 10 December 1955 | 1958 → |

Division of Australian Capital Territory
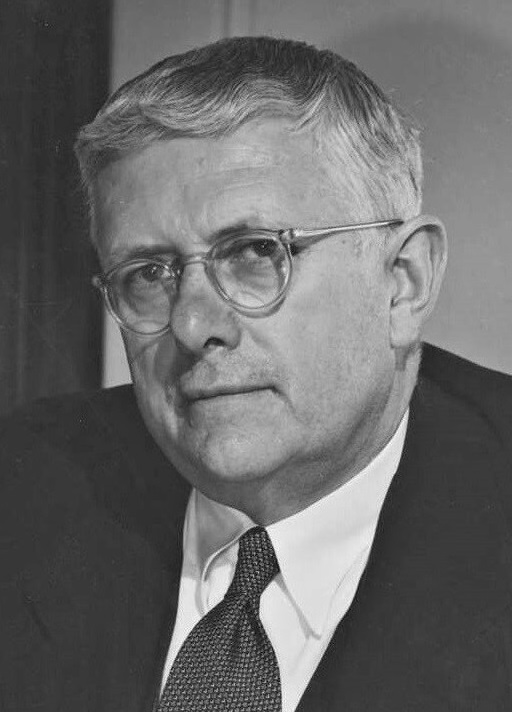

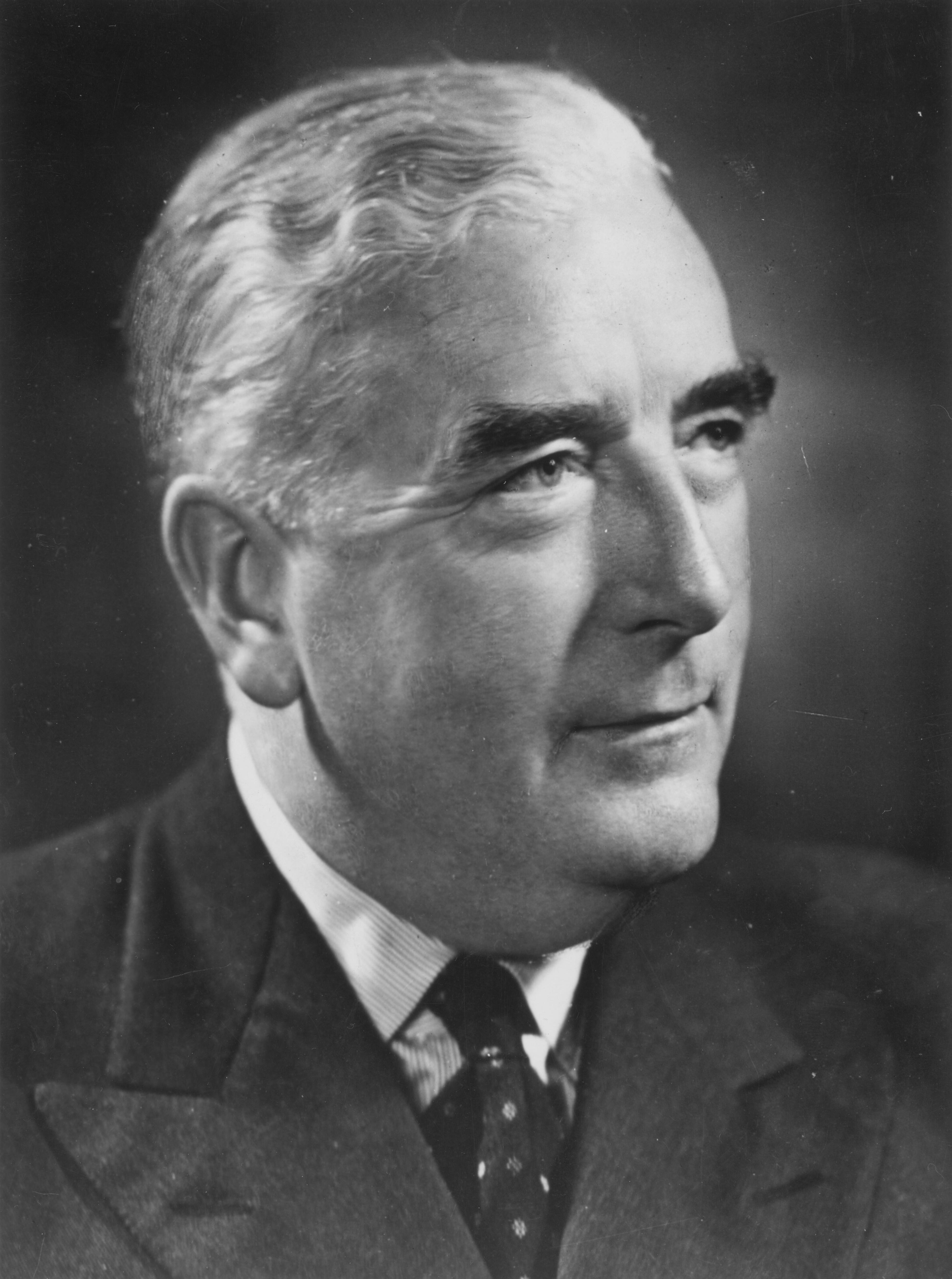
| | First party | Second party |
|---|---|---|
| Leader | H. V. Evatt | Robert Menzies |
| Party | Labor | Coalition |
| Seats before | 1 | 0 |
| Seats won | 1 | 0 |
| Seat change | Steady | Steady |
| Popular vote | 9,588 | 5,263 |
| Percentage | 64.6% | 35.4% |
| Swing | ▲1.9pp | ▲1.0pp |

This section is an excerpt from Electoral results for the Division of Australian Capital Territory § 1955

1955 Australian federal election: Australian Capital Territory
| Party | Candidate | Votes | % | ±% |
|---|---|---|---|---|
| Labor | Jim Fraser | 9,588 | 64.6 | +1.9 |
| Liberal | Robert Greenish | 5,263 | 35.4 | +1.0 |
| Total formal votes | | 14,851 | 99.2 | |
| Informal votes | | 126 | 0.8 | |
| Turnout | | 14,977 | 92.6 | |
| Labor hold | | Swing | −0.3 | |

=== Northern Territory ===
This section is an excerpt from Electoral results for the Division of Northern Territory § 1955

1955 Australian federal election: Northern Territory
| Party | Candidate | Votes | % | ±% |
|---|---|---|---|---|
| Labor | Jock Nelson | unopposed | | |
| Labor hold | | Swing | | |

== See also ==
- Candidates of the 1955 Australian federal election
- Members of the Australian House of Representatives, 1955–1958
