= Electoral results for the Division of Darebin =

Australian division election results

This is a list of electoral results for the Division of Darebin in Australian federal elections from the division's creation in 1949 until its abolition in 1969.

== Members ==
| Member | Party | Term |
|---|---|---|
| Tom Andrews | Labor | 1949–1955 |
| Tom Andrews | Labor (A-C) | 1955 |
| Robert Holt | Labor | 1955–1958 |
| Frank Courtnay | Labor | 1958–1969 |

== Election results ==
=== Elections in the 1960s ===
==== 1966 ====
1966 Australian federal election: Darebin
| Party | Candidate | Votes | % | ±% |
|---|---|---|---|---|
| Labor | Frank Courtnay | 25,325 | 49.5 | −5.9 |
| Liberal | Noel Stubbs | 15,601 | 30.5 | +4.0 |
| Democratic Labor | Tom Andrews | 10,232 | 20.0 | +1.8 |
| Total formal votes | | 51,158 | 96.1 | |
| Informal votes | | 2,073 | 3.9 | |
| Turnout | | 53,231 | 96.1 | |
Two-party-preferred result
| Labor | Frank Courtnay | 29,258 | 57.2 | +0.1 |
| Liberal | Noel Stubbs | 21,900 | 42.8 | −0.1 |
| Labor hold | | Swing | +0.1 | |

==== 1963 ====
1963 Australian federal election: Darebin
| Party | Candidate | Votes | % | ±% |
|---|---|---|---|---|
| Labor | Frank Courtnay | 28,610 | 55.4 | +0.2 |
| Liberal | Peter Coupe | 13,688 | 26.5 | +4.6 |
| Democratic Labor | Tom Andrews | 9,388 | 18.2 | −4.7 |
| Total formal votes | | 51,686 | 98.4 | |
| Informal votes | | 862 | 1.6 | |
| Turnout | | 52,548 | 96.7 | |
Two-party-preferred result
| Labor | Frank Courtnay | | 57.1 | −0.3 |
| Liberal | Peter Coupe | | 42.9 | +42.9 |
| Labor hold | | Swing | −0.3 | |

==== 1961 ====
1961 Australian federal election: Darebin
| Party | Candidate | Votes | % | ±% |
|---|---|---|---|---|
| Labor | Frank Courtnay | 28,285 | 55.2 | +4.1 |
| Democratic Labor | Tom Andrews | 11,767 | 22.9 | −0.8 |
| Liberal | John Wyss | 11,228 | 21.9 | −3.2 |
| Total formal votes | | 51,280 | 97.7 | |
| Informal votes | | 1,207 | 2.3 | |
| Turnout | | 52,487 | 95.9 | |
Two-party-preferred result
| Labor | Frank Courtnay | | 57.4 | +3.0 |
| Democratic Labor | Tom Andrews | | 42.6 | +42.6 |
| Labor hold | | Swing | +3.0 | |

=== Elections in the 1950s ===
==== 1958 ====
1958 Australian federal election: Darebin
| Party | Candidate | Votes | % | ±% |
|---|---|---|---|---|
| Labor | Frank Courtnay | 25,213 | 51.1 | +3.2 |
| Liberal | Gordon Duncan | 12,400 | 25.1 | −1.9 |
| Democratic Labor | Tom Andrews | 11,710 | 23.7 | −1.4 |
| Total formal votes | | 49,323 | 97.6 | |
| Informal votes | | 1,189 | 2.4 | |
| Turnout | | 50,512 | 96.5 | |
Two-party-preferred result
| Labor | Frank Courtnay | | 54.4 | −4.4 |
| Liberal | Gordon Duncan | | 45.6 | +4.4 |
| Labor hold | | Swing | −4.4 | |

==== 1955 ====
1955 Australian federal election: Darebin
| Party | Candidate | Votes | % | ±% |
|---|---|---|---|---|
| Labor | Robert Holt | 20,323 | 47.9 | −16.1 |
| Liberal | Charles White | 11,481 | 27.0 | −9.0 |
| Labor (A-C) | Tom Andrews | 10,660 | 25.1 | +25.1 |
| Total formal votes | | 42,464 | 97.5 | |
| Informal votes | | 1,104 | 2.5 | |
| Turnout | | 43,568 | 95.4 | |
Two-party-preferred result
| Labor | Robert Holt | 24,948 | 58.8 | −5.2 |
| Liberal | Charles White | 17,516 | 41.2 | +5.2 |
| Labor hold | | Swing | −5.2 | |

==== 1954 ====
1954 Australian federal election: Darebin
| Party | Candidate | Votes | % | ±% |
|---|---|---|---|---|
| Labor | Tom Andrews | 28,810 | 65.0 | +0.6 |
| Liberal | Charles White | 15,534 | 35.0 | −0.6 |
| Total formal votes | | 44,344 | 98.7 | |
| Informal votes | | 598 | 1.3 | |
| Turnout | | 44,942 | 96.7 | |
| Labor hold | | Swing | +0.6 | |

==== 1951 ====
1951 Australian federal election: Darebin
| Party | Candidate | Votes | % | ±% |
|---|---|---|---|---|
| Labor | Tom Andrews | 26,412 | 64.4 | +1.7 |
| Liberal | Gordon Savage | 14,572 | 35.6 | −1.7 |
| Total formal votes | | 40,984 | 98.6 | |
| Informal votes | | 581 | 1.4 | |
| Turnout | | 41,565 | 96.9 | |
| Labor hold | | Swing | +1.7 | |

=== Elections in the 1940s ===
==== 1949 ====
1949 Australian federal election: Darebin
| Party | Candidate | Votes | % | ±% |
|---|---|---|---|---|
| Labor | Tom Andrews | 24,719 | 62.7 | +4.1 |
| Liberal | Jack McColl | 14,688 | 37.3 | +5.9 |
| Total formal votes | | 39,407 | 98.4 | |
| Informal votes | | 655 | 1.6 | |
| Turnout | | 40,062 | 97.1 | |
| Labor notional hold | | Swing | −2.7 | |
