= Frank Courtnay =

Australian politician

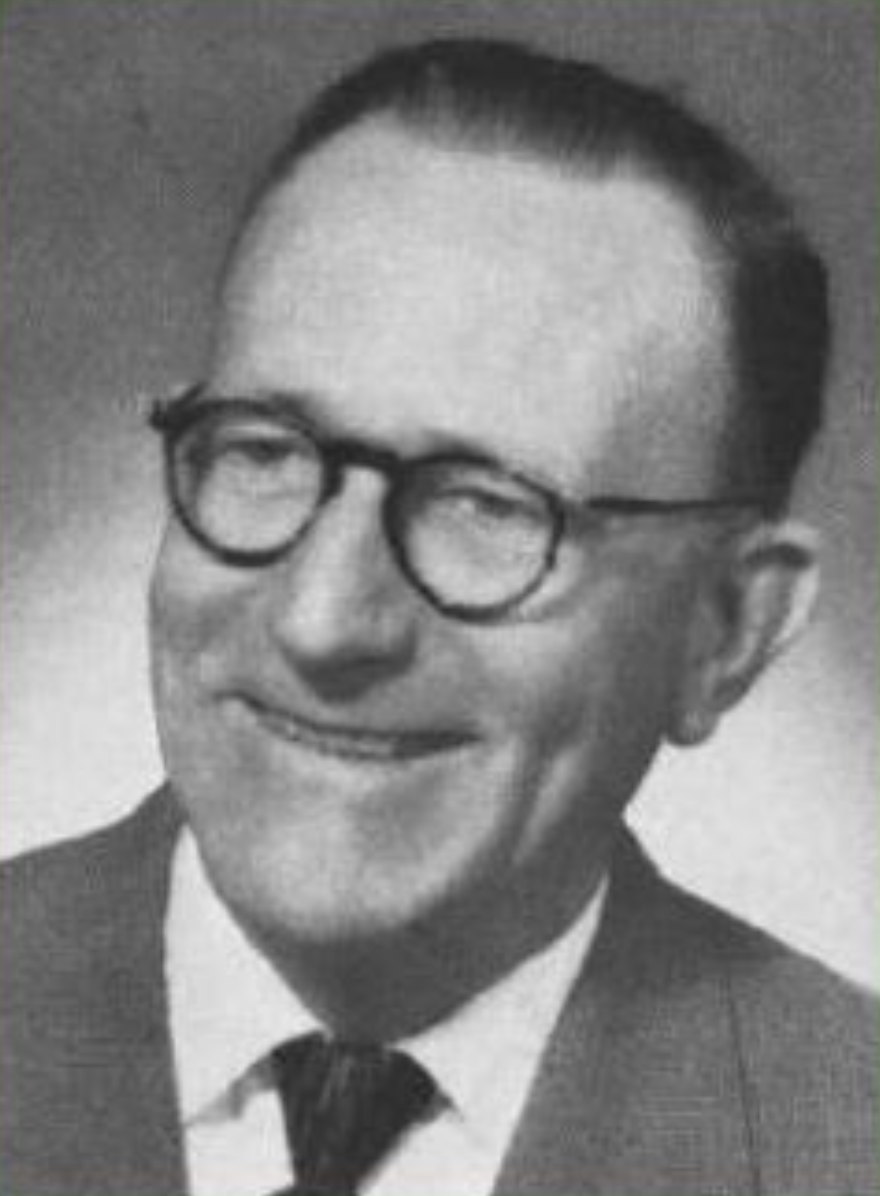

Member of the Australian Parliament for Darebin
- In office 22 November 1958 – 29 September 1969
- Preceded by: Robert Holt
- Succeeded by: Division abolished

Personal details
- Born: 6 June 1903 Melbourne, Victoria
- Died: 31 March 1980 (aged 76)
- Party: Australian Labor Party
- Occupation: Plumber

Frank Courtnay (6 June 1903 – 31 March 1980) was an Australian politician. Born in Melbourne, he was educated at state schools and then the Working Men's College before becoming a dairy farmer and later a plumber. He was Victorian and then national secretary of the Plumbers and Gasfitters Employees Union of Australia. In 1958, he was elected to the Australian House of Representatives as the Labor member for Darebin. He held Darebin until its abolition in 1969, at which point he retired. Courtnay died in 1980.

Parliament of Australia
Preceded by Robert Holt	Member for Darebin; 1958 – 1969	Succeeded by Division abolished
