= Tom Andrews (Australian politician) =

Australian politician (1900–1974)

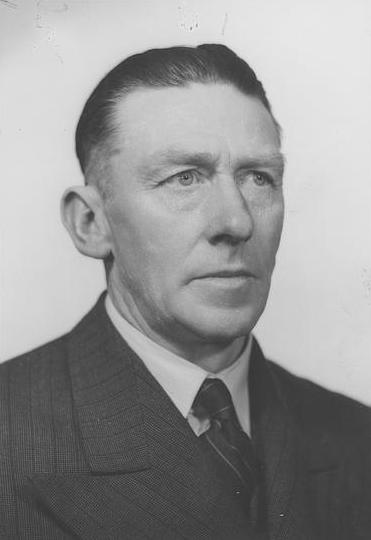

Member of the Australian Parliament for Darebin
- In office 10 December 1949 – 10 December 1955
- Preceded by: New seat
- Succeeded by: Robert Holt

Personal details
- Born: 19 October 1900 Kalino, Victoria
- Died: 21 November 1974 (aged 74)
- Party: Democratic Labor Party (1955-1974)
- Other political affiliations: Labor (1949–1955)
- Occupation: Teacher

Thomas William Andrews (19 October 1900 – 21 November 1974) was an Australian politician. Born in Kalino, Victoria, he was educated at state schools in Ballarat. From 1917 to 1949 he was a teacher in state schools, as well as an official with the Teachers' Union. He sat on Preston City Council and was a member of the 1947 Royal Commission on Victorian Education. In 1949, he was elected to the Australian House of Representatives as the Labor member for Darebin.

In 1955, Andrews was expelled from the Labor Party and, together with six other MPs, formed the Australian Labor Party (Anti-Communist), precursor to the Democratic Labor Party. He went on to lose the seat of Darebin at the subsequent federal election, held the same year.

Andrews would go on to contest the division of Darebin and its successor Scullin for the Democratic Labor Party at every Federal election between 1958 and 1972. Andrews died in 1974.

Parliament of Australia
Preceded by New seat	Member for Darebin; 1949 – 1955	Succeeded by Robert Holt
