= Division of Darebin =

Former Australian federal electoral division

Darebin Australian House of Representatives Division
- Created: 1949
- Abolished: 1969
- Namesake: Darebin Creek

The Division of Darebin was an Australian Electoral Division in Victoria. The division was created in 1949, and was named for the Darebin Creek. It was a fairly safe seat for the Australian Labor Party.

The division was located in the northern suburbs of Melbourne, initially including Preston, Reservoir, Thornbury and what was later Kingsbury. It replaced the northern two-thirds of Division of Batman, with the exception of the area that would later became La Trobe University. During its 20 years of existence, the division only had one boundary change in 1955, when it was expanded eastwards to gain the Heidelberg area from the Division of Deakin and losing Thornbury to the Division of Batman.

The seat was abolished in 1969, and largely replaced by the Division of Scullin which covered a similar area until 1977. Those areas then became part of Division of Batman again, and then the Division of Cooper since 2018.

== Members ==
Image	Member	Party	Term	Notes
	Tom Andrews (1900–1974)	Labor	10 December 1949 – April 1955	Lost seat
	Tom Andrews (1900–1974)	Labor (Anti-Communist)	April 1955 – 10 December 1955	Lost seat
	Robert Holt (1913–1985)	Labor	10 December 1955 – 14 October 1958	Previously held the Victorian Legislative Assembly seat of Portland. Retired
	Frank Courtnay (1903–1980)	Labor	22 November 1958 – 29 September 1969	Retired after Darebin was abolished in 1969
