= Robert Holt (politician) =

Australian politician (1913–1985)

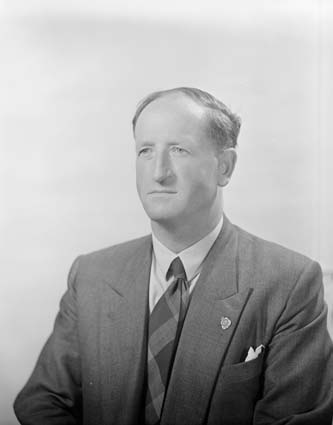

Member of the Australian Parliament for Darebin
- In office 10 December 1955 – 14 October 1958
- Preceded by: Tom Andrews
- Succeeded by: Frank Courtnay

Personal details
- Born: 9 June 1913 Launceston, Tasmania
- Died: 1 May 1985 (aged 70) Montrose, Victoria, Australia
- Party: Australian Labor Party
- Education: University of Melbourne
- Profession: Barrister

Robert Wilfred Holt (9 June 1913 – 1 May 1985) was an Australian politician, a member of the Victorian Legislative Assembly and, later, of the Parliament of Australia.

Born in Launceston, Tasmania, Holt was educated in Melbourne at Scotch College and the University of Melbourne. He became a barrister in 1940. In 1945, he was elected to the Victorian Legislative Assembly as the Labor member for Portland. He was defeated in 1947, but re-elected in 1950. He was Minister for Lands and Social Settlement from 1952 to 1953, in the government of John Cain (Senior).

In 1955, Holt transferred to federal politics, winning the Australian House of Representatives seat of Darebin. Just three years later, in 1958, he retired from politics due to ill health. He was elected president of the Victorian branch of the Labor Party in 1962, but lost the presidency three years later, after criticising the branch and its poor electoral performance. Citing undue union control, he resigned from the party in 1973, saying he would vote Liberal and might join the Australia Party.

Holt died in 1985.

Victorian Legislative Assembly
New title	Member for Portland; 1945–1947	Succeeded by Harry Hedditch
Preceded by Harry Hedditch	Member for Portland; 1950–1955	Succeeded by George Gibbs
Parliament of Australia
Preceded by Tom Andrews	Member for Darebin; 1955–1958	Succeeded by Frank Courtnay
