= Electoral results for the Division of Kalgoorlie =

This is a list of electoral results for the Division of Kalgoorlie in Australian federal elections from the division's creation in 1901 until its abolition in 2010.

== Members ==
Member	Party	Term
John Kirwan	Free Trade	1901–1903
Charlie Frazer	Labor	1903–1913
Hugh Mahon	Labor	1913 by–1917
Edward Heitmann	Nationalist	1917–1919
Hugh Mahon	Labor	1919–1920
George Foley	Nationalist	1920 by–1922
Albert Green	Labor	1922–1940
Herbert Johnson	Labor	1940 by–1958
Peter Browne	Liberal	1958–1961
Fred Collard	Labor	1961–1975
Mick Cotter	Liberal	1975–1980
Graeme Campbell	Labor	1980–1995
Graeme Campbell	Independent	1995–1996
Graeme Campbell	Australia First	1996–1998
Barry Haase	Liberal	1998–2010

== Election results ==
=== Elections in the 2000s ===
==== 2007 ====
2007 Australian federal election: Kalgoorlie
Party	Candidate	Votes	%	±%
Liberal	Barry Haase	31,565	48.14	+2.68
Labor	Sharon Thiel	26,653	40.65	+8.73
Greens	Robin Chapple	4,045	6.17	−0.16
One Nation	Derek Major	1,075	1.64	−0.69
Christian Democrats	Ross Patterson	962	1.47	+0.19
Family First	Ian Rose	820	1.25	+1.25
Citizens Electoral Council	Ian Burt	275	0.42	−0.07
Liberty & Democracy	Charles Dalton	176	0.28	+0.27
Total formal votes		65,571	95.93	+1.27
Informal votes		2,785	4.07	−1.27
Turnout		68,356	84.63	+1.10
Two-party-preferred result
Liberal	Barry Haase	34,474	52.58	−3.72
Labor	Sharon Thiel	31,097	47.42	+3.72
Liberal hold		Swing	−3.72	

==== 2004 ====
2004 Australian federal election: Kalgoorlie
Party	Candidate	Votes	%	±%
Liberal	Barry Haase	29,475	45.46	+2.86
Labor	Tom Stephens	20,691	31.92	−3.14
Independent	Graeme Campbell	6,654	10.26	+10.26
Greens	Kado Muir	4,101	6.33	+2.55
One Nation	Robin Scott	1,511	2.33	−6.27
Christian Democrats	Craig Hendry	827	1.28	+1.28
Independent	Brendon Cook	506	0.78	+0.78
Democrats	Don Hoddy	496	0.77	−2.75
Citizens Electoral Council	Lorraine Thomas	318	0.49	+0.33
Independent	Nabil Haji Rowland	252	0.39	+0.39
Total formal votes		64,831	94.66	+0.26
Informal votes		3,656	5.34	−0.26
Turnout		68,487	83.53	−3.28
Two-party-preferred result
Liberal	Barry Haase	36,502	56.30	+1.96
Labor	Tom Stephens	28,329	43.70	−1.96
Liberal hold		Swing	+1.96	

==== 2001 ====
2001 Australian federal election: Kalgoorlie
Party	Candidate	Votes	%	±%
Liberal	Barry Haase	28,810	42.60	+14.57
Labor	Paul Browning	23,712	35.06	+7.44
One Nation	Robin Scott	5,818	8.60	+0.21
Greens	Laurie Miller	2,554	3.78	−0.46
Democrats	Don Hoddy	2,383	3.52	+1.52
Independent	Clark Butson	1,947	2.88	+2.88
National	Peter McCumstie	1,379	2.04	−3.94
Independent	Neville Smith	474	0.70	+0.70
Curtin Labor Alliance	Ian Burt	447	0.66	+0.66
Citizens Electoral Council	Callum Payne	111	0.16	−0.11
Total formal votes		67,635	94.40	−0.95
Informal votes		4,010	5.60	+0.95
Turnout		71,645	86.84	
Two-party-preferred result
Liberal	Barry Haase	36,755	54.34	+2.24
Labor	Paul Browning	30,880	45.66	−2.24
Liberal hold		Swing	+2.24	

=== Elections in the 1990s ===
==== 1998 ====
1998 Australian federal election: Kalgoorlie
Party	Candidate	Votes	%	±%
Liberal	Barry Haase	19,169	28.03	+1.43
Labor	Clark Butson	18,890	27.62	−6.11
Australia First	Graeme Campbell	15,585	22.79	+22.79
One Nation	Neville Smith	5,737	8.39	+8.39
National	Kathy Finlayson	4,088	5.98	+4.78
Greens	Robin Chapple	2,899	4.24	+0.51
Democrats	Dean Richter	1,367	2.00	−0.18
Christian Democrats	Laurie Sugg	466	0.68	+0.68
Citizens Electoral Council	Ian Burt	185	0.27	+0.27
Total formal votes		68,386	95.35	−1.87
Informal votes		3,335	4.65	+1.87
Turnout		71,721	86.97	−1.86
Two-party-preferred result
Liberal	Barry Haase	35,632	52.10	+2.80
Labor	Clark Butson	32,754	47.90	−2.80
Liberal gain from Independent		Swing	+2.80	

==== 1996 ====
1996 Australian federal election: Kalgoorlie
Party	Candidate	Votes	%	±%
Independent	Graeme Campbell	21,895	35.13	+35.13
Labor	Ian Taylor	21,648	34.73	−19.63
Liberal	Cedric Wyatt	15,144	24.30	−10.32
Greens	Deborah Botica	2,324	3.73	−0.45
Democrats	David Thackrah	1,318	2.11	−0.53
Total formal votes		62,329	97.23	−0.19
Informal votes		1,777	2.77	+0.19
Turnout		64,106	88.83	−0.89
Notional two-party-preferred count
Labor	Ian Taylor	33,130	53.36	−6.59
Liberal	Cedric Wyatt	28,960	46.64	+6.59
Two-candidate-preferred result
Independent	Graeme Campbell	37,536	60.35	+60.35
Labor	Ian Taylor	24,666	39.65	−20.24
Member changed to Independent from Labor				

==== 1993 ====
1993 Australian federal election: Kalgoorlie
Party	Candidate	Votes	%	±%
Labor	Graeme Campbell	35,187	54.36	+4.88
Liberal	Don Green	22,406	34.61	+2.42
Greens	Robin Chapple	2,702	4.17	−2.14
Independent	James O'Kenny	2,001	3.09	+3.09
Democrats	Shyama Peebles	1,713	2.65	−5.37
Natural Law	Byron Rigby	723	1.12	+1.12
Total formal votes		64,732	97.42	+1.01
Informal votes		1,713	2.58	−1.01
Turnout		66,445	89.72	
Two-party-preferred result
Labor	Graeme Campbell	38,770	59.94	−0.29
Liberal	Don Green	25,907	40.06	+0.29
Labor hold		Swing	−0.29	

==== 1990 ====
1990 Australian federal election: Kalgoorlie
Party	Candidate	Votes	%	±%
Labor	Graeme Campbell	29,883	49.5	−4.9
Liberal	Louie Carnicelli	19,441	32.2	−3.3
Democrats	Vin Cooper	4,839	8.0	+3.6
Greens	Robin Chapple	3,815	6.3	+6.3
National	Dascia Weckert	1,810	3.0	−2.7
Grey Power	Josh Sacino	606	1.0	+1.0
Total formal votes		60,394	96.4	
Informal votes		2,248	3.6	
Turnout		62,642	89.1	
Two-party-preferred result
Labor	Graeme Campbell	36,326	60.2	+1.7
Liberal	Louie Carnicelli	23,980	39.8	−1.7
Labor hold		Swing	+1.7	

=== Elections in the 1980s ===
==== 1987 ====
1987 Australian federal election: Kalgoorlie
Party	Candidate	Votes	%	±%
Labor	Graeme Campbell	30,841	52.6	+1.3
Liberal	David Johnston	21,850	37.3	−3.6
National	Ron Smales	3,363	5.7	+5.7
Democrats	Frank Chulung	2,593	4.4	+1.4
Total formal votes		58,647	93.8	
Informal votes		3,899	6.2	
Turnout		62,546	88.3	
Two-party-preferred result
Labor	Graeme Campbell	33,223	56.7	+0.7
Liberal	David Johnston	25,420	43.3	−0.7
Labor hold		Swing	+0.7	

==== 1984 ====
1984 Australian federal election: Kalgoorlie
Party	Candidate	Votes	%	±%
Labor	Graeme Campbell	27,903	51.3	−3.8
Liberal	Douglas Krepp	22,241	40.9	+1.9
Nuclear Disarmament	David Nourish	2,623	4.8	+4.8
Democrats	William Mason	1,649	3.0	+0.0
Total formal votes		54,416	92.4	
Informal votes		4,485	7.6	
Turnout		58,901	87.3	
Two-party-preferred result
Labor	Graeme Campbell	30,476	56.0	−2.0
Liberal	Douglas Krepp	23,940	44.0	+2.0
Labor hold		Swing	−2.0	

==== 1983 ====
1983 Australian federal election: Kalgoorlie
Party	Candidate	Votes	%	±%
Labor	Graeme Campbell	34,843	56.6	+11.4
Liberal	Douglas Krepp	23,069	37.5	−9.0
Democrats	Blair Nancarrow	1,856	3.0	−5.3
Independent	Joseph Boschetti	1,778	2.9	+2.9
Total formal votes		61,546	97.7	
Informal votes		1,459	2.3	
Turnout		63,005	86.0	
Two-party-preferred result
Labor	Graeme Campbell		59.5	+8.9
Liberal	Douglas Krepp		40.5	−8.9
Labor hold		Swing	+8.9	

==== 1980 ====
1980 Australian federal election: Kalgoorlie
Party	Candidate	Votes	%	±%
Liberal	Mick Cotter	26,562	46.5	−1.8
Labor	Graeme Campbell	25,845	45.2	+6.8
Democrats	Trevor Butler	4,723	8.3	+2.0
Total formal votes		57,130	97.6	
Informal votes		1,419	2.4	
Turnout		58,549	87.7	
Two-party-preferred result
Labor	Graeme Campbell	28,889	50.6	+8.1
Liberal	Mick Cotter	28,241	49.4	−8.1
Labor gain from Liberal		Swing	+8.1	

=== Elections in the 1970s ===
==== 1977 ====
1977 Australian federal election: Kalgoorlie
Party	Candidate	Votes	%	±%
Liberal	Mick Cotter	27,512	49.3	−4.4
Labor	Brian Conway	20,862	37.4	−5.8
Democrats	Edwin Routley	3,534	6.3	+6.3
National Country	Squire Fletcher	2,399	4.3	+4.3
Progress	Graham Mills	1,529	2.7	−0.4
Total formal votes		55,836	96.8	
Informal votes		1,855	3.2	
Turnout		57,691	90.5	
Two-party-preferred result
Liberal	Mick Cotter		58.5	+2.3
Labor	Brian Conway		41.5	−2.3
Liberal hold		Swing	+2.3	

==== 1975 ====
1975 Australian federal election: Kalgoorlie
Party	Candidate	Votes	%	±%
Liberal	Mick Cotter	25,994	51.7	+9.8
Labor	Fred Collard	22,734	45.2	−5.1
Workers	Graham Mills	1,538	3.1	+3.1
Total formal votes		50,266	97.9	
Informal votes		1,055	2.1	
Turnout		51,321	89.8	
Two-party-preferred result
Liberal	Mick Cotter		54.2	+6.3
Labor	Fred Collard		45.8	−6.3
Liberal gain from Labor		Swing	+6.3	

==== 1974 ====
1974 Australian federal election: Kalgoorlie
Party	Candidate	Votes	%	±%
Labor	Fred Collard	22,925	50.3	−8.5
Liberal	Mick Cotter	19,072	41.9	+6.9
National Alliance	George Kyros	2,520	5.5	−0.7
Australia	Ian Kelly	555	1.2	+1.2
Independent	James Jackson	487	1.1	+1.1
Total formal votes		45,559	97.4	
Informal votes		1,216	2.6	
Turnout		46,775	88.1	
Two-party-preferred result
Labor	Fred Collard		52.1	−7.3
Liberal	Mick Cotter		47.9	+7.3
Labor hold		Swing	−7.3	

==== 1972 ====
1972 Australian federal election: Kalgoorlie
Party	Candidate	Votes	%	±%
Labor	Fred Collard	26,648	58.8	−0.2
Liberal	Gerald Gloster	15,837	35.0	−0.9
Democratic Labor	Geoffrey Sands	2,801	6.2	+1.1
Total formal votes		45,286	97.5	
Informal votes		1,182	2.5	
Turnout		46,468	89.4	
Two-party-preferred result
Labor	Fred Collard		60.0	+0.0
Liberal	Gerald Gloster		40.0	+0.0
Labor hold		Swing	+0.0	

=== Elections in the 1960s ===
==== 1969 ====
1969 Australian federal election: Kalgoorlie
Party	Candidate	Votes	%	±%
Labor	Fred Collard	23,138	59.0	+1.6
Liberal	Jim Samson	14,064	35.9	−1.0
Democratic Labor	Geoffrey Sands	1,983	5.1	−0.6
Total formal votes		39,185	98.1	
Informal votes		744	1.9	
Turnout		39,929	89.6	
Two-party-preferred result
Labor	Fred Collard		60.0	+1.5
Liberal	James Samson		40.0	−1.5
Labor hold		Swing	+1.5	

==== 1966 ====
1966 Australian federal election: Kalgoorlie
Party	Candidate	Votes	%	±%
Labor	Fred Collard	18,393	59.5	+7.2
Liberal	Grahame Jonas	10,762	34.8	−6.2
Democratic Labor	Geoffrey Sands	1,765	5.7	−1.0
Total formal votes		30,920	96.8	
Informal votes		1,020	3.2	
Turnout		31,940	89.6	
Two-party-preferred result
Labor	Fred Collard		60.6	+7.2
Liberal	Grahame Jonas		39.4	−7.2
Labor hold		Swing	+7.2	

==== 1963 ====
1963 Australian federal election: Kalgoorlie
Party	Candidate	Votes	%	±%
Labor	Fred Collard	16,180	52.3	+4.4
Liberal	Peter Browne	12,668	41.0	−2.3
Democratic Labor	James Ardagh	1,328	4.3	+1.4
Democratic Labor	Antonius Berkhout	751	2.4	+2.4
Total formal votes		30,927	98.5	
Informal votes		467	1.5	
Turnout		31,394	89.6	
Two-party-preferred result
Labor	Fred Collard		53.4	+2.8
Liberal	Peter Browne		46.6	−2.8
Labor hold		Swing	+2.8	

==== 1961 ====
1961 Australian federal election: Kalgoorlie
Party	Candidate	Votes	%	±%
Labor	Fred Collard	14,231	47.9	+3.6
Liberal	Peter Browne	12,850	43.3	+6.7
Democratic Labor	George Jensen	1,578	5.3	−6.6
Independent	Harold Illingworth	1,050	3.5	−3.8
Total formal votes		29,709	97.2	
Informal votes		859	2.8	
Turnout		30,568	91.2	
Two-party-preferred result
Labor	Fred Collard	15,034	50.6	+0.9
Liberal	Peter Browne	14,675	49.4	−0.9
Labor gain from Liberal		Swing	+0.9	

=== Elections in the 1950s ===
==== 1958 ====
1958 Australian federal election: Kalgoorlie
Party	Candidate	Votes	%	±%
Labor	Fred Collard	12,519	44.3	−16.8
Liberal	Peter Browne	10,337	36.6	+36.6
Democratic Labor	Antonius Berkhout	3,363	11.9	+11.9
Independent	Harold Illingworth	2,056	7.3	−31.6
Total formal votes		28,275	96.6	
Informal votes		1,008	3.4	
Turnout		29,283	93.4	
Two-party-preferred result
Liberal	Peter Browne	14,227	50.3	+50.3
Labor	Fred Collard	14,048	49.7	−11.4
Liberal gain from Labor		Swing	+11.4	

==== 1955 ====
1955 Australian federal election: Kalgoorlie
Party	Candidate	Votes	%	±%
Labor	Herbert Johnson	17,033	61.1	−4.5
Independent	Harold Illingworth	10,844	38.9	+4.5
Total formal votes		27,877	96.3	
Informal votes		1,067	3.7	
Turnout		28,944	93.2	
Labor hold		Swing	−1.8	

==== 1954 ====
1954 Australian federal election: Kalgoorlie
Party	Candidate	Votes	%	±%
Labor	Herbert Johnson	17,130	65.6	−34.4
Independent	Harold Illingworth	8,991	34.4	+34.4
Total formal votes		26,121	98.1	
Informal votes		494	1.9	
Turnout		26,615	93.1	
Labor hold		Swing	−34.4	

==== 1951 ====
1951 Australian federal election: Kalgoorlie
Party	Candidate	Votes	%	±%
Labor	Herbert Johnson	unopposed		
Labor hold		Swing		

=== Elections in the 1940s ===
==== 1949 ====
1949 Australian federal election: Kalgoorlie
Party	Candidate	Votes	%	±%
Labor	Herbert Johnson	18,127	62.4	−9.3
Liberal	John Porteus	10,902	37.6	+9.3
Total formal votes		29,029	97.8	
Informal votes		653	2.2	
Turnout		29,682	93.9	
Labor hold		Swing	−9.3	

==== 1946 ====
1946 Australian federal election: Kalgoorlie
Party	Candidate	Votes	%	±%
Labor	Herbert Johnson	22,655	68.0	+0.4
Liberal	Seddon Vincent	10,646	32.0	−9.6
Total formal votes		33,301	97.8	
Informal votes		749	2.2	
Turnout		34,050	90.0	
Labor hold		Swing	−7.4	

==== 1943 ====
1943 Australian federal election: Kalgoorlie
Party	Candidate	Votes	%	±%
Labor	Herbert Johnson	23,424	67.6	−32.4
United Australia	Lance Horley	6,227	18.0	+18.0
Communist	Kevin Healy	3,002	8.7	+8.7
United Australia	Ralph Shaw	1,538	4.4	+4.4
Independent	William McGhie	463	1.3	+1.3
Total formal votes		34,654	96.9	
Informal votes		1,092	3.1	
Turnout		35,746	95.5	
Two-party-preferred result
Labor	Herbert Johnson		75.4	−24.6
United Australia	Lance Horley		24.6	+24.6
Labor hold		Swing	−24.6	

==== 1940 by-election ====
Kalgoorlie by-election, 1940
Party	Candidate	Votes	%	±%
Labor	Herbert Johnson	18,228	51.4	−48.6
United Australia	Frederick Lee	14,382	40.5	+40.5
Independent	Benjamin Finlay	1,721	4.9	+4.9
United Australia	Carlyle Ferguson	1,140	3.2	+3.2
Total formal votes		35,471	98.4	
Informal votes		567	1.6	
Turnout		36,038	82.0	
Two-party-preferred result
Labor	Herbert Johnson		54.6	−45.4
United Australia	Frederick Lee		45.4	+45.4
Labor hold		Swing	−45.4	

==== 1940 ====
1940 Australian federal election: Kalgoorlie
Party	Candidate	Votes	%	±%
Labor	Albert Green	unopposed		
Labor hold		Swing		

=== Elections in the 1930s ===
==== 1937 ====
1937 Australian federal election: Kalgoorlie
Party	Candidate	Votes	%	±%
Labor	Albert Green	25,771	73.6	−26.4
United Australia	Stephen Kellow	9,235	26.4	+26.4
Total formal votes		35,006	96.0	
Informal votes		1,457	4.0	
Turnout		36,463	88.4	
Labor hold		Swing	−26.4	

==== 1934 ====
1934 Australian federal election: Kalgoorlie
Party	Candidate	Votes	%	±%
Labor	Albert Green	unopposed		
Labor hold		Swing		

==== 1931 ====
1931 Australian federal election: Kalgoorlie
Party	Candidate	Votes	%	±%
Labor	Albert Green	15,419	57.5	−6.4
Country	William Pickering	7,156	26.7	+3.6
United Australia	George Rainsford	4,248	15.8	+2.8
Total formal votes		26,823	97.1	
Informal votes		807	2.9	
Turnout		27,630	86.5	
Two-party-preferred result
Labor	Albert Green		59.1	−6.1
Country	William Pickering		40.9	+6.1
Labor hold		Swing	−6.1	

=== Elections in the 1920s ===
==== 1929 ====
1929 Australian federal election: Kalgoorlie
Party	Candidate	Votes	%	±%
Labor	Albert Green	15,761	63.9	−36.1
Country	William Pickering	5,684	23.1	+23.1
Nationalist	William Greenard	3,203	13.0	+13.0
Total formal votes		24,648	98.0	
Informal votes		505	2.0	
Turnout		25,153	84.6	
Two-party-preferred result
Labor	Albert Green		65.2	−34.8
Country	William Pickering		34.8	+34.8
Labor hold		Swing	−34.8	

==== 1928 ====
1928 Australian federal election: Kalgoorlie
Party	Candidate	Votes	%	±%
Labor	Albert Green	unopposed		
Labor hold		Swing		

==== 1925 ====
1925 Australian federal election: Kalgoorlie
Party	Candidate	Votes	%	±%
Labor	Albert Green	14,245	57.6	+0.2
Nationalist	John Mullany	10,476	42.4	−0.2
Total formal votes		24,721	97.2	
Informal votes		717	2.8	
Turnout		25,438	86.0	
Labor hold		Swing	+0.2	

==== 1922 ====
1922 Australian federal election: Kalgoorlie
Party	Candidate	Votes	%	±%
Labor	Albert Green	9,889	57.4	+8.9
Nationalist	George Foley	7,331	42.6	+9.9
Total formal votes		17,220	94.9	
Informal votes		917	5.1	
Turnout		18,137	58.4	
Labor gain from Nationalist		Swing	+7.1	

==== 1920 ====
Kalgoorlie by-election, 1920
Party	Candidate	Votes	%	±%
Nationalist	George Foley	8,382	51.4	+3.5
Labor	Hugh Mahon	7,939	48.6	−3.5
Total formal votes		16,321	99.3	+0.6
Informal votes		113	0.7	−0.6
Turnout		16,434	79.1	−0.2
Nationalist gain from Labor		Swing	+3.5	

=== Elections in the 1910s ===
==== 1919 ====
1919 Australian federal election: Kalgoorlie
Party	Candidate	Votes	%	±%
Labor	Hugh Mahon	9,220	52.1	+3.4
Nationalist	Edward Heitmann	8,480	47.9	−3.4
Total formal votes		17,700	98.7	
Informal votes		237	1.3	
Turnout		17,937	79.3	
Labor gain from Nationalist		Swing	+3.4	

==== 1917 ====
1917 Australian federal election: Kalgoorlie
Party	Candidate	Votes	%	±%
Nationalist	Edward Heitmann	11,659	51.3	+51.3
Labor	Hugh Mahon	11,087	48.7	−51.3
Total formal votes		22,746	97.3	
Informal votes		635	2.7	
Turnout		23,381	84.4	
Nationalist gain from Labor		Swing	+51.3	

==== 1914 ====
1914 Australian federal election: Kalgoorlie
Party	Candidate	Votes	%	±%
Labor	Hugh Mahon	unopposed		
Labor hold		Swing		

==== 1913 by-election ====
Kalgoorlie by-election, 1913
Party	Candidate	Votes	%	±%
Labor	Hugh Mahon	unopposed		
Labor hold		Swing		

==== 1913 ====
1913 Australian federal election: Kalgoorlie
Party	Candidate	Votes	%	±%
Labor	Charlie Frazer	unopposed		
Labor hold		Swing		

==== 1910 ====
1910 Australian federal election: Kalgoorlie
Party	Candidate	Votes	%	±%
Labour	Charlie Frazer	11,162	81.4	+2.4
Liberal	John Thornett	2,550	18.6	−2.4
Total formal votes		13,712	98.5	
Informal votes		214	1.5	
Turnout		13,926	64.3	
Labour hold		Swing	+2.4	

=== Elections in the 1900s ===
==== 1906 ====
1906 Australian federal election: Kalgoorlie
Party	Candidate	Votes	%	±%
Labour	Charlie Frazer	7,715	79.0	+12.4
Western Australian	William Burton	2,051	21.0	−12.4
Total formal votes		9,766	96.7	
Informal votes		338	3.3	
Turnout		10,104	36.2	
Labour hold		Swing	+12.4	

==== 1903 ====
1903 Australian federal election: Kalgoorlie
Party	Candidate	Votes	%	±%
Labour	Charlie Frazer	5,820	66.6	+66.6
Free Trade	John Kirwan	2,913	33.4	−30.7
Total formal votes		8,733	96.8	
Informal votes		286	3.2	
Turnout		9,019	38.9	
Labour gain from Free Trade		Swing	+30.7	

==== 1901 ====
1901 Australian federal election: Kalgoorlie
Party	Candidate	Votes	%	±%
Free Trade	John Kirwan	5,374	64.1	+64.1
Ind. Free Trade	John Hopkins	3,015	35.9	+35.9
Total formal votes		8,389	44.6	
Free Trade win		(new seat)		
