= Candidates of the 1958 Australian federal election =

This article provides information on candidates who stood for the 1958 Australian federal election. The election was held on 22 November 1958.

== By-elections, appointments and defections ==
=== By-elections and appointments ===
- On 11 April 1956, Victor Kearney (Labor) was elected unopposed to replace Billy Davies (Labor) as the member for Cunningham.
- On 28 August 1956, George Hannan (Liberal) was appointed a Victorian Senator to replace John Spicer (Liberal).
- On 13 October 1956, Jim Forbes (Liberal) was elected to replace Archie Cameron (Liberal) as the member for Barker.
- On 8 December 1956, Les Bury (Liberal) was elected to replace Sir Eric Harrison (Liberal) as the member for Wentworth.
- On 6 June 1957, Charles Sandford (Labor) was appointed a Victorian Senator to replace Jack Devlin (Labor).
- On 15 September 1957, Doug Anthony (Country) was elected to replace Larry Anthony (Country) as the member for Richmond.
- On 8 March 1958, Sir Garfield Barwick (Liberal) was elected to replace Howard Beale (Liberal) as the member for Parramatta.
- On 30 July 1958, James Ormonde (Labor) was appointed a New South Wales Senator to replace Bill Ashley (Labor).
- On 12 August 1958, Tom Drake-Brockman (Country) was appointed a Western Australian Senator to replace Harrie Seward (Country).
- On 11 October 1958, Harry Bruce (Labor), the member for Leichhardt, died. Due to the proximity of the election, no by-election was held.

=== Defections ===
- In 1957, Queensland Labor Senator Condon Byrne switched to the Queensland Labor Party.
- In 1958, Labor MP Charles Morgan (Reid) lost preselection. He contested the election as an independent.

== Retiring Members and Senators ==
=== Labor ===
- Cyril Chambers MP (Adelaide, SA)
- Robert Holt MP (Darebin, Vic)
- Rowley James MP (Hunter, NSW)
- Herbert Johnson MP (Kalgoorlie, WA)
- David Watkins MP (Newcastle, NSW)
- Senator Jack Critchley (SA)
- Senator James Fraser (WA)
- Senator Donald Grant (NSW)
- Senator John Harris (WA)
- Senator John Ryan (SA)

=== Liberal ===
- Sir Philip McBride MP (Wakefield, SA)

=== Country ===
- William Brand MP (Wide Bay, Qld)
- Sir Arthur Fadden MP (McPherson, Qld)

== House of Representatives ==
Sitting members at the time of the election are shown in bold text. Successful candidates are highlighted in the relevant colour. Where there is possible confusion, an asterisk (*) is also used.

=== Australian Capital Territory ===
| Electorate | Held by | Labor candidate | Liberal candidate | Independent candidate |
|---|---|---|---|---|
| Australian Capital Territory | Labor | **Jim Fraser** | Anne Dalgarno | Phil Day |

=== New South Wales ===
| Electorate | Held by | Labor candidate | Coalition candidate | DLP candidate | Other candidates |
|---|---|---|---|---|---|
| Banks | Labor | **Eric Costa** | Edgar Booth (Lib) | John Lloyd | Pat Clancy (CPA) |
| Barton | Labor | Len Reynolds | Bill Arthur (Lib) | Reginald Lawson | |
| Bennelong | Liberal | Harold Coates | **John Cramer** (Lib) | Roderick Gray | Patrick Rossiter (Ind) |
| Blaxland | Labor | **Eli Harrison** | Winston Pickering (Lib) | Carlyle Dalgleish | |
| Bradfield | Liberal | Percy Staines | **Harry Turner** (Lib) | Dominique Droulers | |
| Calare | Liberal | Robert Rygate | **John Howse** (Lib) | | |
| Cowper | Country | Frank McGuren | **Sir Earle Page** (CP) | John Kellett | |
| Cunningham | Labor | **Victor Kearney** | Jack Hough (Lib) | Harold Woods | Bill McDougall (CPA) |
| Dalley | Labor | **William O'Connor** | Elton Lewis (Lib) | | |
| Darling | Labor | **Joe Clark** | Elson Whyte (CP) | | Francis O'Donnell (Ind) |
| East Sydney | Labor | **Eddie Ward** | Derek Montefiore-Castle (Lib) | Mervyn Reid | Eddie Maher (CPA) |
| Eden-Monaro | Labor | **Allan Fraser** | Douglas Thomson (Lib) | John Donohue | |
| Evans | Liberal | James Monaghan | **Frederick Osborne** (Lib) | Lawrence Pedemont | |
| Farrer | Liberal | Robert Garland | **David Fairbairn** (Lib) | William Brennan | |
| Grayndler | Labor | **Fred Daly** | Evan MacLaurin (Lib) | Charles McCafferty | Hal Alexander (CPA); William McCristal (Ind) |
| Gwydir | Country | Austin Heffernan | **Ian Allan** (CP) | | |
| Hughes | Labor | **Les Johnson** | John Dwyer (Lib) | Kevin O'Connor | |
| Hume | Country | Arthur Fuller | **Charles Anderson** (CP) | Raymond Nolan | |
| Hunter | Labor | **H. V. Evatt** | John Marsden (Lib) | William Burke | |
| Kingsford-Smith | Labor | **Dan Curtin** | George Dan (Lib) | Bernard McOrrie | |
| Lang | Labor | **Frank Stewart** | Hugh Bygott (Lib) | Kevin Davis | |
| Lawson | Country | Jack Tully | **Laurie Failes** (CP) | Edward English | |
| Lowe | Liberal | Joseph Sloss | **William McMahon** (Lib) | Mollie Dolan | |
| Lyne | Country | John Allan | **Philip Lucock** (CP) | William Gleeson | Joe Cordner (Ind); Murray Hooke (Ind) |
| Macarthur | Liberal | Eric Ryan | **Jeff Bate** (Lib) | | |
| Mackellar | Liberal | Mabel Elliott | **Bill Wentworth** (Lib) | Ann Macken | Hugh Begg (CPA) |
| Macquarie | Labor | **Tony Luchetti** | Norman Leven (Lib) | Hugh Dougherty | |
| Mitchell | Liberal | Reginald Byrne | **Roy Wheeler** (Lib) | Francis Moffitt | |
| New England | Country | Donald White | **David Drummond** (CP) | John Burless | |
| Newcastle | Labor | Charles Jones | Alwyn Watkins (Lib) | Jack Collins | Sidney Monroe (Ind); Mary Pepperall (Ind) |
| North Sydney | Liberal | Jack Stephens | **William Jack** (Lib) | Gregory McGirr | Edward McGregor (Ind) |
| Parkes | Labor | **Les Haylen** | George Chambers (Lib) | Maurice Colreavy | |
| Parramatta | Liberal | Ray Jones | **Sir Garfield Barwick** (Lib) | William Kildea | |
| Paterson | Liberal | Alan Lloyd | **Allen Fairhall** (Lib) | Douglas Drinkwater | |
| Phillip | Liberal | Joe Fitzgerald | **William Aston** (Lib) | Peter Daly | Sidney Doubleday (Ind) |
| Reid | Labor | Tom Uren | Derek Bryden (Lib) | Andrew Murphy | **Charles Morgan** (Ind) |
| Richmond | Country | William Smith | **Doug Anthony** (CP) | | Timothy Donnelly (Ind) |
| Riverina | Country | Jack Ward | **Hugh Roberton** (CP) | Peter Rolfe | |
| Robertson | Liberal | Joseph McCaig | **Roger Dean** (Lib) | Neil Mackerras | |
| Shortland | Labor | **Charles Griffiths** | Hilary Fallins (Lib) | Robert Burke | William Quinn (CPA) |
| St George | Liberal | Lionel Clay | **Bill Graham** (Lib) | Mary Nappa | |
| Warringah | Liberal | Norman Braviner | **Francis Bland** (Lib) | Peter Keogh | |
| Watson | Labor | **Jim Cope** | John Bampton (Lib) | Kenneth Collins | |
| Wentworth | Liberal | Sydney Davis | **Les Bury** (Lib) | John Gillian | |
| Werriwa | Labor | **Gough Whitlam** | John Shannon (Lib) | Les Hale | |
| West Sydney | Labor | **Dan Minogue** | Adrian Cook (Lib) | Allan Charlesworth | Lance Sharkey (CPA) |

=== Northern Territory ===
| Electorate | Held by | Labor candidate | Independent candidate |
|---|---|---|---|
| Northern Territory | Labor | **Jock Nelson** | James Martin |

=== Queensland ===
| Electorate | Held by | Labor candidate | Coalition candidate | QLP candidate | Other candidates |
|---|---|---|---|---|---|
| Bowman | Liberal | Hector Chalmers | **Malcolm McColm** (Lib) | Terence Burns | Noel Condie (ANP) |
| Brisbane | Labor | **George Lawson** | Kevin Cairns (Lib) | Geoffrey Maule | Jim Henderson (CPA); John Morgan (ANP) |
| Capricornia | Liberal | Colin Maxwell | **George Pearce** (Lib) | James Verney | |
| Darling Downs | Liberal | Jack McCafferty | **Reginald Swartz** (Lib) | Margaret Walsh | |
| Dawson | Country | Selwyn Ferguson | **Charles Davidson** (CP) | Waller O'Grady | |
| Fisher | Country | William Weir | **Charles Adermann** (CP) | James Humphries | |
| Griffith | Labor | **Wilfred Coutts** | Arthur Chresby (Lib) | Greg Kehoe | |
| Herbert | Labor | **Bill Edmonds** | John Murray (Lib) | Victor Bodero | Hugh Fay (CPA) |
| Kennedy | Labor | **Bill Riordan** | Alexander Hindson (CP) | Bob Katter | |
| Leichhardt | Labor | Bill Fulton | George Turner (CP) | James Bidner | |
| Lilley | Liberal | Jack Melloy | **Bruce Wight** (Lib) | Walter Barnes | Mervyn Goldstiver (ANP) |
| Maranoa | Country | Leslie Beaumont | **Wilfred Brimblecombe** (CP) | Alfred Dohring | |
| McPherson | Country | Harold Evans | Charles Barnes (CP) | John Hilton | |
| Moreton | Liberal | Bernard Ouston | **James Killen** (Lib) | Ted Mansfield | Max Julius (CPA) |
| Oxley | Liberal | Robert Warren | **Donald Cameron** (Lib) | | Wallace Dawson (CPA) |
| Petrie | Liberal | John Claffey | **Alan Hulme** (Lib) | Maxwell McCurdie | Horace Burge (ANP) |
| Ryan | Liberal | Bernard McDonnell | **Nigel Drury** (Lib) | Bryan Hurley | Ronald Edmonds (ANP) |
| Wide Bay | Country | Brendan Hansen | Henry Bandidt (CP) | Edward McDonnell | |

=== South Australia ===
| Electorate | Held by | Labor candidate | Liberal candidate | DLP candidate | Other candidates |
|---|---|---|---|---|---|
| Adelaide | Labor | Joe Sexton | Ian Wilson | Baylon Ryan | |
| Angas | Liberal | Darcy Nielsen | **Alick Downer** | Susan Critchley | Sydney Edwards (Ind) |
| Barker | Liberal | Norman Alcock | **Jim Forbes** | Frank Marshall | |
| Bonython | Labor | **Norman Makin** | Thomas Foale | Edward Timlin | Joseph Buchanan (CPA) |
| Boothby | Liberal | Ralph Dettman | **John McLeay** | George Hodgson | |
| Grey | Labor | **Edgar Russell** | David Gunn | Richard Mills | Frank Rieck (Ind) |
| Hindmarsh | Labor | **Clyde Cameron** | Alan Smith | Francis Moran | |
| Kingston | Labor | **Pat Galvin** | Cecil Anderson | Brian Crowe | |
| Port Adelaide | Labor | **Albert Thompson** | David Garvie | Gerald Shinnick | Peter Symon (CPA) |
| Sturt | Liberal | Siegfried Hausler | **Keith Wilson** | Norman Vowles | |
| Wakefield | Liberal | Leonard Krieg | Bert Kelly | Leo Redden | Hector Henstridge (Ind) |

=== Tasmania ===
| Electorate | Held by | Labor candidate | Liberal candidate | DLP candidate | Communist candidate |
|---|---|---|---|---|---|
| Bass | Labor | **Lance Barnard** | Max Bushby | Leslie Arnold | |
| Braddon | Liberal | Ron Davies | **Aubrey Luck** | Frances Lane | |
| Denison | Liberal | Bert Lacey | **Athol Townley** | Harold Senior | Max Bound |
| Franklin | Liberal | Lynda Heaven | **Bill Falkinder** | Henry Scoles | |
| Wilmot | Labor | **Gil Duthie** | Ralph Cameron | Francis Lillis | |

=== Victoria ===
| Electorate | Held by | Labor candidate | Coalition candidate | DLP candidate | Other candidates |
|---|---|---|---|---|---|
| Balaclava | Liberal | Norman Rothfield | **Percy Joske** (Lib) | Rex Keane | Grace Stratton (Ind) |
| Ballaarat | Liberal | Donald Drummond | **Dudley Erwin** (Lib) | Bob Joshua | |
| Batman | Labor | **Alan Bird** | Fred Capp (Lib) | Tom Walsh | |
| Bendigo | Labor | **Percy Clarey** | Henry Snell (Lib) | Bill Drechsler | |
| Bruce | Liberal | Keith Ewert | **Billy Snedden** (Lib) | Henri de Sachau | |
| Chisholm | Liberal | Leo Bartley | **Sir Wilfrid Kent Hughes** (Lib) | John Hoare | |
| Corangamite | Liberal | Edwin Morris | **Dan Mackinnon** (Lib) | Patrick Bourke | Elsie Brushfield (Ind) |
| Corio | Liberal | Bernard O'Leary | **Hubert Opperman** (Lib) | James Mahoney | |
| Darebin | Labor | Frank Courtnay | Gordon Duncan (Lib) | Tom Andrews | |
| Deakin | Liberal | Norm Griffiths | **Frank Davis** (Lib) | Terence Collins | |
| Fawkner | Liberal | George Smart | **Peter Howson** (Lib) | Bill Bourke | |
| Flinders | Liberal | Nola Barber | **Robert Lindsay** (Lib) | Thomas Flanagan | |
| Gellibrand | Labor | **Hector McIvor** | Barry Maddern (Lib) | James Eudey | Frank Johnson (CPA) |
| Gippsland | Country | Clement Little | **George Bowden** (CP) | John Hansen | |
| Henty | Liberal | Tom Gilhooley | **Max Fox** (Lib) | Henry Moore | |
| Higgins | Liberal | Alfred Shiff | **Harold Holt** (Lib) | Celia Laird | |
| Higinbotham | Lib | Edwin Lamb | **Frank Timson** (Lib) | Desmond Ward | |
| Indi | Liberal | John McLaren | **William Bostock** (Lib); Mac Holten* (CP) | Henry Richards | James Ellis (Ind) |
| Isaacs | Liberal | Barry Jones | **William Haworth** (Lib) | John Hughes | Elias Cowan (Ind) |
| Kooyong | Liberal | Dolph Eddy | **Robert Menzies** (Lib) | John Buchanan | Gerry O'Day (CPA) |
| La Trobe | Liberal | Sam Goldbloom | **Richard Casey** (Lib) | Terence Kirley | |
| Lalor | Labor | **Reg Pollard** | Peter Kemp (Lib) | John Donnellon | |
| Mallee | Country | George Xeros | **Winton Turnbull** (CP) | John Cotter | |
| Maribyrnong | Liberal | Doug Elliot | **Philip Stokes** (Lib) | Paul Gunn | |
| McMillan | Liberal | George Brown | **Alex Buchanan*** (Lib); Francis Hawtin (CP) | Kevin Scanlon | Wattie Doig (CPA); Decima Mayne (Ind) |
| Melbourne | Labor | **Arthur Calwell** | James Moloney (Lib) | John Ryan | |
| Melbourne Ports | Labor | **Frank Crean** | Norman Loader (Lib) | John Fitzgerald | Roger Wilson (CPA) |
| Murray | Country | Neil Frankland | **John McEwen** (CP) | Brian Lacey | |
| Scullin | Labor | **Ted Peters** | Bill Burns (Lib) | Thomas Brennan | |
| Wannon | Liberal | Jack Stanford | **Malcolm Fraser** (Lib) | Terence Callander | |
| Wills | Labor | **Gordon Bryant** | Alfred Wall (Lib) | Bill Bryson | |
| Wimmera | Liberal | Thomas Windsor | Robert King* (CP); **William Lawrence** (Lib) | James McCaffrey | |
| Yarra | Labor | **Jim Cairns** | Cecil Lanyon (Lib) | Stan Keon | Ken Miller (CPA) |

=== Western Australia ===
| Electorate | Held by | Labor candidate | Coalition candidate | DLP candidate | Other candidates |
|---|---|---|---|---|---|
| Canning | Country | | **Len Hamilton** (CP) | Patrick Cranley | |
| Curtin | Liberal | Frederick Traine | **Paul Hasluck** (Lib) | John Antill | |
| Forrest | Liberal | Ernest Stapleton | **Gordon Freeth** (Lib) | Arthur Addis | |
| Fremantle | Labor | **Kim Beazley** | Peter Goode (Lib) | | Paddy Troy (CPA) |
| Kalgoorlie | Labor | Fred Collard | Peter Browne (Lib) | Antonius Berkhout | Harold Illingworth (Ind) |
| Moore | Country | Wilbur Bennett | Hugh Halbert* (Lib); **Hugh Leslie** (CP) | | |
| Perth | Liberal | Laurie Wilkinson | **Fred Chaney** (Lib) | Terence Merchant | Claude Swaine (Ind) |
| Stirling | Labor | **Harry Webb** | Doug Cash (Lib) | Brian Peachey | James Collins (Ind) |
| Swan | Liberal | Keith Dowding | **Richard Cleaver** (Lib) | Charles Noonan | |

== Senate ==
Sitting Senators are shown in bold text. Tickets that elected at least one Senator are highlighted in the relevant colour. Successful candidates are identified by an asterisk (*).

=== New South Wales ===
Six seats were up for election. One of these was a short-term vacancy caused by Labor Senator Bill Ashley's death; this had been filled in the interim by Labor's James Ormonde. The Labor Party was defending four seats. The Liberal-Country Coalition was defending two seats. Senators John Armstrong (Labor), John McCallum (Liberal), Albert Reid (Country) and Bill Spooner (Liberal) were not up for re-election.

| Labor candidates | Coalition candidates | DLP candidates | Communist candidates | True Dem candidates | Ungrouped candidates |
|---|---|---|---|---|---|
| 1. **James Arnold***; 2. **James Ormonde***; 3. **Stan Amour***; 4. Gilbert Manuel | 1. **Sir Alister McMullin*** (Lib); 2. **Ken Anderson*** (Lib); 3. Colin McKellar* (CP) | 1. Jack Kane; 2. Jan Van Der Rijt; 3. Michael Fitzpatrick | 1. Jim Healy; 2. Laurie Aarons; 3. Flo Davis; 4. Rupert Lockwood | 1. Ronald Sarina; 2. Alfred Turner | George Cole; John Chapman-Mortimer; Edward Spensley; Charles de Monchaux; Anthony Micallef |

=== Queensland ===
Five seats were up for election. The Liberal-Country Coalition was defending three seats. The Labor Party was defending two seats (although Senator Condon Byrne had defected to the Queensland Labor Party). Senators Archie Benn (Labor), Walter Cooper (Country), Ben Courtice (Labor), Neil O'Sullivan (Liberal) and Dame Annabelle Rankin (Liberal) were not up for re-election.

| Labor candidates | Coalition candidates | QLP candidates | Communist candidates | Loyalist candidates |
|---|---|---|---|---|
| 1. **Gordon Brown***; 2. Felix Dittmer*; 3. Max Poulter | 1. **Ted Maher*** (CP); 2. **Ian Wood*** (Lib); 3. **Roy Kendall*** (Lib) | 1. **Condon Byrne**; 2. Harold Collins; 3. William Sturgess | 1. Tom Millar; 2. Ted Bacon; 3. Stella Nord | 1. Jean Reville; 2. Gladys Edwards |

=== South Australia ===
Five seats were up for election. The Labor Party was defending three seats. The Liberal Party was defending two seats. Senators Nancy Buttfield (Liberal), Clive Hannaford (Liberal), Ted Mattner (Liberal), Theo Nicholls (Labor) and Sid O'Flaherty (Labor) were not up for re-election.

| Labor candidates | Liberal candidates | DLP candidates | Communist candidates |
|---|---|---|---|
| 1. **Jim Toohey***; 2. Clem Ridley*; 3. Arnold Drury* | 1. **Rex Pearson***; 2. **Keith Laught***; 3. Gordon Davidson | 1. James O'Sullivan; 2. Daniel Smith; 3. Peter Lasarewitch | 1. Alan Finger; 2. Jim Moss; 3. Elliott Johnston |

=== Tasmania ===
Five seats were up for election. The Labor Party was defending three seats (although Senator George Cole had defected to the Democratic Labor Party). The Liberal Party was defending two seats. Senators Denham Henty (Liberal), Nick McKenna (Labor), Bob Poke (Labor), Robert Wardlaw (Liberal) and Reg Wright (Liberal) were not up for re-election.

| Labor candidates | Liberal candidates | DLP candidates | Ungrouped candidates |
|---|---|---|---|
| 1. **Justin O'Byrne***; 2. **Bill Aylett***; 3. Reg Murray | 1. Elliot Lillico*; 2. **John Marriott***; 3. **Robert Wordsworth** | 1. **George Cole***; 2. Bruce Dilger; 3. Virgil Morgan | Cornelius McShane |

=== Victoria ===
Six seats were up for election. One of these was a short-term vacancy caused by Liberal Senator John Spicer's resignation; this had been filled in the interim by Liberal George Hannan. The Labor Party was defending three seats. The Liberal Party was defending three seats. Senators Don Cameron (Labor), Frank McManus (Democratic Labor), Jim Sheehan (Labor) and Harrie Wade (Country) were not up for re-election.

| Labor candidates | Liberal candidates | DLP candidates | Communist candidates | Republican candidates |
|---|---|---|---|---|
| 1. **Pat Kennelly***; 2. **Bert Hendrickson***; 3. **Charles Sandford***; 4. Maurice Ashkanasy | 1. **John Gorton***; 2. **Ivy Wedgwood***; 3. **George Hannan*** | 1. Jack Little; 2. Frank Burns; 3. Eileen Slattery; 4. Vilmos Kormos | 1. Ralph Gibson; 2. Kath Williams; 3. Andy Wallace; 4. Bill Tregear | 1. John Murray; 2. Richard Mullins |

=== Western Australia ===
Five seats were up for election. The Labor Party was defending three seats. The Liberal Party was defending one seat. The Country Party was defending one seat. Senators Shane Paltridge (Liberal), Agnes Robertson (Country), Dorothy Tangney (Labor), Seddon Vincent (Liberal) and Don Willesee (Labor) were not up for re-election.

| Labor candidates | Liberal candidates | Country candidates | DLP candidates | Communist candidates | Ungrouped candidates |
|---|---|---|---|---|---|
| 1. **Joe Cooke***; 2. Harry Cant*; 3. Patrick O'Brien | 1. **Malcolm Scott***; 2. George Branson*; 3. Peter Sim | 1. **Tom Drake-Brockman***; 2. Jessie Robertson; 3. Bill Robinson | 1. Bernard Flanagan; 2. Veronica Bonser | 1. John Gandini; 2. Annette Aarons; 3. John Wilson | Gerard Benson |

== Summary by party ==
Beside each party is the number of seats contested by that party in the House of Representatives for each state, as well as an indication of whether the party contested Senate elections in each state.

| Party | NSW | | Vic | | Qld | | WA | | SA | | Tas | | ACT | NT | Total | |
| Party | HR | S | HR | S | HR | S | HR | S | HR | S | HR | S | HR | HR | HR | S |
|---|---|---|---|---|---|---|---|---|---|---|---|---|---|---|---|---|
| Australian Labor Party | 47 | * | 33 | * | 18 | * | 8 | * | 11 | * | 5 | * | 1 | 1 | 124 | 6 |
| Liberal Party of Australia | 38 | * | 30 | * | 11 | * | 8 | * | 11 | * | 5 | * | 1 | | 104 | 6 |
| Australian Country Party | 9 | * | 6 | | 7 | * | 2 | * | | | | | | | 25 | 3 |
| Democratic Labor Party | 41 | * | 33 | * | | | 7 | * | 11 | * | 5 | * | | | 97 | 5 |
| Communist Party of Australia | 7 | * | 5 | * | 4 | * | 1 | * | 2 | * | 1 | * | | | 20 | 6 |
| Queensland Labor Party | | | | | 18 | * | | | | | | | | | 18 | 1 |
| Australian Nationalist Party | | | | | 5 | | | | | | | | | | 5 | |
| True Democratic Party | | * | | | | | | | | | | | | | | 1 |
| Australian Republican Party | | | | * | | | | | | | | | | | | 1 |
| Loyalist Party | | | | | | * | | | | | | | | | | 1 |
| Independent and other | 11 | | 5 | | | | 3 | | 3 | | | | 1 | | 23 | |

== See also ==
- 1958 Australian federal election
- Members of the Australian House of Representatives, 1955–1958
- Members of the Australian House of Representatives, 1958–1961
- Members of the Australian Senate, 1956–1959
- Members of the Australian Senate, 1959–1962
- List of political parties in Australia
