= 1913 Kalgoorlie by-election =

Australian federal by-election

← 1913	22 December 1913	1914 →

The Kalgoorlie seat in the House of Representatives
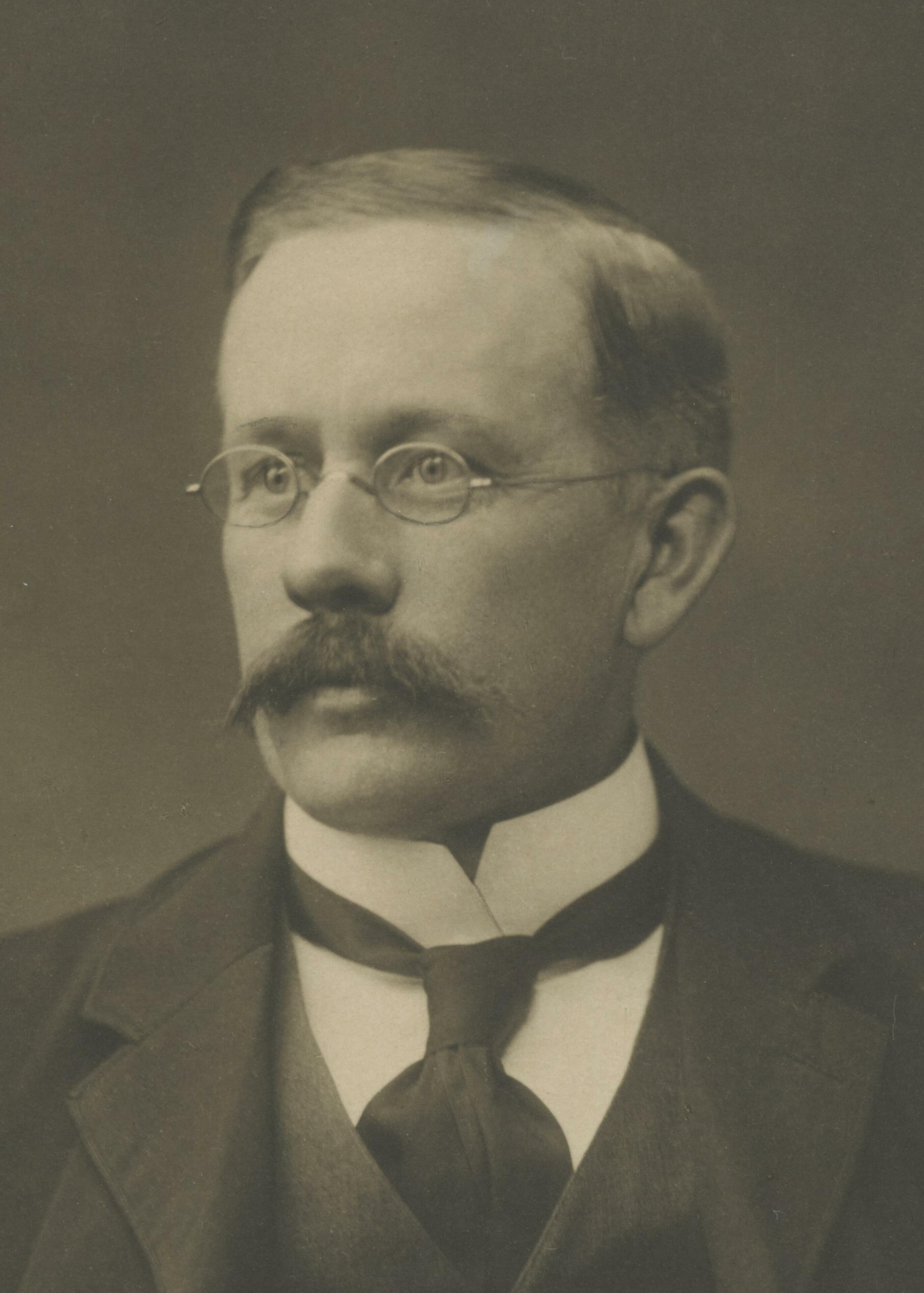
	First party
Candidate	Hugh Mahon
Party	Labor
Popular vote	unopposed
MP before election
Charlie Frazer
Labor
Elected MP
Hugh Mahon
Labor

A by-election for the Australian House of Representatives seat of Kalgoorlie was triggered by the death, on 25 November 1913, of Labor MP and Postmaster-General Charlie Frazer. Aged 33, Frazer was the youngest member of the Australian Parliament ever to die. By the close of nominations on 22 December, only one candidate, Labor's Hugh Mahon, previously member for Coolgardie from 1910 to 1913, had nominated, and he was thus declared elected unopposed.

== Results ==
Kalgoorlie by-election, 1913
Party	Candidate	Votes	%	±%
Labor	Hugh Mahon	unopposed		
Labor hold		Swing		
