= Electoral results for the Division of Coolgardie =

Australian division election results

This is a list of electoral results for the Division of Coolgardie in Australian federal elections from the division's creation in 1901 until its abolition in 1913.

== Members ==
Member	Party	Term
Hugh Mahon	Labor	1901–1913

== Election results ==
=== Elections in the 1910s ===
==== 1910 ====
1910 Australian federal election: Coolgardie
Party	Candidate	Votes	%	±%
Labour	Hugh Mahon	9,915	74.5	+1.4
Liberal	Robert Hastie	3,170	23.8	−3.1
Independent	Harry McClay	226	1.7	+1.7
Total formal votes		13,311	96.2	
Informal votes		523	3.8	
Turnout		13,834	55.7	
Labour hold		Swing	+2.3	

=== Elections in the 1900s ===
==== 1906 ====
1906 Australian federal election: Coolgardie
Party	Candidate	Votes	%	±%
Labour	Hugh Mahon	6,806	73.1	−26.9
Western Australian	John Archibald	2,503	26.9	+26.9
Total formal votes		9,309	96.1	
Informal votes		376	3.9	
Turnout		9,685	33.3	
Labour hold		Swing	−26.9	

==== 1903 ====
1903 Australian federal election: Coolgardie
Party	Candidate	Votes	%	±%
Labour	Hugh Mahon	unopposed		
Labour hold		Swing		

==== 1901 ====
1901 Australian federal election: Coolgardie
Party	Candidate	Votes	%	±%
Labour	Hugh Mahon	3,329	52.8	+52.8
Free Trade	John Archibald	2,974	47.2	+47.2
Total formal votes		6,303		
Labour win		(new seat)		
