= Cedric Wyatt =

Australian Indigenous activist (1940–2015)

Cedric Wyatt (7 April 1940 – 25 September 2014) was an Australian public servant and Indigenous rights advocate. A cousin of Ken Wyatt and the father of Ben Wyatt, both elected politicians, Wyatt worked in senior positions for Western Australia's Public Sector Commission and the federal Australian Public Service.

Among other roles, he was the shire president of the Shire of Cue, in Western Australia's Mid West region, for a period in the early 2000s. Wyatt also stood unsuccessfully as the Liberal candidate for the House of Representatives seat of Kalgoorlie at the 1996 federal election.

== Early life ==
Wyatt was born on 7 April 1940 to a white Australian father and an Aboriginal Australian mother. He was removed from his mother soon after he was born, and spent his early childhood at the Moore River Native Settlement. He attended school at Clontarf Aboriginal College and Aquinas College, Perth.

== Working life ==
After serving in the Royal Australian Air Force (RAAF) he moved to Papua New Guinea in 1963, where he worked as a teacher, principal and public servant until coming back to Australia in 1976. Wyatt's son, Ben Wyatt, who was later elected to Western Australia's Legislative Assembly, was born during his time in PNG. Between 1976 and 1979 he was CEO of the Western Australian Aboriginal Legal Service, later serving as Acting General Manager of the Aboriginal Development Commission.

He was Commissioner of the Aboriginal Affairs Planning Authority and CEO of its successor the Department of Aboriginal Affairs (now Department of Indigenous Affairs). In the early 2000s Wyatt was President of the Shire of Cue.

In 2008 Wyatt came out of retirement to work as a Court Officer for the ALS in Laverton.

He became the CEO of Jigalong Community, where he was a strong advocate for the rights of the Aboriginal community.

Wyatt was once a governor of the University of Notre Dame Australia.

== Political career ==
Wyatt was a member of the Labor Party until 1994, and during the 1980s unsuccessfully attempted to gain preselection for a Senate seat. After he left the party, he said that "the Aboriginal vote has been taken for granted with the ALP thinking it is their private property", and described the supporters of Ian Taylor as "scheming thugs". Wyatt subsequently joined the Liberal Party, and was preselected as the party's candidate in the Division of Kalgoorlie at the 1996 federal election. He was "the only Aboriginal candidate endorsed by a major party". Despite a nation-wide swing to the Liberals, Wyatt polled just 24.3 percent of the vote, a negative swing of over 10 points. Labor's vote went down by almost 20 points, as the seat was won by a second Labor defector, independent Graeme Campbell.

== Family ==
Wyatt was the father of Ben Wyatt and the cousin of Ken Wyatt.
