= Member for Kalgoorlie =

Member for Kalgoorlie may refer to:

- the member of the Australian House of Representatives for the Division of Kalgoorlie
- the member of the Western Australian Legislative Assembly for the Electoral district of Kalgoorlie
