= Mount Kokeby, Western Australia =

Mount Kokeby Western Australia
- Coordinates: 32°12′36″S 116°58′16″E
- Population: 90 (SAL 2021)
- Established: 1889
- Postcode(s): 6304
- Elevation: 243 m (797 ft)
- Location: 142 km (88 mi) SE of Perth; 12 km (7 mi) S of Beverley
- LGA(s): Shire of Beverley
- State electorate(s): Central Wheatbelt
- Federal division(s): Pearce
Mean max temp	Mean min temp	Annual rainfall
25.2 °C; 77 °F	10.2 °C; 50 °F	420.4 mm 16.6 in

Mount Kokeby or Kokeby is a small town in the Wheatbelt region of Western Australia, about 12 kilometres (7 mi) south of the town of Beverley towards Brookton.

== History ==
The town name is the product of a misspelling of Rokeby (after Henry Montagu, the 6th Baron Rokeby of Armagh, after whom Rokeby Road in Subiaco is also named). The nearby Mount Rokeby was named by John Septimus Roe in 1835, but when a station on the Great Southern Railway was opened in 1889, it was incorrectly spelt Mount Kokeby. The name stuck and the nearby hill's name was changed in 1950.

In 1899 the government land agent in Beverley suggested blocks of land be made available adjacent to the station, and following survey a townsite was gazetted here in 1902. An agricultural hall was built, but has since been demolished. The locality is predominantly used for wheat and sheep farming. The town is a receival site for Cooperative Bulk Handling.

== Notable residents ==
At the 1961 federal election, two former Kokeby residents were elected to federal parliament – Country Party senator Edgar Prowse and Labor MP Fred Collard.
