= 1958 Australian federal election =

- 22 November 1958

All 124 (Note: The Northern Territory and Australian Capital Territory each had one seat, but members for the territories did not have full voting rights until 1966 and did not count toward government formation.) seats of the House of Representatives 62 seats were needed for a majority in the House 32 (of the 60) seats of the Senate
- Registered: 5,384,624 ▲4.10%
- Turnout: 5,141,109 (95.48%) (▲0.48 pp)
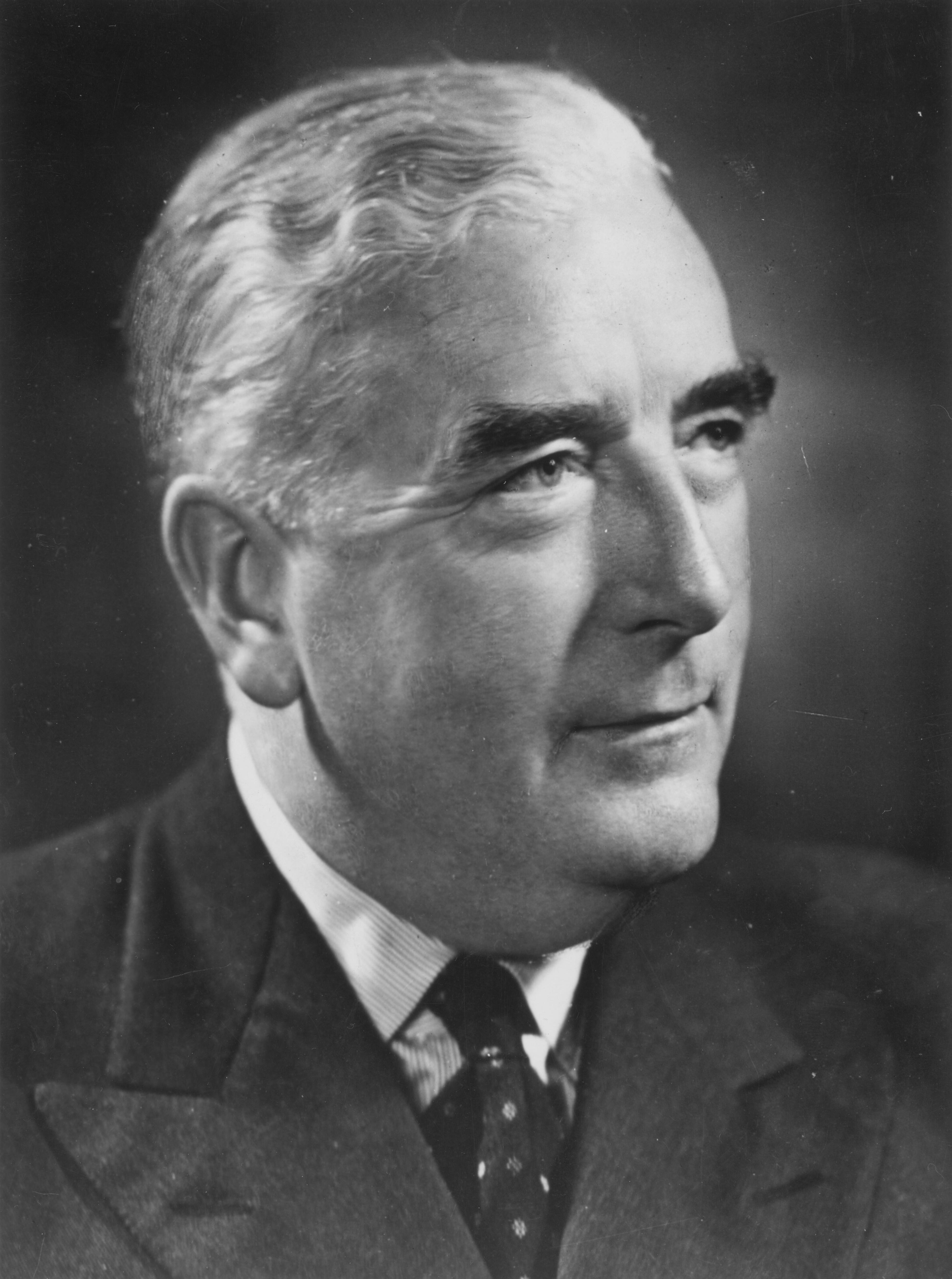

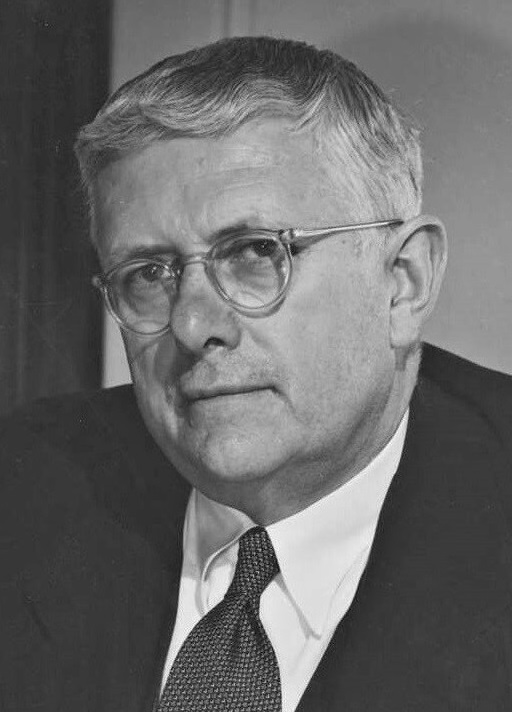
| | First party | Second party |
|---|---|---|
| Leader | Robert Menzies | H. V. Evatt |
| Party | Liberal–Country; Coalition | Labor |
| Leader since | 23 September 1943 | 13 June 1951 |
| Leader's seat | Kooyong (Vic.) | Hunter (NSW) (won seat) |
| Last election | 75 seats | 47 seats |
| Seats won | 77 | 45 + NT + ACT |
| Seat change | ▲2 | ▼2 |
| Primary vote | 2,298,512 | 2,137,890 |
| Percentage | 46.55% | 42.81% |
| Swing | ▼1.12 | ▼1.84 |
| TPP | 54.10% | 45.90% |
| TPP swing | ▼0.10 | ▲0.10 |
- Results by division for the House of Representatives, shaded by winning party's margin of victory.
Prime Minister before election
Robert Menzies
Liberal/Country coalition
Subsequent Prime Minister
Robert Menzies
Liberal/Country coalition

A federal election was held in Australia on 22 November 1958. All 122 seats in the House of Representatives and 32 of the 60 seats in the Senate were up for election. The incumbent Liberal–Country coalition led by Prime Minister Robert Menzies defeated the opposition Labor Party, led by H. V. Evatt.

== Issues ==
In spite of a major global downturn in early 1958, the Coalition was returned to power and there was an even swing against the Labor Party. This was due largely to support for the breakaway Democratic Labor Party. This was the first Australian election campaign to be fought using television as a medium for communicating with voters. Menzies was interviewed on television, while opposition figures H. V. Evatt and Arthur Calwell took part in debates with ministers Harold Holt and William McMahon. Somewhat surprisingly Menzies emerged as a confident and effective television performer. This may have contributed to the better than expected result for the government.

== Results ==
=== House of Representatives ===
House of Reps (IRV) — 1958–61—Turnout 95.48% (CV) — Informal 2.87%
| Party | First preference votes | % | Swing | Seats | Change |
|---|---|---|---|---|---|
| Liberal–Country coalition | 2,298,512 | 46.55 | –1.12 | 77 | +2 |
| Liberal | 1,859,180 | 37.23 | −2.53 | 58 | +1 |
| Country | 465,320 | 9.32 | +1.41 | 19 | +1 |
| Labor | 2,137,890 | 42.81 | −1.84 | 47 (Note: Including Northern Territory and Australian Capital Territory) | −2 |
| Democratic Labor | 389,688 | 7.80 | +2.63 | 0 | 0 |
| Queensland Labor | 80,035 | 1.60 | +1.60 | 0 | 0 |
| Communist | 26,337 | 0.53 | –0.63 | 0 | 0 |
| Nationalist | 3,577 | 0.07 | +0.07 | 0 | 0 |
| Independent | 31,466 | 0.63 | –0.74 | 0 | 0 |
| Total | 4,993,493 | | | 122 | |
Two-party-preferred (estimated)
| Liberal–Country coalition | Win | 54.10 | −0.10 | 77 | +2 |
| Labor | | 45.90 | +0.10 | 45 | −2 |

First preference vote
| Labor | 42.81% |
| Liberal | 37.23% |
| DLP/QLP | 9.41% |
| Country | 9.32% |
| Other | 1.23% |

Two-party-preferred vote
| Coalition | 54.10% |
| Labor | 45.90% |

Parliament seats
| Coalition | 63.11% |
| Labor | 36.89% |

=== Senate ===
Senate (STV) — 1958–61—Turnout 95.48% (CV) — Informal 10.29%
| Party | First preference votes | % | Swing | Seats won | Seats held | Change |
|---|---|---|---|---|---|---|
| Liberal–Country coalition | 2,084,193 | 45.19 | –3.49 | 16 | 32 | +2 |
| Liberal–Country joint ticket | 1,077,586 | 23.36 | –16.02 | 9 | N/A | N/A |
| Liberal | 953,856 | 20.68 | +12.02 | 6 | 25 | +1 |
| Country | 52,751 | 1.14 | +0.51 | 1 | 7 | +1 |
| Labor | 1,973,027 | 42.78 | +2.17 | 15 | 26 | –2 |
| Democratic Labor | 314,755 | 6.82 | +0.72 | 1 | 2 | 0 |
| Communist | 134,263 | 2.91 | −0.73 | 0 | 0 | 0 |
| Queensland Labor | 73,037 | 1.66 | +1.66 | 0 | 0 | 0 |
| Loyalist | 4,459 | 0.10 | +0.10 | 0 | 0 | 0 |
| True Democrat | 4,337 | 0.09 | +0.09 | 0 | 0 | 0 |
| Republican | 3,715 | 0.08 | +0.08 | 0 | 0 | 0 |
| Independents | 20,273 | 0.44 | –0.46 | 0 | 0 | 0 |
| Total | 4,612,059 | | | 32 | 60 | |

Notes

- The Democratic Labor Party was the renamed "Australian Labor Party (Anti-Communist)" from the 1955 election.

== Seats changing hands ==
| Seat | Pre-1958 | | | Swing | Post-1958 | | |
| Seat | Party | Member | Margin | Swing | Margin | Member | Party |
|---|---|---|---|---|---|---|---|
| Braddon, Tas | Liberal | Aubrey Luck | 8.9 | 9.3 | 0.4 | Ron Davies | Labor |
| Griffith, Qld | Labor | Wilfred Coutts | 1.3 | 1.4 | 0.1 | Arthur Chresby | Liberal |
| Herbert, Qld | Labor | Bill Edmonds | 6.6 | 8.1 | 1.5 | John Murray | Liberal |
| Indi, Vic | Liberal | William Bostock | N/A | 28.6 | 6.5 | Mac Holten | Country |
| Kalgoorlie, WA | Labor | Herbert Johnson | N/A | 11.4 | 0.3 | Peter Browne | Liberal |
| Moore, WA | Country | Hugh Leslie | 100.0 | 52.9 | 2.9 | Hugh Halbert | Liberal |
| St George, NSW | Liberal | Bill Graham | 2.4 | 2.5 | 0.1 | Lionel Clay | Labor |
| Stirling, WA | Labor | Harry Webb | 2.8 | 3.0 | 0.2 | Doug Cash | Liberal |
| Wimmera, Vic | Liberal | William Lawrence | N/A | 22.7 | 5.9 | Robert King | Country |

- Members listed in italics did not contest their seat at this election.

== See also ==
- Candidates of the 1958 Australian federal election
- Members of the Australian House of Representatives, 1958–1961
- Members of the Australian Senate, 1959–1962
