= 1940 Kalgoorlie by-election =

- 16 November 1940
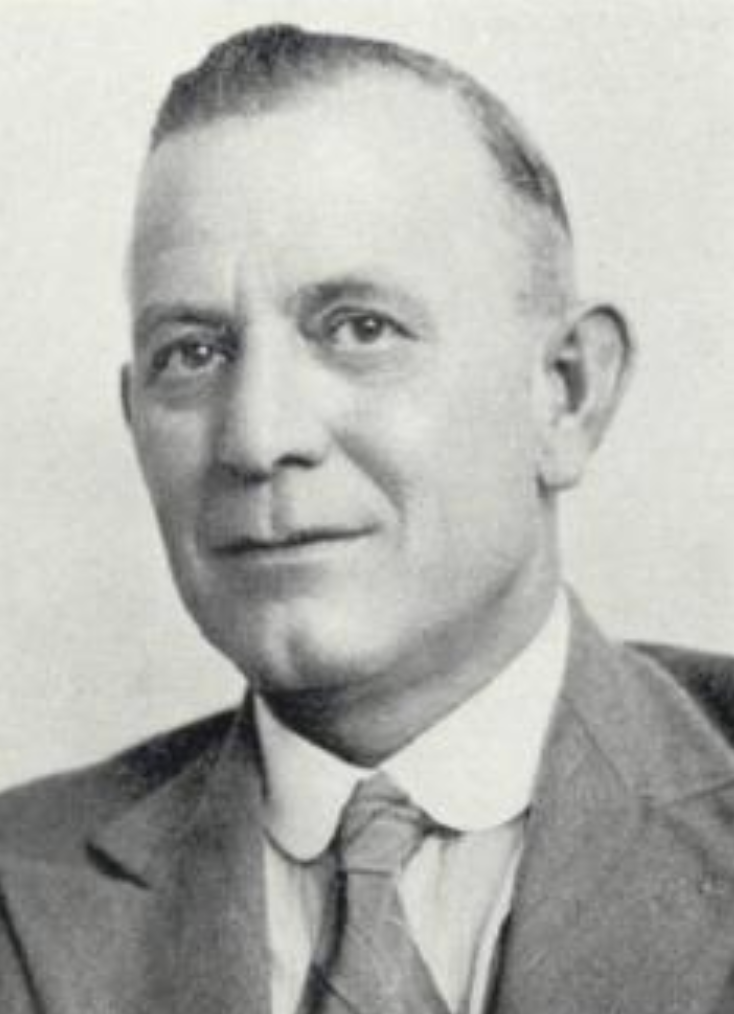
	First party	Second party
		UAP
Candidate	Herbert Johnson	Frederick Lee
Party	Labor	United Australia
Popular vote	18,228	14,382
Percentage	51.4%	40.5%
Swing	▼48.6pp	▼40.5pp
TPP	54.6%	45.4%
TPP swing	▼45.4pp	▲45.4pp
MP before election
Albert Green
Labor
Elected MP
Hebert Johnson
Labor

A by-election was held for the Australian House of Representatives seat of Kalgoorlie on 16 November 1940. This was triggered by the death of Labor MP Albert Green.

The by-election was won by Labor candidate Herbert Johnson.

== Results ==
Kalgoorlie by-election, 1940
Party	Candidate	Votes	%	±%
Labor	Herbert Johnson	18,228	51.4	−48.6
United Australia	Frederick Lee	14,382	40.5	+40.5
Independent	Benjamin Finlay	1,721	4.9	+4.9
United Australia	Carlyle Ferguson	1,140	3.2	+3.2
Total formal votes		35,471	98.4	
Informal votes		567	1.6	
Turnout		36,038	82.0	
Two-party-preferred result
Labor	Herbert Johnson		54.6	−45.4
United Australia	Frederick Lee		45.4	+45.4
Labor hold		Swing	−45.4	
