= Barry Haase =

Australian politician

The Honourable Barry Haase
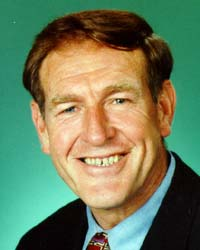
- Haase circa 2002

Administrator of the Australian Indian Ocean Territories
- In office 5 October 2014 – 4 October 2017
- Monarch: Elizabeth II
- Governor-General: Sir Peter Cosgrove
- Preceded by: Jon Stanhope
- Succeeded by: Natasha Griggs

Member of the Australian Parliament for Durack
- In office 21 August 2010 – 5 August 2013
- Preceded by: New seat
- Succeeded by: Melissa Price

Member of the Australian Parliament for Kalgoorlie
- In office 3 October 1998 – 21 August 2010
- Preceded by: Graeme Campbell
- Succeeded by: Division abolished

Personal details
- Born: Barry Wayne Haase; 19 November 1945 (age 80) Southern Cross, Western Australia, Australia
- Party: Liberal

Barry Wayne Haase (born 19 November 1945) is an Australian politician who served in the Australian House of Representatives from 1998 to 2013, representing the divisions of Kalgoorlie and Durack. He was the administrator of the Australian Indian Ocean Territories from 2014 to 2017.

== Early life ==
Barry Haase was born in Southern Cross, Western Australia, Australia, on 19 November 1945. He served in the Royal Australian Navy (RAN) from 1964 to 1967, and worked in the RAN as a caterer. He was a catering manager from 1968 to 1978, and company director in air conditioning and building maintenance from 1978 to 1998.

== Career ==
Haase joined the Liberal Party of Australia in 1987.

In the 1998 election, Haase was elected to the Australian House of Representatives representing the Division of Kalgoorlie. He was reelected in 2001, 2004, and 2007. He was elected from the Division of Durack in the 2010 election. He did not run in the 2013 election.

During Haase's tenure in the house he served on the Aboriginal and Torres Strait Islander Affairs, Members' Interests, Procedure, Industry and Resources, Transport and Regional Services, Employment and Workplace Relations, and Regional Australia committees. He was Shadow Parliamentary Secretary for Infrastructure, Roads and Transport from 2007 to 2008, Shadow Parliamentary Secretary for Roads and Transport in 2008, and Shadow Parliamentary Secretary for Energy and Resources from 2008 to 2009.

Haase replaced Jon Stanhope as the administrator of the Australian Indian Ocean Territories in 2014. He oversaw Christmas Island and Cocos (Keeling) Islands in the position.

== Personal life ==
Haase is married.

== Works cited ==
=== News ===
- "New Christmas Island administrator to be former Liberal MP Barry Haase". The Guardian. 22 September 2014. Archived from the original on 15 August 2025.

=== Web ===
- "Mr Barry Haase". Parliament of Australia. Archived from the original on 16 February 2026.

Parliament of Australia
| Preceded by Graeme Campbell | Member for Kalgoorlie; 1998–2010 | Division abolished |
| New division | Member for Durack; 2010–2013 | Succeeded by Melissa Price |
Government offices
| Preceded by Jon Stanhope | Administrator of the Australian Indian Ocean Territories; 2014–2017 | Succeeded by Natasha Griggs |
