= Charlie Frazer =

Australian politician (1880–1913)

The Honourable Charlie Frazer
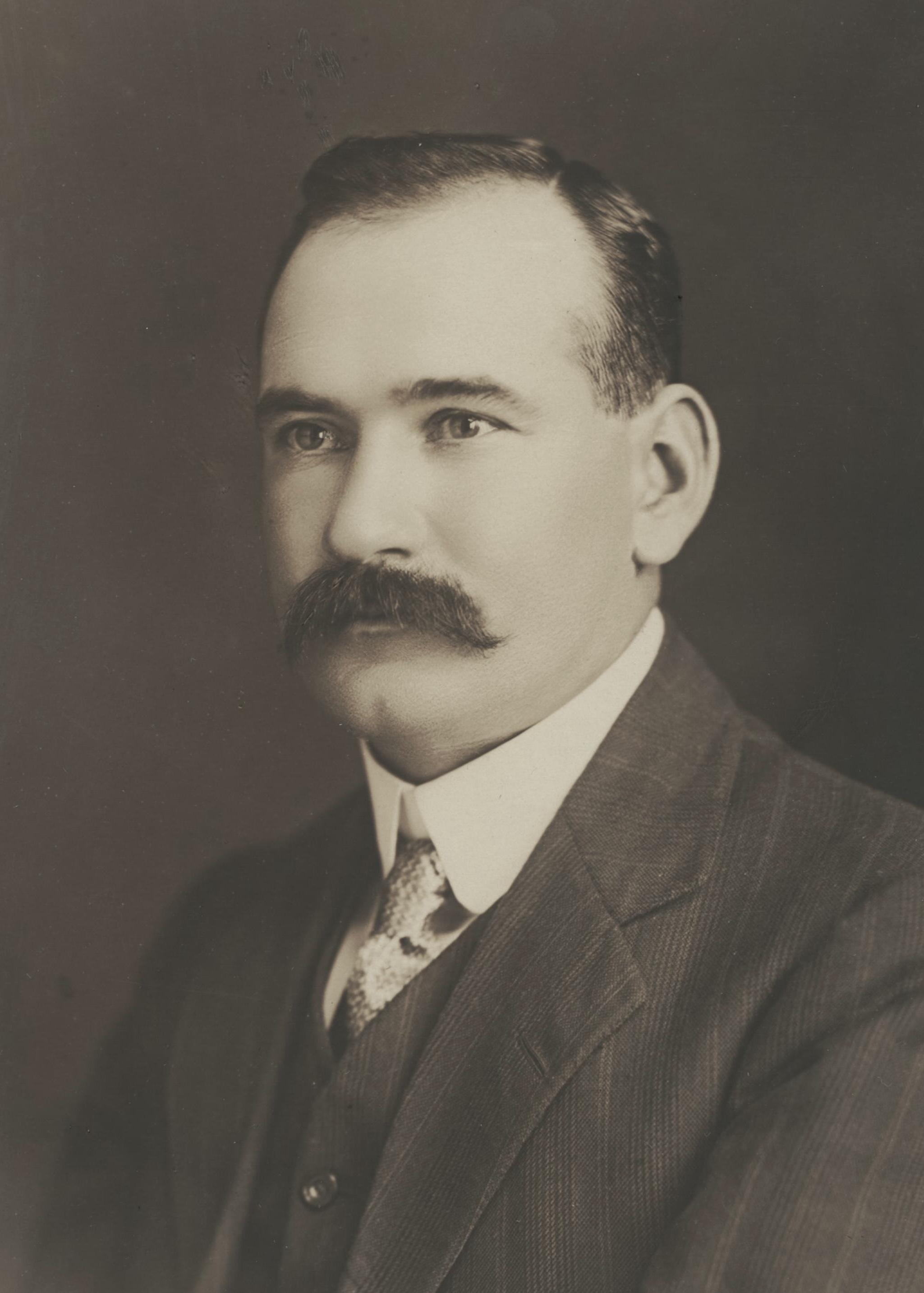

Postmaster-General of Australia
- In office 14 October 1911 – 24 June 1913
- Prime Minister: Andrew Fisher
- Preceded by: Josiah Thomas
- Succeeded by: Agar Wynne

Member of the Australian Parliament for Kalgoorlie
- In office 16 December 1903 – 25 November 1913
- Preceded by: John Kirwan
- Succeeded by: Hugh Mahon

Personal details
- Born: 2 January 1880 Yarrawonga, Victoria
- Died: 25 November 1913 (aged 33) Melbourne, Victoria, Australia
- Party: Australian Labor Party
- Occupation: Engine driver

Charles Edward Frazer (2 January 1880 – 25 November 1913) was an Australian politician. He served in the House of Representatives from 1903 until his death from pneumonia in 1913, aged 33. He was Postmaster-General in the second Fisher Ministry.

== Early life ==
Frazer was born on 2 January 1880 at Pelluebla, a rural locality south of Yarrawonga, Victoria. He was named after "Bonnie Prince Charlie", Charles Edward Stuart. He was the youngest of nine children born to Susannah Atkinson and James Frazer. He had three older brothers and four older sisters, with another sister dying as an infant. His mother was born in Melbourne, while his father was born in Glasgow, Scotland, and arrived in Australia in 1852 during the Victorian gold rush.

Frazer grew up on his father's property of 248 acres (100 ha), where the family lived in wattle and daub huts. He received his only formal education at the Pelluebla South State School, a one-room school that had become overcrowded due to the large size of families in the area. At one stage his father received a fine for keeping the children home from school to work on the farm. The property was subjected to several years of drought and locusts in the early 1890s, and the Frazers also experienced financial difficulties caused by the banking crisis of 1893. By 1895, the family was preparing to move to Mulwala, New South Wales, located opposite Yarrawonga on the other side of the Murray River. Frazer was unwilling to move with them, having come to dislike the monotony of farm work. He made up his mind to move across the country to Western Australia, where gold had been found two years earlier; as a child he had been fascinated by his father's recollections of the 1850s gold rush. He arrived in Fremantle a few months after his 15th birthday, travelling via Sydney.

After arriving in Western Australia, Frazer did not travel on directly to the goldfields but instead took up an apprenticeship with the Western Australian Government Railways at the Fremantle Railway Workshops. He joined the Locomotive Drivers', Firemen's and Cleaners' Union, and after starting in the engine sheds progressed rapidly through the ranks, becoming a fireman after only a few months. He subsequently worked on the extension of the Eastern Goldfields Railway from Southern Cross to Kalgoorlie. Frazer settled in Kalgoorlie's twin town Boulder after the line was completed. He qualified as a locomotive engine driver in 1899, aged 19, and joined the Certified Engine Drivers' Union. He subsequently worked at the Hannan's Star and Boulder Perseverance mines, and occasionally as a driver on the Kalgoorlie–Boulder loop line. He invested his earnings in part-ownership of a Boulder hotel.

Frazer was elected as president of his branch of his union in 1902 and secretary of the Goldfields Trades and Labor Council in 1903. In August 1904 he married Mary Kinnane.

== Municipal politics ==
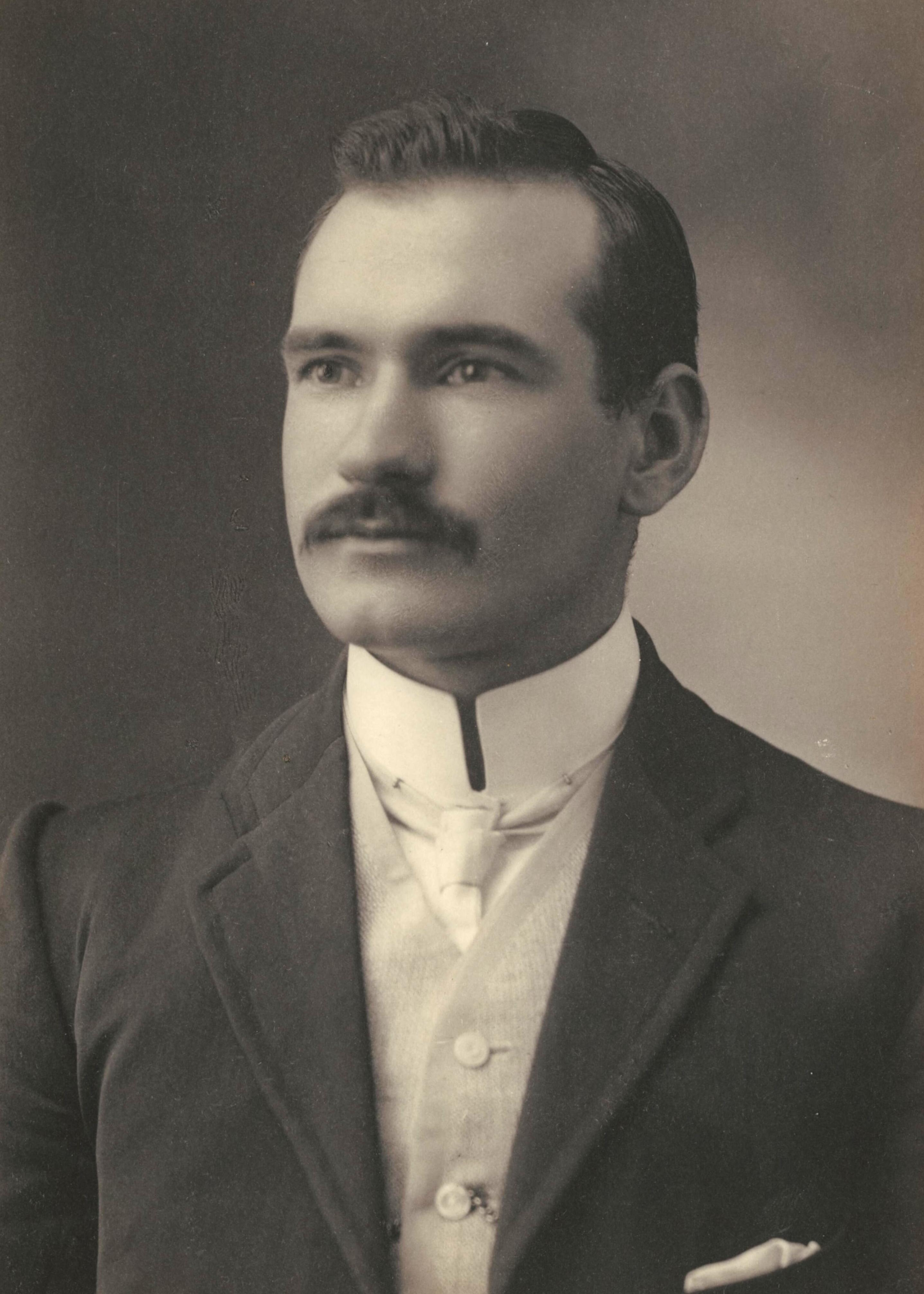
Frazer photographed by Kalgoorlie's Sarony Studio

In November 1902, Frazer was elected to Kalgoorlie Municipal Council.

== Federal politics ==
=== Electoral record ===
In September 1903, Frazer won ALP preselection for the Division of Kalgoorlie, defeating two other candidates. The incumbent member John Kirwan was a Free Trader sympathetic to the labour movement. He had won a large majority at the inaugural 1901 election and had the support of the Kalgoorlie Miner and Western Argus. Kirwan's popularity may have contributed to the smaller number of candidates for ALP preselection, as he was widely expected to win re-election.

According to his friend Richard Crouch, Frazer's campaign was bankrolled with his poker winnings, which included a win of £1,000 in a single night (equivalent to $165,000 in 2022). The Kalgoorlie electorate occupied the south-eastern portion of Western Australia, with most of its population concentrated in Kalgoorlie and Boulder. In the lead-up to the federal election scheduled for 16 December, he began his campaign in the coastal hamlet of Hopetoun, subsequently travelling by ship to Esperance and then riding north to Norseman by bicycle, a five-day journey. His official policy speech was made in Kalgoorlie on 7 November, and included support for White Australia, protectionism, compulsory arbitration, old-age pensions, and direct taxation of the wealthy. Kirwan's campaign suffered from a lack of organisation, which contrasted with the pre-existing ALP and union branches that lent their support to Frazer. At the election, the ALP recorded a large swing throughout Western Australia, winning all three Senate seats and four out of five seats in the House of Representatives. Frazer defeated Kirwan by nearly 3,000 votes, polling almost two-thirds of the total.

After his initial success, Frazer was re-elected with an increased majority at each subsequent election. At the 1906 election he was opposed by William Burton, the mayor of Esperance, on behalf of John Forrest's newly formed Western Australian Party. This had been established as an attempt to harness regionalist and secessionist sentiment to provide a unified organisation behind anti-Labor candidates in Western Australia. However, Burton "swiftly repudiated the party label and spoke in favour of radical policies at meetings which, as he had no organisation, hardly anybody attended". Frazer won a majority of over 5,000 votes and 79 percent of the overall vote, the largest proportion of any candidate nationwide. His margin at the 1910 election increased to over 8,000 votes and 81 percent of the total, again making Kalgoorlie one of the safest seats in the country. His Liberal opponent John Thornett's first campaign meeting was infiltrated by Frazer supporters and turned violent. Thornett was assaulted and hospitalised for several days, after which he withdrew from campaigning. According to Murdoch (2013), "Frazer and the Labor Party had become so popular on the goldfields that it was dangerous to oppose them".

In a redistribution prior to the 1913 election, population decline on the Eastern Goldfields led to the Coolgardie electorate being abolished and split between Kalgoorlie and the new seat of Dampier. The incumbent ALP member for Coolgardie, Hugh Mahon, was defeated in Dampier, but Frazer retained the enlarged Kalgoorlie constituency unopposed.

=== Backbencher ===
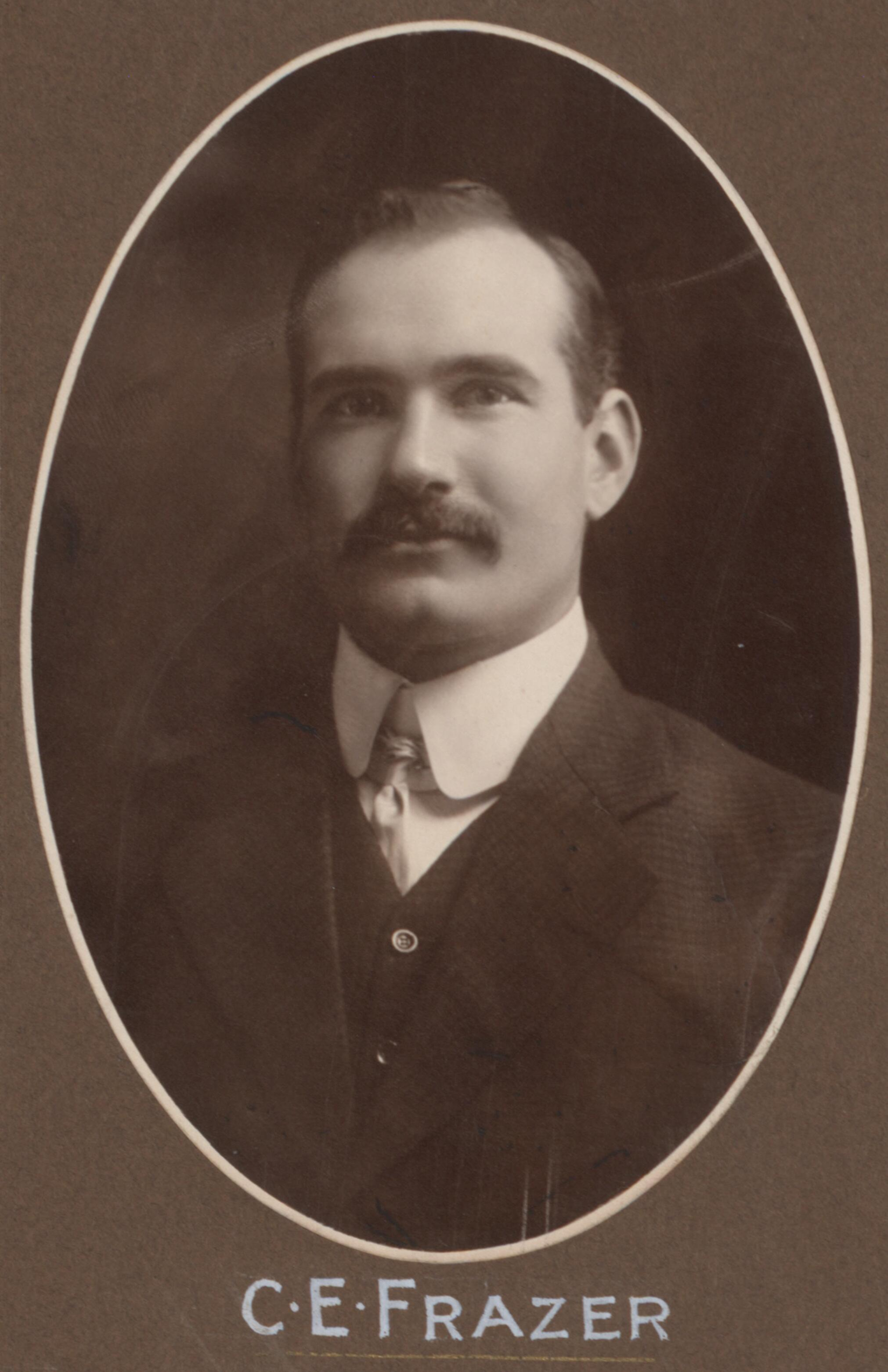
Frazer in 1908

In parliament, he studied law in order to improve his leadership skills, campaigned successfully for the Labor parliamentary caucus to select the ministry when in office and for Labor to stop supporting Protectionist Party governments. Following Labor's success at the 1910 election, he served as honorary minister in the Second Fisher Ministry. In 1911, he acted as Treasurer for several months while Fisher attended the 1911 Imperial Conference and coronation of George V.

=== Frontbencher ===
In October 1911 he was appointed Postmaster-General.

Frazer worked closely with Douglas Mawson to assist in the success of the Australasian Antarctic Expedition. Mawson needed the support of the department in respect of postal mail from Cape Denison and Macquarie Island. The expedition was the first to make provision for wireless telegraphy but the range was considered likely to fall short of the Australian mainland and Mawson sought and obtained the moving forward of the establishment of the Hobart wireless station (Callsign: POH, then VIH) to ensure the communications link.

He was a strong supporter for a uniform stamp for all of Australia, which was still using the old colonial (now state) issues. His first issue, now known to philatelists as the Kangaroo and Map series, was designed by Blamire Young and issued in 1913

== Illness and death ==
Beginning in 1911, Frazer suffered from frequent bouts of ill health. He caught influenza while in Perth in April 1913, and while campaigning a few weeks later suffered a relapse which developed into pneumonia. He was confined to hospital in Leonora for a week, taking another three weeks to fully recover. Frazer spent the day at Flemington Racecourse on 22 November and awoke the following morning with what he believed was a slight cold. He was subsequently examined by a doctor and found to be suffering from severe pneumonia of the left lung. He was taken to a private clinic where he died on the morning of 25 November, aged 33. He was granted a state funeral and buried beside his mother at Melbourne General Cemetery. Andrew Fisher, George Pearce, Josiah Thomas, Joseph Cook, John Forrest, and Agar Wynne served as pall-bearers.

Political offices
Preceded by Josiah Thomas	Postmaster-General; 1911–1913	Succeeded by Agar Wynne
Parliament of Australia
Preceded by John Kirwan	Member for Kalgoorlie; 1903–1913	Succeeded by Hugh Mahon
