= Mick Cotter =

Australian retired politician

Mick Cotter OAM

Member of the Australian Parliament for Kalgoorlie
- In office 13 December 1975 – 18 October 1980
- Preceded by: Fred Collard
- Succeeded by: Graeme Campbell

Personal details
- Born: 21 March 1935 (age 91) Yarram, Victoria
- Party: Liberal
- Occupation: Pastoralist, prospector

John Francis "Mick" Cotter OAM (born 21 March 1935) is a former Australian politician. He was a member of the Liberal Party and served in the House of Representatives from 1975 to 1980, representing the Western Australian seat of Kalgoorlie.

== Early life ==
Cotter was born on 21 March 1935 in Yarram, Victoria. Prior to entering politics he worked for periods as a prospector, miner, contractor and pastoralist, including as manager of Fraser Range Station for a period. He was a member of the Pastoralists' and Graziers' Association of Western Australia.

Cotter joined the Royal Flying Doctor Service in 1951. He served on the national council for 26 years including a period as federal president.

== Politics ==
Cotter served on the Coolgardie Shire Council from 1965 to 1974, including as shire president from 1969.

Cotter was an unsuccessful Liberal Party candidate at the 1974 federal election, losing to the incumbent Australian Labor Party member Fred Collard in the seat of Kalgoorlie. He subsequently defeated Collard at the 1975 election and was re-elected in 1977. He was defeated at the 1980 election by ALP candidate Graeme Campbell.

After his defeat, Cotter was an unsuccessful Liberal preselection candidate prior to the 1981 Curtin by-election.

== Personal life ==
Cotter's wife Judy died in 1981. He retired to Northam.

Parliament of Australia
Preceded by Fred Collard	Member for Kalgoorlie; 1975–1980	Succeeded by Graeme Campbell
