= Australian Nationalist Party =

1958 minor Australian political party

The Australian Nationalist Party (ANP) was a minor Australian political party that contested the 1958 federal election. The ANP unsuccessfully ran five candidates in Queensland: Noel Condie in the division of Bowman, John Morgan in the division of Brisbane, Mervyn Goldstiver in the division of Lilley, Horace Burge in the division of Petrie, and Ronald Edmonds in the division of Ryan. The party's objectives included opposition to communism and socialism, reducing taxes, restoring the proportion of British immigration to 75% of the total, deportation of migrants convicted of certain crimes, increasing social services, restoration of full employment, opposition to salary rises for politicians, and support for states' rights.

== Federal parliament ==
House of Representatives
Election year	# of overall votes	% of overall vote	# of overall seats won	+/–
1958	3,577	0.07(#6/6)	0 / 150	▲0

== See also ==
- Australian nationalism
