= Herbert Johnson (Australian politician) =

Australian politician

The Honourable Herbert Johnson
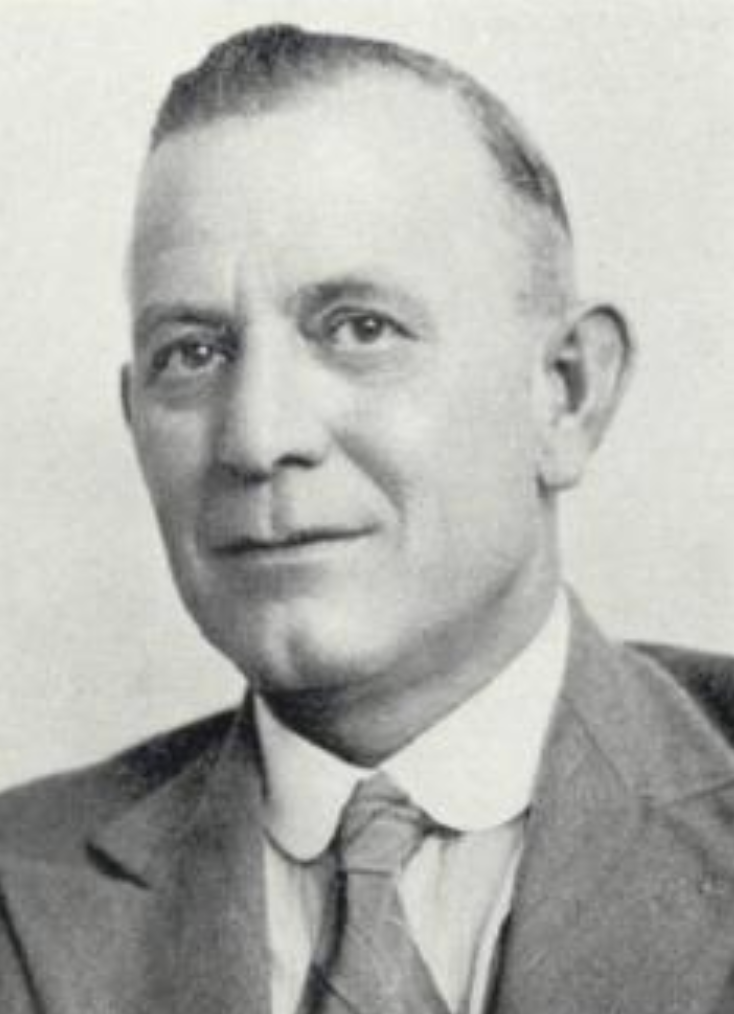

Minister for the Interior
- In office 13 July 1945 – 19 December 1949
- Prime Minister: Ben Chifley
- Preceded by: Joe Collings
- Succeeded by: Philip McBride

Member of the Australian Parliament for Kalgoorlie
- In office 16 November 1940 – 14 October 1958
- Preceded by: Albert Green
- Succeeded by: Peter Browne

Personal details
- Born: 25 October 1889 Northampton, Western Australia
- Died: 10 July 1962 (aged 72) Perth, Western Australia
- Party: Australian Labor Party
- Spouse: Ethel May Lucas
- Occupation: Shearer

Herbert Victor Johnson (25 October 1889 – 10 July 1962) was an Australian politician. He was a member of the Australian Labor Party (ALP) and served in the House of Representatives from 1940 to 1948. He was Minister for the Interior in the Chifley government from 1945 to 1949.

== Early life ==
Johnson was born on 25 October 1889 in Northampton, Western Australia. He was the son of Catherine (née Hartigan) and Arthur Johnson. His father had been transported to Western Australia as a convict in 1867 for theft and later became a farmer.

Johnson's mother committed suicide when he was an infant, leaving nine children. His father later remarried and had a further five children. Johnson received his education at a local convent school. He left school at a young age and began working as a shearer in the Murchison, Gascoyne and North-West. He claimed a world record for sheep shearing of "3761 sheep in 17½ days" in 1914.

== Labour movement ==
Johnson joined the Australian Workers' Union (AWU) in 1908, the first Western Australian shearer to join the union after it organised the shearers. As an AWU organizer, he worked hard to maintain the conditions of pastoral workers during the 1920s and 1930s. He was secretary of the Geraldton branch of the Australian Labor Party from 1920 to 1934. In 1936, he was elected state secretary of the AWU and moved to the Perth suburb of Highgate.

== Political career ==
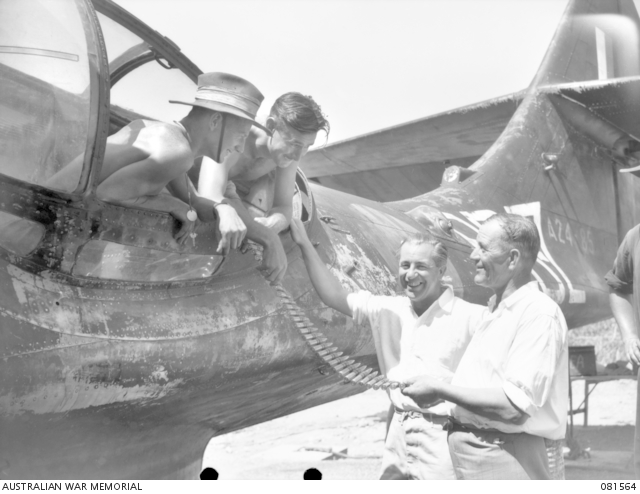
Johnson (right) and Harold Holt meet No. 20 Squadron RAAF Catalina groundcrew at Cairns, October 1944

In 1940, Johnson won a by-election for Kalgoorlie. On the death of John Curtin in July 1945, he was elected by the parliamentary caucus to the ensuing vacancy in the ministry and he was appointed Minister for the Interior—which among other things was responsible for northern development—and Assistant-Minister for Works and Housing from 1945 to 1946. He was chairman of the Australian War Memorial's board of management from 1945 to 1949 and gained funding for its expansion to house collections from World War II. His appointment as minister lapsed with the defeat of the Chifley government at the 1949 election.

In 1948, as interior minister, Johnson and his department opposed attempts to desegregate the North Australian Workers' Union (NAWU) and allow the admission of "full-blood" Indigenous Australians. A departmental memorandum stated that desegregation of the union would make it more difficult to enforce the Aborigines Ordinance 1918.

He was unhappy with H. V. Evatt's leadership of the party during the 1955 split that led to the creation of the Democratic Labor Party and publicly expressed his concerns in 1957. This led the party to withhold endorsement of his candidacy at future elections, although he had already decided to retire at the 1958 election.

== Personal life ==
In 1913, Johnson married Ethel Lucas. He died in 1962 at Royal Perth Hospital, survived by his wife, two of his three sons and three of his four daughters.

Political offices
Preceded by Joe Collings	Minister for the Interior; 1945–1949	Succeeded by Philip McBride
Parliament of Australia
Preceded by Albert Green	Member for Kalgoorlie; 1940–1958	Succeeded by Peter Browne
