= Graeme Campbell (politician) =

Australian politician (1939–2025)

Member of the Australian Parliament for Kalgoorlie
- In office 18 October 1980 – 3 October 1998
- Preceded by: Mick Cotter
- Succeeded by: Barry Haase

Leader of the Australia First Party
- In office June 1996 – June 2001
- Preceded by: Position established

Personal details
- Born: 12 August 1939 Abingdon, Oxfordshire, England
- Died: 16 August 2025 (aged 86) Kalgoorlie, Western Australia, Australia
- Party: Labor (1980–1995); Independent (1995–1996; 2004–2021); Australia First Reform (1996); Australia First (1996–2001); One Nation (2001–2004); Liberal (2021–2025)
- Spouse: Michele Lelievre

Graeme Campbell (12 August 1939 – 16 August 2025) was an Australian far-right politician. He represented the seat of Kalgoorlie in the House of Representatives from 1980 to 1998 as a member of the Australian Labor Party. He founded the Australia First Party in 1996, before leaving in 2001 to join One Nation and later becoming a member of the Liberal Party.

== Early life ==
Campbell was born on 12 August 1939 in Abingdon, Oxfordshire, England, and immigrated to Australia as a child. He was educated at Urrbrae Agricultural High School in South Australia. In 1972, Campbell met his future wife, French-Australian Michele Lelievre, at a sheep station in the Nullarbor Plain.

== Political career ==
Campbell worked in a range of occupations before entering federal parliament in October 1980 as the Labor member for Kalgoorlie.

Considered a maverick, he was an ardent supporter of the mining industry, campaigned against the Hawke government's introduction of a gold tax and crossed the floor in 1988, and was also a vocal critic of the Mabo decision regarding native title in Australia and sanctions on the apartheid regime in South Africa, and a proponent of uranium mining. In October 1993, and again in May 1995, he delivered a speech at the national seminar of the Australian League of Rights, a far-right group for which he was believed to hold sympathies, and in by-elections in Mackellar and Warringah (safe Liberal seats on the Northern Beaches of Sydney) in 1994, he urged electors to vote for Australians Against Further Immigration (AAFI).

After numerous run-ins with the Labor leadership and considerable media attention to his exploits, his Labor preselection for the seat of Kalgoorlie was revoked and he resigned from the Labor party in December 1995. He continued to sit in parliament as an independent, and was reelected as an independent in the 1996 election, when he only received 35% of the primary vote, but defeated the Labor candidate, former Deputy Premier of Western Australia Ian Taylor, on Liberal preferences.

In June 1996, Campbell founded the Australia First Party, but was officially reckoned as an independent. He was defeated for reelection at the 1998 federal election after being eliminated on the seventh count. Campbell blamed his loss on Australia First being eclipsed by One Nation. In 2009, he claimed that, if not for the presence of a One Nation candidate, he would have picked up an additional 8.5% of the vote, which would have been enough to keep him in the race.

He remained Australia First's leader until June 2001, when he left the party to stand (unsuccessfully) as a One Nation Senate candidate in Western Australia. In 2004, he attempted unsuccessfully to regain his old federal seat as an independent. He stood for the Senate in Western Australia at the 2007 federal election as an independent, but only achieved 0.13% of the vote.

In 2021, Campbell joined the Liberal Party. He opposed the Indigenous Voice to Parliament at the 2023 referendum.

== Death ==
Campbell died at a hospital in Kalgoorlie, on 16 August 2025, after a stroke.

== Bibliography ==
- Graeme Campbell and Mark Uhlmann. Australia Betrayed: How Australian democracy has been undermined and our naive trust betrayed, Foundation Press, Perth, 1995. ISBN 1-875778-02-0

Parliament of Australia
Preceded by Mick Cotter	Member for Kalgoorlie; 1980–1998	Succeeded by Barry Haase
