= Fred Collard =

Australian politician

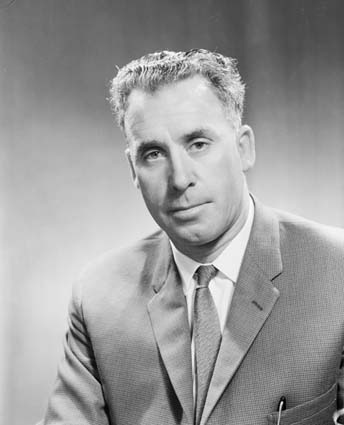

Member of the Australian Parliament for Kalgoorlie
- In office 9 December 1961 – 13 December 1975
- Preceded by: Peter Browne
- Succeeded by: Mick Cotter

Personal details
- Born: 6 June 1912 Beverley, Western Australia, Australia
- Died: 1 December 1986 (aged 74)
- Party: Labor
- Occupation: Goldminer, union official

Frederick Walter Collard (6 June 1912 – 1 December 1986) was an Australian politician and trade unionist. He was a member of the Australian Labor Party (ALP) and served in the House of Representatives from 1961 to 1975, representing the Western Australian seat of Kalgoorlie. He was a gold miner and Australian Workers' Union official before entering parliament.

== Early life ==
Collard was born on 6 June 1912 in Beverley, Western Australia. He was raised in Kokeby, where his father Henry Collard was a farmer, but went into mining after leaving school.

Collard enlisted in the Royal Australian Air Force (RAAF) in August 1942 and was posted to the RAAF School of Technical Training and Engineering in Perth. He transferred to the No. 1 Aircraft Depot RAAF in Victoria in April 1943, where he remained until 1945. He was discharged in February 1946 with the rank of leading aircraftman.

Collard returned to mining after the war's end, settling in Boulder and working at the North Kalgurli Gold Mine. In 1951 he was employed by the Australian Workers' Union (AWU) as a full-time organiser. He was appointed organising secretary of the AWU's mining division the following year. In 1955 he represented the AWU at the state arbitration court as it sought a new award for the gold mining industry.

== Politics ==
Collard was elected to the House of Representatives at the 1961 federal election, winning the seat of Kalgoorlie for the Australian Labor Party from the incumbent Liberal MP Peter Browne. Kalgoorlie was the last seat to be called, with Collard's margin of victory being less than 500 votes.

In parliament, Collard was a strong advocate for the gold-mining industry. In the early 1970s he lobbied the Gorton and McMahon governments for the subsidy payable to gold miners to be increased, on the grounds that the industry would otherwise die out and lead to large-scale unemployment in his constituency. After the ALP's victory at the 1972 federal election, Collard came into conflict with Prime Minister Gough Whitlam and federal treasurer Frank Crean on a number of occasions over their attempts to remove the subsidy. In 1973, he successfully within the ALP caucus for the government to reverse its removal of tax exemptions on gold mining profits.

Collard served on a number of parliamentary committees, including as a member of the Joint Statutory Committee on Public Accounts from 1967 to 1975 and the House Standing Committee on Aboriginal Affairs from 1973 to 1975. In 1968, he spoke in parliament on the difficulties Aboriginal Australians faced in obtaining social services and welfare payments, requesting that the Department of Social Services increase its presence in his constituency. Collard was re-elected in Kalgoorlie on five occasions, eventually losing his seat to Liberal candidate Mick Cotter in the ALP's landslide defeat at the 1975 federal election. His defeat was attributed in part to the Whitlam government's resources policy and its perceived failure to support the gold-mining industry.

== Personal life ==
In 1940 Collard married Irene Jackson. He died on 1 December 1986, aged 74.

Parliament of Australia
Preceded by Peter Browne	Member for Kalgoorlie; 1961 – 1975	Succeeded by Mick Cotter
