= Division of Coolgardie =

Former Australian federal electoral division

Coolgardie Australian House of Representatives Division
- Created: 5 December 1900
- Abolished: 1 February 1913
- Namesake: Coolgardie

The Division of Coolgardie was an Australian electoral division in Western Australia.

The division was one of the original 65 divisions to be contested at the first federal election in 1901. It was one of five electorates created by the Federal House of Representatives Western Australian Electorates Act 1900, an act of the parliament of Western Australia.

The division was named for the gold-mining centre of Coolgardie, on which it was based. It was a safe seat for the Australian Labor Party and was held by Hugh Mahon throughout its existence. It was abolished in a redistribution prior to the 1913 federal election and was effectively replaced by the new Division of Dampier.

== Members ==
Image	Member	Party	Term	Notes
	Hugh Mahon (1857–1931)	Labor	29 March 1901 – 31 May 1913	Served as minister under Watson and Fisher. Failed to win the Division of Dampier when Coolgardie was abolished in 1913. Later elected to the Division of Kalgoorlie in 1913.
