= Hugh Mahon =

Australian politician (1857–1931)

The Honourable Hugh Mahon
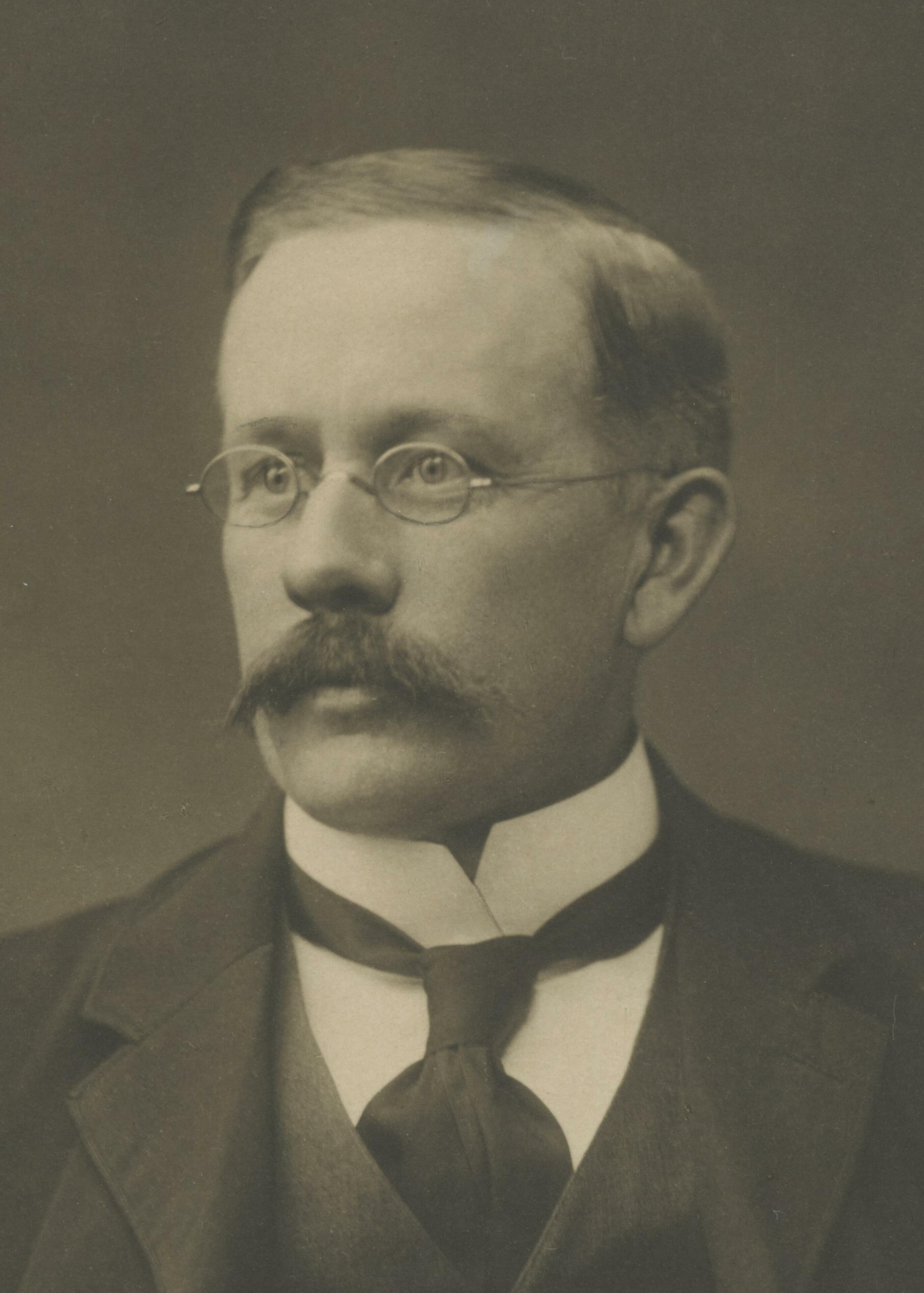

Minister for External Affairs
- In office 9 December 1914 – 14 November 1916
- Prime Minister: Andrew Fisher; Billy Hughes
- Preceded by: John Arthur
- Succeeded by: Portfolio abolished

Minister for Home Affairs
- In office 13 November 1908 – 2 June 1909
- Prime Minister: Andrew Fisher
- Preceded by: John Keating
- Succeeded by: George Fuller

Postmaster-General of Australia
- In office 27 April 1904 – 17 August 1904
- Prime Minister: Chris Watson
- Preceded by: Philip Fysh
- Succeeded by: Sydney Smith

Member of the Australian Parliament for Kalgoorlie
- In office 13 December 1919 – 12 November 1920
- Preceded by: Edward Heitmann
- Succeeded by: George Foley
- In office 22 December 1913 – 5 May 1917
- Preceded by: Charlie Frazer
- Succeeded by: Edward Heitmann

Member of the Australian Parliament for Coolgardie
- In office 29 March 1901 – 31 May 1913
- Preceded by: New seat
- Succeeded by: Division abolished

Personal details
- Born: 6 January 1857 Killurin, King's County, Ireland
- Died: 28 August 1931 (aged 74) Ringwood, Victoria, Australia
- Party: Labor
- Spouse: Mary Alice L'Estrange
- Occupation: Newspaper owner, politician, business man

Hugh Mahon (6 January 1857 – 28 August 1931) was an Australian politician. He was a member of the Australian Labor Party (ALP) and held ministerial office in the party's earliest governments. He served terms as Postmaster-General (1904), Minister for Home Affairs (1908–1909), and Minister for External Affairs (1914–1916). However, Mahon is chiefly known as the only person to be expelled from the Parliament of Australia, for making "seditious and disloyal utterances" about the British Empire. He failed to win his seat back at the by-election.

== Early life ==
Mahon was born at Killurin, near Tullamore (at that time in King's County, now in County Offaly, Ireland) and migrated in 1869 with his family to Canada and the United States, where he learned the printing trade. He returned to Ireland in about 1880 and worked as editor of the New Ross Standard, reporting on the infamous Shanbogh killing as well as helping to organise the defence of the two accused. He was actively involved in the boycotting campaign of the Irish National Land League and was imprisoned in 1881, in Kilmainham Gaol, along with other Irish National Land League leaders, including Charles Stewart Parnell, but was released due to ill-health. He emigrated to Australia in 1882 to avoid re-arrest and helped to organise the Australian tour of the Irish nationalist leaders John and William Redmond in 1883. He then worked for newspapers in Goulburn and Sydney, before acquiring a newspaper in Gosford. In 1888 he married Mary Alice L'Estrange of Melbourne. After failing to be elected to the seat of Wollombi at the 1891 NSW parliamentary elections, Mahon sold his newspaper and moved to Melbourne, where he worked for the Australian Mining Standard. In 1895, he moved to the Western Australian goldfields and started a newspaper, The Menzies Miner, at the mining town of Menzies.

== Political career ==
=== Colonial politics ===
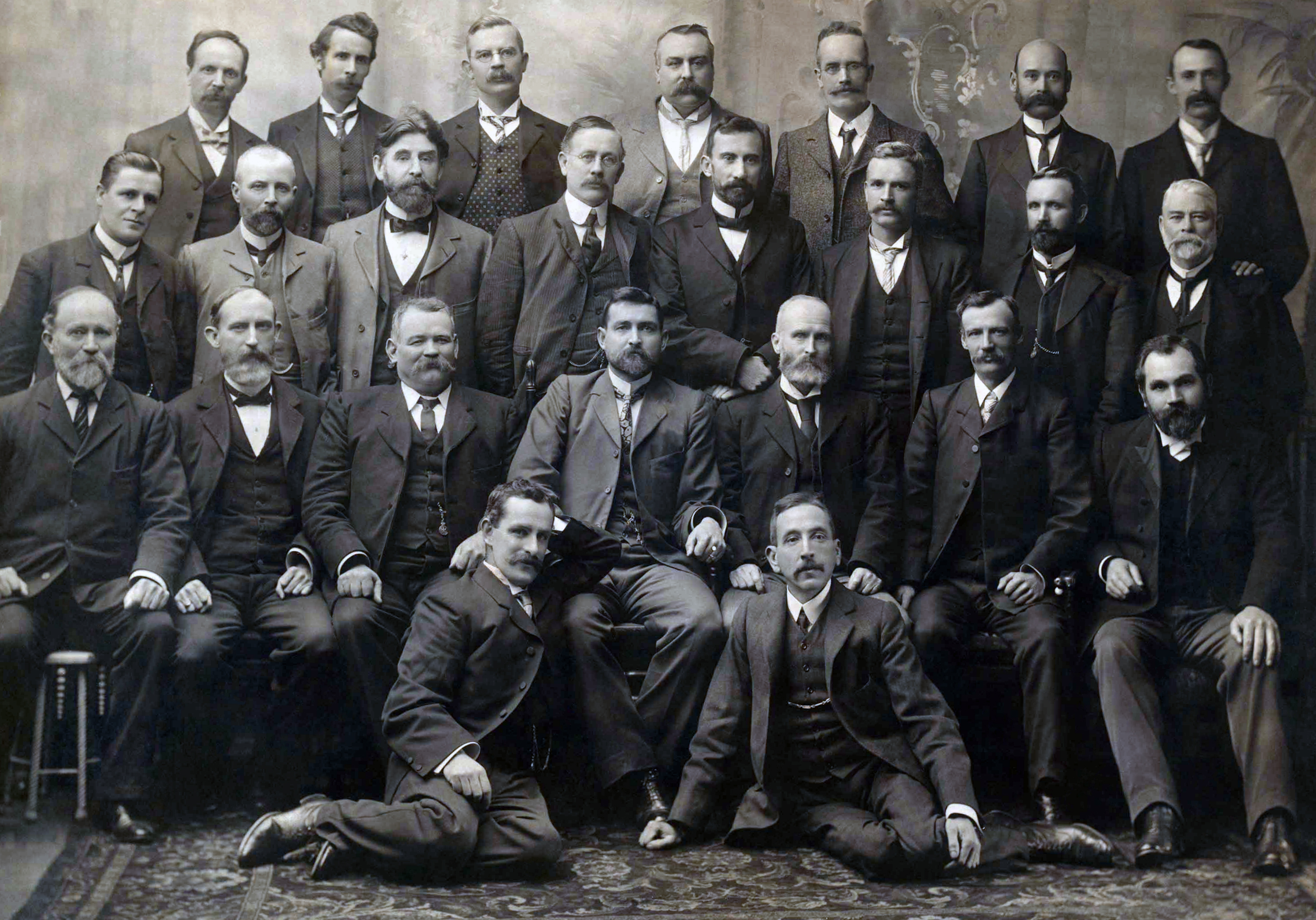
Group photograph of all Federal Labour Party MPs elected at the inaugural 1901 election, including Chris Watson, Andrew Fisher, Billy Hughes, Frank Tudor, and King O'Malley. Mahon is in the middle row standing fourth from left.

In 1897 Mahon stood unsuccessfully for the state seat of North Coolgardie, and the following year he was appointed editor of the Kalgoorlie Sun, a salacious newspaper similar to John Norton's Truth, in which he regularly denounced the Forrest government for alleged corrupt practices. Mahon's notoriety as a fighting editor helped him to win the new federal seat of Coolgardie at the 1901 election for Labour.

=== Federal politics ===
Upon entry into federal parliament, Mahon gained a reputation for savage wit and bitter sarcasm. He advocated a humanitarian approach to colonial governance, calling for a royal commission into the treatment of Aboriginal people in WA and for an amendment to the Constitution to give the federal parliament power to pass laws relating to Aboriginal people in the states, an amendment not realised until the 1967 referendum. Yet, as historian Jane Lydon notes, Mahon did not see Aboriginal people as equals, advocating "sympathetic but undeviating treatment." He was also a strong supporter of the White Australia Policy. In 1905 Mahon helped shepherd through both houses of parliament resolutions in support of Irish home rule. Thereafter he became increasingly identified as an advocate of Irish nationalism. In 1907 Cardinal Patrick Moran invited him to deliver the St Patrick's Day address in Sydney. In 1909 he was a key player in the St Patrick's Day celebrations in Melbourne, addressed by the Governor General. In July 1910 he moved a resolution in the House of Representatives requesting the new king George V to omit from the Coronation Oath references offensive to Catholics.

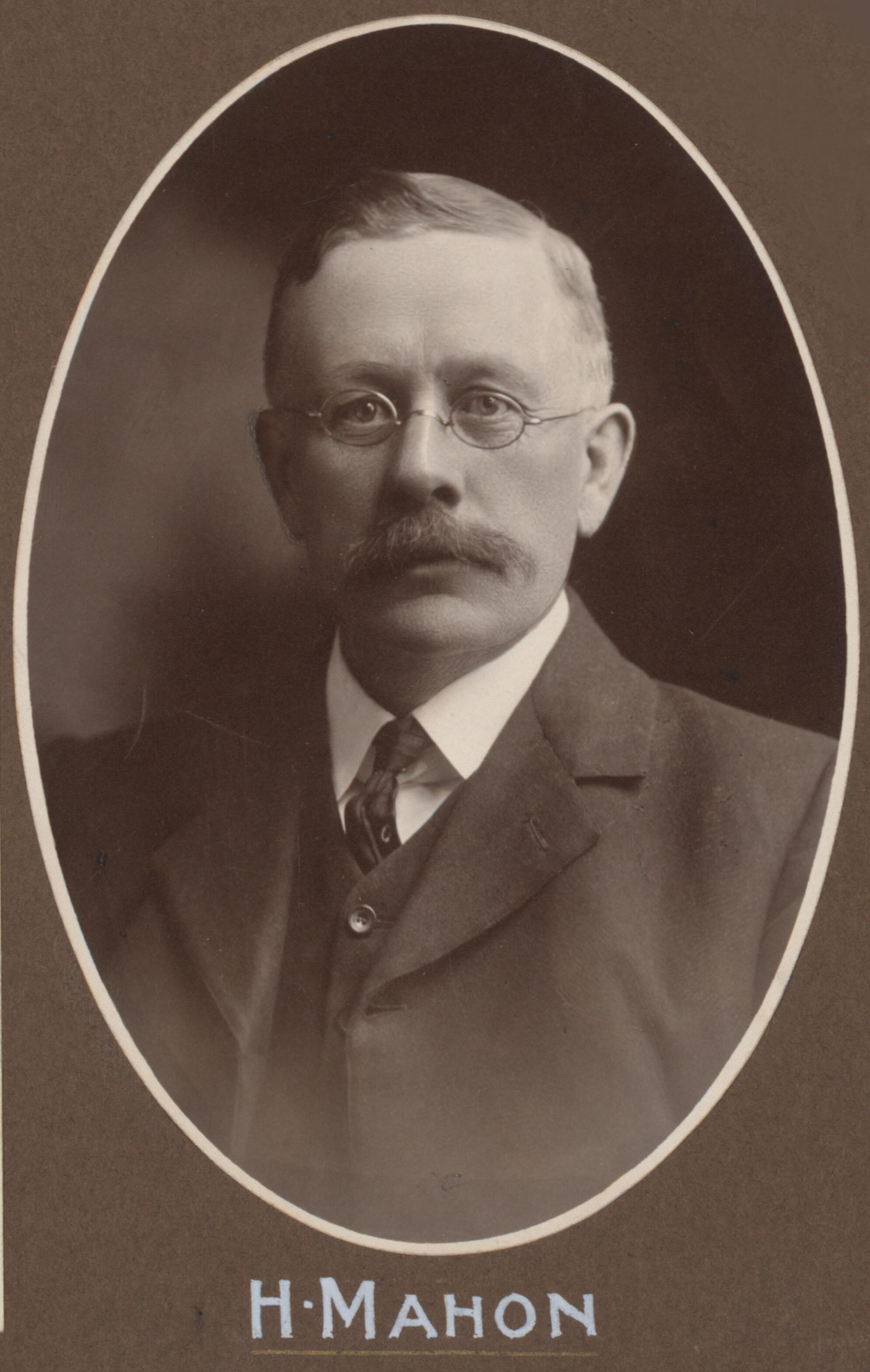
Mahon in 1908

He was Postmaster-General in the Watson government in 1904 and Minister for Home Affairs in the Fisher government of 1908–09. In the latter role he directed the District Surveyor, Charles Scrivener, to examine the Yass-Canberra district to determine the most suitable place for the seat of government.

In 1913, the seat of Coolgardie was abolished and partly replaced by Dampier, for which he stood unsuccessfully. He re-entered Parliament in the seat of Kalgoorlie; following the death of the incumbent, Charlie Frazer, a by-election was called, but at the close of nominations on 22 December 1913 Mahon was the sole candidate and was declared elected unopposed. Appointed an assistant minister after the 1914 elections, Mahon became Minister for External Affairs in December 1914 on the death of John Arthur.

Mahon held that position until the Labor Party split in November 1916 over conscription and he resigned from Prime Minister Billy Hughes' cabinet. Although not opposed in principle to conscription, Mahon believed it was not justified at that particular time. He kept a low profile during the referendum debate, but in the last week of campaigning, an article claiming that he supported a Yes vote forced him to clarify his position. His refusal to endorse the government's conscription proposal soured his relations with Hughes. At the 'khaki election' in 1917 Mahon lost his seat, but he won it back in 1919.

=== Expulsion from parliament ===
As the Irish War of Independence, which had begun in 1919, intensified, Mahon gradually moved from a position of support for home rule to one of support for Sinn Féin. After the death in October 1920 of the Irish nationalist Terence MacSwiney, who had been on hunger strike, Mahon attacked British policy in Ireland at an open-air meeting in Melbourne on 7 November, claiming that the sobs of MacSwiney's widow would one day shake the foundations of "this bloody and accursed Empire". On 11 November the Prime Minister Billy Hughes moved to expel him, and early the following morning the House of Representatives passed a resolution that Mahon had made "seditious and disloyal utterances at a public meeting", and was "guilty of conduct unfitting him to remain a member of this House and inconsistent with the oath of allegiance which he has taken as a member of this House".

According to Mahon's biographer Jeff Kildea, it is this singular event for which he is mostly remembered "despite his long and eventful career in journalism, business and politics both in Ireland and Australia".

Mahon failed to win back his seat at the December 1920 Kalgoorlie by-election, suffering a 3.5 percent swing.

When the Labor Party returned to government in 1929, Mahon sought to have his expulsion motion rescinded, but there was little interest in the caucus to revisit the matter. In 1984 a joint select committee of the parliament criticised his expulsion as an "abuse of power by a partisan vote", and in 1987 legislation was passed removing the parliament's power to expel its members. In 2016, Labor MP Graham Perrett moved a private member's motion in Parliament to recognise that Mahon's expulsion was unjust and a misuse of power then invested by the House. The motion lapsed. In 2020, during the centenary year of Mahon's expulsion, a further attempt was being made to have the parliament acknowledge the injustice done to Mahon.

Mahon's expulsion is often referred to in the media when a member of parliament misbehaves and calls are made to expel that person.

== Later life ==
After leaving parliament, Mahon continued to work as the managing director of the Catholic Church Property Insurance Co., the insurance company he had established in 1912 at the request of the Catholic bishops. In December 1921 he sailed to Europe for the Irish Race Convention in Paris. However, struck down by illness, he missed the conference. After recovering, he went to Rome and had an audience with Pope Pius XI before visiting Ireland. This was the only time he returned to his native land after leaving it forty years earlier. While in Ireland, Mahon attended a large family reunion near Tullamore, and gave a controversial interview to the Irish press in support of the Anglo-Irish Treaty in which he criticised the Irish Labour Party. On returning to Australia in June 1922, Mahon expected to be appointed Consul General for Ireland, but the Civil War put an end to that.

== Death ==
In August 1931, while in Sydney for a meeting of the board of the Catholic Church Property Insurance Co, Mahon fell ill, and on his return to Melbourne succumbed to the lung disease that had plagued him all his life. He died on 28 August 1931, and is buried in Box Hill Cemetery. He was survived by his wife and four children. Debate in parliament on the usual condolence motion was interrupted when a Country Party member, Roland Green, a veteran of the war who had lost a leg in the conflict, stormed out of the chamber after declaring he could not support the motion because of Mahon's attack on the Empire. To Green and others like him, Mahon's words still rankled a decade or more after the event. Not all agreed. Another ardent Irish nationalist, the Catholic Archbishop of Melbourne, Daniel Mannix, said of him, "The late Mr Hugh Mahon was [my] personal and honoured friend. ... The late Mr Mahon had been a good Irishman, a good Australian and an exemplary Catholic".

Political offices
Preceded by Philip Fysh	Postmaster-General; 1904	Succeeded by Sydney Smith
Preceded by John Keating	Minister for Home Affairs; 1908–1909	Succeeded by George Fuller
Preceded by John Arthur	Minister for External Affairs; 1914–1916	Title abolished
Parliament of Australia
New division	Member for Coolgardie; 1901–1913	Division abolished
Preceded by Charlie Frazer	Member for Kalgoorlie; 1913–1917	Succeeded by Edward Heitmann
Preceded by Edward Heitmann	Member for Kalgoorlie; 1919–1920	Succeeded by George Foley
