= Peter Browne (Australian politician) =

Australian politician (1924–2000)

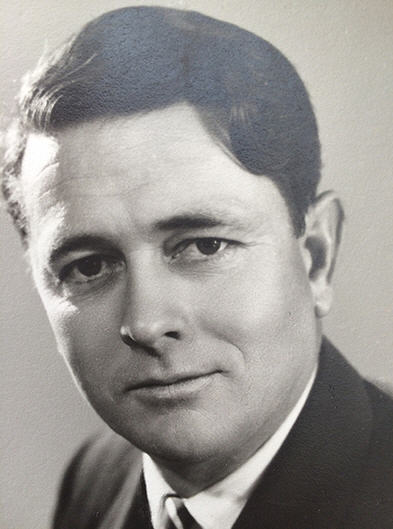
- Photograph of Peter Grahame Browne, taken for the Australian Federal Parliamentary Handbook, 1960.

Member of the Australian Parliament for Kalgoorlie
- In office 22 November 1958 – 9 December 1961
- Preceded by: Herbert Johnson
- Succeeded by: Fred Collard

Personal details
- Born: 15 July 1924 Sydney, New South Wales, Australia
- Died: 11 September 2000 (aged 76) Fremantle, Western Australia
- Party: Liberal Party of Australia
- Spouse: Margaret Browne

Peter Grahame Browne (15 July 1924 – 11 September 2000) was an Australian Federal politician. Born in Sydney, he enlisted in 1940 and served with the 2nd AIF as a Gunner in the 14th Heavy Anti-aircraft Battery in Darwin during the Bombing of Darwin from February 1942. In 1943 he transferred to the RAAF to undertake pilot training through the Empire Air Training Scheme, initially at 2 Initial Training School (2 I.T.S.) Bradfield Park, Sydney. He was medically discharged from the RAAF after suffering from mastoiditis.

Not yet satisfied with his contribution to the war, Browne signed-up with the US Army Small Ships Section in June 1944 where he served on ships directly supporting the Philippines Campaign, particularly the Battle of Leyte Gulf and Invasion of Lingayen Gulf. In addition to his WWII Australian Service and Campaign medals, he was awarded US Service Medals, including the Asiatic–Pacific Campaign Medal with Campaign Stars for the Battle of Leyte and the Battle of Luzon and the Philippines Liberation Medal and Philippines Presidential Unit Citation.

After the war Browne became a drover and horse breaker, as well as an organiser for the Liberal Party. In 1958, he was elected to the Australian House of Representatives as the Liberal member for Kalgoorlie, in Western Australia. He held the seat until his defeat in 1961. He then served as the Principal Private Secretary to the Treasurer, Harold Holt, in the Menzies government.

Browne died in Fremantle in 2000 and was remembered in the House of Representatives. His wife, Margaret, died in 2023 at the age of 91. He is survived by his three children, Rosemary, Stephen and Peter.

Parliament of Australia
Preceded by Herbert Johnson	Member for Kalgoorlie; 1958–1961	Succeeded by Fred Collard
