= Division of Kalgoorlie =

Former Australian federal electoral division

Coordinates: 26°10′S 122°30′E

Kalgoorlie Australian House of Representatives Division
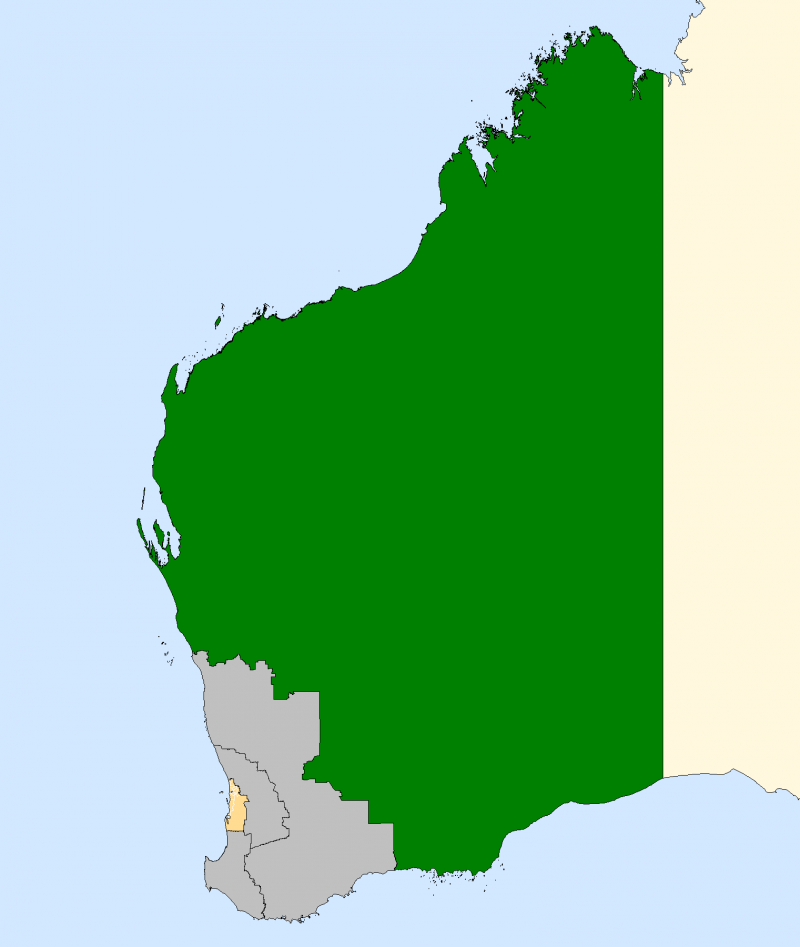
- Division of Kalgoorlie (green) in Western Australia as at the 2007 election
- Created: 1901
- Abolished: 2010
- Namesake: Kalgoorlie
- Electors: 80,773
- Area: 2,295,354 km^{2} (886,241.1 sq mi)
- Demographic: Rural

The Division of Kalgoorlie was an Australian electoral division in the state of Western Australia, named after the city of Kalgoorlie. The division was proclaimed in 1900 as one of the original 65 divisions to be contested at the first federal election in 1901. In its final form, before it was abolished in 2010, it covered most of the land area of Western Australia, with a size of 2,295,354 square kilometres (886,241 sq mi)—over 90 percent of the state's landmass (an area the size of France, Spain, Germany, Italy, Poland and the United Kingdom combined).

It included the Goldfields–Esperance, Gascoyne, Pilbara and Kimberley regions of Western Australia, in addition to the eastern and far northern parts of the Mid-West region, and the town of Merredin. At a time, it was the largest single-member electorate by area in the world—almost a third of the continent.

== History ==
Kalgoorlie was one of the original 65 divisions to be contested at the first federal election in 1901. It was one of five electorates created by the Federal House of Representatives Western Australian Electorates Act 1900, an act of the parliament of Western Australia. It was significantly enlarged in a redistribution prior to the 1922 federal election, when the Division of Dampier was abolished and effectively merged into Kalgoorlie.

For most of its history, Kalgoorlie was split between strongly pro-Labor territory in the mining regions and more conservative-leaning farming areas, and, from the 1980s, Labor also benefited from the support of indigenous voters in the northern parts of the electorate. Unlike seats in the eastern states with similar demographics, it was not usually reckoned as a bellwether for winning government—primarily because most elections have already been decided by the time the first returns come in from the state. The Liberals (and their predecessors) and Labor alternated for long spells in the seat. As evidence of how little it was affected by trends in the rest of the country, all but one of its members from 1922 onward spent at least one term in opposition.

For most of the time from 1922 to 1995, the conservative farming areas were usually swamped by Labor support in mining towns. Labor lost the electorate only when its support in Western Australia collapsed, such as in the late 1970s due to the regional backlash against the Whitlam government. In 1995, however, sitting Labor MP Graeme Campbell was expelled from the party. He retained the electorate at the 1996 election, but in 1998 was defeated by Liberal Barry Haase, who held the seat until its abolition despite vigorous challenges from Labor. Haase benefited from the popularity of the Liberal Party in Western Australia during this period, as well as a sharp decline in Labor support in the city of Kalgoorlie, previously a Labor stronghold for the better part of a century. When Haase was re-elected in 2007, it was the only time that Labor had won government at an election without winning Kalgoorlie.

The division was abolished at the 2008 redistribution, effective from the 2010 federal election. Due to a drop in population, Kalgoorlie needed to increase in size. However, all of the proposed maps would have made it all but impossible to draw O'Connor, the other large country seat in Western Australia, in a way that it would have any rational basis. Ultimately, the Australian Electoral Commission decided to abolish Kalgoorlie. Most of the northern portion of its territory was transferred to the new Division of Durack, while the southern portion (including the city of Kalgoorlie) was absorbed into O'Connor. Haase transferred to Durack. Upon the abolition of Kalgoorlie, the title of second-largest single member electoral constituency in the world passed to Nunavut in Canada; the largest at the time was, and remains, Yakutsk constituency of the Russian State Duma.

None of its members were able to retire at the time of their choosing, for they either lost the seat in an election, lost party preselection, died in office, or were expelled from Parliament (Hugh Mahon). When the seat was abolished, its last member Barry Haase moved to the seat of Durack to continue his parliamentary career.

== Members ==
Image	Member	Party	Term	Notes
	John Kirwan (1869–1949)	Free Trade	29 March 1901 – 16 December 1903	Lost seat. Later elected to the Western Australian Legislative Council in 1908
	Charlie Frazer (1880–1913)	Labor	16 December 1903 – 25 November 1913	Served as minister under Fisher. Died in office
	Hugh Mahon (1857–1931)	Labor	22 December 1913 – 5 May 1917	Previously held the Division of Coolgardie. Served as minister under Fisher and Hughes. Lost seat
	Edward Heitmann (1878–1934)	Nationalist	5 May 1917 – 13 December 1919	Previously held the Western Australian Legislative Assembly seat of Geraldton. Lost seat
	Hugh Mahon (1857–1931)	Labor	13 December 1919 – 12 November 1920	Expelled from Parliament over opposition towards British policy in Ireland. Lost seat in subsequent by-election
	George Foley (1872–1945)	Nationalist	18 December 1920 – 16 December 1922	Previously held the Western Australian Legislative Assembly seat of Mount Leonora. Lost seat
	Albert Green (1869–1940)	Labor	16 December 1922 – 2 October 1940	Previously held the Western Australian Legislative Assembly seat of Kalgoorlie. Served as minister under Scullin. Died in office
	Herbert Johnson (1889–1962)	Labor	16 November 1940 – 14 October 1958	Served as minister under Chifley. Lost preselection and retired
	Peter Browne (1924–2000)	Liberal	22 November 1958 – 9 December 1961	Lost seat
	Fred Collard (1912–1986)	Labor	9 December 1961 – 13 December 1975	Lost seat
	Mick Cotter (1935–)	Liberal	13 December 1975 – 18 October 1980	Lost seat
	Graeme Campbell (1939–2025)	Labor	18 October 1980 – 30 November 1995	Lost seat
	Graeme Campbell (1939–2025)	Independent	30 November 1995 – June 1996	Lost seat
	Graeme Campbell (1939–2025)	Australia First	June 1996 – 1 July 1996	Lost seat
	Graeme Campbell (1939–2025)	Australia First Reform	1 July 1996 – 5 July 1996	Lost seat
	Graeme Campbell (1939–2025)	Australia First	June 1996 – 3 October 1998	Lost seat
	Barry Haase (1945–)	Liberal	3 October 1998 – 21 August 2010	Transferred to the Division of Durack after Kalgoorlie was abolished in 2010

== See also ==
- Electoral results for the Division of Kalgoorlie
