= 1958 Australian House of Representatives election =

This is a list of electoral division results for the Australian 1958 federal election.

== Overall ==
This section is an excerpt from 1958 Australian federal election § House of Representatives

House of Reps (IRV) — 1958–61—Turnout 95.48% (CV) — Informal 2.87%
| Party | Votes | % | Swing | Seats | Change |
|---|---|---|---|---|---|
| Liberal–Country coalition | 2,298,512 | 46.55 | –1.12 | 77 | +2 |
| Liberal | 1,859,180 | 37.23 | −2.53 | 58 | +1 |
| Country | 465,320 | 9.32 | +1.41 | 19 | +1 |
| Labor | 2,137,890 | 42.81 | −1.84 | 47 (Note: Including Northern Territory and Australian Capital Territory) | −2 |
| Democratic Labor | 389,688 | 7.80 | +2.63 | 0 | 0 |
| Queensland Labor | 80,035 | 1.60 | +1.60 | 0 | 0 |
| Communist | 26,337 | 0.53 | –0.63 | 0 | 0 |
| Nationalist | 3,577 | 0.07 | +0.07 | 0 | 0 |
| Independent | 31,466 | 0.63 | –0.74 | 0 | 0 |
| Total | 4,993,493 | | | 122 | |
Two-party-preferred (estimated)
| Liberal–Country coalition | Win | 54.10 | −0.10 | 77 | +2 |
| Labor | | 45.90 | +0.10 | 45 | −2 |

Popular vote
| Labor | 42.81% |
| Liberal | 37.23% |
| DLP/QLP | 9.41% |
| Country | 9.32% |
| Other | 1.23% |

Two-party-preferred vote
| Coalition | 54.10% |
| Labor | 45.90% |

Parliament seats
| Coalition | 63.11% |
| Labor | 36.89% |

== New South Wales ==
1958 Australian federal election (New South Wales)
| ← 1955 | 22 November 1958 | 1961 → |

All 46 NSW seats in the House of Representatives 23 seats needed for a majority
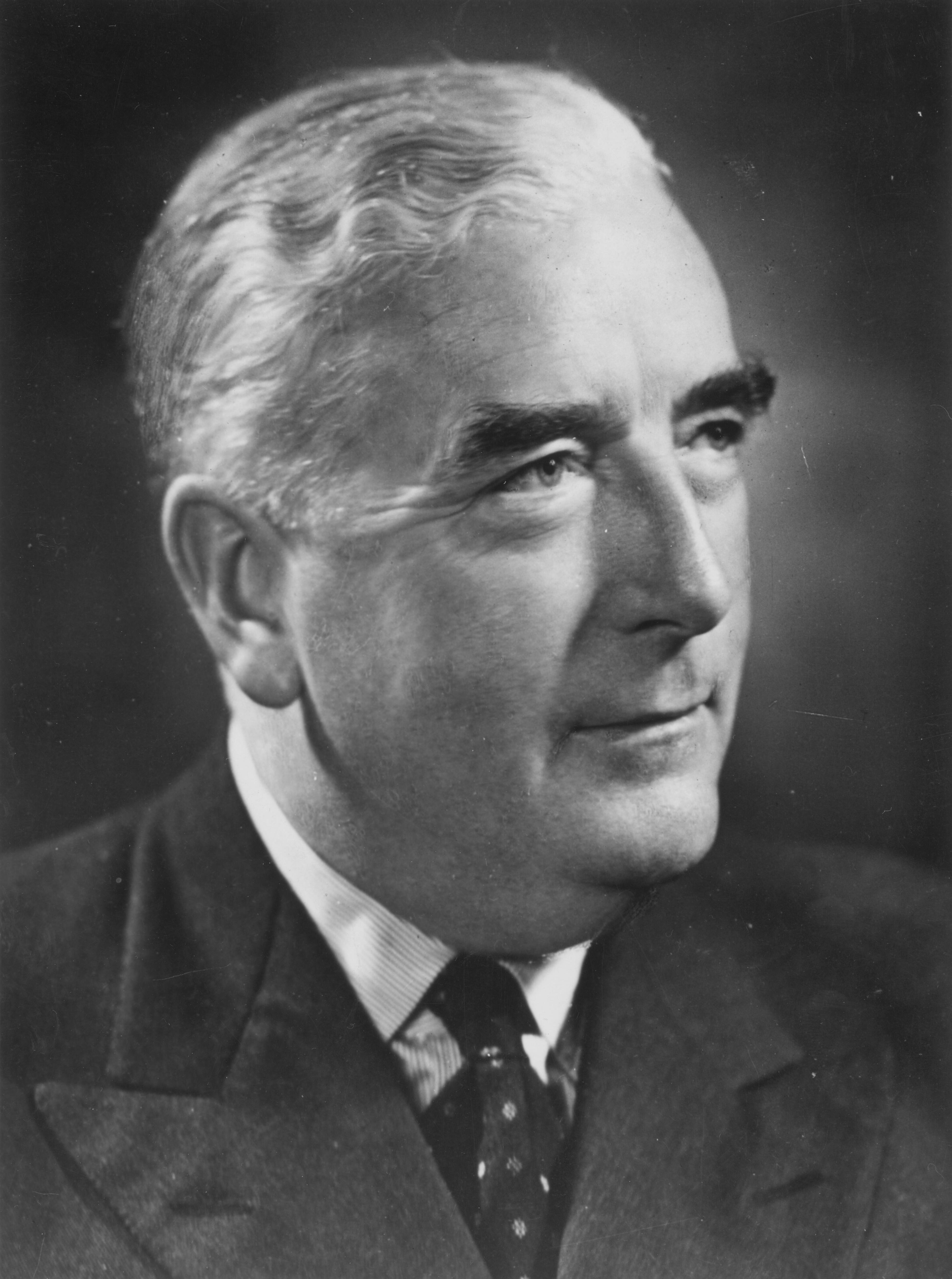

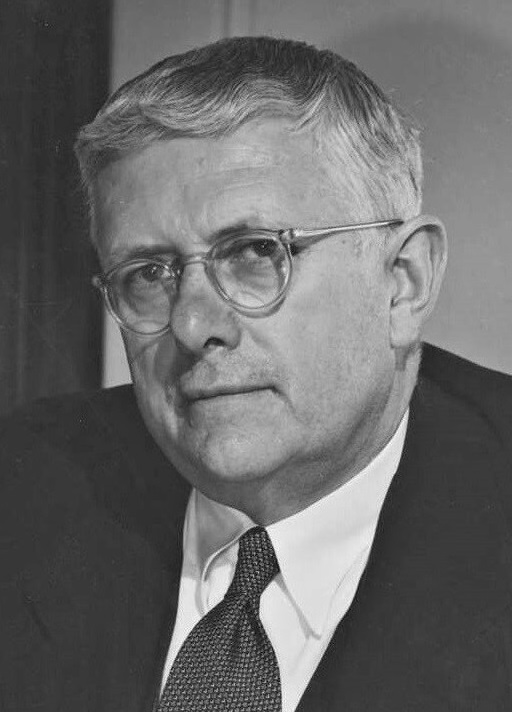
| | First party | Second party |
|---|---|---|
| Leader | Robert Menzies | H. V. Evatt |
| Party | Coalition | Labor |
| Seats before | 25 | 21 |
| Seats won | 24 | 22 |
| Seat change | ▼1 | ▲1 |
| Popular vote | 868,801 | 900,483 |
| Percentage | 45.5% | 47.1% |
| Swing | ▼1.8pp | ▼2.5pp |
| TPP | 50.2% | 49.8% |
| TPP swing | ▼0.3pp | ▲0.3pp |

=== Banks ===
This section is an excerpt from Electoral results for the Division of Banks § 1958

1958 Australian federal election: Banks
| Party | Candidate | Votes | % | ±% |
|---|---|---|---|---|
| Labor | Eric Costa | 28,338 | 58.2 | +2.2 |
| Liberal | Edgar Booth | 16,322 | 33.5 | −2.5 |
| Democratic Labor | John Lloyd | 2,407 | 4.9 | +4.9 |
| Communist | Pat Clancy | 1,634 | 3.4 | −4.6 |
| Total formal votes | | 48,701 | 96.4 | |
| Informal votes | | 1,805 | 3.6 | |
| Turnout | | 50,506 | 96.1 | |
Two-party-preferred result
| Labor | Eric Costa | | 63.4 | −1.2 |
| Liberal | Edgar Booth | | 36.6 | +1.2 |
| Labor hold | | Swing | −1.2 | |

=== Barton ===
This section is an excerpt from Electoral results for the Division of Barton § 1958

1958 Australian federal election: Barton
| Party | Candidate | Votes | % | ±% |
|---|---|---|---|---|
| Labor | Len Reynolds | 21,213 | 49.3 | +0.1 |
| Liberal | Bill Arthur | 20,345 | 47.3 | +0.4 |
| Democratic Labor | Reginald Lawson | 1,454 | 3.4 | +3.4 |
| Total formal votes | | 43,012 | 97.6 | |
| Informal votes | | 1,066 | 2.4 | |
| Turnout | | 44,078 | 96.4 | |
Two-party-preferred result
| Labor | Len Reynolds | 21,638 | 50.3 | +0.0 |
| Liberal | Bill Arthur | 21,374 | 49.7 | +0.0 |
| Labor hold | | Swing | +0.0 | |

=== Bennelong ===
This section is an excerpt from Electoral results for the Division of Bennelong § 1958

1958 Australian federal election: Bennelong
| Party | Candidate | Votes | % | ±% |
|---|---|---|---|---|
| Liberal | John Cramer | 25,518 | 54.7 | −6.0 |
| Labor | Harold Coates | 18,941 | 40.6 | +1.3 |
| Democratic Labor | Roderick Gray | 1,702 | 3.6 | +3.6 |
| Independent | Patrick Rossiter | 522 | 1.1 | +1.1 |
| Total formal votes | | 46,683 | 97.1 | |
| Informal votes | | 1,404 | 2.9 | |
| Turnout | | 48,087 | 96.0 | |
Two-party-preferred result
| Liberal | John Cramer | | 58.2 | −2.5 |
| Labor | Harold Coates | | 41.8 | +2.5 |
| Liberal hold | | Swing | −2.5 | |

=== Blaxland ===
This section is an excerpt from Electoral results for the Division of Blaxland § 1958

1958 Australian federal election: Blaxland
| Party | Candidate | Votes | % | ±% |
|---|---|---|---|---|
| Labor | Jim Harrison | 27,548 | 63.7 | +1.2 |
| Liberal | Winston Pickering | 11,908 | 27.5 | −10.0 |
| Democratic Labor | Carlyle Dalgleish | 3,784 | 8.8 | +8.8 |
| Total formal votes | | 43,240 | 96.5 | |
| Informal votes | | 1,554 | 3.5 | |
| Turnout | | 44,794 | 95.7 | |
Two-party-preferred result
| Labor | Jim Harrison | | 66.3 | +3.8 |
| Liberal | Winston Pickering | | 33.7 | −3.8 |
| Labor hold | | Swing | +3.8 | |

=== Bradfield ===
This section is an excerpt from Electoral results for the Division of Bradfield § 1958

1958 Australian federal election: Bradfield
| Party | Candidate | Votes | % | ±% |
|---|---|---|---|---|
| Liberal | Harry Turner | 34,363 | 75.7 | −24.3 |
| Labor | Percy Staines | 7,338 | 16.2 | +16.2 |
| Democratic Labor | Dominique Droulers | 3,677 | 8.1 | +8.1 |
| Total formal votes | | 45,378 | 97.8 | |
| Informal votes | | 1,035 | 2.2 | |
| Turnout | | 46,413 | 95.6 | |
Two-party-preferred result
| Liberal | Harry Turner | | 81.4 | −18.6 |
| Labor | Percy Staines | | 18.6 | +18.6 |
| Liberal hold | | Swing | −18.6 | |

=== Calare ===
This section is an excerpt from Electoral results for the Division of Calare § 1958

1958 Australian federal election: Calare
| Party | Candidate | Votes | % | ±% |
|---|---|---|---|---|
| Liberal | John Howse | 22,557 | 58.1 | −3.1 |
| Labor | Robert Rygate | 16,296 | 41.9 | +3.1 |
| Total formal votes | | 38,853 | 98.2 | |
| Informal votes | | 722 | 1.8 | |
| Turnout | | 39,575 | 95.6 | |
| Liberal hold | | Swing | −3.1 | |

=== Cowper ===
This section is an excerpt from Electoral results for the Division of Cowper § 1958

1958 Australian federal election: Cowper
| Party | Candidate | Votes | % | ±% |
|---|---|---|---|---|
| Country | Sir Earle Page | 21,152 | 54.8 | −45.2 |
| Labor | Frank McGuren | 13,980 | 36.2 | +36.2 |
| Democratic Labor | John Kellett | 3,437 | 8.9 | +8.9 |
| Total formal votes | | 38,569 | 98.0 | |
| Informal votes | | 795 | 2.0 | |
| Turnout | | 39,364 | 96.1 | |
Two-party-preferred result
| Country | Sir Earle Page | | 61.1 | −38.9 |
| Labor | Frank McGuren | | 38.9 | +38.9 |
| Country hold | | Swing | −38.9 | |

=== Cunningham ===
This section is an excerpt from Electoral results for the Division of Cunningham § 1958

1958 Australian federal election: Cunningham
| Party | Candidate | Votes | % | ±% |
|---|---|---|---|---|
| Labor | Victor Kearney | 25,087 | 57.8 | −4.4 |
| Liberal | Jack Hough | 15,242 | 35.1 | +2.1 |
| Democratic Labor | Harold Woods | 1,716 | 4.0 | +4.0 |
| Communist | Bill McDougall | 1,336 | 3.1 | −1.7 |
| Total formal votes | | 43,381 | 95.3 | |
| Informal votes | | 2,141 | 4.7 | |
| Turnout | | 45,522 | 94.1 | |
Two-party-preferred result
| Labor | Victor Kearney | | 61.4 | −5.1 |
| Liberal | Jack Hough | | 38.6 | +5.1 |
| Labor hold | | Swing | −5.1 | |

=== Dalley ===
This section is an excerpt from Electoral results for the Division of Dalley § 1958

1958 Australian federal election: Dalley
| Party | Candidate | Votes | % | ±% |
|---|---|---|---|---|
| Labor | William O'Connor | 26,081 | 71.0 | −0.9 |
| Liberal | Elton Lewis | 10,664 | 29.0 | +6.8 |
| Total formal votes | | 36,745 | 96.3 | |
| Informal votes | | 1,430 | 3.7 | |
| Turnout | | 38,175 | 93.5 | |
| Labor hold | | Swing | −6.2 | |

=== Darling ===
This section is an excerpt from Electoral results for the Division of Darling § 1958

1958 Australian federal election: Darling
| Party | Candidate | Votes | % | ±% |
|---|---|---|---|---|
| Labor | Joe Clark | 24,815 | 70.5 | +3.0 |
| Country | Elson Whyte | 9,055 | 25.7 | −6.8 |
| Independent | Francis O'Donnell | 1,349 | 3.8 | +3.8 |
| Total formal votes | | 35,219 | 97.1 | |
| Informal votes | | 1,041 | 2.9 | |
| Turnout | | 36,260 | 93.3 | |
Two-party-preferred result
| Labor | Joe Clark | | 72.4 | +4.9 |
| Country | Elson Whyte | | 27.6 | −4.9 |
| Labor hold | | Swing | +4.9 | |

=== East Sydney ===
This section is an excerpt from Electoral results for the Division of East Sydney § 1958

1958 Australian federal election: East Sydney
| Party | Candidate | Votes | % | ±% |
|---|---|---|---|---|
| Labor | Eddie Ward | 22,377 | 63.2 | −0.4 |
| Liberal | Derek Montefiore-Castle | 8,059 | 22.8 | −5.2 |
| Communist | Eddie Maher | 2,703 | 7.6 | −0.7 |
| Democratic Labor | Mervyn Reid | 2,283 | 6.4 | +6.4 |
| Total formal votes | | 35,422 | 95.6 | |
| Informal votes | | 1,633 | 4.4 | |
| Turnout | | 37,055 | 91.3 | |
Two-party-preferred result
| Labor | Eddie Ward | | 70.4 | +0.2 |
| Liberal | Derek Montefiore-Castle | | 29.6 | −0.2 |
| Labor hold | | Swing | +0.2 | |

=== Eden-Monaro ===
This section is an excerpt from Electoral results for the Division of Eden-Monaro § 1958

1958 Australian federal election: Eden-Monaro
| Party | Candidate | Votes | % | ±% |
|---|---|---|---|---|
| Labor | Allan Fraser | 21,410 | 53.7 | +0.8 |
| Liberal | Douglas Thomson | 16,221 | 40.7 | −1.1 |
| Democratic Labor | John Donohue | 2,250 | 5.6 | +5.6 |
| Total formal votes | | 39,881 | 98.4 | |
| Informal votes | | 649 | 1.6 | |
| Turnout | | 40,530 | 95.5 | |
Two-party-preferred result
| Labor | Allan Fraser | | 55.6 | +0.5 |
| Liberal | Douglas Thomson | | 44.4 | −0.5 |
| Labor hold | | Swing | +0.5 | |

=== Evans ===
This section is an excerpt from Electoral results for the Division of Evans § 1958

1958 Australian federal election: Evans
| Party | Candidate | Votes | % | ±% |
|---|---|---|---|---|
| Liberal | Frederick Osborne | 20,488 | 52.0 | −8.9 |
| Labor | James Monaghan | 16,482 | 41.8 | +2.7 |
| Democratic Labor | Lawrence Pedemont | 2,440 | 6.2 | +6.2 |
| Total formal votes | | 39,410 | 97.1 | |
| Informal votes | | 1,170 | 2.9 | |
| Turnout | | 40,580 | 95.3 | |
Two-party-preferred result
| Liberal | Frederick Osborne | | 57.0 | −3.9 |
| Labor | James Monaghan | | 43.0 | +3.9 |
| Liberal hold | | Swing | −3.9 | |

=== Farrer ===
This section is an excerpt from Electoral results for the Division of Farrer § 1958

1958 Australian federal election: Farrer
| Party | Candidate | Votes | % | ±% |
|---|---|---|---|---|
| Liberal | David Fairbairn | 23,395 | 58.1 | −7.8 |
| Labor | Robert Garland | 12,441 | 30.9 | −3.2 |
| Democratic Labor | William Brennan | 4,412 | 11.0 | +11.0 |
| Total formal votes | | 40,248 | 97.9 | |
| Informal votes | | 850 | 2.1 | |
| Turnout | | 41,098 | 95.9 | |
Two-party-preferred result
| Liberal | David Fairbairn | | 67.1 | +1.2 |
| Labor | Robert Garland | | 32.9 | −1.2 |
| Liberal hold | | Swing | +1.2 | |

=== Grayndler ===
This section is an excerpt from Electoral results for the Division of Grayndler § 1958

1958 Australian federal election: Grayndler
| Party | Candidate | Votes | % | ±% |
|---|---|---|---|---|
| Labor | Fred Daly | 22,908 | 61.9 | +1.8 |
| Liberal | Evan MacLaurin | 9,872 | 26.7 | −3.8 |
| Communist | Hal Alexander | 2,713 | 7.3 | −0.7 |
| Democratic Labor | Charles McCafferty | 1,220 | 3.3 | +3.3 |
| Independent | William McCristal | 286 | 0.8 | −0.7 |
| Total formal votes | | 36,999 | 95.5 | |
| Informal votes | | 1,754 | 4.5 | |
| Turnout | | 38,753 | 94.7 | |
Two-party-preferred result
| Labor | Fred Daly | | 69.6 | +2.3 |
| Liberal | Evan MacLaurin | | 30.4 | −2.3 |
| Labor hold | | Swing | +2.3 | |

=== Gwydir ===
This section is an excerpt from Electoral results for the Division of Gwydir § 1958

1958 Australian federal election: Gwydir
| Party | Candidate | Votes | % | ±% |
|---|---|---|---|---|
| Country | Ian Allan | 21,304 | 55.0 | −2.9 |
| Labor | Austin Heffernan | 17,414 | 45.0 | +2.9 |
| Total formal votes | | 38,718 | 98.4 | |
| Informal votes | | 640 | 1.6 | |
| Turnout | | 39,358 | 94.9 | |
| Country hold | | Swing | −2.9 | |

=== Hughes ===
This section is an excerpt from Electoral results for the Division of Hughes § 1958

1958 Australian federal election: Hughes
| Party | Candidate | Votes | % | ±% |
|---|---|---|---|---|
| Labor | Les Johnson | 28,651 | 53.8 | +5.4 |
| Liberal | John Dwyer | 22,352 | 42.0 | −4.7 |
| Democratic Labor | Kevin O'Connor | 2,221 | 4.2 | +4.2 |
| Total formal votes | | 53,224 | 97.8 | |
| Informal votes | | 1,203 | 2.2 | |
| Turnout | | 54,427 | 96.4 | |
Two-party-preferred result
| Labor | Les Johnson | | 54.6 | +2.4 |
| Liberal | John Dwyer | | 45.4 | −2.4 |
| Labor hold | | Swing | +2.4 | |

=== Hume ===
This section is an excerpt from Electoral results for the Division of Hume § 1958

1958 Australian federal election: Hume
| Party | Candidate | Votes | % | ±% |
|---|---|---|---|---|
| Country | Charles Anderson | 19,056 | 48.6 | −3.6 |
| Labor | Arthur Fuller | 18,164 | 46.3 | −1.5 |
| Democratic Labor | Raymond Nolan | 1,974 | 5.0 | +5.0 |
| Total formal votes | | 39,194 | 98.3 | |
| Informal votes | | 679 | 1.7 | |
| Turnout | | 39,873 | 96.4 | |
Two-party-preferred result
| Country | Charles Anderson | 20,401 | 52.1 | −0.1 |
| Labor | Arthur Fuller | 18,793 | 47.9 | +0.1 |
| Country hold | | Swing | −0.1 | |

=== Hunter ===
This section is an excerpt from Electoral results for the Division of Hunter § 1958

1958 Australian federal election: Hunter
| Party | Candidate | Votes | % | ±% |
|---|---|---|---|---|
| Labor | Herbert Evatt | 31,740 | 74.4 | +3.6 |
| Liberal | John Marsden | 6,036 | 14.1 | −7.2 |
| Democratic Labor | William Burke | 4,884 | 11.4 | +11.4 |
| Total formal votes | | 42,660 | 97.8 | |
| Informal votes | | 972 | 2.2 | |
| Turnout | | 43,632 | 96.2 | |
Two-party-preferred result
| Labor | Herbert Evatt | | 77.5 | −0.3 |
| Liberal | John Marsden | | 32.5 | +0.3 |
| Labor hold | | Swing | −0.3 | |

=== Kingsford Smith ===
This section is an excerpt from Electoral results for the Division of Kingsford Smith § 1958

1958 Australian federal election: Kingsford-Smith
| Party | Candidate | Votes | % | ±% |
|---|---|---|---|---|
| Labor | Dan Curtin | 23,713 | 56.2 | +3.5 |
| Liberal | George Dan | 15,488 | 36.7 | −6.1 |
| Democratic Labor | Bernard McOrrie | 3,001 | 7.1 | +7.1 |
| Total formal votes | | 42,202 | 97.4 | |
| Informal votes | | 1,138 | 2.6 | |
| Turnout | | 43,340 | 95.5 | |
Two-party-preferred result
| Labor | Dan Curtin | | 57.6 | +2.6 |
| Liberal | George Dan | | 42.4 | −2.6 |
| Labor hold | | Swing | +2.6 | |

=== Lang ===
This section is an excerpt from Electoral results for the Division of Lang § 1958

1958 Australian federal election: Lang
| Party | Candidate | Votes | % | ±% |
|---|---|---|---|---|
| Labor | Frank Stewart | 26,915 | 60.6 | +0.3 |
| Liberal | Hugh Bygott | 15,539 | 35.0 | −4.7 |
| Democratic Labor | Kevin Davis | 1,944 | 4.4 | +4.4 |
| Total formal votes | | 44,398 | 97.1 | |
| Informal votes | | 1,321 | 2.9 | |
| Turnout | | 45,719 | 96.0 | |
Two-party-preferred result
| Labor | Frank Stewart | | 61.5 | +1.2 |
| Liberal | Hugh Bygott | | 38.5 | −1.2 |
| Labor hold | | Swing | +1.2 | |

=== Lawson ===
This section is an excerpt from Electoral results for the Division of Lawson § 1958

1958 Australian federal election: Lawson
| Party | Candidate | Votes | % | ±% |
|---|---|---|---|---|
| Country | Laurie Failes | 19,237 | 49.7 | −7.0 |
| Labor | Jack Tully | 16,367 | 42.3 | −1.0 |
| Democratic Labor | Edward English | 3,080 | 8.0 | +8.0 |
| Total formal votes | | 38,684 | 98.2 | |
| Informal votes | | 712 | 1.8 | |
| Turnout | | 39,396 | 95.5 | |
Two-party-preferred result
| Country | Laurie Failes | 21,675 | 56.0 | −0.7 |
| Labor | Jack Tully | 17,009 | 44.0 | +0.7 |
| Country hold | | Swing | −0.7 | |

=== Lowe ===
This section is an excerpt from Electoral results for the Division of Lowe § 1958

1958 Australian federal election: Lowe
| Party | Candidate | Votes | % | ±% |
|---|---|---|---|---|
| Liberal | William McMahon | 22,239 | 55.6 | −4.7 |
| Labor | Joseph Sloss | 14,086 | 35.2 | −4.5 |
| Democratic Labor | Mollie Dolan | 3,669 | 9.2 | +9.2 |
| Total formal votes | | 39,994 | 97.3 | |
| Informal votes | | 1,101 | 2.7 | |
| Turnout | | 41,095 | 94.9 | |
Two-party-preferred result
| Liberal | William McMahon | | 63.2 | +2.9 |
| Labor | Joseph Sloss | | 36.8 | −2.9 |
| Liberal hold | | Swing | +2.9 | |

=== Lyne ===
This section is an excerpt from Electoral results for the Division of Lyne § 1958

1958 Australian federal election: Lyne
| Party | Candidate | Votes | % | ±% |
|---|---|---|---|---|
| Country | Philip Lucock | 21,548 | 53.4 | −6.4 |
| Labor | John Allan | 13,028 | 32.3 | −3.9 |
| Independent | Murray Hooke | 3,921 | 9.7 | +9.7 |
| Democratic Labor | William Gleeson | 1,322 | 3.3 | +3.3 |
| Independent | Joe Cordner | 561 | 1.4 | −2.6 |
| Total formal votes | | 40,380 | 97.6 | |
| Informal votes | | 986 | 2.4 | |
| Turnout | | 41,366 | 96.4 | |
Two-party-preferred result
| Country | Philip Lucock | | 61.5 | −0.3 |
| Labor | John Allan | | 38.5 | +0.3 |
| Country hold | | Swing | −0.3 | |

=== Macarthur ===
This section is an excerpt from Electoral results for the Division of Macarthur § 1958

1958 Australian federal election: Macarthur
| Party | Candidate | Votes | % | ±% |
|---|---|---|---|---|
| Liberal | Jeff Bate | 26,002 | 59.3 | +1.3 |
| Labor | Eric Ryan | 17,861 | 40.7 | −1.3 |
| Total formal votes | | 43,863 | 97.9 | |
| Informal votes | | 936 | 2.1 | |
| Turnout | | 44,799 | 94.5 | |
| Liberal hold | | Swing | +1.3 | |

=== Mackellar ===
This section is an excerpt from Electoral results for the Division of Mackellar § 1958

1958 Australian federal election: Mackellar
| Party | Candidate | Votes | % | ±% |
|---|---|---|---|---|
| Liberal | Bill Wentworth | 27,258 | 59.0 | −3.1 |
| Labor | Mabel Elliott | 14,002 | 30.3 | −0.1 |
| Communist | Hugh Begg | 2,734 | 5.9 | −1.6 |
| Democratic Labor | Ann Macken | 2,170 | 4.7 | +4.7 |
| Total formal votes | | 46,164 | 96.7 | |
| Informal votes | | 1,589 | 3.3 | |
| Turnout | | 47,753 | 93.3 | |
Two-party-preferred result
| Liberal | Bill Wentworth | | 63.3 | +0.4 |
| Labor | Mabel Elliott | | 36.7 | −0.4 |
| Liberal hold | | Swing | +0.4 | |

=== Macquarie ===
This section is an excerpt from Electoral results for the Division of Macquarie § 1958

1958 Australian federal election: Macquarie
| Party | Candidate | Votes | % | ±% |
|---|---|---|---|---|
| Labor | Tony Luchetti | 23,646 | 58.1 | +2.2 |
| Liberal | Norman Leven | 14,476 | 35.5 | −5.9 |
| Democratic Labor | Hugh Dougherty | 2,611 | 6.4 | +6.4 |
| Total formal votes | | 40,733 | 97.8 | |
| Informal votes | | 933 | 2.2 | |
| Turnout | | 41,666 | 95.4 | |
Two-party-preferred result
| Labor | Tony Luchetti | | 59.2 | +0.9 |
| Liberal | Norman Leven | | 40.8 | −0.9 |
| Labor hold | | Swing | +0.9 | |

=== Mitchell ===
This section is an excerpt from Electoral results for the Division of Mitchell § 1958

1958 Australian federal election: Mitchell
| Party | Candidate | Votes | % | ±% |
|---|---|---|---|---|
| Liberal | Roy Wheeler | 26,536 | 54.6 | −5.1 |
| Labor | Reginald Byrne | 20,062 | 41.2 | +0.9 |
| Democratic Labor | Francis Moffitt | 2,039 | 4.2 | +4.2 |
| Total formal votes | | 48,637 | 97.4 | |
| Informal votes | | 1,317 | 2.6 | |
| Turnout | | 49,954 | 94.3 | |
Two-party-preferred result
| Liberal | Roy Wheeler | | 58.0 | −1.7 |
| Labor | Reginald Byrne | | 42.0 | +1.7 |
| Liberal hold | | Swing | −1.7 | |

=== New England ===
This section is an excerpt from Electoral results for the Division of New England § 1958

1958 Australian federal election: New England
| Party | Candidate | Votes | % | ±% |
|---|---|---|---|---|
| Country | David Drummond | 23,425 | 59.6 | −0.8 |
| Labor | Donald White | 12,473 | 31.8 | −7.8 |
| Democratic Labor | John Burless | 3,385 | 8.6 | +8.6 |
| Total formal votes | | 39,283 | 97.8 | |
| Informal votes | | 885 | 2.2 | |
| Turnout | | 40,168 | 95.5 | |
Two-party-preferred result
| Country | David Drummond | | 66.7 | +6.3 |
| Labor | Donald White | | 33.3 | −6.3 |
| Country hold | | Swing | +6.3 | |

=== Newcastle ===
This section is an excerpt from Electoral results for the Division of Newcastle1958

1958 Australian federal election: Newcastle
| Party | Candidate | Votes | % | ±% |
|---|---|---|---|---|
| Labor | Charles Jones | 23,235 | 59.9 | +0.7 |
| Liberal | Alwyn Watkins | 11,486 | 29.6 | −7.7 |
| Democratic Labor | Jack Collins | 3,226 | 8.3 | +8.3 |
| Independent | Mary Pepperall | 676 | 1.7 | +1.7 |
| Independent | Sidney Monroe | 151 | 0.4 | −0.9 |
| Total formal votes | | 38,774 | 97.0 | |
| Informal votes | | 1,198 | 3.0 | |
| Turnout | | 39,972 | 96.1 | |
Two-party-preferred result
| Labor | Charles Jones | | 63.4 | +1.6 |
| Liberal | Alwyn Watkins | | 36.6 | −1.6 |
| Labor hold | | Swing | +1.6 | |

=== North Sydney ===
This section is an excerpt from Electoral results for the Division of North Sydney § 1958

1958 Australian federal election: North Sydney
| Party | Candidate | Votes | % | ±% |
|---|---|---|---|---|
| Liberal | William Jack | 22,273 | 57.1 | −5.2 |
| Labor | Jack Stephens | 13,344 | 34.2 | −3.5 |
| Democratic Labor | Gregory McGirr | 2,968 | 7.6 | +7.6 |
| Independent | Edward McGregor | 400 | 1.0 | +1.0 |
| Total formal votes | | 38,985 | 96.7 | |
| Informal votes | | 1,336 | 3.3 | |
| Turnout | | 40,321 | 94.9 | |
Two-party-preferred result
| Liberal | William Jack | | 63.7 | +1.4 |
| Labor | Jack Stephens | | 36.3 | −1.4 |
| Liberal hold | | Swing | +1.4 | |

=== Parkes ===
This section is an excerpt from Electoral results for the Division of Parkes (1901–1969) § 1958

1958 Australian federal election: Parkes
| Party | Candidate | Votes | % | ±% |
|---|---|---|---|---|
| Labor | Les Haylen | 20,096 | 49.9 | −0.8 |
| Liberal | George Chambers | 18,178 | 45.1 | −4.2 |
| Democratic Labor | Maurice Colreavy | 2,024 | 5.0 | +5.0 |
| Total formal votes | | 40,298 | 97.2 | |
| Informal votes | | 1,167 | 2.8 | |
| Turnout | | 41,465 | 95.5 | |
Two-party-preferred result
| Labor | Les Haylen | 20,562 | 51.0 | +0.3 |
| Liberal | George Chambers | 19,736 | 49.0 | −0.3 |
| Labor hold | | Swing | +0.3 | |

=== Parramatta ===
This section is an excerpt from Electoral results for the Division of Parramatta § 1958

1958 Australian federal election: Parramatta
| Party | Candidate | Votes | % | ±% |
|---|---|---|---|---|
| Liberal | Sir Garfield Barwick | 27,344 | 56.8 | −5.5 |
| Labor | Ray Jones | 19,141 | 39.7 | +2.0 |
| Democratic Labor | William Kildea | 1,693 | 3.5 | +3.5 |
| Total formal votes | | 48,178 | 97.7 | |
| Informal votes | | 1,156 | 2.3 | |
| Turnout | | 49,334 | 96.4 | |
Two-party-preferred result
| Liberal | Sir Garfield Barwick | | 59.6 | −2.7 |
| Labor | Ray Jones | | 40.4 | +2.7 |
| Liberal hold | | Swing | −2.7 | |

=== Paterson ===
This section is an excerpt from Electoral results for the Division of Paterson § 1958

1958 Australian federal election: Paterson
| Party | Candidate | Votes | % | ±% |
|---|---|---|---|---|
| Liberal | Allen Fairhall | 21,064 | 53.6 | −6.6 |
| Labor | Alan Lloyd | 14,248 | 36.3 | −3.5 |
| Democratic Labor | Douglas Drinkwater | 3,969 | 10.1 | +10.1 |
| Total formal votes | | 39,281 | 97.7 | |
| Informal votes | | 933 | 2.3 | |
| Turnout | | 40,214 | 96.7 | |
Two-party-preferred result
| Liberal | Allen Fairhall | | 61.9 | +1.7 |
| Labor | Alan Lloyd | | 38.1 | −1.7 |
| Liberal hold | | Swing | +1.7 | |

=== Phillip ===
This section is an excerpt from Electoral results for the Division of Phillip § 1958

1958 Australian federal election: Phillip
| Party | Candidate | Votes | % | ±% |
|---|---|---|---|---|
| Liberal | William Aston | 18,836 | 47.1 | −4.0 |
| Labor | Joe Fitzgerald | 18,467 | 46.2 | −2.7 |
| Democratic Labor | Peter Daly | 2,206 | 5.5 | +5.5 |
| Independent | Sidney Doubleday | 463 | 1.2 | +1.2 |
| Total formal votes | | 39,972 | 96.6 | |
| Informal votes | | 1,421 | 3.4 | |
| Turnout | | 41,393 | 94.7 | |
Two-party-preferred result
| Liberal | William Aston | 20,735 | 51.9 | +0.8 |
| Labor | Joe Fitzgerald | 19,237 | 48.1 | −0.8 |
| Liberal hold | | Swing | +0.8 | |

=== Reid ===
This section is an excerpt from Electoral results for the Division of Reid § 1958

1958 Australian federal election: Reid
| Party | Candidate | Votes | % | ±% |
|---|---|---|---|---|
| Labor | Tom Uren | 23,422 | 49.1 | −13.8 |
| Liberal | Derek Bryden | 12,597 | 26.4 | +2.8 |
| Independent | Charles Morgan | 10,201 | 21.4 | +21.4 |
| Democratic Labor | Andrew Murphy | 1,439 | 3.0 | +3.0 |
| Total formal votes | | 47,659 | 96.8 | |
| Informal votes | | 1,681 | 3.4 | |
| Turnout | | 49,340 | 95.9 | |
Two-party-preferred result
| Labor | Tom Uren | 30,539 | 64.1 | −8.8 |
| Liberal | Derek Bryden | 17,120 | 35.9 | +8.8 |
| Labor hold | | Swing | −8.8 | |

=== Richmond ===
This section is an excerpt from Electoral results for the Division of Richmond § 1958

1958 Australian federal election: Richmond
| Party | Candidate | Votes | % | ±% |
|---|---|---|---|---|
| Country | Doug Anthony | 27,516 | 69.8 | −30.2 |
| Labor | William Smith | 10,589 | 26.9 | +26.9 |
| Independent | Timothy Donnelly | 1,292 | 3.3 | +3.3 |
| Total formal votes | | 39,397 | 98.5 | |
| Informal votes | | 600 | 1.5 | |
| Turnout | | 39,997 | 96.3 | |
Two-party-preferred result
| Country | Doug Anthony | | 71.5 | −28.5 |
| Labor | William Smith | | 28.5 | +28.5 |
| Country hold | | Swing | −28.5 | |

=== Riverina ===
This section is an excerpt from Electoral results for the Division of Riverina § 1958

1958 Australian federal election: Riverina
| Party | Candidate | Votes | % | ±% |
|---|---|---|---|---|
| Country | Hugh Roberton | 20,894 | 53.8 | −5.5 |
| Labor | Jack Ward | 15,640 | 40.3 | −0.4 |
| Democratic Labor | Peter Rolfe | 2,320 | 6.0 | +6.0 |
| Total formal votes | | 38,854 | 97.9 | |
| Informal votes | | 828 | 2.1 | |
| Turnout | | 39,682 | 94.1 | |
Two-party-preferred result
| Country | Hugh Roberton | | 58.6 | −0.7 |
| Labor | Jack Ward | | 41.4 | +0.7 |
| Country hold | | Swing | −0.7 | |

=== Robertson ===
This section is an excerpt from Electoral results for the Division of Robertson § 1958

1958 Australian federal election: Robertson
| Party | Candidate | Votes | % | ±% |
|---|---|---|---|---|
| Liberal | Roger Dean | 23,201 | 53.9 | −3.8 |
| Labor | Joseph McCaig | 18,058 | 42.0 | −0.3 |
| Democratic Labor | Neil Mackerras | 1,771 | 4.1 | +4.1 |
| Total formal votes | | 43,030 | 97.5 | |
| Informal votes | | 1,101 | 2.5 | |
| Turnout | | 44,131 | 94.1 | |
Two-party-preferred result
| Liberal | Roger Dean | | 57.2 | −0.5 |
| Labor | Joseph McCaig | | 42.8 | +0.5 |
| Liberal hold | | Swing | −0.5 | |

=== Shortland ===
This section is an excerpt from Electoral results for the Division of Shortland § 1958

1958 Australian federal election: Shortland
| Party | Candidate | Votes | % | ±% |
|---|---|---|---|---|
| Labor | Charles Griffiths | 27,366 | 61.0 | −2.2 |
| Liberal | Hilary Fallins | 11,861 | 26.4 | −10.4 |
| Democratic Labor | Robert Burke | 4,096 | 9.1 | +9.1 |
| Communist | William Quinn | 1,561 | 3.5 | +3.5 |
| Total formal votes | | 44,884 | 96.9 | |
| Informal votes | | 1,449 | 3.1 | |
| Turnout | | 46,333 | 96.5 | |
Two-party-preferred result
| Labor | Charles Griffiths | | 65.7 | +2.5 |
| Liberal | Hilary Fallins | | 34.3 | −2.5 |
| Labor hold | | Swing | +2.5 | |

=== St George ===
This section is an excerpt from Electoral results for the Division of St George § 1958

1958 Australian federal election: St George
| Party | Candidate | Votes | % | ±% |
|---|---|---|---|---|
| Labor | Lionel Clay | 20,532 | 49.1 | +1.5 |
| Liberal | Bill Graham | 19,675 | 47.1 | −5.3 |
| Democratic Labor | Mary Nappa | 1,590 | 3.8 | +3.8 |
| Total formal votes | | 41,797 | 97.3 | |
| Informal votes | | 1,151 | 2.7 | |
| Turnout | | 42,948 | 96.7 | |
Two-party-preferred result
| Labor | Lionel Clay | 20,928 | 50.1 | +2.5 |
| Liberal | Bill Graham | 20,869 | 49.9 | −2.5 |
| Labor gain from Liberal | | Swing | +2.5 | |

=== Warringah ===
This section is an excerpt from Electoral results for the Division of Warringah § 1958

1958 Australian federal election: Warringah
| Party | Candidate | Votes | % | ±% |
|---|---|---|---|---|
| Liberal | Francis Bland | 30,534 | 73.1 | −26.9 |
| Labor | Norman Braviner | 8,069 | 19.3 | +19.3 |
| Democratic Labor | Peter Keogh | 3,163 | 7.6 | +7.6 |
| Total formal votes | | 41,766 | 97.2 | |
| Informal votes | | 1,225 | 2.8 | |
| Turnout | | 42,991 | 94.6 | |
Two-party-preferred result
| Liberal | Francis Bland | | 79.2 | −20.8 |
| Labor | Norman Braviner | | 20.8 | +20.8 |
| Liberal hold | | Swing | −20.8 | |

=== Watson ===
This section is an excerpt from Electoral results for the Division of Watson (1934–1969) § 1958

1958 Australian federal election: Watson
| Party | Candidate | Votes | % | ±% |
|---|---|---|---|---|
| Labor | Jim Cope | 27,232 | 71.0 | −3.4 |
| Liberal | John Bampton | 9,628 | 25.1 | +4.6 |
| Democratic Labor | Kenneth Collins | 1,503 | 3.9 | +3.9 |
| Total formal votes | | 38,363 | 96.5 | |
| Informal votes | | 1,397 | 3.5 | |
| Turnout | | 39,760 | 95.5 | |
Two-party-preferred result
| Labor | Jim Cope | | 71.8 | −7.1 |
| Liberal | John Bampton | | 28.2 | +7.1 |
| Labor hold | | Swing | −7.1 | |

=== Wentworth ===
This section is an excerpt from Electoral results for the Division of Wentworth § 1958

1958 Australian federal election: Wentworth
| Party | Candidate | Votes | % | ±% |
|---|---|---|---|---|
| Liberal | Les Bury | 26,823 | 69.2 | −2.8 |
| Labor | Sydney Davis | 8,816 | 23.2 | +23.2 |
| Democratic Labor | John Gillian | 2,892 | 7.6 | +7.6 |
| Total formal votes | | 38,031 | 97.1 | |
| Informal votes | | 1,156 | 2.9 | |
| Turnout | | 39,187 | 93.8 | |
Two-party-preferred result
| Liberal | Les Bury | | 75.3 | +3.3 |
| Labor | Sydney Davis | | 24.7 | +24.7 |
| Liberal hold | | Swing | +3.3 | |

=== Werriwa ===
This section is an excerpt from Electoral results for the Division of Werriwa § 1958

1958 Australian federal election: Werriwa
| Party | Candidate | Votes | % | ±% |
|---|---|---|---|---|
| Labor | Gough Whitlam | 26,241 | 56.4 | +0.0 |
| Liberal | John Shannon | 15,199 | 32.7 | −10.9 |
| Democratic Labor | Les Hale | 5,100 | 11.0 | +2.0 |
| Total formal votes | | 46,540 | 96.1 | |
| Informal votes | | 1,889 | 3.9 | |
| Turnout | | 48,429 | 95.0 | |
Two-party-preferred result
| Labor | Gough Whitlam | | 58.4 | +2.0 |
| Liberal | John Shannon | | 41.6 | −2.0 |
| Labor hold | | Swing | +2.0 | |

=== West Sydney ===
This section is an excerpt from Electoral results for the Division of West Sydney § 1958

1958 Australian federal election: West Sydney
| Party | Candidate | Votes | % | ±% |
|---|---|---|---|---|
| Labor | Dan Minogue | 22,610 | 65.7 | −8.0 |
| Liberal | Adrian Cook | 6,535 | 19.0 | −1.2 |
| Democratic Labor | Allan Charlesworth | 3,763 | 10.9 | +10.9 |
| Communist | Lance Sharkey | 1,489 | 4.3 | +4.3 |
| Total formal votes | | 34,397 | 94.8 | |
| Informal votes | | 1,892 | 5.2 | |
| Turnout | | 36,289 | 90.8 | |
Two-party-preferred result
| Labor | Dan Minogue | | 71.6 | −7.7 |
| Liberal | Adrian Cook | | 28.4 | +7.7 |
| Labor hold | | Swing | −7.7 | |

== Victoria ==
1958 Australian federal election (Victoria)
| ← 1955 | 22 November 1958 | 1961 → |

All 33 Victorian seats in the House of Representatives 17 seats needed for a majority
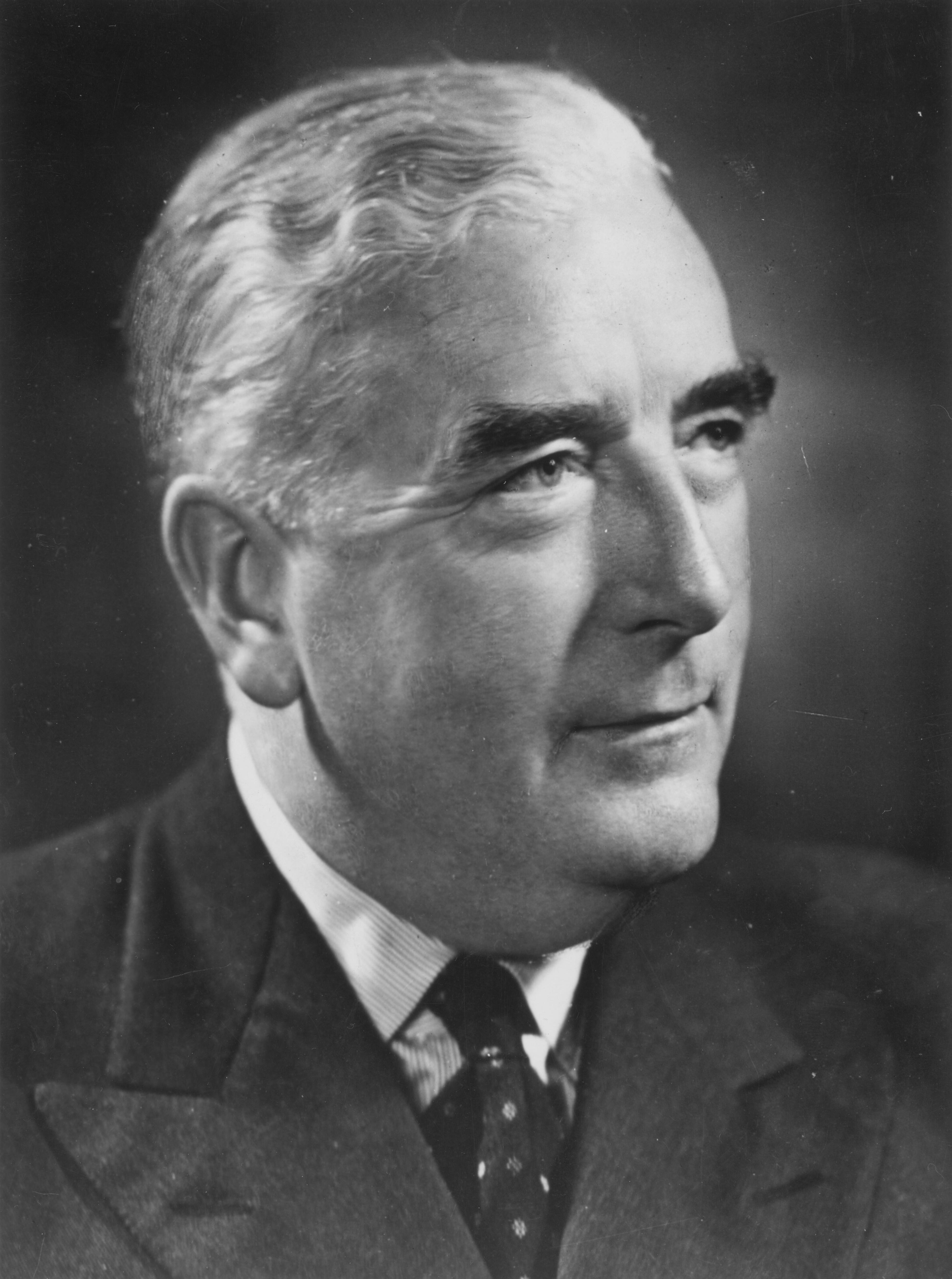

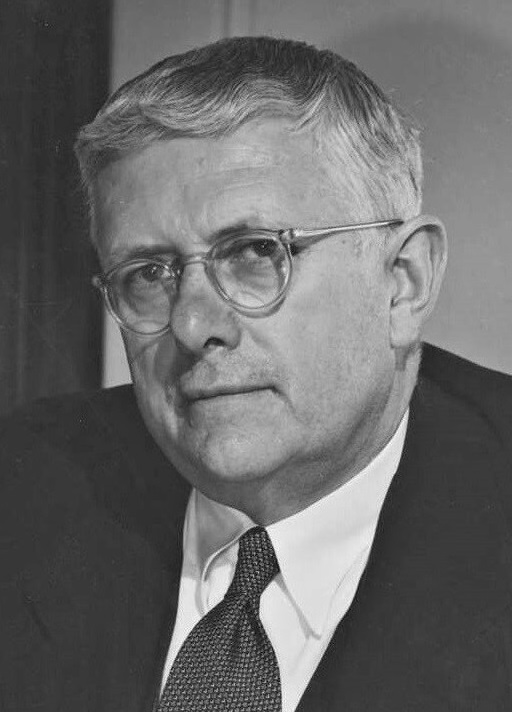
| | First party | Second party |
|---|---|---|
| Leader | Robert Menzies | H. V. Evatt |
| Party | Coalition | Labor |
| Seats before | 23 | 10 |
| Seats won | 23 | 10 |
| Seat change | Steady | Steady |
| Popular vote | 635,139 | 555,129 |
| Percentage | 45.2% | 39.5% |
| Swing | ▼1.7pp | ▲2.4pp |
| TPP | 57.7% | 42.3% |
| TPP swing | ▼1.5pp | ▲1.5pp |

=== Balaclava ===
This section is an excerpt from Electoral results for the Division of Balaclava § 1958

1958 Australian federal election: Balaclava
| Party | Candidate | Votes | % | ±% |
|---|---|---|---|---|
| Liberal | Percy Joske | 24,722 | 61.1 | −3.0 |
| Labor | Norman Rothfield | 10,232 | 25.3 | +1.3 |
| Democratic Labor | Rex Keane | 4,852 | 12.0 | +0.2 |
| Independent | Grace Stratton | 626 | 1.5 | +1.5 |
| Total formal votes | | 40,432 | 97.7 | |
| Informal votes | | 965 | 2.3 | |
| Turnout | | 41,397 | 95.8 | |
Two-party-preferred result
| Liberal | Percy Joske | | 72.7 | −0.8 |
| Labor | Norman Rothfield | | 27.3 | +0.8 |
| Liberal hold | | Swing | −0.8 | |

=== Ballaarat ===
This section is an excerpt from Electoral results for the Division of Ballarat § 1958

1958 Australian federal election: Ballaarat
| Party | Candidate | Votes | % | ±% |
|---|---|---|---|---|
| Labor | Donald Drummond | 17,903 | 42.8 | +4.7 |
| Liberal | Dudley Erwin | 16,683 | 39.9 | +1.6 |
| Democratic Labor | Bob Joshua | 7,204 | 17.2 | −6.5 |
| Total formal votes | | 41,760 | 98.6 | |
| Informal votes | | 610 | 1.4 | |
| Turnout | | 42,400 | 97.1 | |
Two-party-preferred result
| Liberal | Dudley Erwin | 23,167 | 55.4 | −2.5 |
| Labor | Donald Drummond | 18,623 | 44.6 | +2.5 |
| Liberal hold | | Swing | −2.5 | |

=== Batman ===
This section is an excerpt from Electoral results for the Division of Batman § 1958

1958 Australian federal election: Batman
| Party | Candidate | Votes | % | ±% |
|---|---|---|---|---|
| Labor | Alan Bird | 21,902 | 51.5 | +1.8 |
| Liberal | Fred Capp | 14,443 | 33.9 | −1.1 |
| Democratic Labor | Tom Walsh | 6,205 | 14.6 | −0.7 |
| Total formal votes | | 42,550 | 97.9 | |
| Informal votes | | 918 | 2.1 | |
| Turnout | | 43,468 | 95.8 | |
Two-party-preferred result
| Labor | Alan Bird | | 53.0 | +1.3 |
| Liberal | Fred Capp | | 47.0 | −1.3 |
| Labor hold | | Swing | +1.3 | |

=== Bendigo ===
This section is an excerpt from Electoral results for the Division of Bendigo § 1958

1958 Australian federal election: Bendigo
| Party | Candidate | Votes | % | ±% |
|---|---|---|---|---|
| Labor | Percy Clarey | 20,840 | 48.5 | +2.3 |
| Liberal | Henry Snell | 16,471 | 38.4 | −2.0 |
| Democratic Labor | Bill Drechsler | 5,619 | 13.1 | −0.3 |
| Total formal votes | | 42,930 | 98.7 | |
| Informal votes | | 584 | 1.3 | |
| Turnout | | 43,514 | 96.8 | |
Two-party-preferred result
| Labor | Percy Clarey | 21,598 | 50.3 | −0.9 |
| Liberal | Henry Snell | 21,332 | 49.7 | +0.9 |
| Labor hold | | Swing | −0.9 | |

=== Bruce ===
This section is an excerpt from Electoral results for the Division of Bruce § 1958

1958 Australian federal election: Bruce
| Party | Candidate | Votes | % | ±% |
|---|---|---|---|---|
| Liberal | Billy Snedden | 28,251 | 46.1 | −1.6 |
| Labor | Keith Ewert | 24,681 | 40.3 | −1.1 |
| Democratic Labor | Henri de Sachau | 8,326 | 13.6 | +2.6 |
| Total formal votes | | 61,258 | 97.6 | |
| Informal votes | | 1,475 | 2.4 | |
| Turnout | | 62,733 | 96.4 | |
Two-party-preferred result
| Liberal | Billy Snedden | 33,398 | 54.5 | −1.2 |
| Labor | Keith Ewert | 27,860 | 45.5 | +1.2 |
| Liberal hold | | Swing | −1.2 | |

=== Chisholm ===
This section is an excerpt from Electoral results for the Division of Chisholm § 1958

1958 Australian federal election: Chisholm
| Party | Candidate | Votes | % | ±% |
|---|---|---|---|---|
| Liberal | Sir Wilfrid Kent Hughes | 24,026 | 60.0 | −5.1 |
| Labor | Leo Bartley | 11,494 | 28.7 | +3.7 |
| Democratic Labor | John Hoare | 4,547 | 11.3 | +1.4 |
| Total formal votes | | 40,067 | 98.1 | |
| Informal votes | | 766 | 1.9 | |
| Turnout | | 40,833 | 95.7 | |
Two-party-preferred result
| Liberal | Sir Wilfrid Kent Hughes | | 70.2 | −4.0 |
| Labor | Leo Bartley | | 29.8 | +4.0 |
| Liberal hold | | Swing | −4.0 | |

=== Corangamite ===
This section is an excerpt from Electoral results for the Division of Corangamite § 1958

1958 Australian federal election: Corangamite
| Party | Candidate | Votes | % | ±% |
|---|---|---|---|---|
| Liberal | Dan Mackinnon | 22,724 | 53.8 | −7.0 |
| Labor | Edwin Morris | 11,299 | 26.7 | +0.6 |
| Democratic Labor | Patrick Bourke | 7,526 | 17.8 | +4.8 |
| Independent | Elsie Brushfield | 728 | 1.7 | +1.7 |
| Total formal votes | | 42,277 | 98.1 | |
| Informal votes | | 824 | 1.9 | |
| Turnout | | 43,101 | 96.6 | |
Two-party-preferred result
| Liberal | Dan Mackinnon | | 70.7 | −0.5 |
| Labor | Edwin Morris | | 29.3 | +0.5 |
| Liberal hold | | Swing | −0.5 | |

=== Corio ===
This section is an excerpt from Electoral results for the Division of Corio § 1958

1958 Australian federal election: Corio
| Party | Candidate | Votes | % | ±% |
|---|---|---|---|---|
| Liberal | Hubert Opperman | 20,019 | 47.2 | −2.1 |
| Labor | Bernard O'Leary | 16,508 | 38.9 | −2.1 |
| Democratic Labor | James Mahoney | 5,920 | 13.9 | +4.2 |
| Total formal votes | | 42,447 | 98.3 | |
| Informal votes | | 717 | 1.7 | |
| Turnout | | 43,164 | 95.8 | |
Two-party-preferred result
| Liberal | Hubert Opperman | 24,065 | 56.7 | −0.5 |
| Labor | Bernard O'Leary | 18,382 | 43.3 | +0.5 |
| Liberal hold | | Swing | −0.5 | |

=== Darebin ===
This section is an excerpt from Electoral results for the Division of Darebin § 1958

1958 Australian federal election: Darebin
| Party | Candidate | Votes | % | ±% |
|---|---|---|---|---|
| Labor | Frank Courtnay | 25,213 | 51.1 | +3.2 |
| Liberal | Gordon Duncan | 12,400 | 25.1 | −1.9 |
| Democratic Labor | Tom Andrews | 11,710 | 23.7 | −1.4 |
| Total formal votes | | 49,323 | 97.6 | |
| Informal votes | | 1,189 | 2.4 | |
| Turnout | | 50,512 | 96.5 | |
Two-party-preferred result
| Labor | Frank Courtnay | | 54.4 | −4.4 |
| Liberal | Gordon Duncan | | 45.6 | +4.4 |
| Labor hold | | Swing | −4.4 | |

=== Deakin ===
This section is an excerpt from Electoral results for the Division of Deakin § 1958

1958 Australian federal election: Deakin
| Party | Candidate | Votes | % | ±% |
|---|---|---|---|---|
| Liberal | Frank Davis | 24,709 | 50.4 | −2.9 |
| Labor | Norm Griffiths | 17,411 | 35.5 | +2.4 |
| Democratic Labor | Terence Collins | 6,877 | 14.0 | +0.4 |
| Total formal votes | | 48,997 | 98.0 | |
| Informal votes | | 987 | 2.0 | |
| Turnout | | 49,984 | 95.6 | |
Two-party-preferred result
| Liberal | Frank Davis | | 63.1 | −1.3 |
| Labor | Norm Griffiths | | 36.9 | +1.3 |
| Liberal hold | | Swing | −1.3 | |

=== Fawkner ===
This section is an excerpt from Electoral results for the Division of Fawkner § 1958

1958 Australian federal election: Fawkner
| Party | Candidate | Votes | % | ±% |
|---|---|---|---|---|
| Liberal | Peter Howson | 17,312 | 48.3 | +2.1 |
| Labor | George Smart | 11,797 | 32.9 | +6.4 |
| Democratic Labor | Bill Bourke | 6,709 | 18.7 | −8.6 |
| Total formal votes | | 35,818 | 97.3 | |
| Informal votes | | 996 | 2.7 | |
| Turnout | | 36,814 | 94.4 | |
Two-party-preferred result
| Liberal | Peter Howson | 23,198 | 64.8 | +12.5 |
| Labor | George Smart | 12,620 | 35.2 | +35.2 |
| Liberal hold | | Swing | +12.5 | |

=== Flinders ===
This section is an excerpt from Electoral results for the Division of Flinders § 1958

1958 Australian federal election: Flinders
| Party | Candidate | Votes | % | ±% |
|---|---|---|---|---|
| Liberal | Robert Lindsay | 23,283 | 50.6 | −2.5 |
| Labor | Nola Barber | 18,011 | 39.2 | +7.1 |
| Democratic Labor | Thomas Flanagan | 4,698 | 10.2 | −4.6 |
| Total formal votes | | 45,992 | 97.9 | |
| Informal votes | | 1,009 | 2.1 | |
| Turnout | | 47,001 | 95.2 | |
Two-party-preferred result
| Liberal | Robert Lindsay | | 59.8 | −4.3 |
| Labor | Nola Barber | | 40.2 | +4.3 |
| Liberal hold | | Swing | −4.3 | |

=== Gellibrand ===
This section is an excerpt from Electoral results for the Division of Gellibrand § 1958

1958 Australian federal election: Gellibrand
| Party | Candidate | Votes | % | ±% |
|---|---|---|---|---|
| Labor | Hector McIvor | 25,054 | 63.0 | +1.6 |
| Liberal | Barry Maddern | 7,211 | 18.1 | −4.0 |
| Democratic Labor | James Eudey | 6,760 | 17.0 | +2.5 |
| Communist | Frank Johnson | 758 | 1.9 | −0.1 |
| Total formal votes | | 39,783 | 96.4 | |
| Informal votes | | 1,465 | 3.6 | |
| Turnout | | 41,248 | 96.3 | |
Two-party-preferred result
| Labor | Hector McIvor | | 66.5 | +0.4 |
| Liberal | Barry Maddern | | 33.5 | −0.4 |
| Labor hold | | Swing | +0.4 | |

=== Gippsland ===
This section is an excerpt from Electoral results for the Division of Gippsland § 1958

1958 Australian federal election: Gippsland
| Party | Candidate | Votes | % | ±% |
|---|---|---|---|---|
| Country | George Bowden | 23,869 | 58.3 | −4.3 |
| Labor | Clement Little | 11,258 | 27.5 | +2.8 |
| Democratic Labor | John Hansen | 5,785 | 14.1 | +1.4 |
| Total formal votes | | 40,912 | 98.1 | |
| Informal votes | | 810 | 1.9 | |
| Turnout | | 41,722 | 95.7 | |
Two-party-preferred result
| Country | George Bowden | | 71.0 | −2.0 |
| Labor | Clement Little | | 29.0 | +2.0 |
| Country hold | | Swing | −2.0 | |

=== Henty ===
This section is an excerpt from Electoral results for the Division of Henty § 1958

1958 Australian federal election: Henty
| Party | Candidate | Votes | % | ±% |
|---|---|---|---|---|
| Liberal | Max Fox | 22,506 | 50.5 | −3.7 |
| Labor | Tom Gilhooley | 16,276 | 36.6 | +2.8 |
| Democratic Labor | Henry Moore | 5,742 | 12.9 | +0.9 |
| Total formal votes | | 44,524 | 97.8 | |
| Informal votes | | 987 | 2.2 | |
| Turnout | | 45,511 | 96.2 | |
Two-party-preferred result
| Liberal | Max Fox | | 62.1 | −1.7 |
| Labor | Tom Gilhooley | | 37.9 | +1.7 |
| Liberal hold | | Swing | −1.7 | |

=== Higgins ===
This section is an excerpt from Electoral results for the Division of Higgins § 1958

1958 Australian federal election: Higgins
| Party | Candidate | Votes | % | ±% |
|---|---|---|---|---|
| Liberal | Harold Holt | 24,486 | 63.2 | −1.2 |
| Labor | Alfred Shiff | 9,564 | 24.7 | +2.6 |
| Democratic Labor | Celia Laird | 4,701 | 12.1 | −1.4 |
| Total formal votes | | 38,751 | 97.9 | |
| Informal votes | | 839 | 2.1 | |
| Turnout | | 39,590 | 93.5 | |
Two-party-preferred result
| Liberal | Harold Holt | | 74.1 | −1.3 |
| Labor | Alfred Shiff | | 25.9 | +1.3 |
| Liberal hold | | Swing | −1.3 | |

=== Higinbotham ===
This section is an excerpt from Electoral results for the Division of Higinbotham § 1958

1958 Australian federal election: Higinbotham
| Party | Candidate | Votes | % | ±% |
|---|---|---|---|---|
| Liberal | Frank Timson | 24,770 | 49.5 | −1.3 |
| Labor | Edwin Lamb | 19,600 | 39.2 | +0.0 |
| Democratic Labor | Desmond Ward | 5,665 | 11.3 | +1.3 |
| Total formal votes | | 50,035 | 98.0 | |
| Informal votes | | 1,003 | 2.0 | |
| Turnout | | 51,038 | 96.2 | |
Two-party-preferred result
| Liberal | Frank Timson | 29,920 | 59.8 | +1.0 |
| Labor | Edwin Lamb | 20,115 | 40.2 | −1.0 |
| Liberal hold | | Swing | +1.0 | |

=== Indi ===
This section is an excerpt from Electoral results for the Division of Indi § 1958

1958 Australian federal election: Indi
| Party | Candidate | Votes | % | ±% |
|---|---|---|---|---|
| Country | Mac Holten | 12,420 | 30.9 | +30.9 |
| Liberal | William Bostock | 12,322 | 30.6 | −29.0 |
| Labor | John McLaren | 9,758 | 24.2 | −0.6 |
| Democratic Labor | Henry Richards | 5,416 | 13.5 | −2.1 |
| Independent | James Ellis | 324 | 0.8 | +0.8 |
| Total formal votes | | 40,240 | 97.3 | |
| Informal votes | | 1,128 | 2.7 | |
| Turnout | | 41,368 | 95.5 | |
Two-party-preferred result
| Country | Mac Holten | 22,736 | 56.5 | +56.5 |
| Liberal | William Bostock | 17,505 | 43.5 | −28.6 |
| Country gain from Liberal | | Swing | +28.6 | |

=== Isaacs ===
This section is an excerpt from Electoral results for the Division of Isaacs (1949–1969) § 1958

1958 Australian federal election: Isaacs
| Party | Candidate | Votes | % | ±% |
|---|---|---|---|---|
| Liberal | William Haworth | 16,534 | 45.4 | −9.1 |
| Labor | Barry Jones | 12,933 | 35.5 | +2.2 |
| Democratic Labor | John Hughes | 4,316 | 11.9 | −0.3 |
| Independent | Elias Cowan | 2,624 | 7.2 | +7.2 |
| Total formal votes | | 36,407 | 95.8 | |
| Informal votes | | 1,581 | 4.2 | |
| Turnout | | 37,988 | 93.4 | |
Two-party-preferred result
| Liberal | William Haworth | | 61.4 | −2.9 |
| Labor | Barry Jones | | 38.6 | +2.9 |
| Liberal hold | | Swing | −2.9 | |

=== Kooyong ===
This section is an excerpt from Electoral results for the Division of Kooyong § 1958

1958 Australian federal election: Kooyong
| Party | Candidate | Votes | % | ±% |
|---|---|---|---|---|
| Liberal | Robert Menzies | 28,285 | 63.4 | −3.2 |
| Labor | Dolph Eddy | 9,921 | 22.2 | +0.2 |
| Democratic Labor | John Buchanan | 5,962 | 13.4 | +3.1 |
| Communist | Gerry O'Day | 476 | 1.1 | −0.1 |
| Total formal votes | | 44,644 | 98.1 | |
| Informal votes | | 882 | 1.9 | |
| Turnout | | 45,526 | 95.5 | |
Two-party-preferred result
| Liberal | Robert Menzies | | 74.7 | −0.2 |
| Labor | Dolph Eddy | | 25.3 | +0.2 |
| Liberal hold | | Swing | −0.2 | |

=== La Trobe ===
This section is an excerpt from Electoral results for the Division of La Trobe § 1958

1958 Australian federal election: La Trobe
| Party | Candidate | Votes | % | ±% |
|---|---|---|---|---|
| Liberal | Richard Casey | 28,570 | 53.7 | −3.9 |
| Labor | Sam Goldbloom | 19,623 | 36.9 | +3.5 |
| Democratic Labor | Terence Kirley | 4,963 | 9.3 | +0.3 |
| Total formal votes | | 53,156 | 98.1 | |
| Informal votes | | 1,031 | 1.9 | |
| Turnout | | 54,187 | 95.9 | |
Two-party-preferred result
| Liberal | Richard Casey | | 62.1 | −2.7 |
| Labor | Sam Goldbloom | | 37.9 | +2.7 |
| Liberal hold | | Swing | −2.7 | |

=== Lalor ===
This section is an excerpt from Electoral results for the Division of Lalor § 1958

1958 Australian federal election: Lalor
| Party | Candidate | Votes | % | ±% |
|---|---|---|---|---|
| Labor | Reg Pollard | 30,872 | 51.2 | +2.1 |
| Liberal | Peter Kemp | 17,904 | 29.7 | −7.5 |
| Democratic Labor | John Donnellon | 11,475 | 19.0 | +5.4 |
| Total formal votes | | 60,251 | 97.4 | |
| Informal votes | | 1,628 | 2.6 | |
| Turnout | | 61,879 | 94.8 | |
Two-party-preferred result
| Labor | Reg Pollard | | 53.0 | +2.1 |
| Liberal | Peter Kemp | | 47.0 | −2.1 |
| Labor hold | | Swing | +2.1 | |

=== Mallee ===
This section is an excerpt from Electoral results for the Division of Mallee § 1958

1958 Australian federal election: Mallee
| Party | Candidate | Votes | % | ±% |
|---|---|---|---|---|
| Country | Winton Turnbull | 24,356 | 63.9 | −1.7 |
| Labor | George Xeros | 8,313 | 21.8 | +0.4 |
| Democratic Labor | John Cotter | 5,470 | 14.3 | +1.3 |
| Total formal votes | | 38,139 | 97.9 | |
| Informal votes | | 818 | 2.1 | |
| Turnout | | 38,957 | 96.5 | |
Two-party-preferred result
| Country | Winton Turnbull | | 76.9 | +1.7 |
| Labor | George Xeros | | 23.1 | −1.7 |
| Country hold | | Swing | +1.7 | |

=== Maribyrnong ===
This section is an excerpt from Electoral results for the Division of Maribyrnong § 1958

1958 Australian federal election: Maribyrnong
| Party | Candidate | Votes | % | ±% |
|---|---|---|---|---|
| Labor | Doug Elliot | 19,917 | 47.3 | +0.2 |
| Liberal | Philip Stokes | 15,548 | 36.9 | −0.5 |
| Democratic Labor | Paul Gunn | 6,646 | 15.8 | +0.4 |
| Total formal votes | | 42,111 | 98.2 | |
| Informal votes | | 763 | 1.8 | |
| Turnout | | 42,874 | 97.0 | |
Two-party-preferred result
| Liberal | Philip Stokes | 21,402 | 50.8 | +0.7 |
| Labor | Doug Elliot | 20,709 | 49.2 | −0.7 |
| Liberal hold | | Swing | +0.7 | |

=== McMillan ===
This section is an excerpt from Electoral results for the Division of McMillan § 1958

1958 Australian federal election: McMillan
| Party | Candidate | Votes | % | ±% |
|---|---|---|---|---|
| Labor | George Brown | 15,821 | 39.3 | +4.7 |
| Liberal | Alex Buchanan | 12,113 | 30.1 | −21.9 |
| Country | Francis Hawtin | 7,514 | 18.7 | +18.7 |
| Democratic Labor | Kevin Scanlon | 4,123 | 10.2 | −3.2 |
| Communist | Wattie Doig | 450 | 1.1 | +1.1 |
| Independent | Decima Mayne | 210 | 0.5 | +0.5 |
| Total formal votes | | 40,231 | 95.2 | |
| Informal votes | | 2,040 | 4.8 | |
| Turnout | | 42,271 | 95.4 | |
Two-party-preferred result
| Liberal | Alex Buchanan | 23,031 | 57.2 | −5.5 |
| Labor | George Brown | 17,200 | 42.8 | +5.5 |
| Liberal hold | | Swing | −5.5 | |

=== Melbourne ===
This section is an excerpt from Electoral results for the Division of Melbourne § 1958

1958 Australian federal election: Melbourne
| Party | Candidate | Votes | % | ±% |
|---|---|---|---|---|
| Labor | Arthur Calwell | 20,335 | 59.6 | +2.2 |
| Liberal | James Moloney | 7,766 | 22.8 | +1.6 |
| Democratic Labor | John Ryan | 6,023 | 17.7 | −3.7 |
| Total formal votes | | 34,124 | 96.1 | |
| Informal votes | | 1,370 | 3.9 | |
| Turnout | | 35,494 | 93.6 | |
Two-party-preferred result
| Labor | Arthur Calwell | | 61.4 | +1.9 |
| Liberal | James Moloney | | 38.6 | +38.6 |
| Labor hold | | Swing | +1.9 | |

=== Melbourne Ports ===
This section is an excerpt from Electoral results for the Division of Melbourne Ports § 1958

1958 Australian federal election: Melbourne Ports
| Party | Candidate | Votes | % | ±% |
|---|---|---|---|---|
| Labor | Frank Crean | 22,968 | 63.6 | +11.6 |
| Liberal | Norman Loader | 7,381 | 20.4 | +0.7 |
| Democratic Labor | John Fitzgerald | 4,969 | 13.8 | −11.4 |
| Communist | Roger Wilson | 813 | 2.3 | −0.8 |
| Total formal votes | | 36,131 | 96.4 | |
| Informal votes | | 1,362 | 3.6 | |
| Turnout | | 37,493 | 95.0 | |
Two-party-preferred result
| Labor | Frank Crean | | 67.2 | +10.4 |
| Liberal | Norman Loader | | 32.8 | +32.8 |
| Labor hold | | Swing | +10.4 | |

=== Murray ===
This section is an excerpt from Electoral results for the Division of Murray § 1958

1958 Australian federal election: Murray
| Party | Candidate | Votes | % | ±% |
|---|---|---|---|---|
| Country | John McEwen | 25,710 | 61.8 | +1.1 |
| Labor | Neil Frankland | 10,560 | 25.4 | −0.4 |
| Democratic Labor | Brian Lacey | 5,303 | 12.8 | −0.7 |
| Total formal votes | | 41,573 | 97.5 | |
| Informal votes | | 1,066 | 2.5 | |
| Turnout | | 42,639 | 96.4 | |
Two-party-preferred result
| Country | John McEwen | | 73.3 | +1.8 |
| Labor | Neil Frankland | | 26.7 | −1.8 |
| Country hold | | Swing | +1.8 | |

=== Scullin ===
This section is an excerpt from Electoral results for the Division of Scullin (1955–69) § 1958

1958 Australian federal election: Scullin
| Party | Candidate | Votes | % | ±% |
|---|---|---|---|---|
| Labor | Ted Peters | 18,619 | 56.0 | +6.3 |
| Democratic Labor | Thomas Brennan | 8,160 | 24.5 | −6.1 |
| Liberal | Bill Burns | 6,488 | 19.5 | −0.1 |
| Total formal votes | | 33,267 | 95.4 | |
| Informal votes | | 1,593 | 4.6 | |
| Turnout | | 34,860 | 94.2 | |
Two-party-preferred result
| Labor | Ted Peters | | 58.0 | +6.3 |
| Democratic Labor | Thomas Brennan | | 42.0 | −6.3 |
| Labor hold | | Swing | +6.3 | |

=== Wannon ===
This section is an excerpt from Electoral results for the Division of Wannon § 1958

1958 Australian federal election: Wannon
| Party | Candidate | Votes | % | ±% |
|---|---|---|---|---|
| Liberal | Malcolm Fraser | 20,550 | 48.2 | −0.7 |
| Labor | Jack Stanford | 15,501 | 36.3 | +0.7 |
| Democratic Labor | Terence Callander | 6,614 | 15.5 | +0.0 |
| Total formal votes | | 42,665 | 98.8 | |
| Informal votes | | 534 | 1.2 | |
| Turnout | | 43,199 | 97.1 | |
Two-party-preferred result
| Liberal | Malcolm Fraser | 25,591 | 62.3 | +3.0 |
| Labor | Jack Stanford | 16,074 | 37.7 | −3.0 |
| Liberal hold | | Swing | +3.0 | |

=== Wills ===
This section is an excerpt from Electoral results for the Division of Wills § 1958

1958 Australian federal election: Wills
| Party | Candidate | Votes | % | ±% |
|---|---|---|---|---|
| Labor | Gordon Bryant | 21,308 | 53.7 | +6.4 |
| Liberal | Alfred Wall | 10,498 | 26.5 | −1.5 |
| Democratic Labor | Bill Bryson | 7,881 | 19.9 | −4.8 |
| Total formal votes | | 39,687 | 97.1 | |
| Informal votes | | 1,170 | 2.9 | |
| Turnout | | 40,857 | 96.2 | |
Two-party-preferred result
| Labor | Gordon Bryant | | 55.7 | +1.3 |
| Liberal | Alfred Wall | | 44.3 | −1.3 |
| Labor hold | | Swing | +1.3 | |

=== Wimmera ===
This section is an excerpt from Electoral results for the Division of Wimmera § 1958

1958 Australian federal election: Wimmera
| Party | Candidate | Votes | % | ±% |
|---|---|---|---|---|
| Liberal | William Lawrence | 14,924 | 38.2 | −20.4 |
| Labor | Thomas Windsor | 10,760 | 27.6 | −2.5 |
| Country | Robert King | 9,866 | 25.3 | +25.3 |
| Democratic Labor | James McCaffrey | 3,480 | 8.9 | −2.4 |
| Total formal votes | | 39,030 | 98.3 | |
| Informal votes | | 658 | 1.7 | |
| Turnout | | 39,688 | 96.9 | |
Two-party-preferred result
| Country | Robert King | 21,821 | 55.9 | +55.9 |
| Liberal | William Lawrence | 17,209 | 44.1 | −22.7 |
| Country gain from Liberal | | Swing | +22.7 | |

=== Yarra ===
This section is an excerpt from Electoral results for the Division of Yarra § 1958

1958 Australian federal election: Yarra
| Party | Candidate | Votes | % | ±% |
|---|---|---|---|---|
| Labor | Jim Cairns | 19,218 | 53.6 | +6.1 |
| Liberal | Cecil Lanyon | 8,505 | 23.7 | +0.4 |
| Democratic Labor | Stan Keon | 7,600 | 21.2 | −5.9 |
| Communist | Ken Miller | 524 | 1.5 | −0.5 |
| Total formal votes | | 35,847 | 96.4 | |
| Informal votes | | 1,346 | 3.6 | |
| Turnout | | 37,193 | 94.6 | |
Two-party-preferred result
| Labor | Jim Cairns | | 57.1 | +6.1 |
| Liberal | Cecil Lanyon | | 42.9 | +42.9 |
| Labor hold | | Swing | +6.1 | |

== Queensland ==
1958 Australian federal election (Queensland)
| ← 1955 | 22 November 1958 | 1961 → |

All 18 Queensland seats in the House of Representatives 9 seats needed for a majority
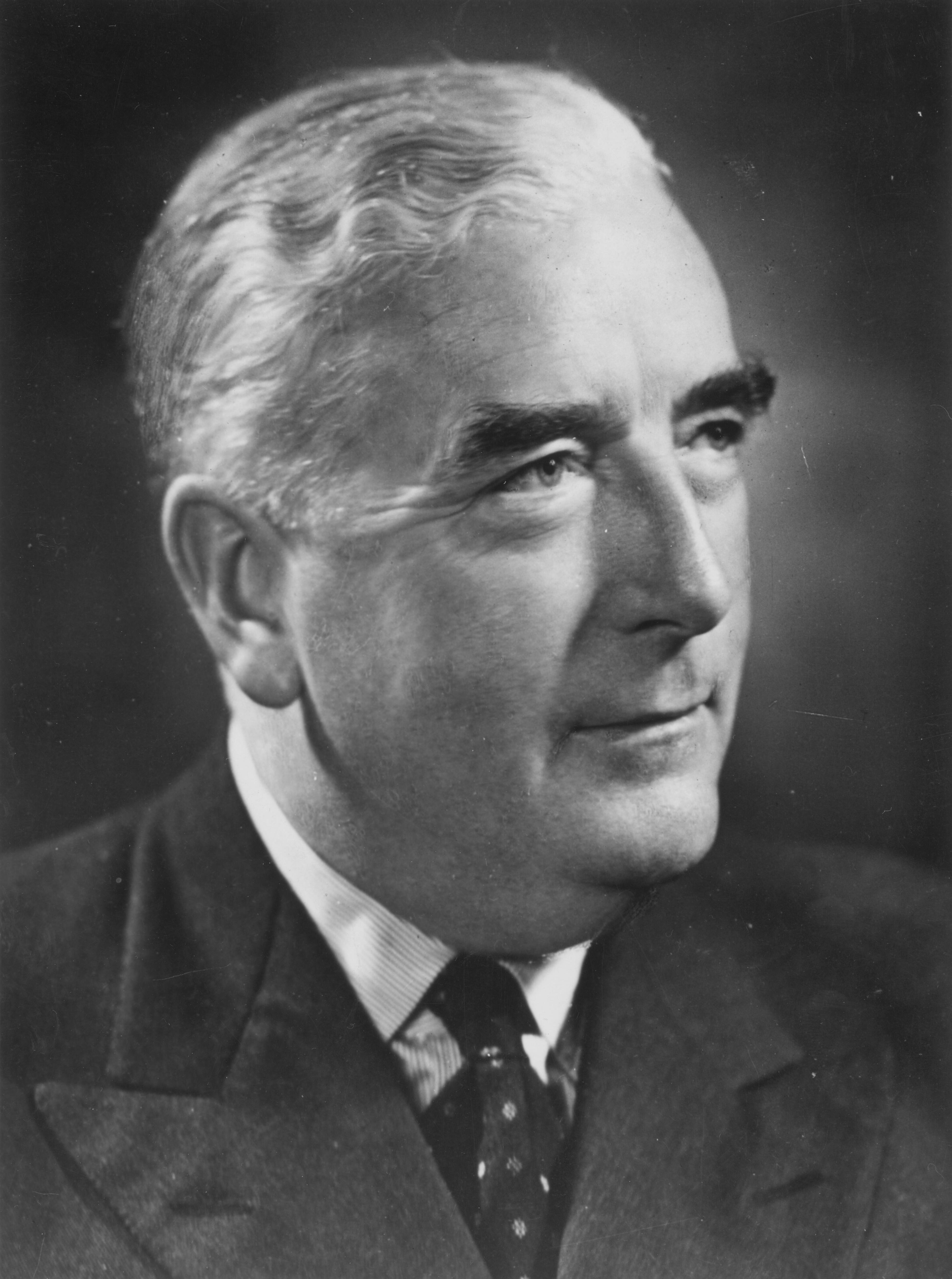

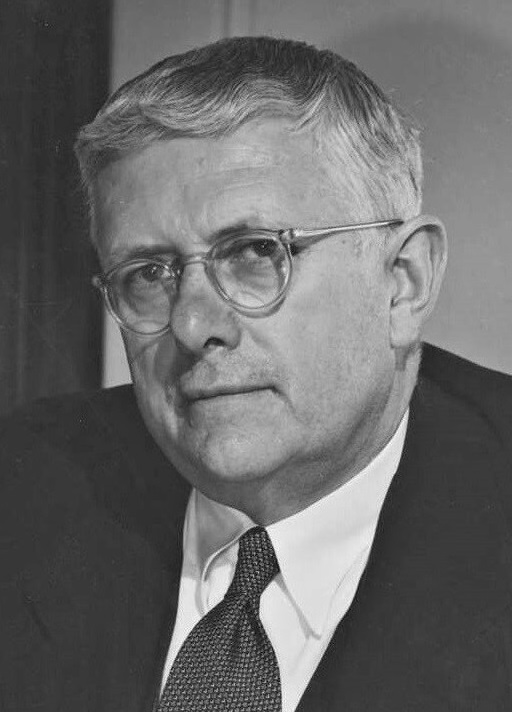
| | First party | Second party |
|---|---|---|
| Leader | Robert Menzies | H. V. Evatt |
| Party | Coalition | Labor |
| Seats before | 13 | 5 |
| Seats won | 15 | 3 |
| Seat change | ▲2 | ▼2 |
| Popular vote | 364,542 | 270,676 |
| Percentage | 50.4% | 37.5% |
| Swing | ▼2.3pp | ▼4.6pp |
| TPP | 58.6% | 41.4% |
| TPP swing | ▲2.5pp | ▼2.5pp |

=== Bowman ===
This section is an excerpt from Electoral results for the Division of Bowman § 1958

1958 Australian federal election: Bowman
| Party | Candidate | Votes | % | ±% |
|---|---|---|---|---|
| Liberal | Malcolm McColm | 20,770 | 48.9 | −5.8 |
| Labor | Hector Chalmers | 16,398 | 38.6 | −6.7 |
| Queensland Labor | Terence Burns | 5,002 | 11.8 | +11.8 |
| Australian Nationalist | Noel Condie | 331 | 0.8 | +0.8 |
| Total formal votes | | 42,501 | 97.2 | |
| Informal votes | | 1,244 | 2.8 | |
| Turnout | | 43,745 | 95.5 | |
Two-party-preferred result
| Liberal | Malcolm McColm | 23,841 | 56.1 | −1.4 |
| Labor | Hector Chalmers | 18,660 | 43.9 | +1.4 |
| Liberal hold | | Swing | −1.4 | |

=== Brisbane ===
This section is an excerpt from Electoral results for the Division of Brisbane § 1958

1958 Australian federal election: Brisbane
| Party | Candidate | Votes | % | ±% |
|---|---|---|---|---|
| Labor | George Lawson | 17,360 | 47.3 | −5.6 |
| Liberal | Kevin Cairns | 14,235 | 38.7 | −5.3 |
| Queensland Labor | Geoffrey Maule | 4,135 | 11.3 | +11.3 |
| Communist | Jim Henderson | 643 | 1.8 | −1.3 |
| Australian Nationalist | John Morgan | 363 | 1.0 | +1.0 |
| Total formal votes | | 36,736 | 94.1 | |
| Informal votes | | 2,290 | 5.9 | |
| Turnout | | 39,026 | 94.7 | |
Two-party-preferred result
| Labor | George Lawson | 18,620 | 50.7 | −5.0 |
| Liberal | Kevin Cairns | 18,116 | 49.3 | +5.0 |
| Labor hold | | Swing | −5.0 | |

=== Capricornia ===
This section is an excerpt from Electoral results for the Division of Capricornia § 1958

1958 Australian federal election: Capricornia
| Party | Candidate | Votes | % | ±% |
|---|---|---|---|---|
| Liberal | Henry Pearce | 18,074 | 49.0 | −4.8 |
| Labor | Colin Maxwell | 14,978 | 40.6 | −2.8 |
| Queensland Labor | James Verney | 3,830 | 10.4 | +10.4 |
| Total formal votes | | 36,882 | 97.3 | |
| Informal votes | | 1,020 | 2.7 | |
| Turnout | | 37,902 | 97.2 | |
Two-party-preferred result
| Liberal | Henry Pearce | 21,284 | 57.7 | +1.7 |
| Labor | Colin Maxwell | 15,598 | 42.3 | −1.7 |
| Liberal hold | | Swing | +1.7 | |

=== Darling Downs ===
This section is an excerpt from Electoral results for the Division of Darling Downs § 1958

1958 Australian federal election: Darling Downs
| Party | Candidate | Votes | % | ±% |
|---|---|---|---|---|
| Liberal | Reginald Swartz | 22,469 | 56.5 | −43.5 |
| Labor | Jack McCafferty | 13,623 | 34.3 | +34.3 |
| Queensland Labor | Margaret Walsh | 3,680 | 9.3 | +9.3 |
| Total formal votes | | 39,772 | 98.2 | |
| Informal votes | | 737 | 1.8 | |
| Turnout | | 40,509 | 95.9 | |
Two-party-preferred result
| Liberal | Reginald Swartz | | 63.9 | −36.1 |
| Labor | Jack McCafferty | | 36.1 | +36.1 |
| Liberal hold | | Swing | −36.1 | |

=== Dawson ===
This section is an excerpt from Electoral results for the Division of Dawson § 1958

1958 Australian federal election: Dawson
| Party | Candidate | Votes | % | ±% |
|---|---|---|---|---|
| Country | Charles Davidson | 21,424 | 60.8 | −0.4 |
| Labor | Selwyn Ferguson | 10,243 | 29.1 | −9.7 |
| Queensland Labor | Waller O'Grady | 3,569 | 10.1 | +10.1 |
| Total formal votes | | 35,236 | 97.2 | |
| Informal votes | | 999 | 2.8 | |
| Turnout | | 36,235 | 94.9 | |
Two-party-preferred result
| Country | Charles Davidson | | 68.9 | +7.7 |
| Labor | Selwyn Ferguson | | 31.2 | −7.7 |
| Country hold | | Swing | +7.7 | |

=== Fisher ===
This section is an excerpt from Electoral results for the Division of Fisher § 1958

1958 Australian federal election: Fisher
| Party | Candidate | Votes | % | ±% |
|---|---|---|---|---|
| Country | Charles Adermann | 26,953 | 66.1 | −33.9 |
| Labor | William Weir | 10,337 | 25.4 | +25.4 |
| Queensland Labor | James Humphries | 3,465 | 8.5 | +8.5 |
| Total formal votes | | 40,755 | 98.2 | |
| Informal votes | | 741 | 1.8 | |
| Turnout | | 41,496 | 96.3 | |
Two-party-preferred result
| Country | Charles Adermann | | 72.9 | −27.1 |
| Labor | William Weir | | 27.1 | +27.1 |
| Country hold | | Swing | −27.1 | |

=== Griffith ===
This section is an excerpt from Electoral results for the Division of Griffith § 1958

1958 Australian federal election: Griffith
| Party | Candidate | Votes | % | ±% |
|---|---|---|---|---|
| Labor | Wilfred Coutts | 18,136 | 46.3 | −5.0 |
| Liberal | Arthur Chresby | 15,493 | 39.6 | −9.1 |
| Queensland Labor | Gregory Kehoe | 5,507 | 14.1 | +14.1 |
| Total formal votes | | 39,136 | 96.4 | |
| Informal votes | | 1,479 | 3.6 | |
| Turnout | | 40,615 | 96.1 | |
Two-party-preferred result
| Liberal | Arthur Chresby | 19,593 | 50.1 | +1.4 |
| Labor | Wilfred Coutts | 19,543 | 49.9 | −1.4 |
| Liberal gain from Labor | | Swing | +1.4 | |

=== Herbert ===
This section is an excerpt from Electoral results for the Division of Herbert § 1958

1958 Australian federal election: Herbert
| Party | Candidate | Votes | % | ±% |
|---|---|---|---|---|
| Liberal | John Murray | 16,669 | 42.6 | −0.2 |
| Labor | Bill Edmonds | 16,249 | 41.6 | −9.2 |
| Queensland Labor | Victor Bodero | 5,496 | 14.1 | +14.1 |
| Communist | Hugh Fay | 702 | 1.8 | −4.7 |
| Total formal votes | | 39,116 | 95.8 | |
| Informal votes | | 1,727 | 4.2 | |
| Turnout | | 40,843 | 94.5 | |
Two-party-preferred result
| Liberal | John Murray | 20,136 | 51.5 | +8.1 |
| Labor | Bill Edmonds | 18,980 | 48.5 | −8.1 |
| Liberal gain from Labor | | Swing | +8.1 | |

=== Kennedy ===
This section is an excerpt from Electoral results for the Division of Kennedy § 1958

1958 Australian federal election: Kennedy
| Party | Candidate | Votes | % | ±% |
|---|---|---|---|---|
| Labor | Bill Riordan | 16,075 | 50.9 | −7.3 |
| Country | Alexander Hindson | 10,466 | 33.2 | −8.6 |
| Queensland Labor | Bob Katter, Sr. | 5,026 | 15.9 | +15.9 |
| Total formal votes | | 31,567 | 97.1 | |
| Informal votes | | 947 | 2.9 | |
| Turnout | | 32,514 | 88.1 | |
Two-party-preferred result
| Labor | Bill Riordan | | 54.1 | −4.1 |
| Country | Alexander Hindson | | 45.9 | +4.1 |
| Labor hold | | Swing | −4.1 | |

=== Leichhardt ===
This section is an excerpt from Electoral results for the Division of Leichhardt § 1958

1958 Australian federal election: Leichhardt
| Party | Candidate | Votes | % | ±% |
|---|---|---|---|---|
| Labor | Bill Fulton | 18,234 | 47.2 | −2.7 |
| Country | Michael Turner | 14,021 | 36.3 | −11.8 |
| Queensland Labor | James Bidner | 6,407 | 16.6 | +16.6 |
| Total formal votes | | 38,662 | 97.2 | |
| Informal votes | | 1,099 | 2.8 | |
| Turnout | | 39,761 | 91.5 | |
Two-party-preferred result
| Labor | Bill Fulton | 21,719 | 56.2 | +4.5 |
| Country | George Turner | 16,943 | 43.8 | −4.5 |
| Labor hold | | Swing | +4.5 | |

=== Lilley ===
This section is an excerpt from Electoral results for the Division of Lilley § 1958

1958 Australian federal election: Lilley
| Party | Candidate | Votes | % | ±% |
|---|---|---|---|---|
| Liberal | Bruce Wight | 21,272 | 51.4 | −6.7 |
| Labor | Jack Melloy | 14,170 | 34.3 | −7.6 |
| Queensland Labor | Walter Barnes | 5,606 | 13.6 | +13.6 |
| Australian Nationalist | Mervyn Goldstiver | 312 | 0.8 | +0.8 |
| Total formal votes | | 41,360 | 96.6 | |
| Informal votes | | 1,472 | 3.4 | |
| Turnout | | 42,832 | 94.4 | |
Two-party-preferred result
| Liberal | Bruce Wight | | 61.9 | +3.8 |
| Labor | Jack Melloy | | 38.1 | −3.8 |
| Liberal hold | | Swing | +3.8 | |

=== Maranoa ===
This section is an excerpt from Electoral results for the Division of Maranoa § 1958

1958 Australian federal election: Maranoa
| Party | Candidate | Votes | % | ±% |
|---|---|---|---|---|
| Country | Wilfred Brimblecombe | 18,699 | 51.8 | +7.2 |
| Labor | Leslie Beaumont | 12,384 | 34.3 | +34.3 |
| Queensland Labor | Alfred Dohring | 5,027 | 13.9 | +13.9 |
| Total formal votes | | 36,110 | 98.2 | |
| Informal votes | | 660 | 1.8 | |
| Turnout | | 36,770 | 92.0 | |
Two-party-preferred result
| Country | Wilfred Brimblecombe | | 62.9 | +11.8 |
| Labor | Leslie Beaumont | | 37.1 | +37.1 |
| Country hold | | Swing | +11.8 | |

=== McPherson ===
This section is an excerpt from Electoral results for the Division of McPherson § 1958

1958 Australian federal election: McPherson
| Party | Candidate | Votes | % | ±% |
|---|---|---|---|---|
| Country | Charles Barnes | 29,346 | 63.1 | +3.6 |
| Labor | Harold Evans | 12,730 | 27.4 | −1.9 |
| Queensland Labor | John Hilton | 4,413 | 9.5 | +9.5 |
| Total formal votes | | 46,489 | 97.5 | |
| Informal votes | | 1,202 | 2.5 | |
| Turnout | | 47,691 | 94.1 | |
Two-party-preferred result
| Country | Charles Barnes | | 70.7 | +5.6 |
| Labor | Harold Evans | | 29.3 | −5.6 |
| Country hold | | Swing | +5.6 | |

=== Moreton ===
This section is an excerpt from Electoral results for the Division of Moreton § 1958

1958 Australian federal election: Moreton
| Party | Candidate | Votes | % | ±% |
|---|---|---|---|---|
| Liberal | James Killen | 23,460 | 50.9 | −0.8 |
| Labor | Bernard Ouston | 16,687 | 36.2 | −10.3 |
| Queensland Labor | Ted Mansfield | 4,652 | 10.1 | +10.1 |
| Communist | Max Julius | 1,297 | 2.8 | +1.0 |
| Total formal votes | | 46,096 | 96.1 | |
| Informal votes | | 1,888 | 3.9 | |
| Turnout | | 47,984 | 96.6 | |
Two-party-preferred result
| Liberal | James Killen | | 60.3 | +8.4 |
| Labor | Bernard Ouston | | 39.7 | −8.4 |
| Liberal hold | | Swing | +8.4 | |

=== Oxley ===
This section is an excerpt from Electoral results for the Division of Oxley § 1958

1958 Australian federal election: Oxley
| Party | Candidate | Votes | % | ±% |
|---|---|---|---|---|
| Liberal | Donald Cameron | 22,555 | 55.7 | −3.5 |
| Labor | Robert Warren | 19,966 | 41.9 | +5.4 |
| Communist | Wallace Dawson | 939 | 2.3 | +0.6 |
| Total formal votes | | 40,460 | 97.8 | |
| Informal votes | | 927 | 2.2 | |
| Turnout | | 41,387 | 96.9 | |
Two-party-preferred result
| Liberal | Donald Cameron | | 55.9 | −4.9 |
| Labor | Robert Warren | | 44.1 | +4.9 |
| Liberal hold | | Swing | −4.9 | |

=== Petrie ===
This section is an excerpt from Electoral results for the Division of Petrie § 1958

1958 Australian federal election: Petrie
| Party | Candidate | Votes | % | ±% |
|---|---|---|---|---|
| Liberal | Alan Hulme | 23,682 | 50.5 | −6.3 |
| Labor | John Claffey | 16,376 | 34.9 | −8.3 |
| Queensland Labor | Maxwell McCurdie | 5,081 | 10.8 | +10.8 |
| Australian Nationalist | Horace Burge | 1,776 | 3.8 | +3.8 |
| Total formal votes | | 46,915 | 96.1 | |
| Informal votes | | 1,910 | 3.9 | |
| Turnout | | 48,825 | 96.3 | |
Two-party-preferred result
| Liberal | Alan Hulme | | 60.5 | +3.7 |
| Labor | John Claffey | | 39.5 | −3.7 |
| Liberal hold | | Swing | +3.7 | |

=== Ryan ===
This section is an excerpt from Electoral results for the Division of Ryan § 1958

1958 Australian federal election: Ryan
| Party | Candidate | Votes | % | ±% |
|---|---|---|---|---|
| Liberal | Nigel Drury | 25,770 | 58.0 | −2.8 |
| Labor | Bernard McDonnell | 13,232 | 29.8 | −9.4 |
| Queensland Labor | Bryan Hurley | 4,613 | 10.4 | +10.4 |
| Australian Nationalist | Ronald Edmonds | 795 | 1.8 | +1.8 |
| Total formal votes | | 44,410 | 96.7 | |
| Informal votes | | 1,493 | 3.3 | |
| Turnout | | 45,903 | 96.2 | |
Two-party-preferred result
| Liberal | Nigel Drury | | 67.2 | +6.4 |
| Labor | Bernard McDonnell | | 32.8 | −6.4 |
| Liberal hold | | Swing | +6.4 | |

=== Wide Bay ===
This section is an excerpt from Electoral results for the Division of Wide Bay § 1958

1958 Australian federal election: Wide Bay
| Party | Candidate | Votes | % | ±% |
|---|---|---|---|---|
| Country | Henry Bandidt | 19,184 | 47.7 | −7.5 |
| Labor | Brendan Hansen | 16,498 | 41.0 | −3.8 |
| Queensland Labor | Edward McDonnell | 4,526 | 11.3 | +11.3 |
| Total formal votes | | 40,208 | 98.3 | |
| Informal votes | | 697 | 1.7 | |
| Turnout | | 40,905 | 97.0 | |
Two-party-preferred result
| Country | Henry Bandidt | 21,815 | 54.3 | −0.9 |
| Labor | Brendan Hansen | 18,393 | 45.7 | +0.9 |
| Country hold | | Swing | −0.9 | |

== South Australia ==
1958 Australian federal election (South Australia)
| ← 1955 | 22 November 1958 | 1961 → |

All 11 SA seats in the House of Representatives 6 seats needed for a majority
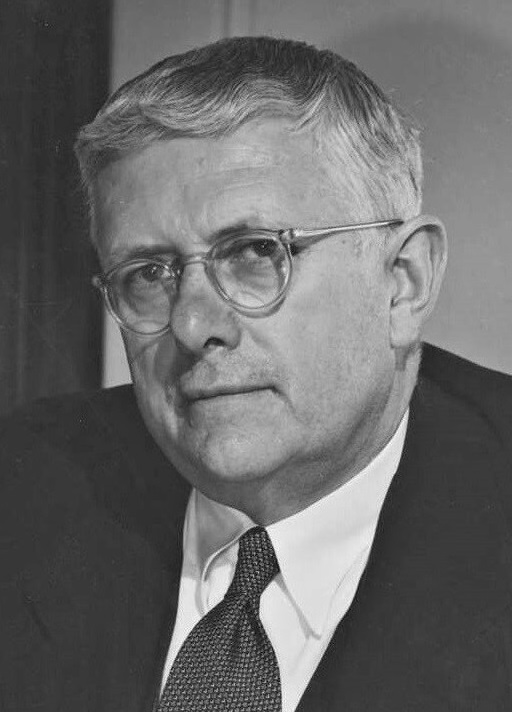

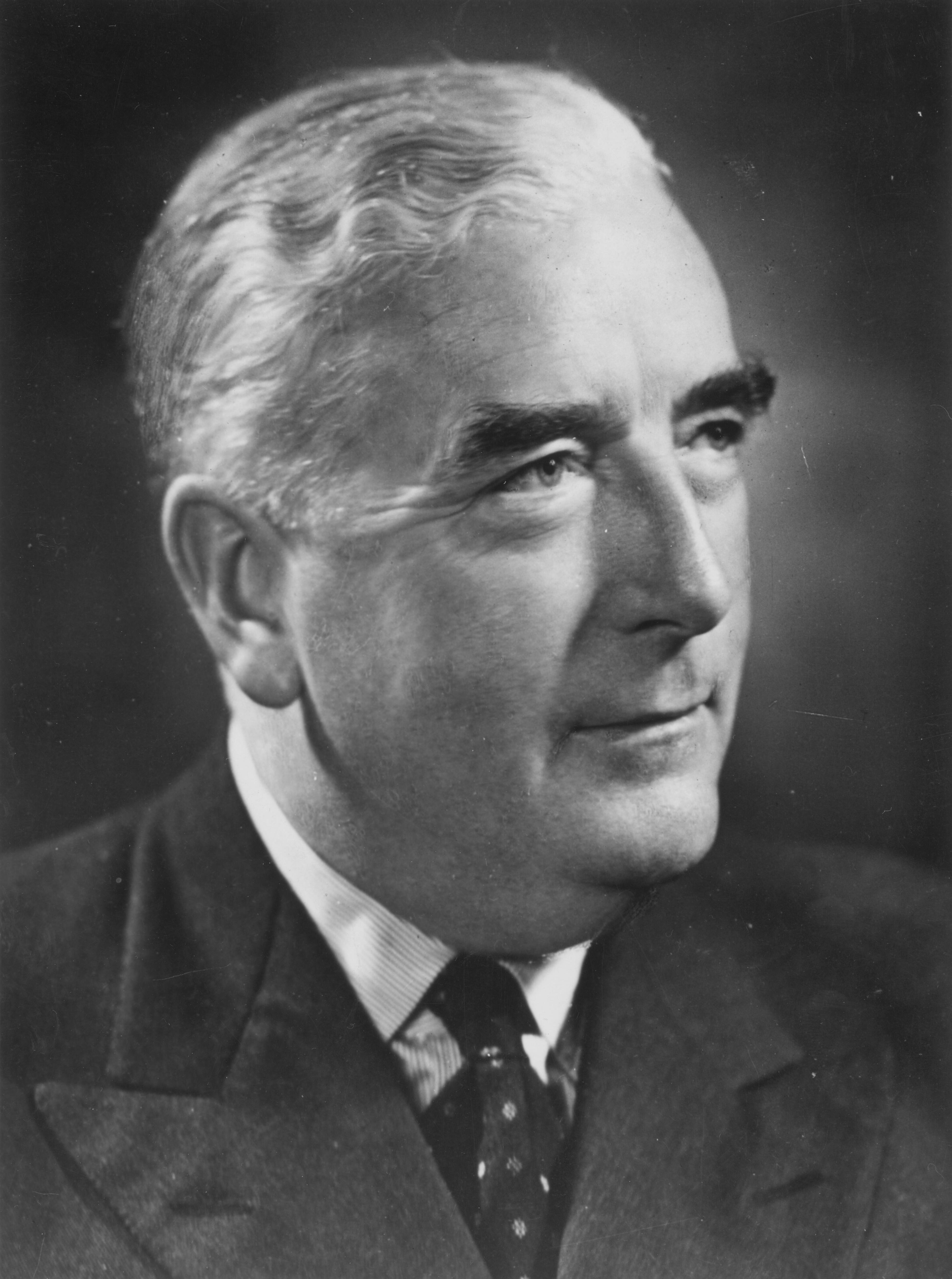
| | First party | Second party |
|---|---|---|
| Leader | H. V. Evatt | Robert Menzies |
| Party | Labor | Coalition |
| Seats before | 6 | 5 |
| Seats won | 6 | 5 |
| Seat change | Steady | Steady |
| Popular vote | 217,727 | 205,810 |
| Percentage | 47.5% | 44.9% |
| Swing | ▼1.2pp | ▼1.3pp |
| TPP | 49.8% | 50.2% |
| TPP swing | ▲0.8pp | ▼0.8pp |

=== Adelaide ===
This section is an excerpt from Electoral results for the Division of Adelaide § 1958

1958 Australian federal election: Adelaide
| Party | Candidate | Votes | % | ±% |
|---|---|---|---|---|
| Labor | Joe Sexton | 17,869 | 50.0 | −0.6 |
| Liberal | Ian Wilson | 14,226 | 39.8 | +3.7 |
| Democratic Labor | Baylon Ryan | 3,642 | 10.2 | −1.6 |
| Total formal votes | | 35,737 | 95.9 | |
| Informal votes | | 1,530 | 4.1 | |
| Turnout | | 37,267 | 94.2 | |
Two-party-preferred result
| Labor | Joe Sexton | | 52.8 | −2.5 |
| Liberal | Ian Wilson | | 47.2 | +2.5 |
| Labor hold | | Swing | −2.5 | |

=== Angas ===
This section is an excerpt from Electoral results for the Division of Angas (1949–1977) § 1949

1958 Australian federal election: Angas
| Party | Candidate | Votes | % | ±% |
|---|---|---|---|---|
| Liberal | Alick Downer | 23,987 | 61.4 | −8.6 |
| Labor | Darcy Nielsen | 11,832 | 30.3 | +4.6 |
| Democratic Labor | Susan Critchley | 2,581 | 6.6 | +6.6 |
| Independent | Sydney Edwards | 677 | 1.7 | +1.7 |
| Total formal votes | | 39,077 | 96.7 | |
| Informal votes | | 1,336 | 3.3 | |
| Turnout | | 40,413 | 97.0 | |
Two-party-preferred result
| Liberal | Alick Downer | | 67.7 | −4.5 |
| Labor | Darcy Nielsen | | 32.3 | +4.5 |
| Liberal hold | | Swing | −4.5 | |

=== Barker ===
This section is an excerpt from Electoral results for the Division of Barker § 1958

1958 Australian federal election: Barker
| Party | Candidate | Votes | % | ±% |
|---|---|---|---|---|
| Liberal | Jim Forbes | 25,146 | 60.3 | −7.4 |
| Labor | Norman Alcock | 14,860 | 35.7 | +3.4 |
| Democratic Labor | Frank Marshall | 1,670 | 4.0 | +4.0 |
| Total formal votes | | 41,676 | 98.4 | |
| Informal votes | | 1,107 | 2.6 | |
| Turnout | | 42,783 | 97.3 | |
Two-party-preferred result
| Liberal | Jim Forbes | | 63.5 | −4.2 |
| Labor | Norman Alcock | | 36.5 | +4.2 |
| Liberal hold | | Swing | −4.2 | |

=== Bonython ===
This section is an excerpt from Electoral results for the Division of Bonython § 1958

1958 Australian federal election: Bonython
| Party | Candidate | Votes | % | ±% |
|---|---|---|---|---|
| Labor | Norman Makin | 27,598 | 61.3 | −8.1 |
| Liberal | Thomas Foale | 12,781 | 28.4 | −2.2 |
| Communist | Joseph Buchanan | 2,470 | 5.5 | +5.5 |
| Democratic Labor | Edward Timlin | 2,206 | 5.5 | +5.5 |
| Total formal votes | | 45,055 | 95.8 | |
| Informal votes | | 1,976 | 4.2 | |
| Turnout | | 47,031 | 96.7 | |
Two-party-preferred result
| Labor | Norman Makin | | 66.3 | −3.1 |
| Liberal | Thomas Foale | | 33.7 | +3.1 |
| Labor hold | | Swing | −3.1 | |

=== Boothby ===
This section is an excerpt from Electoral results for the Division of Boothby § 1958

1958 Australian federal election: Boothby
| Party | Candidate | Votes | % | ±% |
|---|---|---|---|---|
| Liberal | John McLeay | 22,401 | 55.6 | −0.6 |
| Labor | Ralph Dettman | 14,958 | 37.1 | +1.5 |
| Democratic Labor | George Hodgson | 2,907 | 7.2 | −1.0 |
| Total formal votes | | 40,266 | 97.0 | |
| Informal votes | | 1,244 | 3.0 | |
| Turnout | | 41,510 | 96.5 | |
Two-party-preferred result
| Liberal | John McLeay | | 61.4 | −1.4 |
| Labor | Ralph Dettman | | 38.6 | +1.4 |
| Liberal hold | | Swing | −1.4 | |

=== Grey ===
This section is an excerpt from Electoral results for the Division of Grey § 1958

1958 Australian federal election: Grey
| Party | Candidate | Votes | % | ±% |
|---|---|---|---|---|
| Labor | Edgar Russell | 21,323 | 53.5 | −3.2 |
| Liberal | David Gunn | 16,233 | 40.8 | −2.5 |
| Democratic Labor | Richard Mills | 1,755 | 4.4 | +4.4 |
| Independent | Frank Rieck | 513 | 1.3 | +1.3 |
| Total formal votes | | 39,824 | 97.2 | |
| Informal votes | | 1,156 | 2.8 | |
| Turnout | | 40,980 | 96.1 | |
Two-party-preferred result
| Labor | Edgar Russell | | 55.0 | −1.7 |
| Liberal | David Gunn | | 45.0 | +1.7 |
| Labor hold | | Swing | −1.7 | |

=== Hindmarsh ===
This section is an excerpt from Electoral results for the Division of Hindmarsh § 1958

1958 Australian federal election: Hindmarsh
| Party | Candidate | Votes | % | ±% |
|---|---|---|---|---|
| Labor | Clyde Cameron | 27,141 | 62.4 | +2.2 |
| Liberal | Alan Smith | 13,550 | 31.2 | +0.4 |
| Democratic Labor | Francis Moran | 2,771 | 6.4 | −2.5 |
| Total formal votes | | 43,462 | 96.6 | |
| Informal votes | | 1,535 | 3.4 | |
| Turnout | | 44,997 | 96.5 | |
Two-party-preferred result
| Labor | Clyde Cameron | | 63.7 | +1.7 |
| Liberal | Alan Smith | | 36.3 | −1.7 |
| Labor hold | | Swing | +1.7 | |

=== Kingston ===
This section is an excerpt from Electoral results for the Division of Kingston § 1958

1958 Australian federal election: Kingston
| Party | Candidate | Votes | % | ±% |
|---|---|---|---|---|
| Labor | Pat Galvin | 25,607 | 50.8 | −0.8 |
| Liberal | Cecil Anderson | 21,442 | 42.6 | −5.8 |
| Democratic Labor | Brian Crowe | 3,321 | 6.6 | +6.6 |
| Total formal votes | | 50,370 | 97.5 | |
| Informal votes | | 1,292 | 2.5 | |
| Turnout | | 51,662 | 96.8 | |
Two-party-preferred result
| Labor | Pat Galvin | | 52.1 | +0.5 |
| Liberal | Cecil Anderson | | 47.9 | −0.5 |
| Labor hold | | Swing | +0.5 | |

=== Port Adelaide ===
This section is an excerpt from Electoral results for the Division of Port Adelaide § 1958

1958 Australian federal election: Port Adelaide
| Party | Candidate | Votes | % | ±% |
|---|---|---|---|---|
| Labor | Albert Thompson | 28,627 | 68.7 | −16.0 |
| Liberal | David Garvie | 9,875 | 23.7 | +23.7 |
| Democratic Labor | Gerald Shinnick | 2,386 | 5.7 | +5.7 |
| Communist | Peter Symon | 795 | 1.9 | −13.4 |
| Total formal votes | | 41,683 | 96.1 | |
| Informal votes | | 1,683 | 3.9 | |
| Turnout | | 43,366 | 96.7 | |
Two-party-preferred result
| Labor | Albert Thompson | | 71.5 | −13.2 |
| Liberal | David Garvie | | 28.5 | +28.5 |
| Labor hold | | Swing | −13.2 | |

=== Sturt ===
This section is an excerpt from Electoral results for the Division of Sturt § 1958

1958 Australian federal election: Sturt
| Party | Candidate | Votes | % | ±% |
|---|---|---|---|---|
| Liberal | Keith Wilson | 24,325 | 57.1 | −3.2 |
| Labor | Siegfried Hausler | 16,013 | 37.6 | −2.1 |
| Democratic Labor | Norman Vowles | 2,266 | 5.3 | +5.3 |
| Total formal votes | | 42,604 | 97.0 | |
| Informal votes | | 1,333 | 3.0 | |
| Turnout | | 43,937 | 96.4 | |
Two-party-preferred result
| Liberal | Keith Wilson | | 61.3 | +1.0 |
| Labor | Siegfried Hausler | | 38.7 | −1.0 |
| Liberal hold | | Swing | +1.0 | |

=== Wakefield ===
This section is an excerpt from Electoral results for the Division of Wakefield § 1958

1958 Australian federal election: Wakefield
| Party | Candidate | Votes | % | ±% |
|---|---|---|---|---|
| Liberal | Bert Kelly | 21,844 | 56.8 | −5.4 |
| Labor | Leonard Krieg | 11,899 | 30.9 | −1.5 |
| Independent | Hector Henstridge | 2,518 | 6.5 | +1.1 |
| Democratic Labor | Leo Redden | 2,198 | 5.7 | +5.7 |
| Total formal votes | | 38,459 | 96.4 | |
| Informal votes | | 1,427 | 3.6 | |
| Turnout | | 39,886 | 97.2 | |
Two-party-preferred result
| Liberal | Bert Kelly | | 65.1 | +0.2 |
| Labor | Leonard Krieg | | 34.9 | −0.2 |
| Liberal hold | | Swing | +0.2 | |

== Western Australia ==
1958 Australian federal election (Western Australia)
| ← 1955 | 22 November 1958 | 1961 → |

All 9 WA seats in the House of Representatives 5 seats needed for a majority
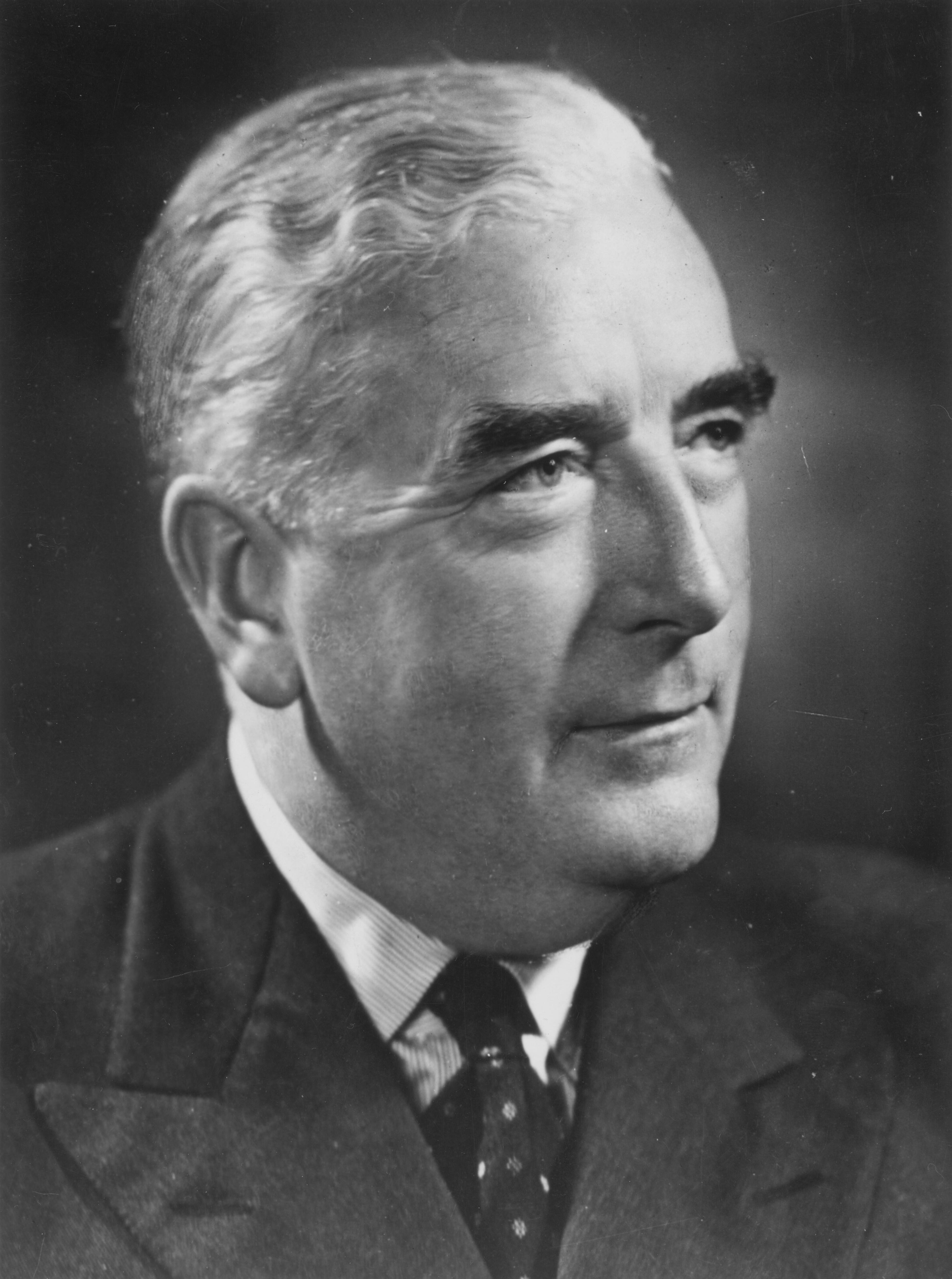

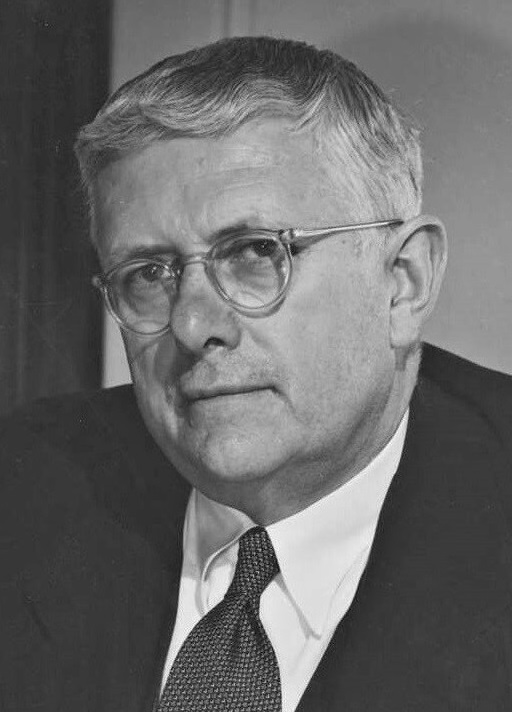
| | First party | Second party |
|---|---|---|
| Leader | Robert Menzies | H. V. Evatt |
| Party | Coalition | Labor |
| Seats before | 6 | 3 |
| Seats won | 8 | 1 |
| Seat change | ▲2 | ▼2 |
| Popular vote | 176,772 | 116,302 |
| Percentage | 53.2% | 35.0% |
| Swing | ▲12.0pp | ▼16.9pp |
| TPP | 59.2% | 40.8% |
| TPP swing | ▲2.7pp | ▼2.7pp |

=== Canning ===
This section is an excerpt from Electoral results for the Division of Canning § 1958

1958 Australian federal election: Canning
| Party | Candidate | Votes | % | ±% |
|---|---|---|---|---|
| Country | Len Hamilton | 24,763 | 72.4 | −27.6 |
| Democratic Labor | Patrick Cranley | 9,447 | 27.6 | +27.6 |
| Total formal votes | | 34,210 | 94.7 | |
| Informal votes | | 1,930 | 5.3 | |
| Turnout | | 36,140 | 95.0 | |
| Country hold | | Swing | −27.6 | |

=== Curtin ===
This section is an excerpt from Electoral results for the Division of Curtin § 1958

1958 Australian federal election: Curtin
| Party | Candidate | Votes | % | ±% |
|---|---|---|---|---|
| Liberal | Paul Hasluck | 24,605 | 63.7 | −36.3 |
| Labor | Frederick Traine | 8,576 | 22.2 | +22.2 |
| Democratic Labor | John Antill | 5,440 | 14.1 | +14.1 |
| Total formal votes | | | | |
| Informal votes | | | | |
| Turnout | | | | |
Two-party-preferred result
| Liberal | Paul Hasluck | | 75.2 | −24.8 |
| Labor | Frederick Traine | | 24.8 | +24.8 |
| Liberal hold | | Swing | −24.8 | |

=== Forrest ===
This section is an excerpt from Electoral results for the Division of Forrest § 1958

1958 Australian federal election: Forrest
| Party | Candidate | Votes | % | ±% |
|---|---|---|---|---|
| Liberal | Gordon Freeth | 19,273 | 51.6 | −48.4 |
| Labor | Ernest Stapleton | 14,480 | 38.8 | +38.8 |
| Democratic Labor | Arthur Addis | 3,600 | 9.6 | +9.6 |
| Total formal votes | | 37,353 | 96.6 | |
| Informal votes | | 1,317 | 3.4 | |
| Turnout | | 38,670 | 97.0 | |
Two-party-preferred result
| Liberal | Gordon Freeth | | 59.5 | −40.5 |
| Labor | Ernest Stapleton | | 40.5 | +40.5 |
| Liberal hold | | Swing | −40.5 | |

=== Fremantle ===
This section is an excerpt from Electoral results for the Division of Fremantle § 1958

1958 Australian federal election: Fremantle
| Party | Candidate | Votes | % | ±% |
|---|---|---|---|---|
| Labor | Kim Beazley Sr. | 23,780 | 57.2 | +0.1 |
| Liberal | Peter Goode | 16,725 | 40.2 | +0.4 |
| Communist | Paddy Troy | 1,051 | 2.5 | −0.7 |
| Total formal votes | | 41,556 | 97.3 | |
| Informal votes | | 1,134 | 2.7 | |
| Turnout | | 42,690 | 95.7 | |
Two-party-preferred result
| Labor | Kim Beazley Sr. | | 59.5 | −0.5 |
| Liberal | Peter Goode | | 40.5 | +0.5 |
| Labor hold | | Swing | −0.5 | |

=== Kalgoorlie ===
This section is an excerpt from Electoral results for the Division of Kalgoorlie § 1958

1958 Australian federal election: Kalgoorlie
| Party | Candidate | Votes | % | ±% |
|---|---|---|---|---|
| Labor | Fred Collard | 12,519 | 44.3 | −16.8 |
| Liberal | Peter Browne | 10,337 | 36.6 | +36.6 |
| Democratic Labor | Antonius Berkhout | 3,363 | 11.9 | +11.9 |
| Independent | Harold Illingworth | 2,056 | 7.3 | −31.6 |
| Total formal votes | | 28,275 | 96.6 | |
| Informal votes | | 1,008 | 3.4 | |
| Turnout | | 29,283 | 93.4 | |
Two-party-preferred result
| Liberal | Peter Browne | 14,227 | 50.3 | +50.3 |
| Labor | Fred Collard | 14,048 | 49.7 | −11.4 |
| Liberal gain from Labor | | Swing | +11.4 | |

=== Moore ===
This section is an excerpt from Electoral results for the Division of Moore § 1958

1958 Australian federal election: Moore
| Party | Candidate | Votes | % | ±% |
|---|---|---|---|---|
| Country | Hugh Leslie | 13,542 | 40.5 | −59.5 |
| Liberal | Vic Halbert | 10,792 | 32.3 | +32.3 |
| Labor | Wilbur Bennett | 9,073 | 27.2 | +27.2 |
| Total formal votes | | 33,407 | 96.7 | |
| Informal votes | | 1,155 | 3.3 | |
| Turnout | | 34,562 | 95.0 | |
Two-party-preferred result
| Liberal | Vic Halbert | 17,679 | 52.9 | +52.9 |
| Country | Hugh Leslie | 15,728 | 47.1 | −52.9 |
| Liberal gain from Country | | Swing | +52.9 | |

=== Perth ===
This section is an excerpt from Electoral results for the Division of Perth § 1958

1958 Australian federal election: Perth
| Party | Candidate | Votes | % | ±% |
|---|---|---|---|---|
| Liberal | Fred Chaney Sr. | 17,426 | 56.0 | +4.5 |
| Labor | Laurie Wilkinson | 9,841 | 31.6 | −16.9 |
| Democratic Labor | Terence Merchant | 3,189 | 10.3 | +10.3 |
| Independent | Claude Swaine | 655 | 2.1 | +2.1 |
| Total formal votes | | 31,111 | 95.7 | |
| Informal votes | | 1,393 | 4.3 | |
| Turnout | | 32,504 | 94.2 | |
Two-party-preferred result
| Liberal | Fred Chaney Sr. | | 65.2 | +13.7 |
| Labor | Laurie Wilkinson | | 34.8 | −13.7 |
| Liberal hold | | Swing | +13.7 | |

=== Stirling ===
This section is an excerpt from Electoral results for the Division of Stirling § 1958

1958 Australian federal election: Stirling
| Party | Candidate | Votes | % | ±% |
|---|---|---|---|---|
| Labor | Harry Webb | 20,936 | 47.4 | −5.4 |
| Liberal | Doug Cash | 17,881 | 40.5 | −6.7 |
| Democratic Labor | Brian Peachey | 4,668 | 10.6 | +10.6 |
| Independent | James Collins | 713 | 1.6 | +1.6 |
| Total formal votes | | 44,198 | 96.0 | |
| Informal votes | | 1,842 | 4.0 | |
| Turnout | | 46,040 | 96.0 | |
Two-party-preferred result
| Liberal | Doug Cash | 22,198 | 50.2 | +3.0 |
| Labor | Harry Webb | 22,000 | 49.8 | −3.0 |
| Liberal gain from Labor | | Swing | +3.0 | |

=== Swan ===
This section is an excerpt from Electoral results for the Division of Swan § 1958

1958 Australian federal election: Swan
| Party | Candidate | Votes | % | ±% |
|---|---|---|---|---|
| Liberal | Richard Cleaver | 21,428 | 49.0 | −8.7 |
| Labor | Keith Dowding | 17,097 | 39.1 | −3.2 |
| Democratic Labor | Charles Noonan | 5,237 | 12.0 | +12.0 |
| Total formal votes | | 43,762 | 96.9 | |
| Informal votes | | 1,394 | 3.1 | |
| Turnout | | 45,156 | 95.8 | |
Two-party-preferred result
| Liberal | Richard Cleaver | 25,140 | 57.4 | −0.3 |
| Labor | Keith Dowding | 18,622 | 42.6 | +0.3 |
| Liberal hold | | Swing | −0.3 | |

== Tasmania ==
1958 Australian federal election (Tasmania)
| ← 1955 | 22 November 1958 | 1961 → |

All 5 Tasmanian seats in the House of Representatives 3 seats needed for a majority
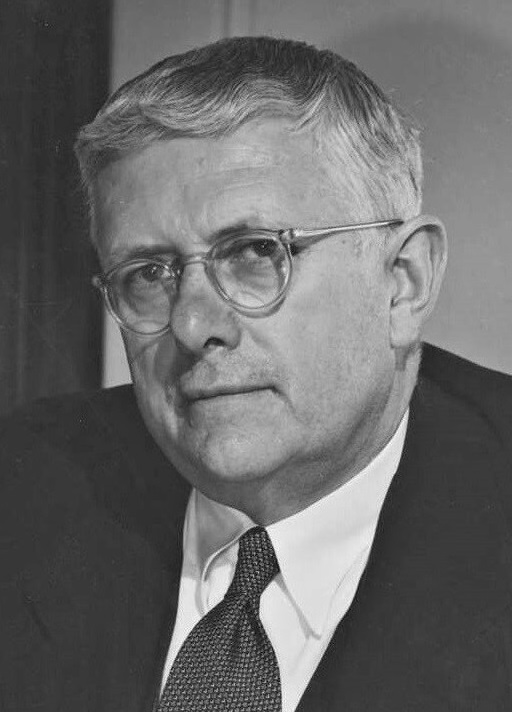

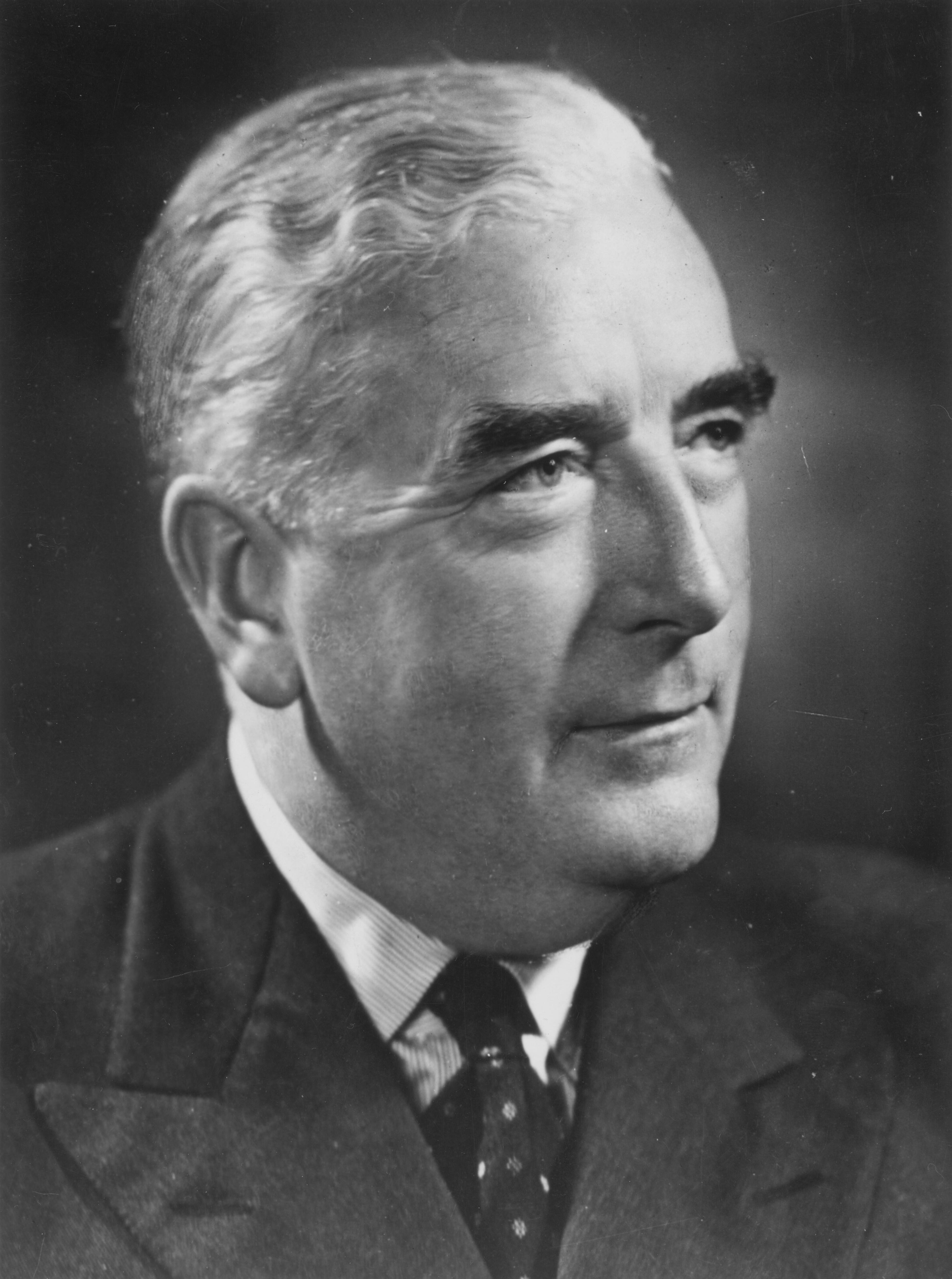
| | First party | Second party |
|---|---|---|
| Leader | H. V. Evatt | Robert Menzies |
| Party | Labor | Coalition |
| Seats before | 2 | 3 |
| Seats won | 3 | 2 |
| Seat change | ▲1 | ▼1 |
| Popular vote | 77,232 | 73,436 |
| Percentage | 46.8% | 44.5% |
| Swing | ▲1.0pp | ▼4.6pp |
| TPP | 49.8% | 50.2% |
| TPP swing | ▲2.3pp | ▼2.3pp |

=== Bass ===
This section is an excerpt from Electoral results for the Division of Bass § 1958

1958 Australian federal election: Bass
| Party | Candidate | Votes | % | ±% |
|---|---|---|---|---|
| Labor | Lance Barnard | 18,800 | 55.6 | +0.1 |
| Liberal | Max Bushby | 12,394 | 36.7 | +0.1 |
| Democratic Labor | Leslie Arnold | 2,610 | 7.7 | −0.2 |
| Total formal votes | | 33,804 | 96.4 | |
| Informal votes | | 1,258 | 3.6 | |
| Turnout | | 35,062 | 97.1 | |
Two-party-preferred result
| Labor | Lance Barnard | | 57.9 | +0.8 |
| Liberal | Max Bushby | | 42.1 | −0.8 |
| Labor hold | | Swing | +0.8 | |

=== Braddon ===
This section is an excerpt from Electoral results for the Division of Braddon § 1958

1958 Australian federal election: Braddon
| Party | Candidate | Votes | % | ±% |
|---|---|---|---|---|
| Labor | Ron Davies | 15,243 | 46.8 | +5.7 |
| Liberal | Aubrey Luck | 14,525 | 44.6 | −14.3 |
| Democratic Labor | Frances Lane | 2,786 | 8.6 | +8.6 |
| Total formal votes | | 32,554 | 96.1 | |
| Informal votes | | 1,334 | 3.9 | |
| Turnout | | 33,888 | 96.0 | |
Two-party-preferred result
| Labor | Ron Davies | 16,420 | 50.4 | +9.3 |
| Liberal | Aubrey Luck | 16,134 | 49.6 | −9.3 |
| Labor gain from Liberal | | Swing | +9.3 | |

=== Denison ===
This section is an excerpt from Electoral results for the Division of Denison § 1958

1958 Australian federal election: Denison
| Party | Candidate | Votes | % | ±% |
|---|---|---|---|---|
| Liberal | Athol Townley | 17,705 | 52.6 | −4.9 |
| Labor | Bert Lacey | 11,926 | 35.4 | −1.4 |
| Democratic Labor | Harold Senior | 2,775 | 8.2 | +8.2 |
| Communist | Max Bound | 1,249 | 3.7 | −2.0 |
| Total formal votes | | 33,655 | 95.1 | |
| Informal votes | | 1,744 | 4.9 | |
| Turnout | | 35,399 | 95.2 | |
Two-party-preferred result
| Liberal | Athol Townley | | 59.4 | +1.3 |
| Labor | Bert Lacey | | 40.6 | −1.3 |
| Liberal hold | | Swing | +1.3 | |

=== Franklin ===
This section is an excerpt from Electoral results for the Division of Franklin § 1958

1958 Australian federal election: Franklin
| Party | Candidate | Votes | % | ±% |
|---|---|---|---|---|
| Liberal | Bill Falkinder | 17,484 | 54.1 | +0.5 |
| Labor | Lynda Heaven | 11,846 | 36.7 | −3.6 |
| Democratic Labor | Henry Scoles | 2,973 | 9.2 | +3.1 |
| Total formal votes | | 32,303 | 95.5 | |
| Informal votes | | 1,522 | 4.5 | |
| Turnout | | 33,825 | 96.3 | |
Two-party-preferred result
| Liberal | Bill Falkinder | | 61.5 | +3.0 |
| Labor | Lynda Heaven | | 38.5 | −3.0 |
| Liberal hold | | Swing | +3.0 | |

=== Wilmot ===
This section is an excerpt from Electoral results for the Division of Wilmot § 1958

1958 Australian federal election: Wilmot
| Party | Candidate | Votes | % | ±% |
|---|---|---|---|---|
| Labor | Gil Duthie | 19,417 | 59.6 | +4.6 |
| Liberal | Ralph Cameron | 11,328 | 34.8 | −4.4 |
| Democratic Labor | Francis Lillis | 1,845 | 5.7 | +0.0 |
| Total formal votes | | 32,590 | 96.6 | |
| Informal votes | | 1,147 | 3.4 | |
| Turnout | | 33,737 | 96.4 | |
Two-party-preferred result
| Labor | Gil Duthie | | 60.7 | +4.6 |
| Liberal | Ralph Cameron | | 39.3 | −4.6 |
| Labor hold | | Swing | +4.6 | |

== Territories ==
=== Australian Capital Territory ===
1958 Australian federal election (Australian Capital Territory)
| ← 1955 | 22 November 1958 | 1961 → |

Division of Australian Capital Territory
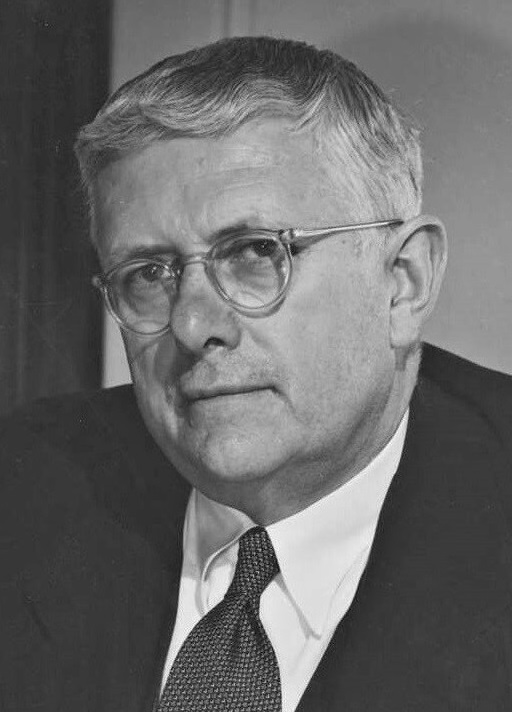

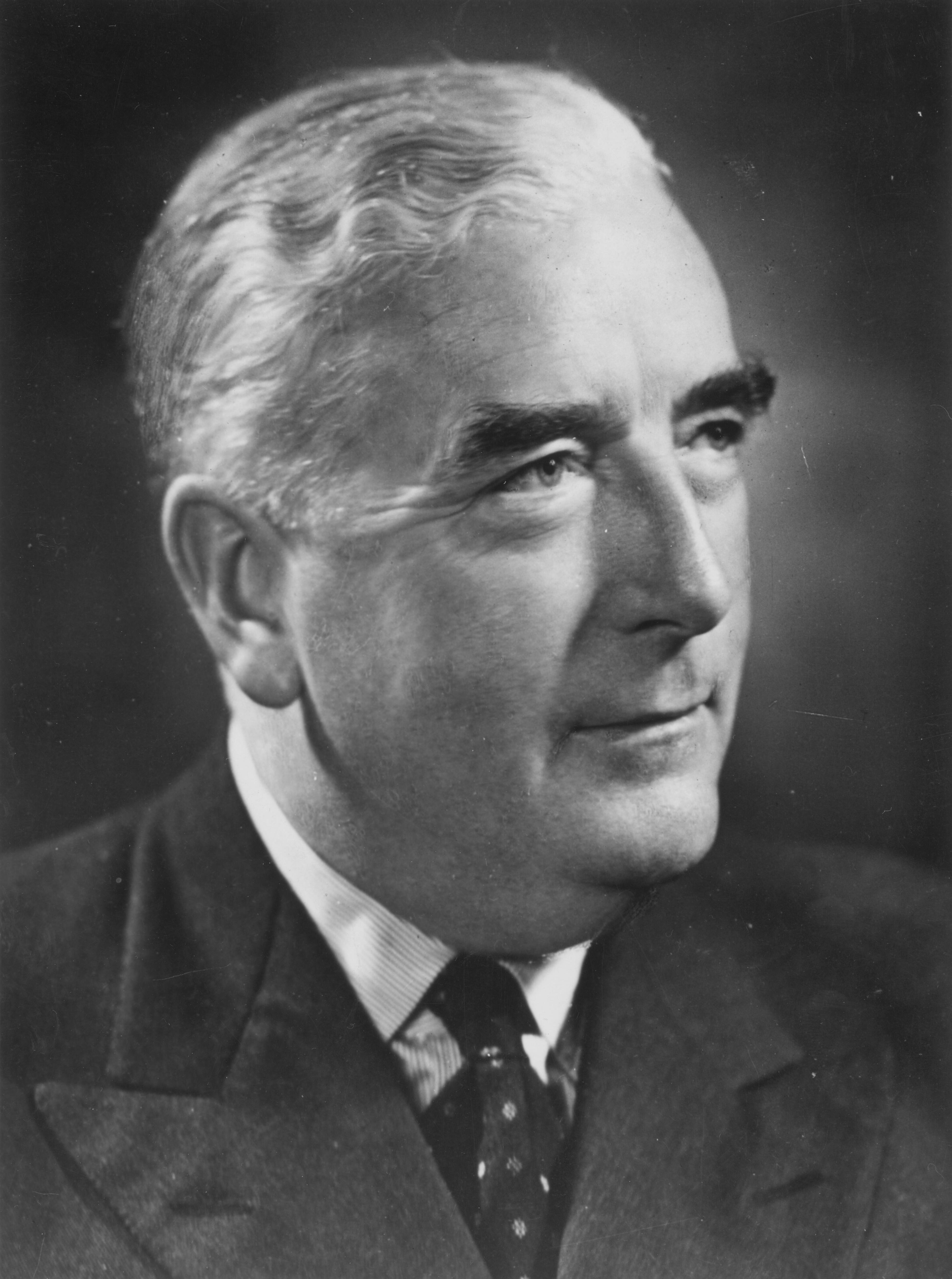
| | First party | Second party |
|---|---|---|
| Leader | H. V. Evatt | Robert Menzies |
| Party | Labor | Coalition |
| Seats before | 1 | 0 |
| Seats won | 1 | 0 |
| Seat change | Steady | Steady |
| Popular vote | 11,980 | 4,383 |
| Percentage | 63.4% | 23.2% |
| Swing | ▼1.2pp | ▼12.2pp |
| TPP | 66.8% | 23.2% |
| TPP swing | ▲2.2pp | ▼2.2pp |

This section is an excerpt from Electoral results for the Division of Australian Capital Territory § 1958

1958 Australian federal election: Australian Capital Territory
| Party | Candidate | Votes | % | ±% |
|---|---|---|---|---|
| Labor | Jim Fraser | 11,980 | 63.4 | −1.2 |
| Liberal | Anne Dalgarno | 4,383 | 23.2 | −12.2 |
| Independent | Phil Day | 2,534 | 13.4 | +13.4 |
| Total formal votes | | 18,897 | 98.7 | |
| Informal votes | | 251 | 1.3 | |
| Turnout | | 19,148 | 93.2 | |
Two-party-preferred result
| Labor | Jim Fraser | | 66.8 | +2.2 |
| Liberal | Anne Dalgarno | | 23.2 | −2.2 |
| Labor hold | | Swing | +2.2 | |

=== Northern Territory ===
This section is an excerpt from Electoral results for the Division of Northern Territory § 1958

1958 Australian federal election: Northern Territory
| Party | Candidate | Votes | % | ±% |
|---|---|---|---|---|
| Labor | Jock Nelson | 4,153 | 73.9 | −26.1 |
| Independent | James Martin | 1,469 | 26.1 | +26.1 |
| Total formal votes | | 5,622 | 96.2 | |
| Informal votes | | 221 | 3.8 | |
| Turnout | | 5,843 | 76.1 | |
| Labor hold | | Swing | −26.1 | |

== See also ==
- Candidates of the 1958 Australian federal election
- Members of the Australian House of Representatives, 1958–1961
