= Sam Goldbloom =

Australian activist (1919–1999)

Samuel Mark Goldbloom AM (31 December 1919 – 25 May 1999) was an Australian peace and human rights activist.

Goldbloom worked in the clothing trade from the age of sixteen. At the outbreak of the Second World War he joined the Commonwealth aircraft factory, becoming shop steward for his sheet metal workers' union. He enlisted as a flight mechanic in the Australian Air Force in 1941. In 1942 he married Rosa Segal. After the war, he became a prominent member of the Australian Labor Party, and was also active in the Jewish Council to Combat Fascism and Anti-Semitism. Goldbloom wrote a book on "German re-armament : the great betrayal". Active in the Victorian Peace Council, he was a founding member, first secretary, and president of the Congress for International Cooperation and Disarmament, and Australian representative on the World Peace Council. He was awarded the Order of Australia in 1990. According to historian, John Ballantyne, the Melbourne branch of the Congress for International Co-operation and Disarmament "was supposedly a broad-based spontaneous movement of peace-lovers, but was in fact effectively controlled by the World Peace Council and the Communist Party. Behind the scenes, running the show, were familiar WPC identities (Alf) Dickie and (Frank) Hartley -- chairman and vice-chairman respectively -- and a brilliant full-time organising secretary, the late pro-Soviet activist Sam Goldbloom. Chairing many of its public sessions was Dr Jim Cairns."
