= Barry Maddern =

Barry James Maddern AC (1937 – 14 January 1994) was an Australian barrister and jurist.

Maddern was born in Geelong to James Alexander Maddern and Lorna Margaret, née Kelly. He worked as an industrial advocate for the oil refining industry before graduating from the University of Melbourne, having studied law. Called to the Bar in 1966, he continued to work for industry, which led to his appointment as Deputy President of the Australian Conciliation and Arbitration Commission in 1980. Promoted to the presidency of the ACAC in 1985, he moved to the Australian Industrial Relations Commission as president in 1989. In 1992 he was awarded the Companion of the Order of Australia. He remained president of the AIRC until his death in 1994.
