= Norman Rothfield =

English-born Australian activist (1912–2010)

Norman Rothfield OAM
- Born: 26 January 1912; Newcastle upon Tyne, U.K.
- Died: 4 June 2010 (aged 98); Australia
- Spouse: Evelyn Dell (m. 1934)

Norman Rothfield OAM (26 January 1912 – 4 June 2010) was an English-born Australian peace and labour activist.

Rothfield was born in Newcastle upon Tyne. In 1934, aged 22, he was elected to Marylbone Borough Council, representing the Labour Party. In 1934 he married Evelyn Dell, and in 1939 migrated to Australia. He joined the Australian Labor Party in 1941 and the Jewish Council to Combat Fascism and Anti-Semitism, of which he became an executive member in 1942. He worked as a women's garments manufacturer and a builder, and promoted the establishment of the State of Israel. In 1947 he became president of the council of the Victorian Jewish Board of Deputies. He ran for election several times on the Labor platform, and campaigned against nuclear weapons and the Vietnam War.

Although he had promoted the establishment of Israel, Rothfield also campaigned vigorously for a separate Palestinean state, and established the Paths for Peace journal in 1974 which supported a negotiated settlement. He established the Australian Jewish Democratic Society in 1984 in response to lack of progressivism in the Jewish community. He and his wife Evelyn were awarded Medals of the Order of Australia in 1998, shortly after Rothfield's memoir, Many Paths to Peace (1997), was published. He published another book, The Trial of God, in 1998. Evelyn died in 2006, but Rothfield remained physically active throughout his nineties. He died in 2010.
