= Candidates of the 1980 Australian federal election =

This article provides information on candidates who stood for the 1980 Australian federal election. The election was held on 18 October 1980.

== Redistributions and seat changes ==
- A redistribution of electoral boundaries occurred in Western Australia.
  - A new seat, the notionally Liberal O'Connor, was created.
- Tasmanian Senator Ken Wriedt (Labor) resigned from the Senate to contest Denison.

== Retiring Members and Senators ==
=== Labor ===
- Gordon Bryant MP (Wills, Vic)
- Clyde Cameron MP (Hindmarsh, SA)
- John FitzPatrick MP (Riverina, NSW)
- Bert James MP (Hunter, NSW)
- Keith Johnson MP (Burke, Vic)
- Vince Martin MP (Banks, NSW)
- Senator Reg Bishop (SA)
- Senator Jim Cavanagh (SA)
- Senator Ron McAuliffe (Qld)
- Senator Justin O'Byrne (Tas)
- Senator John Wheeldon (WA)

=== Liberal ===
- Bill Graham MP (North Sydney, NSW)
- Tony Staley MP (Chisholm, Vic)
- Senator Gordon Davidson (SA)
- Senator Sir Condor Laucke (SA)
- Senator Peter Sim (WA)

=== National Country ===
- James Corbett MP (Maranoa, Qld)
- Philip Lucock MP (Lyne, NSW)

=== Country Liberal ===
- Sam Calder MP (Northern Territory, NT)

== House of Representatives ==
Sitting members at the time of the election are shown in bold text. Successful candidates are highlighted in the relevant colour. Where there is possible confusion, an asterisk (*) is also used.

=== Australian Capital Territory ===
Electorate	Held by	Labor candidate	Liberal candidate	Democrats candidate	Independent candidate
Canberra	Liberal	Ros Kelly	**John Haslem**	Leo Nesic	Kevin Wise
Fraser	Labor	**Ken Fry**	Michael Yabsley	Dimmen de Graaff	Kevin Wise; Basil Yakimov

=== New South Wales ===
Electorate	Held by	Labor candidate	Coalition candidate	Democrats candidate	Other candidates
Banks	Labor	John Mountford	Donald McConnell (Lib)	Montague Greene	
Barton	Liberal	Rodney Madgwick	**Jim Bradfield** (Lib)	Beverley Eley	Charles Bellchambers (Ind)
Bennelong	Liberal	John Guthrie	**John Howard** (Lib)	Pamela Tuckwell	James Darby (Prog)
Berowra	Liberal	George Bennett	**Harry Edwards** (Lib)	James Boow	
Blaxland	Labor	**Paul Keating**	Salvatore Napoli (Lib)	Phillip Grattan	James Doughney (SWP); Craig Marley (SLL)
Bradfield	Liberal	Keith McKeen	**David Connolly** (Lib)	Ilse Robey	
Calare	NCP	David Simmons	**Sandy Mackenzie** (NCP)	Anne Ritter	
Chifley	Labor	**John Armitage**	Philip Daly (Lib)	Keith Watson	Terence Cook (SLL); Geoffrey Evans (CPA)
Cook	Liberal	Ray Thorburn	**Don Dobie** (Lib)	Alexander Kiss	Henry Soper (Prog)
Cowper	NCP	Valma Melville	**Ian Robinson** (NCP)	John Pierce	
Cunningham	Labor	**Stewart West**	Thomas Griffin (Lib)	Megan Sampson	Peter Cockcroft (CPA); Andrew Jamieson (SWP); Richard Moore (SLL)
Dundas	Liberal	Margery Hourihan	**Philip Ruddock** (Lib)	Stephen Bastian	Archibald Brown (Prog)
Eden-Monaro	Liberal	Jim Snow	**Murray Sainsbury** (Lib)	Norma Helmers	
Farrer	Liberal	Lloyd Elliott	**Wal Fife** (Lib)	Rodney Dominish	Maureen Nathan (Prog)
Grayndler	Labor	**Leo McLeay**	George Dryden (Lib)	Albert Jarman	Derek Mortimer (SLL); Justin Walsh (SPA)
Gwydir	NCP	Robert Hamilton	**Ralph Hunt** (NCP)	Gloria Collison	
Hughes	Labor	**Les Johnson**	Chris Downy (Lib)	Questa Gill	Marjorie Wisby (Prog)
Hume	NCP	Sue West	**Stephen Lusher** (NCP)	Gwendoline Wilson	
Hunter	Labor	Bob Brown	Ashley Saunders (Lib)	Edwina Wilson	
Kingsford-Smith	Labor	**Lionel Bowen**	Collin O'Neill (Lib)	Oliver Nekula	
Lowe	Liberal	Jan Burnswoods	**Sir William McMahon** (Lib)	Bradley Mulligan	Anthony Reasha (Ind)
Lyne	NCP	Leslie Brown	Bruce Cowan* (NCP); Milton Morris (Lib)	Edwin Poppleton	
Macarthur	Liberal	Jim Groves	**Michael Baume** (Lib)	Warren Steele	Ronald Sarina (Ind)
Mackellar	Liberal	Kevin Mason	**Jim Carlton** (Lib)	Robert Williams	
Macquarie	Liberal	Ross Free	**Reg Gillard** (Lib)	Richard Jackson-Hope	Raymond Butcher (Ind); Ian Perry (Ind); Ronald Stanton (Ind)
Mitchell	Liberal	Patrick McArdle	**Alan Cadman** (Lib)	Rosemary Mason	
Newcastle	Labor	**Charles Jones**	Richard Bevan (Lib)	John Cleverly	Darrell Dawson (CPA); Geoffrey Payne (SWP)
New England	NCP	Selby Dean	**Ian Sinclair** (NCP)	Fiona Richardson	
North Sydney	Liberal	Maxine Broughton	John Spender (Lib)	Anita Stiller	Josephine Chisholm-Mallett (Ind); Peter Corrie (Prog)
Parramatta	Labor	**John Brown**	Lance Shaw (Lib)	Warwick Barber	Jim Saleam (Ind)
Paterson	NCP	Francis Murray	**Frank O'Keefe** (NCP)	Denis Driver	William Reeve-Parker (Ind)
Phillip	Liberal	Jeannette McHugh	**Jack Birney** (Lib)	Leslie Reiss	Russell Deiley (Ind)
Prospect	Labor	**Dick Klugman**	Alan Byers (Lib)	Robert Goodere	
Reid	Labor	**Tom Uren**	Yvonne Maio (Lib)	Paul Terrett	Neville Gray (Ind)
Richmond	NCP	Terence McGee	**Doug Anthony** (NCP)	Ashley Albanese	
Riverina	Labor	Frederick Smith	Noel Hicks* (NCP); Brian Thornton (Lib)	John Newman	Frederick Martin (Ind)
Robertson	Labor	**Barry Cohen**	Brian Gill (Lib)	Trevor Willsher	Paul Baker (Ind)
Shortland	Labor	**Peter Morris**	Eddie Namir (Lib)	Lionel Lambkin	Robert Buhler (SLL)
St George	Liberal	Bill Morrison	**Maurice Neil** (Lib)	Beverley Davis	
Sydney	Labor	**Les McMahon**	Cliff Reece (Lib)	Maxwell Adams	Juanita Keig (SWP); Judy Mundey (CPA)
Warringah	Liberal	Desmond Murphy	**Michael MacKellar** (Lib)	Arthur Bishop	John McGrath (PCP); David Rennie (Prog)
Wentworth	Liberal	Stephen McGoldrick	**Bob Ellicott** (Lib)	Joan Kersey	
Werriwa	Labor	**John Kerin**	Marie Rutledge (Lib)	Keith Olson	Edward Bell (Ind)

=== Northern Territory ===
Electorate	Held by	Labor candidate	CLP candidate	Democrats candidate	Other candidates
Northern Territory	CLP	John Waters	Grant Tambling	Max Stewart	Pamela Gardiner (Ind); Graham Gillian (MAR); John McElroy (CDP); Malcolm Womersley (Ind); Galarrwuy Yunupingu (Ind)

=== Queensland ===
Electorate	Held by	Labor candidate	Coalition candidate	Democrats candidate	Other candidates
Bowman	Liberal	Len Keogh	**David Jull** (Lib)	Thomas Martin	
Brisbane	Liberal	Manfred Cross	**Peter Johnson** (Lib)	Anthony Walters	William Kenney (Ind)
Capricornia	Labor	**Doug Everingham**	Colin Carige (NCP); William Park (Lib)	Lloyd Webber	Paul Rackemann (Prog)
Darling Downs	NCP	Janet Hunt	**Tom McVeigh** (NCP)	Maria Hayboer	David Proud (Prog)
Dawson	NCP	Barbara Hill	**Ray Braithwaite** (NCP)	Brian Caldwell	Kelly Crombie (Prog); Robert Oakes (Ind)
Fadden	Liberal	David Beddall	**Don Cameron** (Lib)	Janice Barber	Dallas Graham (Prog)
Fisher	NCP	Fay Price	**Evan Adermann** (NCP)	Gavin Black	Rodney Jeanneret (Prog); Gail Perry (Ind)
Griffith	Labor	**Ben Humphreys**	Noel Willersdorf (NCP); Dennis Young (Lib)	Gillian Newman	Mark Carey (SWP)
Herbert	Liberal	Ted Lindsay	**Gordon Dean** (Lib)	John Lamb	
Kennedy	NCP	Susan Hadlow	**Bob Katter** (NCP)		James Fryar (Prog)
Leichhardt	NCP	Anthony Mijo	**David Thomson** (NCP)	Ian Paul	
Lilley	Liberal	Elaine Darling	**Kevin Cairns** (Lib)	Joan Hadley	
Maranoa	NCP	Kenneth Abbey	Ian Cameron* (NCP); Reginald Kerslake (Lib)	Austin Brannigan	
McPherson	Liberal	Walter Ehrich	**Eric Robinson** (Lib)	Ian Crick	William Aabraham-Steer (Ind); Louis Rowan (Ind)
Moreton	Liberal	Barbara Robson	**James Killen** (Lib)	Betty Whitworth	Graham Bell (Ind); Patrick Dixon (Prog)
Oxley	Labor	**Bill Hayden**	Ronda Herrmann (Lib)	Wayne Martin	Miriam Cope (Ind); Robert Voysey (SLL)
Petrie	Liberal	Deane Wells	**John Hodges** (Lib)	Pauline Moylan	Phillip Grimson (Prog)
Ryan	Liberal	Peter Beattie	**John Moore** (Lib)	Geoffrey Rees	Philip Sturgess (Prog)
Wide Bay	NCP	James Finemore	**Clarrie Millar** (NCP)	Geoffrey Schuh	Raymond Bird (Prog)

=== South Australia ===
Electorate	Held by	Labor candidate	Liberal candidate	Democrats candidate	Other candidates
Adelaide	Labor	**Chris Hurford**	Peter Camm	Peter Adamson	
Barker	Liberal	Norman Napper	**James Porter**	Ivor Childs	Anthony Beck (NCP); Kim Ross (NCP)
Bonython	Labor	**Neal Blewett**	Mark Mau	John Longhurst	Donald Keitel (PCP); John Villain (SLL)
Boothby	Liberal	Bruce Whyatt	**John McLeay**	Martin Holt	James Russell (PCP)
Grey	Labor	**Laurie Wallis**	Brian Fitzgerald	Mary Good	Anthony Haskett (NCP)
Hawker	Labor	**Ralph Jacobi**	Mark Hanckel	Kenneth Johnson	
Hindmarsh	Labor	John Scott	George Basisovs	Peter Gagliardi	Therese Doyle (SWP); Alf Gard (Ind)
Kingston	Liberal	Richard Gun	**Grant Chapman**	Judith Jenkins	
Port Adelaide	Labor	**Mick Young**	Shirley de Garis	Robert Manhire	Elliott Johnston (CPA)
Sturt	Liberal	Andrew Dunstan	**Ian Wilson**	David d'Angelo	Colin Wuttke (PCP)
Wakefield	Liberal	Alan Reid	**Geoffrey Giles**	Rowland Beech	Duncan Rose (NCP)

=== Tasmania ===
Electorate	Held by	Labor candidate	Liberal candidate	Democrats candidate	Independent candidate
Bass	Liberal	Patti Warn	**Kevin Newman**		Olga Scully
Braddon	Liberal	Lance Fee	**Ray Groom**		
Denison	Liberal	Ken Wriedt	**Michael Hodgman**	Peter Creet	
Franklin	Liberal	Fran Bladel	**Bruce Goodluck**	John Thomson	
Wilmot	Liberal	David Llewellyn	**Max Burr**		

=== Victoria ===
Electorate	Held by	Labor candidate	Coalition candidate	Democrats candidate	DLP candidate	Other candidates
Balaclava	Liberal	Christopher Kennedy	**Ian Macphee** (Lib)	Zelma Furey		
Ballarat	Liberal	John Mildren	**Jim Short** (Lib)	Graham Gough	John Cotter	
Batman	Labor	**Brian Howe**	Rosemary Kemp (Lib)	Jeffrey McAlpine	Allen Doyle	
Bendigo	Liberal	Victor Dolby	**John Bourchier** (Lib)	George Hunter		
Bruce	Liberal	Gayle Whyte	**Sir Billy Snedden** (Lib)	Fraser Hercus	Elaine Mulholland	Wilhelm Kapphan (Ind)
Burke	Labor	Andrew Theophanous	Greg Ross (Lib)	Eric Spencer		
Casey	Liberal	Peter Watson	**Peter Falconer** (Lib)	Basil Smith		Martin Hetherich (UCP); Wilfrid Thiele (Ind); Bertram Wainer (Ind)
Chisholm	Liberal	Helen Mayer	Graham Harris (Lib)	Alan Swindon		Terence Pooley (AP)
Corangamite	Liberal	Neil Gedge	**Tony Street** (Lib)	Kathleen May	Bernie Finn	
Corio	Labor	**Gordon Scholes**	Mieczyslaw Parks (Lib)	Reginald Sweeten	James Jordan	
Deakin	Liberal	John Madden	**Alan Jarman** (Lib)	Edwin Adamson	Peter Ferwerda	
Diamond Valley	Liberal	John Scomparin	**Neil Brown** (Lib)	Geoffrey Loftus-Hills		
Flinders	Liberal	Jean McLean	**Phillip Lynch** (Lib)	William Towers		
Gellibrand	Labor	**Ralph Willis**	John Kelly (Lib)	Shirley Bold		Lynne Bryer (SWP)
Gippsland	NCP	Graeme McIntyre	**Peter Nixon** (NCP)	Pierre Forcier		Bruce Ingle (Ind)
Henty	Liberal	Joan Child	**Ken Aldred** (Lib)	Jonathan Melland	John Mulholland	
Higgins	Liberal	Jennifer Bundy	**Roger Shipton** (Lib)	James Thornley		Maureen Holmes (IBCP); Wilhelm Kapphan (Ind)
Holt	Liberal	Michael Duffy	**William Yates** (Lib)	Brian Stockton	Michael Rowe	
Hotham	Liberal	Lewis Kent	**Roger Johnston** (Lib)	Robyn Groves	Edward Woods	
Indi	Liberal	Carole Marple	**Ewen Cameron*** (Lib); Allan Garrett (NCP)	Ralph Fleming		Patrick Flanagan (Ind); Brian Lumsden (Ind)
Isaacs	Liberal	David Charles	**Bill Burns** (Lib)	Michael Bakos		Sydney Balhorn (Ind)
Kooyong	Liberal	Wesley Blackmore	**Andrew Peacock** (Lib)	James Lysaght		
Lalor	Labor	**Barry Jones**	Thomas Meskos (Lib)	Ivan Pollock		
La Trobe	Liberal	Peter Milton	**Marshall Baillieu** (Lib)	James Leicester	Desmond Burke	Cornelus Hellema (UCP); Wilhelm Kapphan (Ind)
Mallee	NCP	Geoffrey Ferns	**Peter Fisher*** (NCP); Neville Goodwin (Lib)	Colin Kavanagh		Leslie Connolly (Ind); Ronald Nicholson (Ind)
Maribyrnong	Labor	**Moss Cass**	Geoffrey Ireland (Lib)	Henrik Jersic		
McMillan	Liberal	Barry Cunningham	**Barry Simon** (Lib)	Sandra Burke	Brian Handley	Robert McCracken (Ind)
Melbourne	Labor	**Ted Innes**	Robert Fallshaw (Lib)	Alan Hughes		James Ferrari (IBCP); Max Ogden (CPA)
Melbourne Ports	Labor	**Clyde Holding**	Colin Bell (Lib)	Stephen Duthy		Wilhelm Kapphan (Ind); Gordon Moffatt (Ind)
Murray	NCP	Joan Groves	Bill Hunter (Lib); **Bruce Lloyd*** (NCP)	Douglas Linford		Diane Teasdale (Ind)
Scullin	Labor	**Harry Jenkins**	Geoffrey Lutz (Lib)	Brian Kidd		
Wannon	Liberal	Keith Wilson	**Malcolm Fraser** (Lib)	Bernhard Kruger		Joseph Young (Ind)
Wills	Labor	Bob Hawke	Vincenzo d'Aquino (Lib)	Kenneth Goss	Thomas Stewart	Michael Head (SLL); Philip Herington (CPA); Martin Newell (Ind); Solomon Salby (SWP)

=== Western Australia ===
Electorate	Held by	Labor candidate	Liberal candidate	Democrats candidate	Other candidates
Canning	Liberal	James Hansen	**Mel Bungey**	Theresa Cunningham	Pamela Wells (Ind)
Curtin	Liberal	Richard Grounds	**Victor Garland**	Gary Payne	
Forrest	Liberal	Walter MacMillan	**Peter Drummond**	Alfred Bussell	Francis Timms (NCP)
Fremantle	Labor	**John Dawkins**	Donald McLeod	Graham Hull	Angelo Lopez (SWP)
Kalgoorlie	Liberal	Graeme Campbell	**Mick Cotter**	Trevor Butler	
Moore	Liberal	Allen Blanchard	**John Hyde**	Donald McComish	Gladwin Wood (NCP)
O'Connor	Liberal	Robert Duncannon	Wilson Tuckey	Guy Wroth	Eric Charlton (NPW); Anthony Hassell (NCP)
Perth	Liberal	William Delaney	**Ross McLean**	Robert Foster	June Steen-Olsen (PCP)
Stirling	Liberal	Richard Pitts	**Ian Viner**	Jean Jenkins	Roger Broinowski (Ind)
Swan	Liberal	Kim Beazley	**John Martyr**	Jean Ritter	Stephen Painter (SWP)
Tangney	Liberal	Maureen Wong	**Peter Shack**	Robert McCormack	

== Senate ==
Sitting Senators are shown in bold text. Tickets that elected at least one Senator are highlighted in the relevant colour. Successful candidates are identified by an asterisk (*).

=== Australian Capital Territory ===
Two seats were up for election. The Labor Party was defending one seat. The Liberal Party was defending one seat.

Labor candidates	Liberal candidates	Democrats candidates	JACC candidates	Ungrouped candidates
1. **Susan Ryan***; 2. John Langmore	1. **John Knight***; 2. David Adams	1. John Filler; 2. John Morgan	1. Neville Curtis; 2. Jacqueline Flitcroft	Joseph Marks

=== New South Wales ===
Five seats were up for election. The Labor Party was defending two seats. The Liberal-NCP Coalition was defending three seats. Senators Peter Baume (Liberal), Arthur Gietzelt (Labor), Misha Lajovic (Liberal), Colin Mason (Democrats) and Tony Mulvihill (Labor) were not up for re-election.

Labor candidates	Coalition candidates	Democrats candidates	CTA candidates	Marijuana candidates	Colonialist candidates
1. **Doug McClelland***; 2. Bruce Childs*; 3. **Kerry Sibraa***	1. **John Carrick*** (Lib); 2. **Douglas Scott*** (NCP); 3. **Chris Puplick** (Lib)	1. Paul McLean; 2. Elisabeth Kirkby; 3. Laurence Bourke	1. Fred Nile; 2. John Whitehall; 3. Joan Loew	1. James Billington; 2. Anne Parsons	1. Nicholas Jones; 2. Ian MacRae
Socialist candidates	Progress candidates	Group C candidates	Ungrouped candidates		
1. Peter Symon; 2. Harry Black; 3. Raymond Ferguson; 4. Edgar Woodbury	1. Fernand Eyschen; 2. Nicholas Hudson	1. John E. Champion; 2. Julie A. Champion; 3. John D. Champion	Estelle Myers; Rudolph Dezelin; Norman Eather; Bernard O'Grady	Gene Salvestrin; Joylene Hairmouth; Terence Griffiths; Josephine Chisholm-Mallett	

=== Northern Territory ===
Two seats were up for election. The Labor Party was defending one seat. The Country Liberal Party was defending one seat.

Labor candidates	CLP candidates	Democrats candidates	CDP candidates	Marijuana candidates
1. **Ted Robertson***; 2. Hunter Harrison	1. **Bernie Kilgariff***; 2. Graeme Lewis	1. Jack Hunt; 2. William Evans	1. Ronald Mann; 2. Charles Coombs	1. Jennifer Smether; 2. Lance Lawrence

=== Queensland ===
Five seats were up for election. The Labor Party was defending two seats. The Liberal Party was defending one seat. The National Party of Australia was defending two seats. Senators Stan Collard (National Country), Mal Colston (Labor), George Georges (Labor), David MacGibbon (Liberal) and Kathy Martin (Liberal) were not up for re-election.

Labor candidates	Liberal candidates	NCP candidates	Democrats candidates	Progress candidates	National Front candidates
1. **Jim Keeffe***; 2. Gerry Jones*; 3. Robert Gleeson	1. **Neville Bonner***; 2. Yvonne McComb; 3. Franz Born	1. Florence Bjelke-Petersen*; 2. **Glen Sheil**; 3. **Ron Maunsell**	1. Michael Macklin*; 2. William Elson-Green; 3. Gilruth Rees	1. Vivian Forbes; 2. Frank Paull	1. Rosemary Sisson; 2. Victor Robb
Socialist candidates	Group F candidates	Group G candidates	Group H candidates	Group J candidates	Ungrouped candidates
1. David Ryan; 2. Stephen Bulloch; 3. Ivan Ivanoff	1. John Butler; 2. Anne Glew	1. Sydney Shawcross; 2. Cyril McKenzie; 3. Michael Dendle	1. James Drabsch; 2. Vivien Botterill	1. Lionel Fifield; 2. Robert McClintock	Norman Eather; Neil McKay; Anthony Catip; Frederick Phillips; Carlemo Wacando

=== South Australia ===
Five seats were up for election. The Labor Party was defending two seats. The Liberal Party was defending three seats. Senators Ron Elstob (Labor), Geoff McLaren (Labor), Tony Messner (Liberal), Baden Teague (Liberal) and Harold Young (Liberal) were not up for re-election.

Labor candidates	Liberal candidates	Democrats candidates	NCP candidates	Australia candidates	Socialist candidates
1. Dominic Foreman*; 2. Nick Bolkus*; 3. Graham Maguire	1. **Don Jessop***; 2. Robert Hill*; 3. Craig Spiel	1. Janine Haines*; 2. Ian Gilfillan; 3. David Vigor	1. Geoffrey Clothier; 2. Sylvia Schultz; 3. Peter McBride	1. Ian Modistach; 2. Alan Jamieson	1. Brian Rooney; 2. Ida Goss; 3. Laurence Kiek
Marijuana candidates	CCC candidates	PCP candidates	Ungrouped candidates		
1. Craig Cocks; 2. Gwenda Woods	1. Betty Luks; 2. James Cronin; 3. Gordon Kroschel	1. David Kitto; 2. Mary McKenzie-Huish	Valentine Furner; Raymond Bradtke; William Forster		

=== Tasmania ===
Five seats were up for election. The Labor Party was defending two seats. The Liberal Party was defending two seats. Independent Senator Brian Harradine was defending one seat. Senators Brian Archer (Liberal), Don Grimes (Labor), Michael Tate (Labor), Shirley Walters (Liberal) and John Watson (Liberal) were not up for re-election.

Labor candidates	Liberal candidates	Harradine candidates	Democrats candidates
1. Jean Hearn*; 2. John Coates*; 3. John White	1. **Peter Rae***; 2. **Michael Townley***; 3. Peter Jones	1. **Brian Harradine***; 2. Harry Upston	1. Norman Siberry; 2. Rae Saxon; 3. Brian Austen

=== Victoria ===
Five seats were up for election. The Labor Party was defending two seats. The Liberal Party was defending three seats. Senators John Button (Labor), Don Chipp (Democrats), Gareth Evans (Labor), David Hamer (Liberal) and Alan Missen (Liberal) were not up for re-election.

Labor candidates	Liberal candidates	Democrats candidates	DLP candidates	Australia candidates	Socialist candidates
1. **Cyril Primmer***; 2. Robert Ray*; 3. **Jean Melzer**	1. **Dame Margaret Guilfoyle*** (Lib); 2. **Austin Lewis*** (Lib); 3. **Laurence Neal** (NCP)	1. John Siddons*; 2. Janet Powell; 3. Ian Price	1. Paul McManus; 2. John Flint; 3. Robert Semmel	1. Gail Farrell; 2. Frederick Funnell	1. Georgina Lialios; 2. Trevor McCandless; 3. Raymond Berbling
Marijuana candidates	Group B candidates	Group D candidates	Group E candidates	Group K candidates	Ungrouped candidates
1. Margaret Fraser; 2. James Billington	1. John Jess; 2. John Davies; 3. Donald Moyes	1. George Samargis; 2. Daniel Samargis	1. Shane Watson; 2. Ernest Langmaid	1. Francis Petering; 2. Jean McPherson; 3. Louis Cook	Augustus Titter; Wilhelm Kapphan; Maurice Smith; Pamela Moore; Anthony Palmer

=== Western Australia ===
Five seats were up for election. The Labor Party was defending two seats. The Liberal Party was defending three seats. Senators Fred Chaney (Liberal), Ruth Coleman (Labor), Allan Rocher (Liberal), Andrew Thomas (Liberal) and Peter Walsh (Labor) were not up for re-election.

Labor candidates	Liberal candidates	Democrats candidates	NCP candidates	NPW candidates	Progress candidates
1. **Gordon McIntosh***; 2. Patricia Giles*; 3. Brian Conway	1. **Reg Withers***; 2. **Peter Durack***; 3. Noel Crichton-Browne*	1. Jack Evans; 2. Geoffrey Taylor; 3. Shirley de la Hunty	1. John Patterson; 2. John McIntyre; 3. Leonard Newing	1. Anthony Overheu; 2. Edna Adams; 3. Murray Anderson	1. John Trewick; 2. James Jamieson; 3. Kenneth Law
PCP candidates	Group D candidates	Ungrouped candidates			
1. Syd Negus; 2. Peter Harwood	1. Francesco Nesci; 2. Nellie Stuart	Douglas Thorp			

== Summary by party ==
Beside each party is the number of seats contested by that party in the House of Representatives for each state, as well as an indication of whether the party contested the Senate election in the respective state.

Party	NSW		Vic		Qld		WA		SA		Tas		ACT		NT		Total	
Party	HR	S	HR	S	HR	S	HR	S	HR	S	HR	S	HR	S	HR	S	HR	S
Australian Labor Party	43	*	33	*	19	*	11	*	11	*	5	*	2	*	1	*	125	8
Liberal Party of Australia	36	*	32	*	13	*	11	*	11	*	5	*	2	*			110	7
National Country Party	9	*	4	*	9	*	3	*	4	*							29	5
Country Liberal Party															1	*	1	1
Australian Democrats	43	*	33	*	18	*	11	*	11	*	2	*	2	*	1	*	121	8
Progress Party	6	*			10	*		*									16	3
Democratic Labor Party			12	*													12	1
Socialist Workers Party	4		2		1		2		1								10	
Socialist Labour League	5		1		1				1								8	
Communist Party of Australia	4		2						1								7	
Progressive Conservative Party	1						1	*	3	*							5	2
United Christian Party			2														2	
Imperial British Conservative Party			2														2	
Socialist Party of Australia	1	*		*		*				*							1	4
Australian Marijuana Party		*		*						*					1	*	1	4
Australia Party			1	*						*							1	2
National Party of Western Australia							1	*									1	1
Christian Democrat Party															1	*	1	1
Call to Australia		*																1
National Colonialist Party		*																1
National Front						*												1
Concerned Christian Candidates										*								1
Jobless Action Community Campaign														*				1
Independent and other	15		17		7		2		1		1		3		3		49	

== See also ==
- 1980 Australian federal election
- Members of the Australian House of Representatives, 1977–1980
- Members of the Australian House of Representatives, 1980–1983
- Members of the Australian Senate, 1978–1981
- Members of the Australian Senate, 1981–1983
- List of political parties in Australia
