= Electoral results for the Division of Hotham =

Australian division election results

This is a list of electoral results for the Division of Hotham in Australian federal elections from the division's creation in 1969 until the present.

== Members ==
Member	Party	Term
Don Chipp	Liberal	1969–1977
Don Chipp	Independent	1977–1977
Don Chipp	Democrats	1977–1977
Roger Johnston	Liberal	1977–1980
Lewis Kent	Labor	1980–1990
Simon Crean	Labor	1990–2013
Clare O'Neil	Labor	2013–present

== Election results ==
=== Elections in the 2020s ===
==== 2025 ====
2025 Australian federal election: Hotham
Party	Candidate	Votes	%	±%
Labor	Clare O'Neil	51,880	48.85	+5.74
Liberal	Harmick Singh Matharu	27,346	25.75	−2.81
Greens	Martin Barry	15,780	14.86	+0.21
One Nation	Stuart Fogarty	4,959	4.67	+2.29
Family First	Mark Brown	3,592	3.38	+3.38
Citizens	Tony Vainoras	2,654	2.50	+2.46
Total formal votes		106,211	96.64	+0.19
Informal votes		3,692	3.36	−0.19
Turnout		109,903	92.36	+2.59
Two-party-preferred result
Labor	Clare O'Neil	71,012	66.86	+5.27
Liberal	Harmick Singh Matharu	35,199	33.14	−5.27
Labor hold		Swing	+5.27	

==== 2022 ====
2022 Australian federal election: Hotham
Party	Candidate	Votes	%	±%
Labor	Clare O'Neil	47,135	47.04	−3.72
Liberal	Savitri Bevinakoppa	25,273	25.22	−8.15
Greens	Louisa Willoughby	12,408	12.38	+3.44
Liberal Democrats	Edward Sok	6,591	6.58	+6.58
United Australia	Bruce Ridgway	5,869	5.86	+2.17
One Nation	Roger Tull	2,926	2.92	+2.92
Total formal votes		100,202	96.45	+0.85
Informal votes		3,688	3.55	−0.85
Turnout		103,890	89.58	−2.81
Two-party-preferred result
Labor	Clare O'Neil	64,382	64.25	+3.07
Liberal	Savitri Bevinakoppa	35,820	35.75	−3.07
Labor hold		Swing	+3.07	

Alluvial diagram for preference flows in the seat of Hotham in the 2022 federal election. indicates at what stage the winning candidate had over 50% of the votes and was declared the winner.

=== Elections in the 2010s ===
==== 2019 ====
2019 Australian federal election: Hotham
Party	Candidate	Votes	%	±%
Labor	Clare O'Neil	43,310	45.18	+2.10
Liberal	George Hua	37,447	39.06	−1.28
Greens	Jess Gonsalvez	8,722	9.10	+0.04
United Australia	Jin Luan	3,483	3.63	+3.63
Sustainable Australia	Dennis Bilic	1,772	1.85	+1.85
Rise Up Australia	Peter Dorian	1,134	1.18	−0.41
Total formal votes		95,868	96.21	+0.12
Informal votes		3,780	3.79	−0.12
Turnout		99,648	92.41	−0.89
Two-party-preferred result
Labor	Clare O'Neil	53,597	55.91	+1.70
Liberal	George Hua	42,271	44.09	−1.70
Labor hold		Swing	+1.70	

==== 2016 ====
2016 Australian federal election: Hotham
Party	Candidate	Votes	%	±%
Labor	Clare O'Neil	39,881	45.75	−1.38
Liberal	George Hua	32,512	37.30	+0.16
Greens	James Bennett	8,042	9.23	+0.71
Animal Justice	Helen Jeges	2,593	2.97	+2.97
Family First	Tatiana Rathbone	2,106	2.42	+0.31
Rise Up Australia	Peter Vassiliou	2,030	2.33	+0.71
Total formal votes		87,164	96.13	+0.96
Informal votes		3,511	3.87	−0.96
Turnout		90,675	90.68	−1.85
Two-party-preferred result
Labor	Clare O'Neil	50,104	57.48	+0.21
Liberal	George Hua	37,060	42.52	−0.21
Labor hold		Swing	+0.21	

==== 2013 ====
2013 Australian federal election: Hotham
Party	Candidate	Votes	%	±%
Labor	Clare O'Neil	40,512	47.13	−7.22
Liberal	Fazal Cader	31,929	37.14	+4.79
Greens	Lorna Wyatt	7,327	8.52	−1.64
Palmer United	Samuel Porter	2,981	3.47	+3.47
Family First	Stephen Nowland	1,818	2.11	−0.25
Rise Up Australia	Peter Vassiliou	1,392	1.62	+1.62
Total formal votes		85,959	95.17	−0.35
Informal votes		4,365	4.83	+0.35
Turnout		90,324	92.53	−0.56
Two-party-preferred result
Labor	Clare O'Neil	49,232	57.27	−6.69
Liberal	Fazal Cader	36,727	42.73	+6.69
Labor hold		Swing	−6.69	

==== 2010 ====
2010 Australian federal election: Hotham
Party	Candidate	Votes	%	±%
Labor	Simon Crean	42,920	54.08	−1.07
Liberal	Fazal Cader	26,110	32.90	−0.85
Greens	Geoff Payne	8,086	10.19	+3.34
Family First	Gary Ong	1,688	2.13	+0.09
Secular	Trent Reardon	556	0.70	+0.70
Total formal votes		79,360	95.56	−1.14
Informal votes		3,684	4.44	+1.14
Turnout		83,044	92.70	−2.09
Two-party-preferred result
Labor	Simon Crean	50,394	63.50	+0.50
Liberal	Fazal Cader	28,966	36.50	−0.50
Labor hold		Swing	+0.50	

=== Elections in the 2000s ===
==== 2007 ====
2007 Australian federal election: Hotham
Party	Candidate	Votes	%	±%
Labor	Simon Crean	44,853	55.15	+3.93
Liberal	Vince Arborea	27,451	33.75	−5.22
Greens	Matthew Billman	5,572	6.85	+1.46
Family First	Peter Dorian	1,657	2.04	−0.53
Democrats	Craig Cadby	800	0.98	−0.25
Democratic Labor	Terry Farrell	758	0.93	+0.93
Citizens Electoral Council	Mike Woodward	240	0.30	+0.02
Total formal votes		81,331	96.70	+0.94
Informal votes		2,772	3.30	−0.94
Turnout		84,103	94.85	+0.30
Two-party-preferred result
Labor	Simon Crean	51,240	63.00	+5.60
Liberal	Vince Arborea	30,091	37.00	−5.60
Labor hold		Swing	+5.60	

==== 2004 ====
2004 Australian federal election: Hotham
Party	Candidate	Votes	%	±%
Labor	Simon Crean	40,735	51.22	−3.19
Liberal	Jennifer Marriner	30,992	38.97	+3.87
Greens	Kiera Perrott	4,287	5.39	+1.04
Family First	Roger Coombe	2,045	2.57	+2.57
Democrats	Jessica Joss	975	1.23	−4.16
Socialist Alliance	Josephine Cox	274	0.34	+0.34
Citizens Electoral Council	Adam Ellery	224	0.28	−0.45
Total formal votes		79,532	95.76	−0.68
Informal votes		3,525	4.24	+0.68
Turnout		83,057	94.55	−0.27
Two-party-preferred result
Labor	Simon Crean	45,655	57.40	−3.59
Liberal	Jennifer Marriner	33,877	42.60	+3.59
Labor hold		Swing	−3.59	

==== 2001 ====
2001 Australian federal election: Hotham
Party	Candidate	Votes	%	±%
Labor	Simon Crean	44,351	54.45	−2.53
Liberal	Priscilla Ruffolo	28,579	35.09	+2.88
Democrats	Jessica Joss	4,383	5.38	+0.78
Greens	Ollie Bennett	3,544	4.35	+2.51
Citizens Electoral Council	Simon Hall	598	0.73	+0.73
Total formal votes		81,455	96.44	+0.08
Informal votes		3,005	3.56	−0.08
Turnout		84,460	95.08	
Two-party-preferred result
Labor	Simon Crean	49,701	61.01	−2.58
Liberal	Priscilla Ruffolo	31,754	38.99	+2.58
Labor hold		Swing	−2.58	

=== Elections in the 1990s ===
==== 1998 ====
1998 Australian federal election: Hotham
Party	Candidate	Votes	%	±%
Labor	Simon Crean	46,107	56.98	+1.95
Liberal	John Pesutto	26,059	32.21	−3.71
Democrats	Polly Morgan	3,720	4.60	−0.72
One Nation	Alan Salter	2,559	3.16	+3.16
Greens	Susan Walters	1,492	1.84	−0.04
Unity	Stan Rosenthal	841	1.04	+1.04
Natural Law	John Cordon	137	0.17	−0.21
Total formal votes		80,915	96.36	−0.66
Informal votes		3,058	3.64	+0.66
Turnout		83,973	95.29	−0.56
Two-party-preferred result
Labor	Simon Crean	51,451	63.59	+3.03
Liberal	John Pesutto	29,464	36.41	−3.03
Labor hold		Swing	+3.03	

==== 1996 ====
1996 Australian federal election: Hotham
Party	Candidate	Votes	%	±%
Labor	Simon Crean	44,182	55.04	+0.65
Liberal	Brad Maunsell	28,834	35.92	−3.64
Democrats	Brad Starkie	4,271	5.32	+1.98
Greens	Emma Rush	1,511	1.88	+1.88
AAFI	John Casley	1,176	1.46	+1.46
Natural Law	John Cordon	303	0.38	−0.75
Total formal votes		80,277	97.02	+0.02
Informal votes		2,468	2.98	−0.02
Turnout		82,745	95.85	−0.35
Two-party-preferred result
Labor	Simon Crean	48,437	60.56	+1.43
Liberal	Brad Maunsell	31,546	39.44	−1.43
Labor hold		Swing	+1.43	

==== 1993 ====
1993 Australian federal election: Hotham
Party	Candidate	Votes	%	±%
Labor	Simon Crean	42,514	59.30	+15.20
Liberal	Robert Hicks	25,308	35.30	+0.90
Democrats	Giancarlo Squillacciotti	1,743	2.43	−8.59
	Sue Phillips	876	1.22	+1.22
	Petar Pjesivac	765	1.07	+1.07
Natural Law	Gabrielle De Wan	482	0.67	+0.67
Total formal votes		71,688	96.74	+1.58
Informal votes		2,419	3.26	−1.58
Turnout		74,107	96.20	
Two-party-preferred result
Labor	Simon Crean	45,119	62.99	+8.78
Liberal	Robert Hicks	26,511	37.01	−8.78
Labor hold		Swing	+8.78	

==== 1990 ====
1990 Australian federal election: Hotham
Party	Candidate	Votes	%	±%
Labor	Simon Crean	29,570	44.1	−10.5
Liberal	Erdem Aydin	24,278	36.2	−2.2
Democrats	Phillip Anderson	7,388	11.0	+4.0
Independent	Vincent Alfonso	3,025	4.5	+4.5
Call to Australia	Daryl Esmore	1,874	2.8	+2.8
Socialist	Peter Stamatopoulos	918	1.4	+1.4
Total formal votes		67,053	95.2	
Informal votes		3,410	4.8	
Turnout		70,463	95.3	
Two-party-preferred result
Labor	Simon Crean	36,309	54.2	−4.5
Liberal	Erdem Aydin	30,668	45.8	+4.5
Labor hold		Swing	−4.5	

=== Elections in the 1980s ===
==== 1987 ====
1987 Australian federal election: Hotham
Party	Candidate	Votes	%	±%
Labor	Lewis Kent	33,035	52.5	−1.0
Liberal	Peter McCall	25,432	40.5	+5.6
Democrats	Len de Koning	4,402	7.0	−1.5
Total formal votes		62,869	93.3	
Informal votes		4,543	6.7	
Turnout		67,412	95.5	
Two-party-preferred result
Labor	Lewis Kent	35,535	56.5	−1.6
Liberal	Peter McCall	27,328	43.5	+1.6
Labor hold		Swing	−1.6	

==== 1984 ====
1984 Australian federal election: Hotham
Party	Candidate	Votes	%	±%
Labor	Lewis Kent	31,821	53.5	−4.4
Liberal	Michael Heffernan	20,736	34.9	−1.1
Democrats	Greg Chipp	5,028	8.5	+2.4
Democratic Labor	Edward Woods	1,845	3.1	+3.1
Total formal votes		59,430	90.1	
Informal votes		6,505	9.9	
Turnout		65,935	95.4	
Two-party-preferred result
Labor	Lewis Kent	34,551	58.2	−3.5
Liberal	Michael Heffernan	24,865	41.8	+3.5
Labor hold		Swing	−3.5	

==== 1983 ====
1983 Australian federal election: Hotham
Party	Candidate	Votes	%	±%
Labor	Lewis Kent	43,083	56.4	+7.9
Liberal	Peter Bolitho	28,656	37.5	−1.2
Democrats	Erwin Frenkel	4,683	6.1	−5.1
Total formal votes		76,422	97.6	
Informal votes		1,850	2.4	
Turnout		78,272	96.5	
Two-party-preferred result
Labor	Lewis Kent		60.1	+6.1
Liberal	Peter Bolitho		39.9	−6.1
Labor hold		Swing	+6.1	

==== 1980 ====
1980 Australian federal election: Hotham
Party	Candidate	Votes	%	±%
Labor	Lewis Kent	35,201	48.5	+10.4
Liberal	Roger Johnston	28,054	38.7	−1.7
Democrats	Robyn Groves	8,138	11.2	−7.2
Democratic Labor	Edward Woods	1,128	1.6	−1.5
Total formal votes		72,521	97.0	
Informal votes		2,250	3.0	
Turnout		74,771	95.9	
Two-party-preferred result
Labor	Lewis Kent	39,177	54.0	+5.7
Liberal	Roger Johnston	33,344	46.0	−5.7
Labor gain from Liberal		Swing	+5.7	

=== Elections in the 1970s ===
==== 1977 ====
1977 Australian federal election: Hotham
Party	Candidate	Votes	%	±%
Liberal	Roger Johnston	27,663	40.4	−11.7
Labor	Tony Ross	26,144	38.1	−5.6
Democrats	Kenneth Weaver	12,587	18.4	+18.4
Democratic Labor	Edward Woods	2,153	3.1	−0.2
Total formal votes		68,547	97.0	
Informal votes		2,099	3.0	
Turnout		70,646	95.8	
Two-party-preferred result
Liberal	Roger Johnston	35,450	51.7	−3.8
Labor	Tony Ross	33,097	48.3	+3.8
Liberal hold		Swing	−3.8	

==== 1975 ====
1975 Australian federal election: Hotham
Party	Candidate	Votes	%	±%
Liberal	Don Chipp	32,278	54.3	+6.1
Labor	Tony Ross	24,623	41.5	−4.9
Democratic Labor	Frank Gaffy	1,948	3.3	−0.4
Independent	John Murray	555	0.9	+0.6
Total formal votes		59,404	98.4	
Informal votes		2979	1.6	
Turnout		60,383	95.9	
Two-party-preferred result
Liberal	Don Chipp		57.7	+5.4
Labor	Tony Ross		42.3	−5.4
Liberal hold		Swing	+5.4	

==== 1974 ====
1974 Australian federal election: Hotham
Party	Candidate	Votes	%	±%
Liberal	Don Chipp	27,826	48.2	+0.1
Labor	Tony Ross	26,822	46.4	+4.9
Democratic Labor	Frank Gaffy	2,163	3.7	−4.3
Australia	Richard Franklin	801	1.4	+1.4
Republican	John Murray	177	0.3	−0.5
Total formal votes		57,789	98.1	
Informal votes		1,118	1.9	
Turnout		58,907	96.5	
Two-party-preferred result
Liberal	Don Chipp	30,235	52.3	−4.8
Labor	Tony Ross	27,554	47.7	+4.8
Liberal hold		Swing	−4.8	

==== 1972 ====
1972 Australian federal election: Hotham
Party	Candidate	Votes	%	±%
Liberal	Don Chipp	25,242	48.1	−0.1
Labor	Barry Johnston	21,796	41.5	+1.5
Democratic Labor	Henry Beven	4,211	8.0	−1.3
Independent	Ian Kenner	846	1.6	+1.6
Independent	John Murray	418	0.8	+0.8
Total formal votes		52,513	97.3	
Informal votes		1,453	2.7	
Turnout		53,966	96.1	
Two-party-preferred result
Liberal	Don Chipp	30,003	57.1	−1.1
Labor	Barry Johnston	22,510	42.9	+1.1
Liberal hold		Swing	−1.1	

=== Elections in the 1960s ===
==== 1969 ====
1969 Australian federal election: Hotham
Party	Candidate	Votes	%	±%
Liberal	Don Chipp	23,776	48.2	−0.2
Labor	Kevin Vaughan	19,717	40.0	+5.5
Democratic Labor	Ian Radnell	4,563	9.3	−0.5
Australia	Kenneth Nolan	1,238	2.5	+2.5
Total formal votes		49,294	97.3	
Informal votes		1,379	2.7	
Turnout		50,673	96.3	
Two-party-preferred result
Liberal	Don Chipp	28,667	58.2	−2.6
Labor	Keith Vaughan	20,627	41.8	+2.6
Liberal notional hold		Swing	−2.6	
