= Electoral results for the Division of Higinbotham =

Australian federal election results

This is a list of electoral results for the Division of Higinbotham in Australian federal elections from the division's creation in 1949 until its abolition in 1969.

== Members ==
Member	Party	Term
Frank Timson	Liberal	1949–1960
Don Chipp	Liberal	1960–1969

== Election results ==
=== Elections in the 1960s ===
==== 1966 ====
1966 Australian federal election: Higinbotham
Party	Candidate	Votes	%	±%
Liberal	Don Chipp	30,497	51.3	−0.4
Labor	Reginald Butler	18,667	31.4	−6.8
Democratic Labor	William Cameron	5,463	9.2	−0.9
Liberal Reform Group	John Little	3,251	5.5	+5.5
Republican	John A'Murray	1,561	2.6	+2.6
Total formal votes		59,439	96.9	
Informal votes		1,879	3.1	
Turnout		61,318	96.0	
Two-party-preferred result
Liberal	Don Chipp		61.8	+1.0
Labor	Reginald Butler		38.2	−1.0
Liberal hold		Swing	+1.0	

==== 1963 ====
1963 Australian federal election: Higinbotham
Party	Candidate	Votes	%	±%
Liberal	Don Chipp	30,406	51.7	+8.0
Labor	Reginald Butler	22,457	38.2	−2.8
Democratic Labor	William Cameron	5,965	10.1	−5.2
Total formal votes		58,828	99.2	
Informal votes		481	0.8	
Turnout		59,309	97.0	
Two-party-preferred result
Liberal	Don Chipp		60.8	+3.0
Labor	Reginald Butler		39.2	−3.0
Liberal hold		Swing	+3.0	

==== 1961 ====
1961 Australian federal election: Higinbotham
Party	Candidate	Votes	%	±%
Liberal	Don Chipp	24,525	43.7	−5.8
Labor	Henry Fowler	22,991	41.0	+1.8
Democratic Labor	William Cameron	8,588	15.3	+4.0
Total formal votes		56,104	98.6	
Informal votes		796	1.4	
Turnout		56,900	96.9	
Two-party-preferred result
Liberal	Don Chipp	32,453	57.8	−2.0
Labor	Henry Fowler	23,651	42.2	+2.0
Liberal hold		Swing	−2.0	

==== 1960 by-election ====
1960 Higinbotham by-election
Party	Candidate	Votes	%	±%
Labor	Henry Fowler	23,541	46.8	+7.6
Liberal	Don Chipp	19,661	39.1	−10.4
Democratic Labor	James Nugent	6,756	13.4	−2.1
Republican	Edward McBride	325	0.6	+0.6
Total formal votes		50,283	98.1	
Informal votes		993	1.9	
Turnout		51,276	90.7	
Two-party-preferred result
Liberal	Don Chipp	25,443	50.6	−9.2
Labor	Henry Fowler	24,840	49.4	+9.2
Liberal hold		Swing	−9.2	

Frank Timson (Liberal) died.

=== Elections in the 1950s ===
==== 1958 ====
1958 Australian federal election: Higinbotham
Party	Candidate	Votes	%	±%
Liberal	Frank Timson	24,770	49.5	−1.3
Labor	Edwin Lamb	19,600	39.2	+0.0
Democratic Labor	Desmond Ward	5,665	11.3	+1.3
Total formal votes		50,035	98.0	
Informal votes		1,003	2.0	
Turnout		51,038	96.2	
Two-party-preferred result
Liberal	Frank Timson	29,920	59.8	+1.0
Labor	Edwin Lamb	20,115	40.2	−1.0
Liberal hold		Swing	+1.0	

==== 1955 ====
1955 Australian federal election: Higinbotham
Party	Candidate	Votes	%	±%
Liberal	Frank Timson	21,251	50.8	−3.2
Labor	Les Coates	16,419	39.2	−6.8
Labor (A-C)	Frank Gaffy	4,176	10.0	+10.0
Total formal votes		41,846	97.7	
Informal votes		968	2.3	
Turnout		42,814	95.1	
Two-party-preferred result
Liberal	Frank Timson		58.8	+4.8
Labor	Les Coates		41.2	−4.8
Liberal hold		Swing	+4.8	

==== 1954 ====
1954 Australian federal election: Higinbotham
Party	Candidate	Votes	%	±%
Liberal	Frank Timson	30,579	54.5	+0.1
Labor	Geoffrey Sowerbutts	25,537	45.5	−0.1
Total formal votes		56,116	99.0	
Informal votes		584	1.0	
Turnout		56,700	96.4	
Liberal hold		Swing	+0.1	

==== 1951 ====
1951 Australian federal election: Higinbotham
Party	Candidate	Votes	%	±%
Liberal	Frank Timson	25,493	54.4	+0.8
Labor	Geoffrey Sowerbutts	21,368	45.6	−0.8
Total formal votes		46,861	98.6	
Informal votes		644	1.4	
Turnout		47,505	96.4	
Liberal hold		Swing	+0.8	

=== Elections in the 1940s ===
==== 1949 ====
1949 Australian federal election: Higinbotham
Party	Candidate	Votes	%	±%
Liberal	Frank Timson	22,832	53.6	+1.2
Labor	Frank Field	19,760	46.4	−1.2
Total formal votes		42,592	98.8	
Informal votes		512	1.2	
Turnout		43,104	96.4	
Liberal notional hold		Swing	+1.2	
