= 1960 Higinbotham by-election =

A by-election was held for the Australian House of Representatives seat of Higinbotham on 10 December 1960. This was triggered by the death of Frank Timson (Liberal).

The by-election was won, though narrowly, by Liberal candidate Don Chipp.

== Results ==
1960 Higinbotham by-election
| Party | Candidate | Votes | % | ±% |
|---|---|---|---|---|
| Labor | Henry Fowler | 23,541 | 46.8 | +7.6 |
| Liberal | Don Chipp | 19,661 | 39.1 | −10.4 |
| Democratic Labor | James Nugent | 6,756 | 13.4 | −2.1 |
| Republican | Edward McBride | 325 | 0.6 | +0.6 |
| Total formal votes | | 50,283 | 98.1 | |
| Informal votes | | 993 | 1.9 | |
| Turnout | | 51,276 | 90.7 | |
Two-party-preferred result
| Liberal | Don Chipp | 25,443 | 50.6 | −9.2 |
| Labor | Henry Fowler | 24,840 | 49.4 | +9.2 |
| Liberal hold | | Swing | −9.2 | |
