= Electoral results for the district of Sherwood =

Queensland state electoral results

This is a list of electoral results for the electoral district of Sherwood in Queensland state elections.

== Members for Sherwood ==
Member	Party	Term
Tom Kerr	Liberal	1950–1956
John Herbert	Liberal	1956–1978
Angus Innes	Liberal	1978–1990
David Dunworth	Liberal	1990–1992

== Election results ==
=== Elections in the 1990s ===
1990 Sherwood state by-election
Party	Candidate	Votes	%	±%
Liberal	David Dunworth	8,858	50.2	−3.7
Independent Labor	Peter Pyke	7,114	40.3	+40.3
Democrats	Gilruth Rees	1,151	6.5	+6.5
Grey Power	Bernard Appel	393	2.2	+2.2
Independent	Anthony Vestey	126	0.7	+0.7
Total formal votes		17,642	96.8	+0.2
Informal votes		573	3.2	−0.2
Turnout		18,215	80.3	−11.4
Liberal hold		Swing	N/A	

- Preferences were not distributed.

=== Elections in the 1980s ===
1989 Queensland state election: Sherwood
Party	Candidate	Votes	%	±%
Liberal	Angus Innes	10,837	53.9	−13.8
Labor	Peter Pyke	9,282	46.1	+13.8
Total formal votes		20,119	96.6	+0.3
Informal votes		713	3.4	−0.3
Turnout		20,832	91.7	−0.4
Liberal hold		Swing	−13.8	

1986 Queensland state election: Sherwood
Party	Candidate	Votes	%	±%
Liberal	Angus Innes	12,323	67.7	+27.6
Labor	Peter Rowe	5,868	32.3	+0.7
Total formal votes		18,191	96.3	
Informal votes		692	3.7	
Turnout		18,883	92.1	
Liberal hold		Swing	+4.3	

1983 Queensland state election: Sherwood
Party	Candidate	Votes	%	±%
Liberal	Angus Innes	7,267	40.1	−14.6
Labor	John Court	5,727	31.6	+5.0
National	Christopher Stephens	4,585	25.3	+8.5
Independent	Cedric Holland	546	3.0	+3.0
Total formal votes		18,125	98.9	0.0
Informal votes		194	1.1	0.0
Turnout		18,319	93.2	+3.5
Two-party-preferred result
Liberal	Angus Innes	12,087	66.7	−4.2
Labor	John Court	6,038	33.3	+4.2
Liberal hold		Swing	−4.2	

1980 Queensland state election: Sherwood
Party	Candidate	Votes	%	±%
Liberal	Angus Innes	9,004	54.7	−3.9
Labor	Peter Doyle	4,384	26.6	−8.6
National	Terrence Mahoney	2,762	16.8	+16.8
Progress	Judith Forbes	320	1.9	−4.2
Total formal votes		16,470	98.9	0.0
Informal votes		178	1.1	0.0
Turnout		16,648	89.7	−2.5
Two-party-preferred result
Liberal	Angus Innes	11,678	70.9	+8.0
Labor	Peter Doyle	4,792	29.1	−8.0
Liberal hold		Swing	+8.0	

=== Elections in the 1970s ===
1978 Sherwood state by-election
Party	Candidate	Votes	%	±%
Liberal	Angus Innes	6,269	42.2	−16.4
Labor	Michael Kinnane	4,755	32.0	−3.2
Democrats	Stanley Stanley	1,774	11.9	+11.9
National	Desmond Draydon	1,527	10.3	+10.3
Progress	Judith Forbes	290	2.0	−4.1
Independent	Charles Connelly	134	0.9	+0.9
Communist	Murray Broad	73	0.5	+0.5
National Front	Victor Robb	35	0.2	+0.2
Total formal votes		14,857	98.2	−0.7
Informal votes		278	1.8	+0.7
Turnout		15,135	88.2	−4.0
After distribution of preferences
Liberal	Angus Innes	8,012	53.9	
Labor	Michael Kinnane	4,889	32.9	
Democrats	Stanley Stanley	1,956	13.2	
Liberal hold		Swing	N/A	

- Preferences were not distributed to completion.

1977 Queensland state election: Sherwood
Party	Candidate	Votes	%	±%
Liberal	John Herbert	8,804	58.6	−11.1
Labor	Michael Kinnane	5,291	35.2	+8.5
Progress	Judith Forbes	919	6.1	+6.1
Total formal votes		15,014	98.9	
Informal votes		161	1.1	
Turnout		15,175	92.2	
Two-party-preferred result
Liberal	John Herbert	9,447	62.9	−11.1
Labor	Michael Kinnane	5,567	37.1	+11.1
Liberal hold		Swing	−11.1	

1974 Queensland state election: Sherwood
Party	Candidate	Votes	%	±%
Liberal	John Herbert	10,898	69.7	+16.1
Labor	Kerry Keating	4,171	26.7	−12.2
Queensland Labor	Clarice Weedon	566	3.6	−3.9
Total formal votes		15,635	98.6	+0.3
Informal votes		219	1.4	−0.3
Turnout		15,854	90.6	−2.8
Two-party-preferred result
Liberal	John Herbert	11,368	72.7	+12.9
Labor	Kerry Keating	4,267	27.3	−12.9
Liberal hold		Swing	+12.9	

1972 Queensland state election: Sherwood
Party	Candidate	Votes	%	±%
Liberal	John Herbert	6,817	53.6	−3.7
Labor	Kerry Keating	4,947	38.9	+3.9
Queensland Labor	Clarice Weedon	960	7.5	−0.2
Total formal votes		12,724	98.3	
Informal votes		217	1.7	
Turnout		12,941	93.4	
Two-party-preferred result
Liberal	John Herbert	7,615	59.8	−6.4
Labor	Kerry Keating	5,109	40.2	+6.4
Liberal hold		Swing	−6.4	

=== Elections in the 1960s ===
1969 Queensland state election: Sherwood
Party	Candidate	Votes	%	±%
Liberal	John Herbert	7,951	57.3	−9.3
Labor	Robert Wilson	4,855	35.0	+1.6
Queensland Labor	Clarice Weedon	1,072	7.7	+7.7
Total formal votes		13,878	98.1	−0.3
Informal votes		271	1.9	+0.3
Turnout		14,149	92.5	−0.9
Two-party-preferred result
Liberal	John Herbert	8,824	63.6	−3.0
Labor	Robert Wilson	5,054	36.4	+3.0
Liberal hold		Swing	−3.0	

1966 Queensland state election: Sherwood
Party	Candidate	Votes	%	±%
Liberal	John Herbert	8,430	66.6	+5.9
Labor	Gilbert Thorsen	4,233	33.4	+0.3
Total formal votes		12,663	98.4	+0.3
Informal votes		210	1.6	−0.3
Turnout		12,873	93.4	−1.8
Liberal hold		Swing	+0.6	

1963 Queensland state election: Sherwood
Party	Candidate	Votes	%	±%
Liberal	John Herbert	7,083	60.7	−2.2
Labor	Vincent Kitson	3,855	33.1	−4.0
Queensland Labor	Len Galligan	723	6.2	+6.2
Total formal votes		11,631	98.1	−0.4
Informal votes		231	1.9	+0.4
Turnout		11,892	95.2	+1.4
Two-party-preferred result
Liberal	John Herbert	7,692	66.0	+3.1
Labor	Vincent Kitson	3,969	34.0	−3.1
Liberal hold		Swing	+3.1	

1960 Queensland state election: Sherwood
Party	Candidate	Votes	%	±%
Liberal	John Herbert	7,107	62.9	
Labor	Gordon Thomson	4,190	37.1	
Total formal votes		11,297	98.5	
Informal votes		173	1.5	
Turnout		11,470	93.8	
Liberal hold		Swing		

=== Elections in the 1950s ===
1957 Queensland state election: Sherwood
Party	Candidate	Votes	%	±%
Liberal	John Herbert	8,934	49.3	−1.8
Labor	Doug Sherrington	5,810	32.1	−13.1
Queensland Labor	Harry Wright	3,381	18.7	+18.7
Total formal votes		18,125	98.9	+1.9
Informal votes		198	1.1	−1.9
Turnout		18,323	94.4	+0.5
Liberal hold		Swing	+7.6	

1956 Queensland state election: Sherwood
Party	Candidate	Votes	%	±%
Liberal	John Herbert	8,384	51.1	+0.6
Labor	Bart Lourigan	7,424	45.2	−3.5
Independent	Margaret Fisher	400	2.4	+2.4
Communist	Eugene Marshall	206	1.3	+1.3
Total formal votes		16,414	97.0	−1.8
Informal votes		500	3.0	+1.8
Turnout		16,914	93.9	−0.3
Liberal hold		Swing	+2.0	

1953 Queensland state election: Sherwood
Party	Candidate	Votes	%	±%
Liberal	Tom Kerr	6,830	50.5	−7.9
Labor	Robert Mansfield	6,552	48.5	+6.9
Independent	Pablo O'Dowd	141	1.0	+1.0
Total formal votes		13,523	98.8	−0.4
Informal votes		169	1.2	+0.4
Turnout		13,692	94.2	+0.8
Liberal hold		Swing	−7.4	

1950 Queensland state election: Sherwood
Party	Candidate	Votes	%	±%
Liberal	Tom Kerr	6,765	58.4	
Labor	Robert Mansfield	4,813	41.6	
Total formal votes		11,578	99.2	
Informal votes		96	0.8	
Turnout		11,674	93.4	
Liberal hold		Swing		
