= Australian National Alliance =

Australian political party

The Australian National Alliance (ANA) was a far-right political party active in Australia from 1978 to 1981. Founded in January 1978, it was one of Australia's earliest anti-Asian immigration parties. The ANA contested the 1979 Grayndler by-election, in which its secretary and candidate Frank Salter received 863 votes (1.64%).

In 1981 the ANA merged with the Immigration Control Association and the Progressive Conservative Party to form the Progressive Nationalist Party, which claimed a membership of 1,000.

== See also ==
- Far-right politics in Australia
