= National Front of Australia =

Far-right Australian political party, 1977–1984

The National Front of Australia (NFA) was an Australia nationalist and anti-immigrant organisation that existed from 1977 to 1984. It was an initiative of John Tyndall of the British National Front but received no funding from the British NF.

== History ==
The NFA was established originally in 1977 as a sister organisation of the British National Front; sister organisations were also formed in New Zealand and South Africa at the same time. It did not become fully operative until 1978.

NFA followed Tyndall's British imperial view and called for a “regenerated British Australia”. Like the sister organisations, it sought to align itself with other right-wing and racist groups. However, its British Australian nationalism and anti-immigrant stance separated it from the more Europeanist/Americanist 'white race' neo-Nazi far-right that was emerging in Australia, many of whose members were themselves immigrants rather than of British origin.

The first party chairman was Rosemary Sisson. Branches were formed in Victoria, with Sisson as branch secretary; in Queensland, with Victor Robb as branch secretary; and in New South Wales with neo-Nazi Robert Cameron as branch secretary. Divisions emerged between the Victoria and New South Wales branches. Cameron was later joined by fellow neo-Nazi Ross "the skull" May during the 1980s. Cameron was accused of being an "informer-provocateur" and that his presence discredited the party as a 'respectable' right-wing party.

From June 1978 the party published a magazine called Frontline, in collaboration with the New Zealand National Front.

Victor Robb was the party's first electoral candidate in 1978. He "campaigned at the time on a platform of making Australia racially pure". Sisson and Robb stood for the party in the 1980 federal election in Queensland.

Sisson attended the British National Front's AGM in 1978. Following John Tyndall's departure from the British National Front in 1980, the NFA supported the New National Front.

The party ceased in 1984. After the demise of the party Frontline continued to March 1987 in support of a more general non-party "nationalist cause".

== Federal parliament ==
Senate
| Election year | # of overall votes | % of overall vote | # of overall seats won | # of overall seats | +/– | Notes |
| 1980 | 1,467 | 0.01 (#12/12) | 0 / 40 | 0 / 76 | ▲0 | |

== See also ==
- British National Front
- New Zealand National Front
- South African National Front
