= Progressive Nationalist Party =

Australian far-right political party

The Progressive Nationalist Party (PNP) was a short-lived Australian far-right political party. It was formed in 1981 as a merger between the Australian National Alliance, Immigration Control Association and the Progressive Conservative Party. In 1982 it was folded and the National Action was formed in its place. PNP was Strasserist in its ideology. It claimed a membership of 1,000.

== See also ==
- Far-right politics in Australia
