= Division of Higinbotham =

Former Australian federal electoral division

Higinbotham Australian House of Representatives Division
- Created: 1949
- Abolished: 1969
- Namesake: George Higinbotham

The Division of Higinbotham was an Australian Electoral Division in Victoria. The seat was created in 1949 and abolished in 1969, when it was renamed Hotham. It was named for George Higinbotham, a leading Victorian colonial politician and judge.

It was located in the south-eastern suburbs of Melbourne, including Bentleigh, Highett, Moorabbin and Sandringham. It was a fairly safe seat for the Liberal Party.

== Members ==
Image	Member	Party	Term	Notes
	Frank Timson (1909–1960)	Liberal	10 December 1949 – 16 October 1960	Died in office
	Don Chipp (1925–2006)	Liberal	10 December 1960 – 25 October 1969	Served as minister under Holt, McEwen and Gorton. Transferred to the newly created Division of Hotham after Higinbotham was abolished in 1969
