= Progressive Conservative Party (Australia) =

- Leader: Gordon Hardy
- Founded: October 1979
- Merged into: Progressive Nationalist Party
- Headquarters: Perth, Western Australia
- Ideology: White nationalism Anti-immigration
- Political position: Far-right

The Progressive Conservative Party (PCP) was a far-right Australian political party that contested the 1980 federal election. Its stated aims included the reintroduction of the White Australia Policy, an end to Asian immigration to Australia, the cessation of foreign aid, and higher tax concessions to non-working mothers. Its candidates included the former independent Western Australian senator, Syd Negus.

The party was established in October 1979 by Gordon Hardy, a Perth company director. Its policies were listed by The Canberra Times as advocating for a national referendum on Asian immigration to Australia, and a 90 percent cut to foreign aid.

In 1981, the PCP merged with the Australian National Alliance and the Immigration Control Association to form the Progressive Nationalist Party, which claimed a membership of 1,000.

== Federal parliament ==
House of Representatives					
Election year	# of overall votes	% of overall vote	# of overall seats won	+/–	Notes
1980	3,620	0.04	0 / 150	▲0	

Senate
Election year	# of overall votes	% of overall vote	# of overall seats won	# of overall seats	+/–	Notes
1980	6,247	0.07	0 / 40	0 / 76	▲0	
