= 1980 Australian federal election =

- 18 October 1980

All 125 seats in the House of Representatives 63 seats were needed for a majority in the House 34 (of the 64) seats in the Senate
- Registered: 9,023,592 ▲5.55%
- Turnout: 8,513,992 (94.35%) (▼0.73 pp)
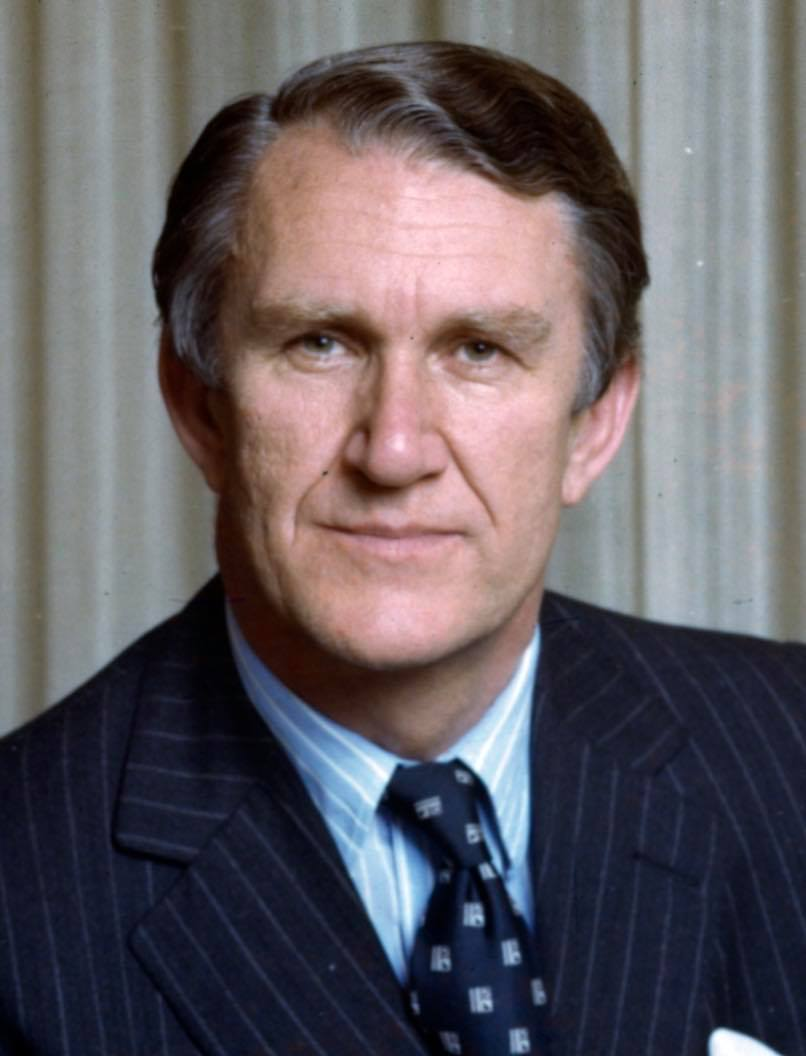

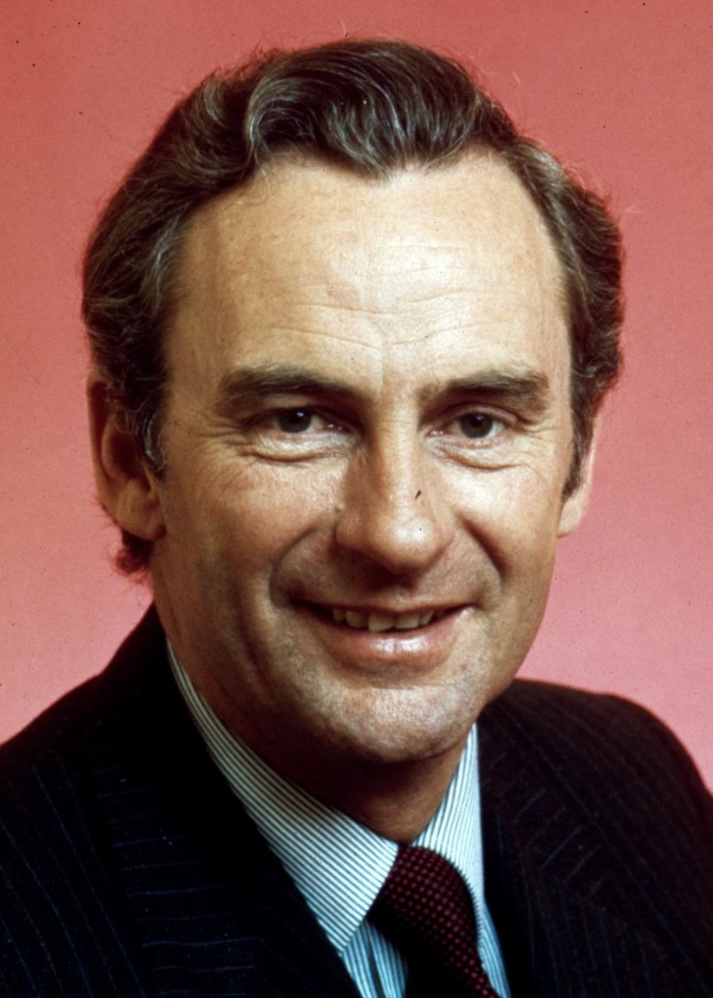
	First party	Second party
Leader	Malcolm Fraser	Bill Hayden
Party	Liberal–National Country Coalition	Labor
Leader since	21 March 1975	22 December 1977
Leader's seat	Wannon (Vic.)	Oxley (Qld.)
Last election	86 seats	38 seats
Seats won	74 seats	51 seats
Seat change	▼12	▲13
Primary vote	3,853,585	3,749,565
Percentage	46.40%	45.15%
Swing	▼1.71	▲5.50
TPP	50.40%	49.60%
TPP swing	▼4.20	▲4.20
- Results by division for the House of Representatives, shaded by winning party's margin of victory.
Prime Minister before election
Malcolm Fraser
Liberal–NCP coalition
Subsequent Prime Minister
Malcolm Fraser
Liberal–NCP Coalition

A federal election was held in Australia on 18 October 1980. All 125 seats in the House of Representatives and 34 of the 64 seats in the Senate were up for election. The incumbent Liberal–NCP coalition government, led by Prime Minister Malcolm Fraser, was elected to a third term with a reduced majority, defeating the opposition Labor Party led by Bill Hayden. This was the last federal election victory for the Coalition until the 1996 election.

Future Prime Minister Bob Hawke and future opposition leader and future Deputy Prime Minister Kim Beazley entered parliament at this election.

== Issues and significance ==
The Fraser Government had lost a degree of popularity within the electorate by 1980. The economy had been performing poorly since the 1973 oil shock. However, Hayden was not seen as having great electoral prospects. Perhaps as evidence of this, then ACTU President Bob Hawke (elected to parliament in the election as the member for Wills) and then Premier of New South Wales Neville Wran featured heavily in the campaign, almost as heavily as Hayden.

== Results ==
=== House of Representatives ===
Government (74) Coalition Liberal (54) NCP (19) CLP (1) Opposition (51) Labor (51)

House of Reps (IRV) — 1980–83—Turnout 94.35% (CV) — Informal 2.45%
Party	First preference votes	%	Swing	Seats	Change
Liberal–NCP coalition	3,853,585	46.40	–1.71	74	–12
Liberal	3,108,517	37.43	−0.66	54	−13
National Country	726,263	8.74	−1.07	19	+1
Country Liberal	18,805	0.23	+0.02	1	0
Labor	3,749,565	45.15	+5.50	51	+13
Democrats	546,032	6.57	−2.81	0	0
Democratic Labor	25,456	0.31	−1.12	0	0
Progress	17,040	0.21	−0.39	0	0
Socialist Workers	16,920	0.20	+0.20	0	0
Communist	11,318	0.14	−0.04	0	0
Socialist Labour	10,051	0.12	+0.12	0	0
NPWA	8,915	0.11	+0.11	0	0
Progressive Conservative	3,620	0.04	+0.04	0	0
United Christian	2,050	0.02	+0.02	0	0
Imperial British Conservative	1,515	0.02	+0.02	0	0
Australia	701	0.01	+0.01	0	0
Marijuana	486	0.01	+0.01	0	0
Independent	58,338	0.70	+0.07	0	0
Total	8,305,633			125	+1
Two-party-preferred (estimated)
Coalition	Win	50.40	−4.20	74	−12
Labor		49.60	+4.20	51	+13

First preference vote
Labor	45.15%
Liberal	37.43%
National	8.97%
Democrats	6.57%
Other	1.88%

Two-party-preferred vote
Coalition	50.40%
Labor	49.60%

Parliament seats
Coalition	59.20%
Labor	40.80%

=== Senate ===
Government (31) Coalition Liberal (27) NCP (3) CLP (1) Opposition (27) Labor (27) Crossbench (6) Democrats (5) Independent (1)

Senate (STV) — 1980–83—Turnout 94.35% (CV) — Informal 9.65%
Party	First preference votes	%	Swing	Seats won	Total seats	Change
Liberal–NCP coalition	3,352,521	43.58	–1.98	15	31	–3
Liberal–NCP joint ticket	1,971,528	25.63	−8.63	4	*	*
Liberal	1,011,289	13.15	+2.55	9	27	0
National Country	341,978	4.45	+3.95	1	3	–3
Country Liberal	19,129	0.25	+0.04	1	1	0
Labor	3,250,187	42.25	+5.49	15	27	0
Democrats	711,805	9.25	−1.88	3	5	+3
Call to Australia	118,535	1.54	+0.42	0	0	0
Democratic Labor	31,766	0.41	–1.26	0	0	0
Marijuana	28,337	0.37	–0.23	0	0	0
Australia	27,404	0.36	+0.25	0	0	0
Socialist	15,412	0.20	–0.38	0	0	0
Progress	8,252	0.11	–1.08	0	0	0
NPWA	7,597	0.10	+0.10	0	0	0
Progressive Conservative	6,247	0.07	+0.07	0	0	
National Front of Australia	1,467	0.01	+0.01	0	0	
Other	56,128	0.73	+0.73	0	0	0
Independent	86,770	1.13	–0.60	1	1	0
Total	7,692,364			34	64	

Notes

- Independent: Brian Harradine

== Seats changing hands ==
Seat	Pre-1980			Swing	Post-1980		
Seat	Party	Member	Margin	Swing	Margin	Member	Party
Ballarat, Vic	Liberal	Jim Short	7.5	8.2	0.7	John Mildren	Labor
Brisbane, Qld	Liberal	Peter Johnson	3.2	5.0	1.8	Manfred Cross	Labor
Canberra, ACT	Liberal	John Haslem	1.0	6.7	5.7	Ros Kelly	Labor
Henty, Vic	Liberal	Ken Aldred	2.7	5.5	2.8	Joan Child	Labor
Holt, Vic	Liberal	William Yates	1.8	8.7	6.9	Michael Duffy	Labor
Hotham, Vic	Liberal	Roger Johnston	1.7	5.7	4.0	Lewis Kent	Labor
Isaacs, Vic	Liberal	Bill Burns	7.3	9.1	1.8	David Charles	Labor
Kalgoorlie, WA	Liberal	Mick Cotter	8.5	8.1	0.6	Graeme Campbell	Labor
La Trobe, Vic	Liberal	Marshall Baillieu	0.8	3.1	2.3	Peter Milton	Labor
Lilley, Qld	Liberal	Kevin Cairns	6.0	6.8	0.8	Elaine Darling	Labor
Macquarie, NSW	Liberal	Reg Gillard	1.7	4.5	2.8	Ross Free	Labor
McMillan, Vic	Liberal	Barry Simon	4.8	6.2	1.4	Barry Cunningham	Labor
Riverina, NSW	Labor	John FitzPatrick	0.1	0.6	0.5	Noel Hicks	National Country
St George, NSW	Liberal	Maurice Neil	2.0	8.1	6.1	Bill Morrison	Labor
Swan, WA	Liberal	John Martyr	0.5	8.1	7.6	Kim Beazley	Labor

- Members listed in italics did not contest their seat at this election.

== Aftermath ==
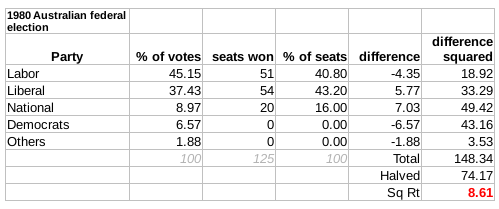
The Gallagher Index result: 8.61

In the election, Labor finished only 0.8 percent behind the Coalition on the two-party-preferred vote—a four-percent swing from 1977. However, due to the uneven nature of the swing, Labor came up 12 seats short of a majority, giving the Coalition a third term in government. Hayden, however, did manage to regain much of what Labor had lost in the previous Coalition landslides of 1975 and 1977. Notably, he managed to more than halve Fraser's majority, from 49 seats at dissolution to 23.

In the subsequent term, the government delivered budgets significantly in deficit, and Fraser was challenged for the Liberal leadership by Andrew Peacock. The Australian Democrats made further gains, winning the balance of power in the Senate. From July 1981 (when those senators elected at the 1980 election took up their positions) no federal government in Australia had a Senate majority until the Howard government won such a majority in 2004.

== See also ==
- Candidates of the Australian federal election, 1980
- Members of the Australian House of Representatives, 1980–1983
- Members of the Australian Senate, 1981–1983
