= Lewis Kent =

Australian politician

Member of the Australian Parliament for Hotham
- In office 18 October 1980 – 24 March 1990
- Preceded by: Roger Johnston
- Succeeded by: Simon Crean

Personal details
- Born: Lajco Kopolnai; 8 September 1927 Subotica, Vojvodina, Kingdom of Yugoslavia (now Serbia)
- Died: 22 June 2014 (aged 86) Melbourne, Victoria, Australia
- Party: Australian Labor Party
- Other political affiliations: Maki (Israel)
- Occupation: Stationmaster, politician

Lewis "Bata" Kent (born Lajco Kapolnai; 8 September 1927 – 22 June 2014) was an Australian politician. He was a member of the Australian Labor Party (ALP) and represented the Division of Hotham in federal parliament from 1980 to 1990. He was born in Yugoslavia and came to Australia via Israel after the Second World War.

== Early life ==
Kent was born on 8 September 1927 in Subotica, Yugoslavia, in present-day Serbia. His birth name was Lajco Kapolnai, which he later anglicised.

Kent was raised in Sombor. His parents were non-practising Jews; he received a bar mitzvah but later identified as an atheist. Following the German invasion of Yugoslavia, Kent's family and other Jews in Sombor were caught up in the Holocaust in German-occupied Serbia. In a 1987 interview, he recalled that all but five of his Jewish high school classmates were killed and described witnessing "Hungarian troops blow a retired teacher's brains out with a grenade as the teacher answered a call at his front door". He narrowly escaped being captured by the SS, and due to curfews and bombings an elderly relative he was assisting starved to death.

In 1943, Kent and his family escaped to Budapest with the aid of false identity papers. His elderly grandmother was assisted by Raoul Wallenberg in finding a safe house, but died shortly after the war's end. Following the Soviet siege of Budapest, Kent and a cousin were treated as Hungarian nationals by the Soviet Army, which made them participate in an 11-day forced march to a prison camp. His cousin died of typhoid in the camp, but he was able to escape after a few months and made his way to Belgrade. Kent subsequently completed high school and enrolled to study fine arts at Belgrade University. He married in 1948.

Kent found life in post-war Yugoslavia difficult and made aliyah to Israel later in 1948, shortly after the country's declaration of independence. He was required to renounce his Yugoslav citizenship as a condition of departure. Kent and his wife lived in Israel for five years, where he worked for the national forestry commission in northern Israel. He also joined the Israeli Communist Party and stood unsuccessfully for public office.

== Move to Australia ==
After moving to Australia in 1954, Kent worked on the railways for 26 years and attained the rank of stationmaster. He joined the Victorian Labor Party and in the late 1960s served as president of the party's New Australian Committee. He expressed concerns that the party's platform was still sympathetic to the White Australia policy and called for non-discriminatory immigration to be made an explicit policy plank.

Kent also served as chairman of the Yugoslav Welfare Society. In December 1977, he attributed the bombing of the Jat Airways offices in Melbourne to Croatian separatists in the Ustaše. He warned of possible inter-ethnic violence if the police did not intervene, stating "ninety percent of Croats are good citizens but a small percentage are terrorist types".

== Parliament ==
Kent was elected to parliament at the 1980 federal election, defeating the incumbent Liberal member Roger Johnston in the Division of Hotham. He was re-elected at the 1983, 1984 and 1987 elections. He served on several parliamentary committees and joined a number of parliamentary delegations to other countries.

Kent was a member of the Labor Left faction and came into conflict with the Hawke government on a number of occasions. In 1986, he walked out of Paul Keating's budget speech, along with Peter Milton and John Scott, when it was announced that the government would resume uranium sales to France. During the debate over the introduction of the Australia Card, Kent said that it was un-Australian and that it would be more appropriate to call it a Hitlercard or Stalincard.

In 1989, Kent was deselected as Labor candidate for Hotham in favour of ACTU president Simon Crean. In November that year, Liberal MPs Ken Aldred and Jim Short alleged that Kent was "an agent of a foreign power" and had ties to the UDBA, the Yugoslav secret police. Their allegations were based on a statutory declaration from a member of Melbourne's Yugoslav community. Kent vigorously denied their claims, describing them as a smear campaign. He was suspended from parliament for 24 hours for using unparliamentary language. The House of Representatives later voted on party lines to suspend Aldred for two days, following a report from the privileges committee.

Kent's political career ended at the 1990 federal election, when he attempted to transfer to the newly created Division of Corinella. He was defeated by the Liberal candidate Russell Broadbent.

== Later life ==
Kent died in June 2014. He had two children with his wife Vera, who died a few years earlier.

Parliament of Australia
| Preceded by Roger Johnston | Member for Hotham; 1980–1990 | Succeeded by Simon Crean |
