= Frank Timson =

Australian politician

Frank Timson MBE
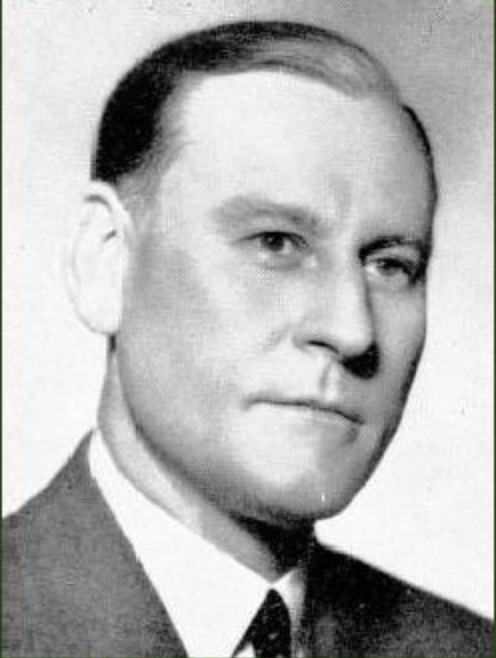

Member of the Australian Parliament for Higinbotham
- In office 10 December 1949 – 16 October 1960
- Preceded by: New seat
- Succeeded by: Don Chipp

Personal details
- Born: 9 February 1909 Melbourne, Victoria
- Died: 16 October 1960 (aged 51) Seoul, South Korea
- Party: Liberal
- Occupation: Firm director

Thomas Frank Timson MBE (9 February 1909 – 16 October 1960) was an Australian politician. Born in Melbourne, he was educated at Caulfield Grammar School and Wesley College before becoming the director of the Timson Trading Company, a Melbourne importing and exporting firm. He served in the military 1940–1945. He was awarded the MBE in the military division and, having enlisted as a private in 1940, was discharged from the AIF in 1945 with the rank of Major. In 1949, he was elected to the Australian House of Representatives as the Liberal member for the new seat of Higinbotham. He held the seat until his death in 1960.

Timson died on 16 October 1960 while leading an Australian parliamentary goodwill mission to South Korea, following on from the conference of the International Parliamentary Union in Tokyo. He suffered a fatal heart attack in his hotel room in Seoul.

== See also ==
- List of Caulfield Grammar School people

== Footnotes ==
Parliament of Australia
| Preceded by New seat | Member for Higinbotham; 1949–1960 | Succeeded by Don Chipp |
