= Division of Hotham =

Australian federal electoral division

Coordinates: 37.946°S 145.097°E

Hotham Australian House of Representatives Division
- Interactive map of electorate boundaries from the 2025 federal election
- Created: 1969
- MP: Clare O'Neil
- Party: Labor
- Namesake: Sir Charles Hotham
- Electors: 119,047 (2025)
- Area: 81 km^{2} (31.3 sq mi)
- Demographic: Inner metropolitan

The Division of Hotham is an Australian electoral division in Victoria. It is located in the south-eastern suburbs of Melbourne. Hotham covers an area of approximately 83 square kilometres from Oakleigh in the north to Keysborough in the south. The division includes the suburbs of Bentleigh East, Carnegie, Clarinda, Clayton South, Coatesville, Huntingdale, Murrumbeena, Noble Park, Oakleigh East, Oakleigh South, Springvale, Waverley Park, Westall in their entirety; as well as parts of Bentleigh, Clayton, Hughesdale, Keysborough, Mulgrave, Noble Park North, Oakleigh and Springvale South.

== Geography ==
Since 1984, federal electoral division boundaries in Australia have been determined at redistributions by a redistribution committee appointed by the Australian Electoral Commission. Redistributions occur for the boundaries of divisions in a particular state, and they occur every seven years, or sooner if a state's representation entitlement changes or when divisions of a state are malapportioned.

The Division includes parts of the local government areas of Glen Eira City Council, Greater Dandenong City Council, Kingston City Council and Monash City Council.

== History ==
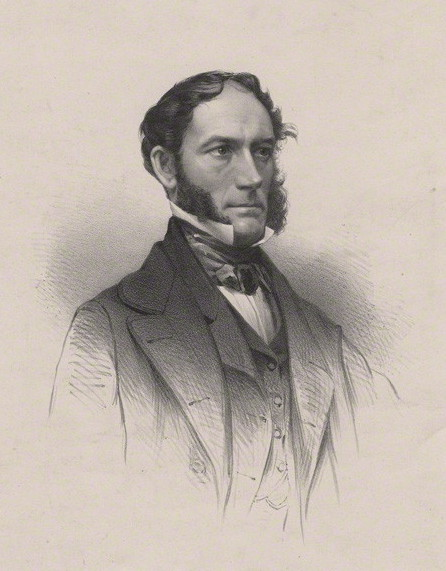
Sir Charles Hotham, the division's namesake

The division was created in 1969 and is named for Sir Charles Hotham, Governor of Victoria 1854–55. The division was originally created as a reconfigured version of the Division of Higinbotham, and as such was on paper a safe Liberal seat. The last member for Higinbotham, prominent Liberal Don Chipp, transferred to Hotham. Chipp served as a minister under John Gorton, William McMahon and Malcolm Fraser—as well as Harold Holt and John McEwen while he held his old seat. He ended up quitting the party in 1977 due to personal animosity towards Fraser to form the Australian Democrats, and shortly thereafter transferred to the Senate.

Demographic changes during the 1970s made the Liberals' hold increasingly tenuous, and it was nearly lost to Labor in 1977 despite a national Coalition landslide. Chipp's Liberal successor Roger Johnston finally lost Hotham to Labor in 1980. Labor has held the seat since then, and consolidated its hold on the seat in the 1990s to make it one of the party's safer seats in Melbourne.

Besides Chipp, the seat's most prominent member was Simon Crean, who was Opposition Leader from 2001 until December 2003 and was either a minister or opposition frontbencher from June 1991 to March 2013. Crean retired at the 2013 election and was succeeded by fellow Labor member Clare O'Neil. Since 2022, O'Neil has been the Minister for Home Affairs and Minister for Cyber Security in the Albanese Labor Government.

== Members ==
Image	Member	Party	Term	Notes
	Don Chipp (1925–2006)	Liberal	25 October 1969 – 24 March 1977	Previously held the Division of Higinbotham. Served as minister under Gorton, McMahon and Fraser. Transferred to the Senate
	Don Chipp (1925–2006)	Independent	24 March 1977 – 9 May 1977	Previously held the Division of Higinbotham. Served as minister under Gorton, McMahon and Fraser. Transferred to the Senate
	Don Chipp (1925–2006)	Australian Democrats	9 May 1977 – 10 November 1977	Previously held the Division of Higinbotham. Served as minister under Gorton, McMahon and Fraser. Transferred to the Senate
	Roger Johnston (1930–2020)	Liberal	10 December 1977 – 18 October 1980	Lost seat
	Lewis Kent (1927–2014)	Labor	18 October 1980 – 24 March 1990	Did not contest in 1990. Failed to win the Division of Corinella
	Simon Crean (1949–2023)	Labor	24 March 1990 – 5 August 2013	Served as minister under Hawke, Keating, Rudd and Gillard. Served as Opposition Leader from 2001 to 2003. Retired
	Clare O'Neil (1980–)	Labor	7 September 2013 – present	Incumbent. Currently a minister under Albanese

== Election results ==
2025 Australian federal election: Hotham
Party	Candidate	Votes	%	±%
Labor	Clare O'Neil	51,880	48.85	+5.74
Liberal	Harmick Singh Matharu	27,346	25.75	−2.81
Greens	Martin Barry	15,780	14.86	+0.21
One Nation	Stuart Fogarty	4,959	4.67	+2.29
Family First	Mark Brown	3,592	3.38	+3.38
Citizens	Tony Vainoras	2,654	2.50	+2.46
Total formal votes		106,211	96.64	+0.19
Informal votes		3,692	3.36	−0.19
Turnout		109,903	92.36	+2.59
Two-party-preferred result
Labor	Clare O'Neil	71,012	66.86	+5.27
Liberal	Harmick Singh Matharu	35,199	33.14	−5.27
Labor hold		Swing	+5.27	
