= Roger Johnston =

Australian politician (1930–2020)

Member of the Australian Parliament for Hotham
- In office 10 December 1977 – 18 October 1980
- Preceded by: Don Chipp
- Succeeded by: Lewis Kent

Personal details
- Born: James Roger Johnston; 18 June 1930 Melbourne, Victoria, Australia
- Died: 24 June 2020 (aged 90)
- Party: Liberal Party of Australia
- Occupation: Businessperson
- Profession: Civil engineer

James Roger Johnston (18 June 1930 – 24 June 2020) was an Australian politician. He contested the Division of Melbourne Ports in 1975, but lost to the incumbent Labor member Frank Crean. Following this, Johnston successfully sought Liberal preselection for Hotham, competing against nine other members. In 1977, he was elected to the Australian House of Representatives as the Liberal member for Hotham. He was a member of the Parliamentary Yacht Club, along with Phillip Lynch, Alan Cadman and Marshall Baillieu. In 1979, Johnston was part of a delegation of Australian parliamentarians sent to Port Moresby to learn about resources development. He was defeated in 1980. He attempted to gain preselection for the 1982 Flinders by-election.

Johnston died on 24 June 2020, at the age of 90. He was a great-grandson of David Syme.

Parliament of Australia
Preceded by Don Chipp	Member for Hotham; 1977–1980	Succeeded by Lewis Kent
