= Don Chipp =

Australian politician (1925–2006)

The Honourable Don Chipp AO
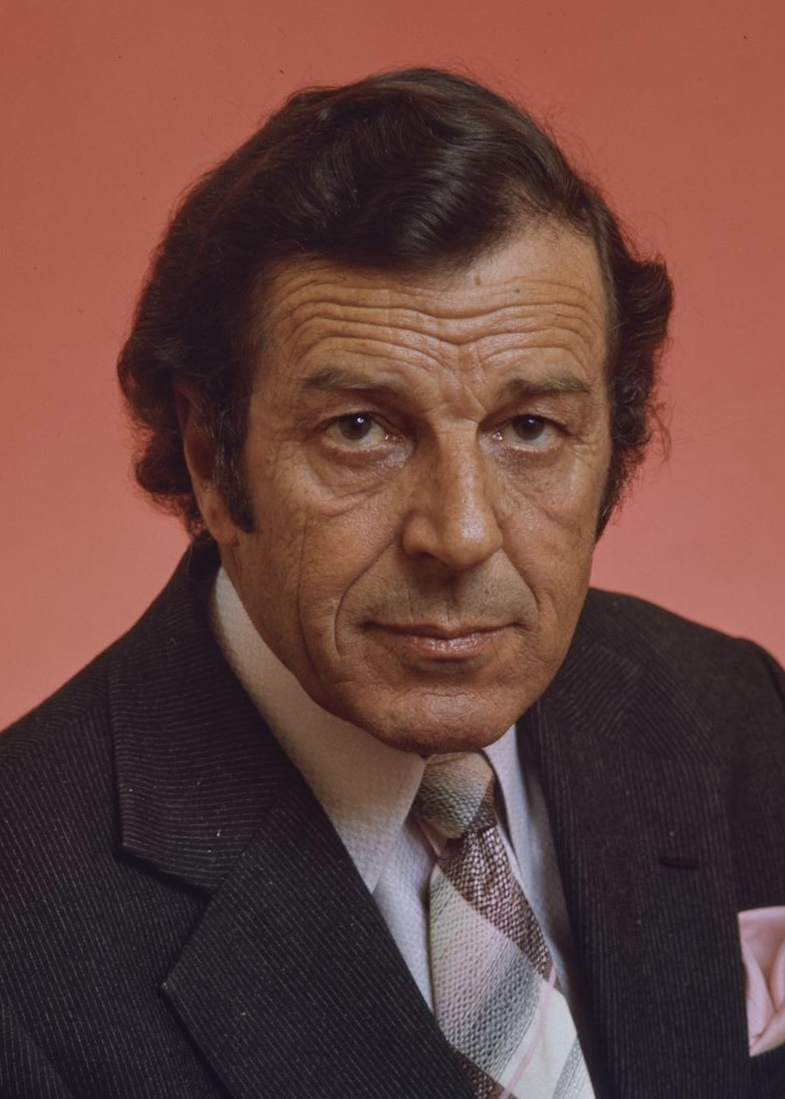
- Official portrait, 1974

Leader of the Australian Democrats
- In office 9 May 1977 – 18 August 1986
- Deputy: Colin Mason; Janine Haines
- Preceded by: Party established
- Succeeded by: Janine Haines

Minister for Health
- In office 11 November 1975 – 22 December 1975
- Prime Minister: Malcolm Fraser
- Preceded by: Doug Everingham
- Succeeded by: Ralph Hunt

Minister for Repatriation and Compensation
- In office 11 November 1975 – 22 December 1975
- Prime Minister: Malcolm Fraser
- Preceded by: John Wheeldon
- Succeeded by: Kevin Newman

Minister for Social Security
- In office 11 November 1975 – 22 December 1975
- Prime Minister: Malcolm Fraser
- Preceded by: John Wheeldon
- Succeeded by: Margaret Guilfoyle

Minister for Customs and Excise
- In office 12 November 1969 – 5 December 1972
- Prime Minister: John Gorton; William McMahon
- Preceded by: Malcolm Scott
- Succeeded by: Gough Whitlam

Minister-in-charge of Tourist Activities
- In office 14 December 1966 – 28 February 1968
- Prime Minister: Harold Holt; John McEwen; John Gorton
- Preceded by: Office established
- Succeeded by: Reg Wright

Minister for Defence Minister for the Navy
- In office 14 December 1966 – 28 February 1968
- Prime Minister: Harold Holt; John McEwen; John Gorton
- Preceded by: Fred Chaney
- Succeeded by: Bert Kelly

Senator for Victoria
- In office 1 July 1978 – 18 August 1986
- Succeeded by: Janet Powell

Member of the Australian Parliament for Hotham
- In office 25 October 1969 – 10 November 1977
- Preceded by: Constituency created
- Succeeded by: Roger Johnston

Member of the Australian Parliament for Higinbotham
- In office 10 December 1960 – 25 October 1969
- Preceded by: Frank Timson
- Succeeded by: Constituency abolished

Personal details
- Born: Donald Leslie Chipp; 21 August 1925 Melbourne, Victoria, Australia
- Died: 28 August 2006 (aged 81) Richmond, Victoria, Australia
- Party: Democrat (after 1977)
- Other political affiliations: Independent (1955–1958; 1977); Liberal (1958–1977)
- Spouses: Monica Lalor (m. 1951; div. 1979) Idun Welz (m. 1979; wid. 2006)
- Education: Northcote High School
- Alma mater: University of Melbourne
- Occupation: Consultancy company chairman (Donald L. Chipp & Co.); Chief executive officer (CPA Australia)
- Profession: Businessman; Politician

Military service
- Allegiance: Commonwealth of Australia
- Branch/service: Royal Australian Air Force
- Years of service: 1943–1945
- Battles/wars: World War II

Donald Leslie Chipp, AO (21 August 1925 – 28 August 2006) was an Australian politician who was the inaugural leader of the Australian Democrats, leading the party from 1977 to 1986. He began his career as a member of the Liberal Party, winning election to the House of Representatives in 1960 and serving as a government minister for a cumulative total of six years. Chipp left the Liberals in 1977 and was soon persuaded to lead a new party, the Democrats who, he famously proclaimed in 1980, would "keep the bastards honest". He was elected to the Senate on 10 December 1977 and led the party at four federal elections. From 1983 it held the sole balance of power in the Senate. He retired from Parliament in 1986, having served a total of 25 years.

== Early life ==
Don Chipp was born in Melbourne and educated at Northcote Primary School, Northcote High School and the University of Melbourne, where he graduated in commerce.

After playing Australian rules football for Heidelberg, he played briefly in the Victorian Football League with the Fitzroy Football Club (playing three games in 1947, for one goal). He also played for Prahran in the VFA and was a member of their 1951 premiership side.

A champion sprinter who won the 1952 Hastings Gift, the 1952 Maribyrnong Gift and the Seymour Gift in March 1953. Chipp was narrowly defeated in heat 22 of the 1953 Stawell Gift foot race.

After serving in the Royal Australian Air Force in World War II, Chipp worked as registrar of the Commonwealth Institute of Accountants from 1950 to 1955. In 1955, he was appointed chief executive officer of the Olympic Civic Committee which was involved in organising the 1956 Summer Olympics in Melbourne. Later, he worked as manager of the Victorian Promotion Committee, and he also ran his own management consultancy. From 1958 to 1961, he was a member of the Kew City Council.

== Early parliamentary career ==
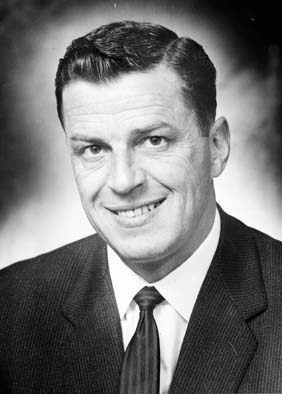
Chipp in 1966.

Chipp entered federal politics in 1960 as the Liberal member for Higinbotham in Melbourne's southern bayside suburbs. Higinbotham was abolished in 1969, and Chipp followed most of his constituents into the new seat of Hotham. He was given the Navy and Tourism portfolios by Prime Minister Harold Holt in 1967. After Holt's sudden disappearance in December 1967, Chipp retained those portfolios in the brief interim government of Country Party leader John McEwen, but he was dropped from the ministry by the new Liberal Prime Minister, John Gorton. That was partly because Chipp had supported another candidate, Billy Snedden, in the Liberal leadership ballot and partly because Chipp did not support a second Royal Commission into the 1964 Voyager disaster, which Gorton felt reflected badly on the Royal Australian Navy.

After the 1969 election, Gorton appointed Chipp as Minister for Customs and Excise. In that portfolio, he gained national attention by largely abolishing the censorship of printed material, unbanning many novels, including Henry Miller's Tropic of Cancer, as well as allowing the sale of Playboy magazine. He also oversaw the introduction of the R certificate for films in 1970, which allowed previously banned films to be rerated and shown to adults. The actions made him widely popular but were disapproved of by more conservative Liberal Party colleagues who identified him as a "small-l liberal", along with Snedden and Andrew Peacock.

Following the Liberal Party's defeat at the 1972 election by the Labor Party's Gough Whitlam, Chipp served as Shadow Minister for Social Security. He was a strong supporter of Snedden, who had become party leader following the 1972 defeat but lost the 1974 election against Whitlam. When Malcolm Fraser displaced Snedden as leader in March 1975, Chipp retained his position, but it was no secret that the two men did not get on. When Fraser was appointed prime minister following the dismissal of Gough Whitlam on 11 November 1975, he gave Chipp three portfolios in his caretaker ministry: Social Security, Health, and Repatriation and Compensation. However, when Fraser won the election the next month, Chipp was not included in the ministry.

== Resignation from Liberal Party ==
In his book The Third Man, Chipp considered the effects of a "whispering campaign" to discredit him within the Liberal Party. That came to a head on 8 March 1977 when he spoke at a heavily attended Citizens for Democracy meeting at the Sydney Town Hall with other controversial speakers including Frank Hardy, Patrick White, Donald Horne and Faith Bandler. He writes "Liberals thought it was intolerable that any member of the party should appear with 'those people'". Chipp concluded: "It was then, I believe, that I concluded I could not stay in such a party any longer. I resented the tag of 'rebel' which was being applied to me by my own colleagues." The rebellious image was heightened by the fact that Chipp omitted to attend a Parliament House reception for Queen Elizabeth II. He had decided to honour his prior speaking engagement, which had been widely publicised. The meeting, attended by 5,000, "almost went out of control when I stated that Sir John Kerr had no alternative than to act as he did on 11 November 1975. Donald Horne pleaded for order, saying "This man deserves a hearing; he is putting his political career on the line by speaking here."

Chipp decided to resign from the Liberal Party on 24 March 1977 and concluded his speech that day with the following:

I have become disenchanted with party politics as they are practised in this country and with the pressure groups which have an undue influence on the major political parties. The parties seem to polarise on almost every issue, sometimes seemingly just for the sake of it, and I wonder if the ordinary voter is not becoming sick and tired of the vested interests which unduly influence political parties and yearns for the emergence of a third political force, representing middle-of-the-road policies which would owe allegiance to no outside pressure group. Perhaps it may be the right time to test that proposition.

== Leadership of Democrats ==
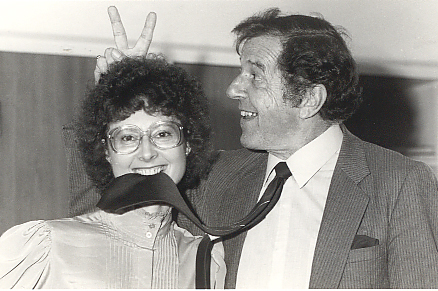
Janine Haines and Chipp in 1977

Even before the resignation, he received an invitation to join the amalgamated Centre-Line Party, which predated the Australian Democrats. He resolutely turned down a series of such leadership offers until, on 9 May 1977, he was accorded an overwhelming standing ovation by a 3,000-strong audience at the Melbourne Town Hall. The meeting was attended by former prime minister John Gorton and chaired by South Australian Governor Sir Mark Oliphant. Speakers included Robin Millhouse, Charles Birch and John Siddons. Chipp concluded, "... I was committed ... and it was a good feeling”.

At the December 1977 election, Chipp was elected to the Australian Senate as a Democrats candidate, with one colleague (Colin Mason of New South Wales). As Democrats leader, Chipp was involved in various high-profile environmental and social-justice causes, including playing an important role in stopping the Franklin Dam project.

At the 1980 election, the Democrats gained three more senators, giving them a total of five. They held a potential balance of power, which they retained for most of the time until 1 July 2005, after a total lack of success at the 2004 election. Their theoretical ability to reject or amend government legislation was seldom applied, as it was dependent on rare support from other non-government senators. It was, however, a useful avenue for publicity and effective Senate committee dealings outside the chamber.

== Later life ==
Chipp resigned from the Senate on 18 August 1986, being succeeded as leader by Janine Haines and replaced as a senator by Janet Powell.

From 1988 to 1990, Chipp conducted a regular talkback program on Melbourne radio station 3AK.

He ran unsuccessfully for election as the Lord Mayor of Melbourne in 2001. In his later years, he suffered from Parkinson's disease, but he still made a number of public appearances, most notably on the ABC chat show Enough Rope with Andrew Denton. He also gave an opening address to the Democrats' national conference in Melbourne in May 2006.

Chipp died of pneumonia in August 2006 at Epworth Hospital in Melbourne. A state funeral service was held on 2 September 2006 for him. Australian flags were flown at half-mast all day in Victoria and the Australian Capital Territory in his honour.

== Personal life ==
Don Chipp; The Third Man, by Don Chipp and John Larkin

Chipp was married twice.

On 27 October 1951, he married Monica Lalor. With her support, Chipp stood and won a seat on the Kew City Council which he held from 1955 to 1961, and was encouraged- at that time – to become an active member of the Liberal Party. They had four children.

Chipp and Lalor divorced in 1979, and Chipp married Idun Welz later that same year. They had two children.

His eldest son, Greg Chipp, established Drug Law Reform Australia, a political party focused on the decriminalisation of illegal drugs, and contested the 2013 and 2016 federal elections. Don Chipp's youngest daughter, Laura Chipp, contested the 2017 by-election in the Victorian electorate of Northcote, representing the Reason Party (formerly known as the Australian Sex Party).

Political offices
Preceded by Fred Chaney	Minister for the Navy; 1966–1968	Succeeded by Bert Kelly
New title	Minister in charge of Tourist Activities; 1966–1968	Succeeded by Reg Wright
Preceded by Malcolm Scott	Minister for Customs and Excise; 1969–1972	Succeeded by Gough Whitlam
Preceded by John Wheeldon	Minister for Social Security; 1975	Succeeded by Margaret Guilfoyle
Preceded by John Wheeldon	Minister for Repatriation and Compensation; 1975	Succeeded by Kevin Newman
Preceded by Doug Everingham	Minister for Health; 1975	Succeeded by Ralph Hunt
Parliament of Australia
Preceded by Frank Timson	Member for Higinbotham; 1960–1969	Division abolished
New division	Member for Hotham; 1969–1977	Succeeded by Roger Johnston
Preceded by No party precursor	Senator for Victoria; 1978–1986	Succeeded by Janet Powell
Party political offices
New political party	Leader of the Australian Democrats; 1977–1986	Succeeded by Janine Haines
