= 1954 Australian House of Representatives election =

Australian federal election, 29 May 1954 House of Representatives << 1951–1955 >>
Enrolled voters	5,096,468				
Votes cast	4,619,571		Turnout	96.09	+0.09
Informal votes	91,910		Informal	1.99	+0.09
Summary of votes by party
Party	Primary votes	%	Swing	Seats	Change
Labor	2,266,979	50.07%	+2.44%	57	+ 5
Liberal	1,765,799	39.00%	–1.62%	47	– 5
Country	388,171	8.57%	–1.15%	17	± 0
Communist	56,675	1.25%	+0.27%	0	± 0
Independent	50,027	1.11%	+0.06%	0	± 0
Total	4,527,651			121	

This is a list of electoral division results for the Australian 1954 federal election.

== New South Wales ==
1954 Australian federal election (New South Wales)
- 29 May 1954

All 47 NSW seats in the House of Representatives 24 seats needed for a majority
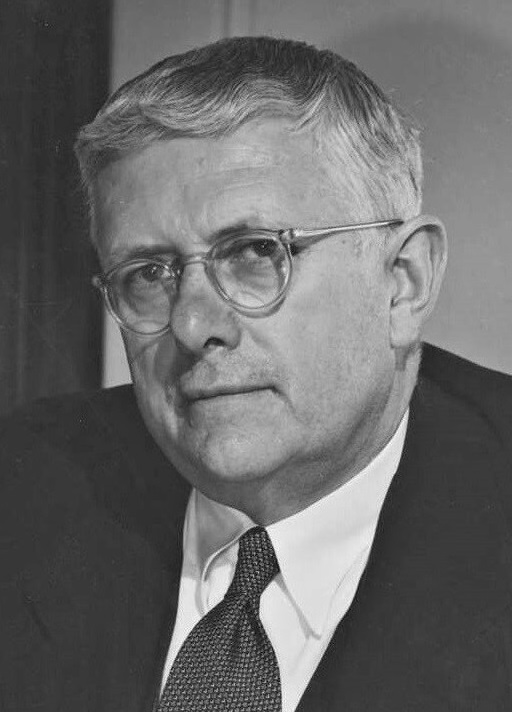

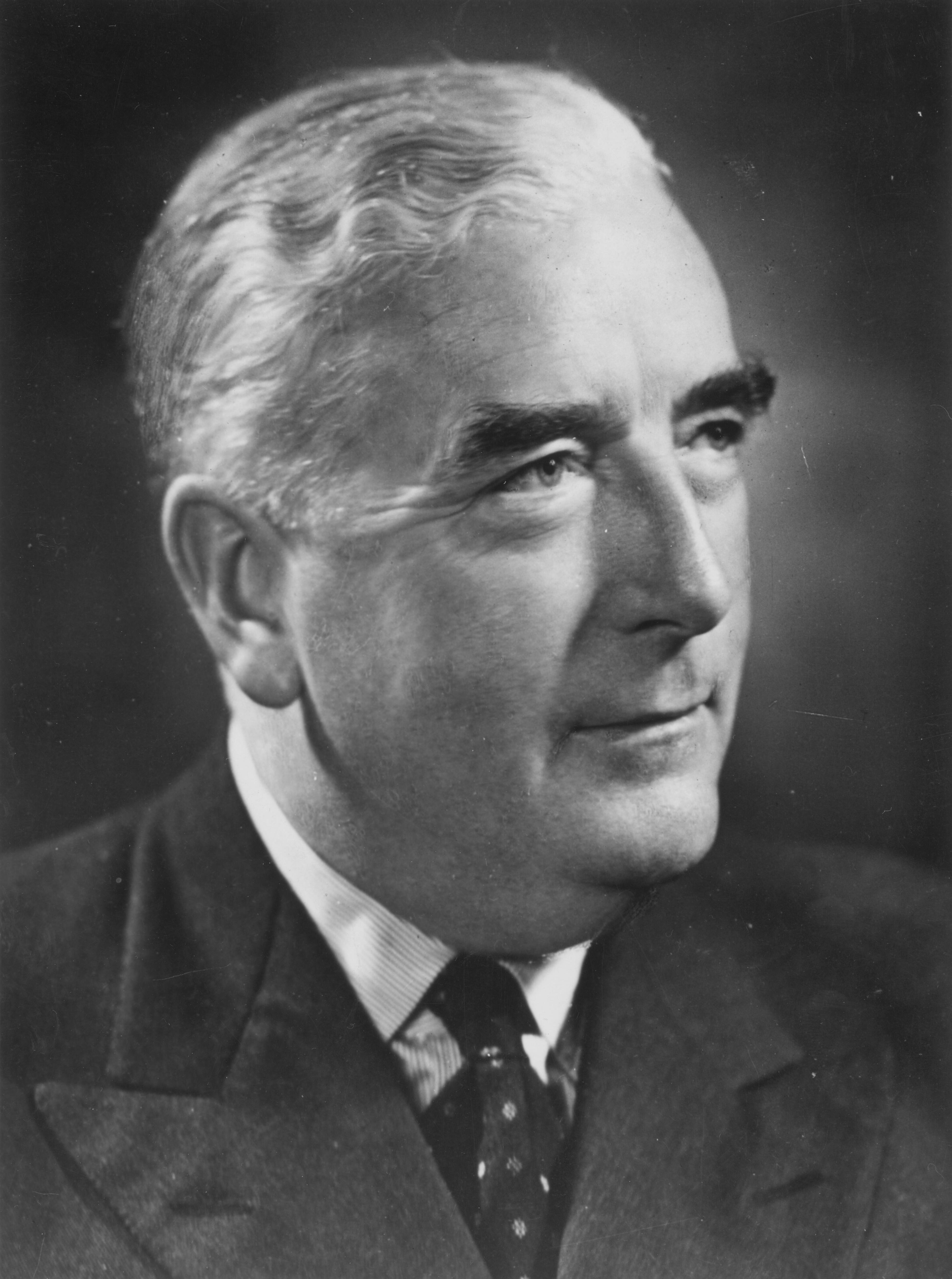
	First party	Second party
Leader	H. V. Evatt	Robert Menzies
Party	Labor	Coalition
Seats before	24	23
Seats won	25	22
Seat change	▲1	▼1
Popular vote	910,350	634,290
Percentage	52.4%	44.1%
Swing	▲3.3pp	▼5.0pp
TPP	53.0%	47.0%
TPP swing	▲2.5pp	▼2.5pp

=== Banks ===
This section is an excerpt from Electoral results for the Division of Banks § 1954

1954 Australian federal election: Banks
Party	Candidate	Votes	%	±%
Labor	Eric Costa	34,241	61.4	−0.3
Liberal	Harold Stalker	18,589	33.4	−4.9
Communist	Pat Clancy	2,908	5.2	+5.2
Total formal votes		55,738	98.6	
Informal votes		816	1.4	
Turnout		56,554	96.2	
Two-party-preferred result
Labor	Eric Costa		66.1	+4.4
Liberal	Harold Stalker		33.9	−4.4
Labor hold		Swing	+4.4	

=== Barton ===
This section is an excerpt from Electoral results for the Division of Barton § 1954

1954 Australian federal election: Barton
Party	Candidate	Votes	%	±%
Labor	Herbert Evatt	23,303	54.7	+4.4
Liberal	Bill Arthur	19,260	45.3	−4.4
Total formal votes		42,563	99.0	
Informal votes		435	1.0	
Turnout		42,998	96.8	
Labor hold		Swing	+4.4	

=== Bennelong ===
This section is an excerpt from Electoral results for the Division of Bennelong § 1954

1954 Australian federal election: Bennelong
Party	Candidate	Votes	%	±%
Liberal	John Cramer	24,338	57.1	−3.9
Labor	Thomas Campbell	18,263	42.9	+3.9
Total formal votes		42,601	98.8	
Informal votes		517	1.2	
Turnout		43,118	96.3	
Liberal hold		Swing	−3.9	

=== Blaxland ===
This section is an excerpt from Electoral results for the Division of Blaxland § 1954

1954 Australian federal election: Blaxland
Party	Candidate	Votes	%	±%
Labor	Jim Harrison	27,621	64.9	+1.0
Liberal	Reginald Allsop	13,604	32.0	−4.1
Communist	Jack Hughes	1,308	3.1	+3.1
Total formal votes		42,533	98.7	
Informal votes		539	1.3	
Turnout		43,072	95.3	
Two-party-preferred result
Labor	Jim Harrison		67.7	+3.8
Liberal	Reginald Allsop		32.3	−3.8
Labor hold		Swing	+3.8	

=== Bradfield ===
This section is an excerpt from Electoral results for the Division of Bradfield § 1954

1954 Australian federal election: Bradfield
Party	Candidate	Votes	%	±%
Liberal	Harry Turner	unopposed		
Liberal hold		Swing		

=== Calare ===
This section is an excerpt from Electoral results for the Division of Calare § 1954

1954 Australian federal election: Calare
Party	Candidate	Votes	%	±%
Liberal	John Howse	21,733	55.7	+1.3
Labor	John Breen	16,872	43.2	+3.2
Independent	Madge Roberts	447	1.1	+1.1
Total formal votes		39,052	99.3	
Informal votes		287	0.7	
Turnout		39,339	96.9	
Two-party-preferred result
Liberal	John Howse		56.3	+0.1
Labor	John Breen		43.7	−0.1
Liberal hold		Swing	+0.1	

=== Cook ===
This section is an excerpt from Electoral results for the Division of Cook (1906–1955) § 1954

1954 Australian federal election: Cook
Party	Candidate	Votes	%	±%
Labor	Tom Sheehan	26,841	83.4	+5.3
Independent	Percy Staines	2,868	8.9	+8.9
Communist	Harry Hatfield	2,465	7.7	−0.7
Total formal votes		32,174	97.4	
Informal votes		851	2.6	
Turnout		33,025	94.9	
Two-party-preferred result
Labor	Tom Sheehan		90.4	+4.7
Independent	Percy Staines		9.6	+9.6
Labor hold		Swing	+4.7	

=== Cunningham ===
This section is an excerpt from Electoral results for the Division of Cunningham § 1954

1954 Australian federal election: Cunningham
Party	Candidate	Votes	%	±%
Labor	Billy Davies	27,683	62.1	+0.4
Liberal	John Parkinson	14,067	31.9	−0.1
Communist	Bill Parkinson	2,644	6.0	−0.2
Total formal votes		44,094	98.7	
Informal votes		588	1.3	
Turnout		44,682	96.0	
Two-party-preferred result
Labor	Billy Davies		67.5	+0.2
Liberal	John Parkinson		32.5	−0.2
Labor hold		Swing	+0.2	

=== Cowper ===
This section is an excerpt from Electoral results for the Division of Cowper § 1954

1954 Australian federal election: Cowper
Party	Candidate	Votes	%	±%
Country	Sir Earle Page	21,767	58.8	−2.2
Labor	William Bailey	14,751	39.8	+2.8
Communist	Kenneth Harding	503	1.4	+1.4
Total formal votes		37,021	99.1	
Informal votes		330	0.9	
Turnout		37,351	95.7	
Two-party-preferred result
Country	Sir Earle Page		58.9	−3.1
Labor	William Bailey		41.1	+3.1
Country hold		Swing	−3.1	

=== Dalley ===
This section is an excerpt from Electoral results for the Division of Dalley § 1954

1954 Australian federal election: Dalley
Party	Candidate	Votes	%	±%
Labor	Arthur Greenup	24,292	71.6	+4.5
Liberal	Robert Stafford	7,810	23.0	−9.9
Communist	Flo Davis	1,803	5.3	+5.3
Total formal votes		33,905	98.3	
Informal votes		594	1.7	
Turnout		34,499	95.4	
Two-party-preferred result
Labor	Arthur Greenup		76.6	+9.5
Liberal	Robert Stafford		23.4	−9.5
Labor hold		Swing	+9.5	

=== Darling ===
This section is an excerpt from Electoral results for the Division of Darling § 1954

1954 Australian federal election: Darling
Party	Candidate	Votes	%	±%
Labor	Joe Clark	23,875	70.5	+1.7
Country	Rodan Dawson	10,012	29.5	−1.7
Total formal votes		33,887	98.2	
Informal votes		607	1.8	
Turnout		34,494	93.9	
Labor hold		Swing	+1.7	

=== East Sydney ===
This section is an excerpt from Electoral results for the Division of East Sydney § 1954

1954 Australian federal election: East Sydney
Party	Candidate	Votes	%	±%
Labor	Eddie Ward	19,282	58.0	+3.1
Liberal	George Chambers	12,068	36.3	−8.8
Communist	Bill Brown	1,904	5.7	+5.7
Total formal votes		33,254	98.2	
Informal votes		600	1.8	
Turnout		33,854	94.8	
Two-party-preferred result
Labor	Eddie Ward		62.2	+7.3
Liberal	George Chambers		37.8	−7.3
Labor hold		Swing	+7.3	

=== Eden-Monaro ===
This section is an excerpt from Electoral results for the Division of Eden-Monaro § 1954

1954 Australian federal election: Eden-Monaro
Party	Candidate	Votes	%	±%
Labor	Allan Fraser	20,824	52.1	+1.1
Liberal	Royce Beavis	19,149	47.9	−1.1
Total formal votes		39,973	99.2	
Informal votes		309	0.8	
Turnout		40,282	95.9	
Labor hold		Swing	+1.1	

=== Evans ===
This section is an excerpt from Electoral results for the Division of Evans § 1954

1954 Australian federal election: Evans
Party	Candidate	Votes	%	±%
Liberal	Frederick Osborne	19,413	55.0	−3.6
Labor	Robert Bailey	15,876	45.0	+3.6
Total formal votes		35,289	98.9	
Informal votes		397	1.1	
Turnout		35,686	96.0	
Liberal hold		Swing	−3.6	

=== Farrer ===
This section is an excerpt from Electoral results for the Division of Farrer § 1954

1954 Australian federal election: Farrer
Party	Candidate	Votes	%	±%
Liberal	David Fairbairn	22,668	57.1	+0.7
Labor	Daniel Byrnes	17,005	42.9	−0.7
Total formal votes		39,673	99.2	
Informal votes		339	0.8	
Turnout		40,012	96.8	
Liberal hold		Swing	+0.7	

=== Grayndler ===
This section is an excerpt from Electoral results for the Division of Grayndler § 1954

1954 Australian federal election: Grayndler
Party	Candidate	Votes	%	±%
Labor	Fred Daly	26,495	76.8	+1.9
Liberal	Kenneth Innes	7,288	21.1	−1.3
Independent	William McCristal	702	2.0	−0.6
Total formal votes		34,485	98.4	
Informal votes		576	1.6	
Turnout		35,061	96.1	
Two-party-preferred result
Labor	Fred Daly		77.8	+1.6
Liberal	Kenneth Innes		22.2	−1.6
Labor hold		Swing	+1.6	

=== Gwydir ===
This section is an excerpt from Electoral results for the Division of Gwydir § 1954

1954 Australian federal election: Gwydir
Party	Candidate	Votes	%	±%
Country	Ian Allan	20,101	53.1	−0.1
Labor	Michael Quinn	17,731	46.9	+0.1
Total formal votes		37,832	99.3	
Informal votes		264	0.7	
Turnout		38,096	95.7	
Country hold		Swing	−0.1	

=== Hume ===
This section is an excerpt from Electoral results for the Division of Hume § 1954

1954 Australian federal election: Hume
Party	Candidate	Votes	%	±%
Labor	Arthur Fuller	19,617	50.4	+0.1
Country	Charles Anderson	12,459	32.0	−17.7
Liberal	Linden Roth	6,845	17.6	+17.6
Total formal votes		38,921	99.4	
Informal votes		248	0.6	
Turnout		39,169	97.0	
Two-party-preferred result
Labor	Arthur Fuller		52.2	+1.9
Country	Charles Anderson		47.8	−1.9
Labor hold		Swing	+1.9	

=== Hunter ===
This section is an excerpt from Electoral results for the Division of Hunter § 1954

1954 Australian federal election: Hunter
Party	Candidate	Votes	%	±%
Labor	Rowley James	29,637	67.1	−3.7
Liberal	Edward Farrell	8,380	19.0	+2.1
Communist	Evan Phillips	2,710	6.1	−1.1
Independent	John McCroarey	2,594	5.9	+5.9
Independent	John White	875	2.0	+2.0
Total formal votes		44,196	98.0	
Informal votes		905	2.0	
Turnout		45,101	96.9	
Two-party-preferred result
Labor	Rowley James		76.5	−2.4
Liberal	Edward Farrell		33.5	+2.4
Labor hold		Swing	−2.4	

=== Kingsford Smith ===
This section is an excerpt from Electoral results for the Division of Kingsford Smith § 1954

1954 Australian federal election: Kingsford-Smith
Party	Candidate	Votes	%	±%
Labor	Gordon Anderson	18,302	54.2	+3.7
Liberal	George Dan	15,435	45.8	−3.7
Total formal votes		33,737	98.7	
Informal votes		444	1.3	
Turnout		34,181	95.7	
Labor hold		Swing	+3.7	

=== Lang ===
This section is an excerpt from Electoral results for the Division of Lang § 1954

1954 Australian federal election: Lang
Party	Candidate	Votes	%	±%
Labor	Frank Stewart	23,472	54.6	+4.6
Liberal	John Spicer	19,509	45.4	+0.1
Total formal votes		42,981	98.9	
Informal votes		487	1.1	
Turnout		43,468	96.8	
Labor hold		Swing	+1.4	

=== Lawson ===
This section is an excerpt from Electoral results for the Division of Lawson § 1954

1954 Australian federal election: Lawson
Party	Candidate	Votes	%	±%
Labor	Alan Manning	18,998	48.9	+1.9
Country	Laurie Failes	18,497	47.6	−5.4
Independent	Dick Bourke	1,373	3.5	+3.5
Total formal votes		38,868	99.3	
Informal votes		289	0.7	
Turnout		39,157	96.4	
Two-party-preferred result
Country	Laurie Failes	19,565	50.3	−2.7
Labor	Alan Manning	19,303	49.7	+2.7
Country hold		Swing	−2.7	

=== Lowe ===
This section is an excerpt from Electoral results for the Division of Lowe § 1954

1954 Australian federal election: Lowe
Party	Candidate	Votes	%	±%
Liberal	William McMahon	21,380	57.8	+0.0
Labor	William Webster	15,602	42.2	+0.0
Total formal votes		36,982	98.8	
Informal votes		449	1.2	
Turnout		37,431	96.6	
Liberal hold		Swing	+0.0	

=== Lyne ===
This section is an excerpt from Electoral results for the Division of Lyne § 1954

1954 Australian federal election: Lyne
Party	Candidate	Votes	%	±%
Country	Philip Lucock	21,388	53.5	−12.0
Independent	Donald Lancaster	16,518	41.3	+41.3
Independent	Joe Cordner	2,051	5.1	+3.0
Total formal votes		39,957	98.7	
Informal votes		514	1.3	
Turnout		40,471	97.0	
Two-party-preferred result
Country	Philip Lucock		55.6	−13.2
Independent	Donald Lancaster		44.4	+44.4
Country hold		Swing	−13.2	

=== Macarthur ===
This section is an excerpt from Electoral results for the Division of Macarthur § 1954

1954 Australian federal election: Macarthur
Party	Candidate	Votes	%	±%
Liberal	Jeff Bate	25,297	57.6	−6.2
Labor	Claude Allen	18,643	42.4	+6.2
Total formal votes		43,940	98.8	
Informal votes		517	1.2	
Turnout		44,457	96.2	
Liberal hold		Swing	−6.2	

=== Mackellar ===
This section is an excerpt from Electoral results for the Division of Mackellar § 1954

1954 Australian federal election: Mackellar
Party	Candidate	Votes	%	±%
Liberal	Bill Wentworth	28,546	59.8	−3.3
Labor	Francis Neate	17,072	35.8	−1.1
Communist	Ray Clarke	2,120	4.4	+4.4
Total formal votes		47,738	98.7	
Informal votes		650	1.3	
Turnout		48,388	95.5	
Two-party-preferred result
Liberal	Bill Wentworth		60.2	−2.9
Labor	Francis Neate		39.8	+2.9
Liberal hold		Swing	−2.9	

=== Macquarie ===
This section is an excerpt from Electoral results for the Division of Macquarie § 1954

1954 Australian federal election: Macquarie
Party	Candidate	Votes	%	±%
Labor	Tony Luchetti	22,388	60.4	−1.4
Liberal	Horace Brownlow	13,484	36.3	−1.9
Communist	John King	1,224	3.3	+3.3
Total formal votes		37,096	99.1	
Informal votes		340	0.9	
Turnout		37,436	97.1	
Two-party-preferred result
Labor	Tony Luchetti		63.5	+1.7
Liberal	Horace Brownlow		36.5	−1.7
Labor hold		Swing	+1.7	

=== Martin ===
This section is an excerpt from Electoral results for the Division of Martin § 1954

1954 Australian federal election: Martin
Party	Candidate	Votes	%	±%
Labor	William O'Connor	21,430	59.1	+5.2
Liberal	Elton Lewis	13,708	37.8	+0.4
Communist	Ernie Thornton	1,134	3.1	−3.2
Total formal votes		36,272	98.7	
Informal votes		466	1.3	
Turnout		36,738	97.1	
Two-party-preferred result
Labor	William O'Connor		61.9	+1.1
Liberal	Elton Lewis		38.1	−1.1
Labor hold		Swing	+1.1	

=== Mitchell ===
This section is an excerpt from Electoral results for the Division of Mitchell § 1954

1954 Australian federal election: Mitchell
Party	Candidate	Votes	%	±%
Liberal	Roy Wheeler	24,391	50.1	−3.7
Labor	Doug Bowd	23,151	47.5	+6.4
Communist	Mel McCalman	1,186	2.4	−2.6
Total formal votes		48,728	98.7	
Informal votes		661	1.3	
Turnout		49,389	95.8	
Two-party-preferred result
Liberal	Roy Wheeler		50.3	−5.0
Labor	Doug Bowd		49.7	+5.0
Liberal hold		Swing	−5.0	

=== New England ===
This section is an excerpt from Electoral results for the Division of New England § 1954

1954 Australian federal election: New England
Party	Candidate	Votes	%	±%
Country	David Drummond	21,852	57.1	−0.8
Labor	Frederick Cowley	16,444	42.9	+0.8
Total formal votes		38,296	99.1	
Informal votes		356	0.9	
Turnout		38,652	96.4	
Country hold		Swing	−0.8	

=== Newcastle ===
This section is an excerpt from Electoral results for the Division of Newcastle1954

1954 Australian federal election: Newcastle
Party	Candidate	Votes	%	±%
Labor	David Watkins	20,854	57.8	−2.7
Liberal	Matthew Tapp	14,011	38.8	+3.6
Communist	Doug Olive	716	2.0	−2.3
Independent	Sidney Monroe	490	1.4	+1.4
Total formal votes		36,071	98.9	
Informal votes		384	1.1	
Turnout		36,445	96.8	
Two-party-preferred result
Labor	David Watkins		59.8	−3.6
Liberal	Matthew Tapp		40.2	+3.6
Labor hold		Swing	−3.6	

=== North Sydney ===
This section is an excerpt from Electoral results for the Division of North Sydney § 1954

1954 Australian federal election: North Sydney
Party	Candidate	Votes	%	±%
Liberal	William Jack	19,780	53.9	−4.1
Labor	Leo Haylen	16,916	46.1	+4.1
Total formal votes		36,696	98.7	
Informal votes		486	1.3	
Turnout		37,182	95.7	
Liberal hold		Swing	−4.1	

=== Parkes ===
This section is an excerpt from Electoral results for the Division of Parkes (1901–1969) § 1954

1954 Australian federal election: Parkes
Party	Candidate	Votes	%	±%
Labor	Les Haylen	19,307	56.0	+5.1
Liberal	William Ness	15,173	44.0	−5.1
Total formal votes		34,480	98.7	
Informal votes		466	1.3	
Turnout		34,946	96.4	
Labor hold		Swing	+5.1	

=== Parramatta ===
This section is an excerpt from Electoral results for the Division of Parramatta § 1954

1954 Australian federal election: Parramatta
Party	Candidate	Votes	%	±%
Liberal	Howard Beale	27,941	59.8	−3.7
Labor	John Holmes	18,760	40.2	+3.7
Total formal votes		46,701	98.9	
Informal votes		500	1.1	
Turnout		47,201	95.8	
Liberal hold		Swing	−3.7	

=== Paterson ===
This section is an excerpt from Electoral results for the Division of Paterson § 1954

1954 Australian federal election: Paterson
Party	Candidate	Votes	%	±%
Liberal	Allen Fairhall	21,870	54.5	−2.6
Labor	Kevin Barlow	18,255	45.5	+2.6
Total formal votes		40,125	99.0	
Informal votes		422	1.0	
Turnout		40,547	96.9	
Liberal hold		Swing	−2.6	

=== Phillip ===
This section is an excerpt from Electoral results for the Division of Phillip § 1954

1954 Australian federal election: Phillip
Party	Candidate	Votes	%	±%
Labor	Joe Fitzgerald	19,826	58.9	+5.5
Liberal	Henry Clarke	13,849	41.1	−5.5
Total formal votes		33,675	98.5	
Informal votes		519	1.5	
Turnout		40,547	96.9	
Labor hold		Swing	+5.5	

=== Reid ===
This section is an excerpt from Electoral results for the Division of Reid § 1954

1954 Australian federal election: Reid
Party	Candidate	Votes	%	±%
Labor	Charles Morgan	32,958	63.4	+1.0
Liberal	Bob Mutton	13,425	25.8	−7.6
Official Labour Movement	Horace Hancock	3,348	6.4	+6.4
Communist	Laurie Aarons	2,285	4.4	+4.4
Total formal votes		52,016	98.0	
Informal votes		1,047	2.0	
Turnout		53,063	96.1	
Two-party-preferred result
Labor	Charles Morgan		70.8	+5.2
Liberal	Bob Mutton		29.2	−5.2
Labor hold		Swing	+5.2	

=== Richmond ===
This section is an excerpt from Electoral results for the Division of Richmond § 1954

1954 Australian federal election: Richmond
Party	Candidate	Votes	%	±%
Country	Larry Anthony	unopposed		
Country hold		Swing		

=== Riverina ===
This section is an excerpt from Electoral results for the Division of Riverina § 1954

1954 Australian federal election: Riverina
Party	Candidate	Votes	%	±%
Country	Hugh Roberton	20,341	52.2	−1.1
Labor	Michael Sheehan	17,646	45.3	+2.3
Communist	Les Kelton	951	2.4	−1.3
Total formal votes		38,938	99.1	
Informal votes		355	0.9	
Turnout		39,293	95.8	
Two-party-preferred result
Country	Hugh Roberton		53.4	−1.3
Labor	Michael Sheehan		46.6	+1.3
Country hold		Swing	−1.3	

=== Robertson ===
This section is an excerpt from Electoral results for the Division of Robertson § 1954

1954 Australian federal election: Robertson
Party	Candidate	Votes	%	±%
Liberal	Roger Dean	23,910	49.9	−4.1
Labor	Walter Geraghty	22,895	47.8	+1.8
Communist	John Tapp	1,077	2.2	+2.2
Total formal votes		47,882	99.0	
Informal votes		480	1.0	
Turnout		48,362	96.2	
Two-party-preferred result
Liberal	Roger Dean	24,082	50.3	−3.7
Labor	Walter Geraghty	23,800	49.7	+3.7
Liberal hold		Swing	−3.7	

=== Shortland ===
This section is an excerpt from Electoral results for the Division of Shortland § 1954

1954 Australian federal election: Shortland
Party	Candidate	Votes	%	±%
Labor	Charles Griffiths	27,226	64.4	−0.6
Liberal	Arthur Downey	15,044	35.6	+0.6
Total formal votes		42,270	98.8	
Informal votes		509	1.2	
Turnout		42,779	97.0	
Labor hold		Swing	−0.6	

=== St George ===
This section is an excerpt from Electoral results for the Division of St George § 1954

1954 Australian federal election: St George
Party	Candidate	Votes	%	±%
Labor	Nelson Lemmon	20,173	52.7	+4.3
Liberal	Bill Graham	18,084	47.3	−4.3
Total formal votes		38,257	98.9	
Informal votes		434	1.1	
Turnout		38,691	97.0	
Labor gain from Liberal		Swing	+4.3	

=== Warringah ===
This section is an excerpt from Electoral results for the Division of Warringah § 1954

1954 Australian federal election: Warringah
Party	Candidate	Votes	%	±%
Liberal	Francis Bland	22,218	58.3	−17.4
Labor	Ronald Nibbs	8,548	22.4	−1.9
Independent	Ernest White	7,332	19.2	+19.2
Total formal votes		38,098	98.6	
Informal votes		549	1.4	
Turnout		38,647	95.7	
Two-party-preferred result
Liberal	Francis Bland		67.9	−7.8
Labor	Ronald Nibbs		32.1	+7.8
Liberal hold		Swing	−7.8	

=== Watson ===
This section is an excerpt from Electoral results for the Division of Watson (1934–1969) § 1954

1954 Australian federal election: Watson
Party	Candidate	Votes	%	±%
Labor	Dan Curtin	25,507	63.2	+6.5
Liberal	Hubert O'Connell	14,846	36.8	−6.5
Total formal votes		40,353	98.2	
Informal votes		728	1.8	
Turnout		41,081	96.2	
Labor hold		Swing	+6.5	

=== Wentworth ===
This section is an excerpt from Electoral results for the Division of Wentworth § 1954

1954 Australian federal election: Wentworth
Party	Candidate	Votes	%	±%
Liberal	Sir Eric Harrison	unopposed		
Liberal hold		Swing		

=== Werriwa ===
This section is an excerpt from Electoral results for the Division of Werriwa § 1954

1954 Australian federal election: Werriwa
Party	Candidate	Votes	%	±%
Labor	Gough Whitlam	33,961	57.7	+2.6
Liberal	Jack Lee	22,530	38.3	−6.6
Communist	Edwin Lipscombe	2,363	4.0	+4.0
Total formal votes		58,854	98.4	
Informal votes		943	1.6	
Turnout		59,797	95.5	
Two-party-preferred result
Labor	Gough Whitlam		61.3	+6.2
Liberal	Jack Lee		38.7	−6.2
Labor hold		Swing	+6.2	

=== West Sydney ===
This section is an excerpt from Electoral results for the Division of West Sydney § 1954

1954 Australian federal election: West Sydney
Party	Candidate	Votes	%	±%
Labor	Dan Minogue	21,226	72.5	+9.1
Independent	Anthony Micallef	6,264	21.4	+21.4
Communist	Lance Sharkey	1,776	6.1	−4.3
Total formal votes		29,266	95.3	
Informal votes		1,432	4.7	
Turnout		30,698	93.0	
Two-party-preferred result
Labor	Dan Minogue		78.0	+3.4
Independent	Anthony Micallef		22.0	−3.4
Labor hold		Swing	+3.4	

== Victoria ==
1954 Australian federal election (Victoria)
- 29 May 1954

All 33 Victorian seats in the House of Representatives 17 seats needed for a majority
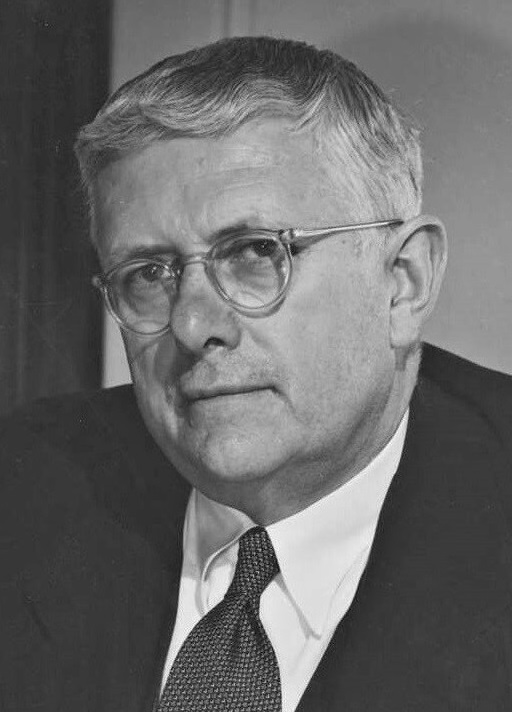

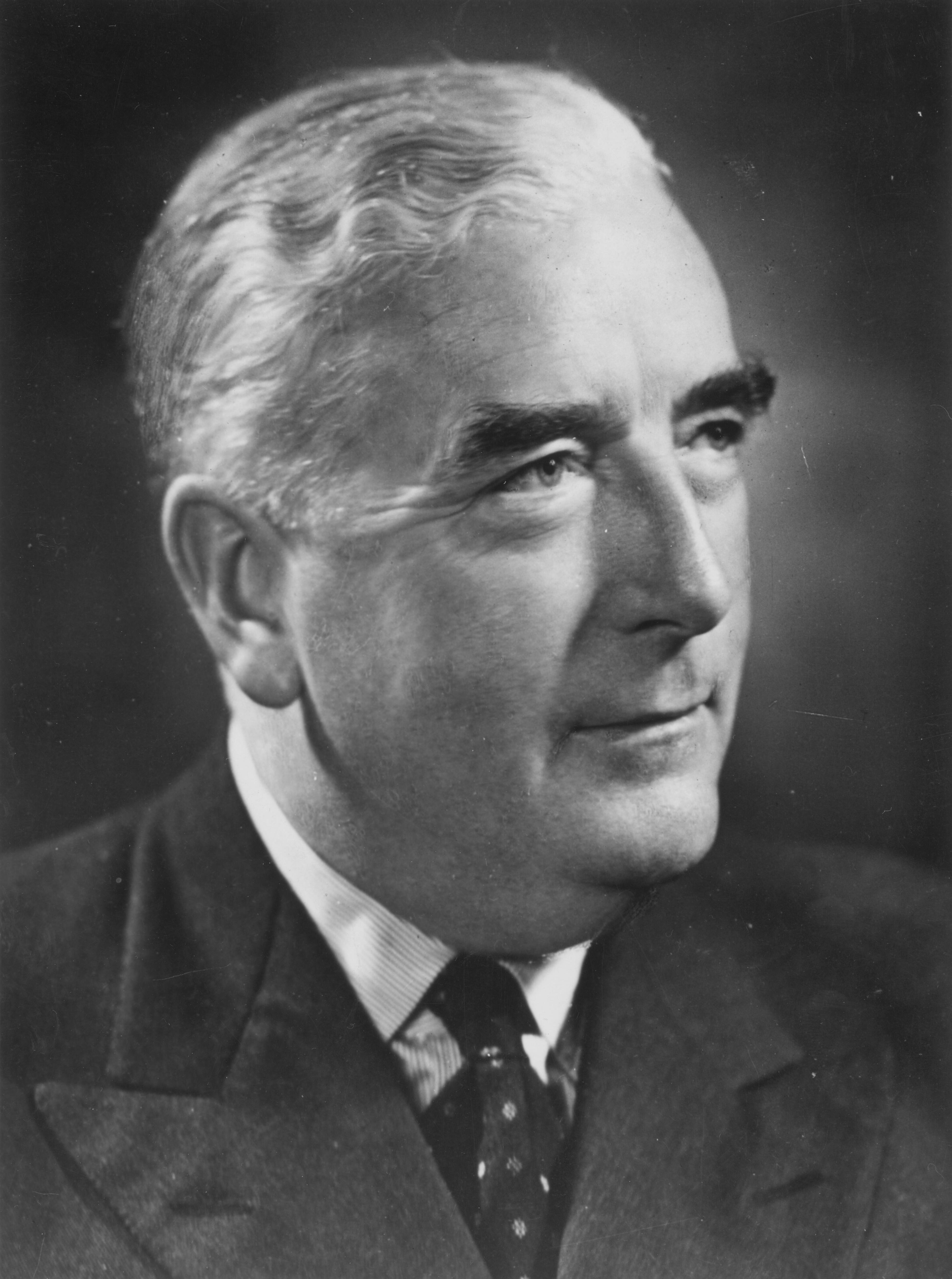
	First party	Second party
Leader	H. V. Evatt	Robert Menzies
Party	Labor	Coalition
Seats before	15	18
Seats won	15	18
Seat change	Steady	Steady
Popular vote	636,911	615,623
Percentage	50.3%	48.6%
Swing	▲1.7pp	▼0.6pp
TPP	50.7%	49.3%
TPP swing	Steady	Steady

=== Balaclava ===
This section is an excerpt from Electoral results for the Division of Balaclava § 1954

1954 Australian federal election: Balaclava
Party	Candidate	Votes	%	±%
Liberal	Percy Joske	25,062	65.2	+1.9
Labor	Leonard Prior	13,365	34.8	−1.9
Total formal votes		38,427	99.1	
Informal votes		364	0.9	
Turnout		38,791	96.2	
Liberal hold		Swing	+1.9	

=== Ballarat ===
This section is an excerpt from Electoral results for the Division of Ballarat § 1954

1954 Australian federal election: Ballaarat
Party	Candidate	Votes	%	±%
Labor	Bob Joshua	20,997	52.6	+1.4
Liberal	Allen Driscoll	18,900	47.4	−1.4
Total formal votes		39,897	99.3	
Informal votes		291	0.7	
Turnout		40,188	97.3	
Labor hold		Swing	+1.4	

=== Batman ===
This section is an excerpt from Electoral results for the Division of Batman § 1954

1954 Australian federal election: Batman
Party	Candidate	Votes	%	±%
Labor	Alan Bird	21,250	57.8	−2.8
Liberal	Neil McKay	14,732	40.1	+0.7
Communist	Andy Wallace	801	2.2	+2.2
Total formal votes		36,783	99.0	
Informal votes		386	1.0	
Turnout		37,169	94.9	
Two-party-preferred result
Labor	Alan Bird		59.8	−0.8
Liberal	Neil McKay		40.2	+0.8
Labor hold		Swing	−0.8	

=== Bendigo ===
This section is an excerpt from Electoral results for the Division of Bendigo § 1954

1954 Australian federal election: Bendigo
Party	Candidate	Votes	%	±%
Labor	Percy Clarey	23,272	55.8	+2.2
Liberal	John Barton	18,448	44.2	−2.2
Total formal votes		41,720	99.2	
Informal votes		352	0.8	
Turnout		42,072	96.6	
Labor hold		Swing	+2.2	

=== Burke ===
This section is an excerpt from Electoral results for the Division of Burke (1949–1955) § 1954

1954 Australian federal election: Burke
Party	Candidate	Votes	%	±%
Labor	Ted Peters	23,510	68.7	−3.7
Liberal	Alfred Wall	9,260	27.0	−0.6
Communist	Vida Little	1,467	4.3	+4.3
Total formal votes		34,237	98.2	
Informal votes		613	1.8	
Turnout		34,850	96.0	
Two-party-preferred result
Labor	Ted Peters		72.6	+0.2
Liberal	Alfred Wall		27.4	−0.2
Labor hold		Swing	+0.2	

=== Chisholm ===
This section is an excerpt from Electoral results for the Division of Chisholm § 1954

1954 Australian federal election: Chisholm
Party	Candidate	Votes	%	±%
Liberal	Wilfrid Kent Hughes	26,775	65.0	+0.0
Labor	Les Cahill	14,390	35.0	−0.0
Total formal votes		41,165	99.1	
Informal votes		387	0.9	
Turnout		41,552	95.7	
Liberal hold		Swing	+0.0	

=== Corangamite ===
This section is an excerpt from Electoral results for the Division of Corangamite § 1954

1954 Australian federal election: Corangamite
Party	Candidate	Votes	%	±%
Liberal	Dan Mackinnon	22,253	57.6	−1.1
Labor	Angus McLean	16,407	42.4	+1.1
Total formal votes		38,660	99.4	
Informal votes		244	0.6	
Turnout		38,904	97.2	
Liberal hold		Swing	−1.1	

=== Corio ===
This section is an excerpt from Electoral results for the Division of Corio § 1954

1954 Australian federal election: Corio
Party	Candidate	Votes	%	±%
Liberal	Hubert Opperman	22,703	51.4	+1.2
Labor	John Dedman	21,487	48.6	−1.2
Total formal votes		44,190	99.3	
Informal votes		308	0.7	
Turnout		44,498	95.7	
Liberal hold		Swing	+1.2	

=== Darebin ===
This section is an excerpt from Electoral results for the Division of Darebin § 1954

1954 Australian federal election: Darebin
Party	Candidate	Votes	%	±%
Labor	Tom Andrews	28,810	65.0	+0.6
Liberal	Charles White	15,534	35.0	−0.6
Total formal votes		44,344	98.7	
Informal votes		598	1.3	
Turnout		44,942	96.7	
Labor hold		Swing	+0.6	

=== Deakin ===
This section is an excerpt from Electoral results for the Division of Deakin § 1954

1954 Australian federal election: Deakin
Party	Candidate	Votes	%	±%
Liberal	Frank Davis	29,886	52.2	+3.6
Labor	Gordon Bryant	27,375	47.8	+1.4
Total formal votes		57,261	99.0	
Informal votes		576	1.0	
Turnout		57,837	96.1	
Liberal hold		Swing	+0.6	

=== Fawkner ===
This section is an excerpt from Electoral results for the Division of Fawkner § 1954

1954 Australian federal election: Fawkner
Party	Candidate	Votes	%	±%
Labor	Bill Bourke	18,038	50.2	−1.4
Liberal	Peter Howson	17,920	49.8	+2.2
Total formal votes		35,958	99.0	
Informal votes		378	1.0	
Turnout		36,336	95.5	
Labor hold		Swing	−1.8	

=== Flinders ===
This section is an excerpt from Electoral results for the Division of Flinders § 1954

1954 Australian federal election: Flinders
Party	Candidate	Votes	%	±%
Liberal	Robert Lindsay	24,235	51.6	−3.2
Labor	Keith Ewert	22,707	48.4	+5.4
Total formal votes		46,942	99.0	
Informal votes		494	1.0	
Turnout		47,436	96.6	
Liberal gain from Labor		Swing	−4.3	

=== Gellibrand ===
This section is an excerpt from Electoral results for the Division of Gellibrand § 1954

1954 Australian federal election: Gellibrand
Party	Candidate	Votes	%	±%
Labor	John Mullens	25,637	66.7	+1.8
Liberal	George Carrington	10,235	26.6	+1.6
Communist	Alex Dobbin	2,584	6.7	−3.3
Total formal votes		38,456	98.5	
Informal votes		605	1.5	
Turnout		39,061	96.3	
Two-party-preferred result
Labor	John Mullens		72.8	−1.6
Liberal	George Carrington		27.2	+1.6
Labor hold		Swing	−1.6	

=== Gippsland ===
This section is an excerpt from Electoral results for the Division of Gippsland § 1954

1954 Australian federal election: Gippsland
Party	Candidate	Votes	%	±%
Country	George Bowden	22,185	60.4	−4.7
Labor	Syd Crofts	14,537	39.6	+4.7
Total formal votes		36,722	99.0	
Informal votes		375	1.0	
Turnout		37,097	95.4	
Country hold		Swing	−4.7	

=== Henty ===
This section is an excerpt from Electoral results for the Division of Henty § 1954

1954 Australian federal election: Henty
Party	Candidate	Votes	%	±%
Liberal	Jo Gullett	22,858	56.6	−0.7
Labor	Alexander Miller	16,400	40.6	−0.2
Independent Liberal	Noel Schafer	1,124	2.8	+2.8
Total formal votes		40,382	99.0	
Informal votes		392	1.0	
Turnout		40,774	96.2	
Two-party-preferred result
Liberal	Jo Gullett		58.0	+0.5
Labor	Alexander Miller		42.0	−0.5
Liberal hold		Swing	+0.5	

=== Higgins ===
This section is an excerpt from Electoral results for the Division of Higgins § 1954

1954 Australian federal election: Higgins
Party	Candidate	Votes	%	±%
Liberal	Harold Holt	22,849	65.4	−1.0
Labor	Benjamin Nicholas	12,108	34.6	+4.1
Total formal votes		34,957	98.8	
Informal votes		407	1.2	
Turnout		35,364	93.8	
Liberal hold		Swing	−2.8	

=== Higinbotham ===
This section is an excerpt from Electoral results for the Division of Higinbotham § 1954

1954 Australian federal election: Higinbotham
Party	Candidate	Votes	%	±%
Liberal	Frank Timson	30,579	54.5	+0.1
Labor	Geoffrey Sowerbutts	25,537	45.5	−0.1
Total formal votes		56,116	99.0	
Informal votes		584	1.0	
Turnout		56,700	96.4	
Liberal hold		Swing	+0.1	

=== Hoddle ===
This section is an excerpt from Electoral results for the Division of Hoddle § 1954

1954 Australian federal election: Hoddle
Party	Candidate	Votes	%	±%
Labor	Jack Cremean	23,439	75.8	−2.9
Liberal	Desmond Byrne	6,302	20.4	+2.8
Communist	John Prescott	1,198	3.9	+0.2
Total formal votes		30,939	97.6	
Informal votes		767	2.4	
Turnout		31,706	94.3	
Two-party-preferred result
Labor	Jack Cremean		79.4	−2.7
Liberal	Desmond Byrne		20.6	+2.7
Labor hold		Swing	−2.7	

=== Indi ===
This section is an excerpt from Electoral results for the Division of Indi § 1954

1954 Australian federal election: Indi
Party	Candidate	Votes	%	±%
Liberal	William Bostock	17,199	44.3	−14.3
Labor	Carl Reeves	14,423	37.1	−4.3
Country	Cyril Davy	7,231	18.6	+18.6
Total formal votes		38,853	99.3	
Informal votes		291	0.7	
Turnout		39,144	95.2	
Two-party-preferred result
Liberal	William Bostock	23,492	60.5	+1.9
Labor	Carl Reeves	15,361	39.5	−1.9
Liberal hold		Swing	+1.9	

=== Isaacs ===
This section is an excerpt from Electoral results for the Division of Isaacs (1949–1969) § 1954

1954 Australian federal election: Isaacs
Party	Candidate	Votes	%	±%
Liberal	William Haworth	19,315	55.9	+4.4
Labor	Don MacSween	15,240	44.1	+1.5
Total formal votes		34,555	98.6	
Informal votes		504	1.4	
Turnout		35,059	95.1	
Liberal hold		Swing	+3.8	

=== Kooyong ===
This section is an excerpt from Electoral results for the Division of Kooyong § 1954

1954 Australian federal election: Kooyong
Party	Candidate	Votes	%	±%
Liberal	Robert Menzies	29,427	69.3	+1.9
Labor	George Miller	12,269	28.9	+0.5
Communist	Rex Mortimer	763	1.8	−2.4
Total formal votes		42,459	99.1	
Informal votes		398	0.9	
Turnout		42,857	95.7	
Two-party-preferred result
Liberal	Robert Menzies		69.5	+0.7
Labor	George Miller		30.5	−0.7
Liberal hold		Swing	+0.7	

=== La Trobe ===
This section is an excerpt from Electoral results for the Division of La Trobe § 1954

1954 Australian federal election: La Trobe
Party	Candidate	Votes	%	±%
Liberal	Richard Casey	34,585	55.1	−2.9
Labor	Edward Smith	26,943	42.9	+0.9
Communist	Gerry O'Day	1,227	2.0	+2.0
Total formal votes		62,755	98.9	
Informal votes		699	1.1	
Turnout		63,454	96.5	
Two-party-preferred result
Liberal	Richard Casey		55.3	−2.7
Labor	Edward Smith		44.7	+2.7
Liberal hold		Swing	−2.7	

=== Lalor ===
This section is an excerpt from Electoral results for the Division of Lalor § 1954

1954 Australian federal election: Lalor
Party	Candidate	Votes	%	±%
Labor	Reg Pollard	30,232	58.3	+3.4
Liberal	George Morison	21,598	41.7	−3.4
Total formal votes		51,830	98.8	
Informal votes		629	1.2	
Turnout		52,459	95.6	
Labor hold		Swing	+3.4	

=== Mallee ===
This section is an excerpt from Electoral results for the Division of Mallee § 1954

1954 Australian federal election: Mallee
Party	Candidate	Votes	%	±%
Country	Winton Turnbull	unopposed		
Country hold		Swing		

=== Maribyrnong ===
This section is an excerpt from Electoral results for the Division of Maribyrnong § 1954

1954 Australian federal election: Maribyrnong
Party	Candidate	Votes	%	±%
Labor	Arthur Drakeford	27,647	64.2	−0.1
Liberal	Stuart Collie	14,502	33.7	−2.0
Communist	Frank Johnson	889	2.1	+2.1
Total formal votes		43,038	98.7	
Informal votes		553	1.3	
Turnout		43,591	95.8	
Two-party-preferred result
Labor	Arthur Drakeford		66.1	+1.8
Liberal	Stuart Collie		33.9	−1.8
Labor hold		Swing	+1.8	

=== McMillan ===
This section is an excerpt from Electoral results for the Division of McMillan § 1954

1954 Australian federal election: McMillan
Party	Candidate	Votes	%	±%
Labor	Desmond Devlin	17,989	43.2	+2.4
Liberal	Geoffrey Brown	17,054	41.0	−14.7
Country	John McDonald	5,790	13.9	+13.9
Communist	Bob Hamilton	776	1.9	−1.5
Total formal votes		41,609	98.4	
Informal votes		694	1.6	
Turnout		42,303	95.2	
Two-party-preferred result
Liberal	Geoffrey Brown	22,314	53.6	−2.4
Labor	Desmond Devlin	19,295	46.4	+2.4
Liberal hold		Swing	−2.4	

=== Melbourne ===
This section is an excerpt from Electoral results for the Division of Melbourne § 1954

1954 Australian federal election: Melbourne
Party	Candidate	Votes	%	±%
Labor	Arthur Calwell	22,125	70.6	+7.6
Liberal	Alfred Carter	9,192	29.4	−3.7
Total formal votes		31,317	97.6	
Informal votes		776	2.4	
Turnout		32,093	94.3	
Labor hold		Swing	+4.0	

=== Melbourne Ports ===
This section is an excerpt from Electoral results for the Division of Melbourne Ports § 1954

1954 Australian federal election: Melbourne Ports
Party	Candidate	Votes	%	±%
Labor	Frank Crean	22,001	67.4	−3.8
Liberal	Norman Fittock	8,914	27.3	−1.5
Communist	Ted Bull	1,733	5.3	+5.3
Total formal votes		32,648	98.0	
Informal votes		677	2.0	
Turnout		33,325	95.2	
Two-party-preferred result
Labor	Frank Crean		72.3	+1.1
Liberal	Norman Fittock		27.7	−1.1
Labor hold		Swing	+1.1	

=== Murray ===
This section is an excerpt from Electoral results for the Division of Murray § 1954

1954 Australian federal election: Murray
Party	Candidate	Votes	%	±%
Country	John McEwen	unopposed		
Country hold		Swing		

=== Wannon ===
This section is an excerpt from Electoral results for the Division of Wannon § 1954

1954 Australian federal election: Wannon
Party	Candidate	Votes	%	±%
Labor	Don McLeod	18,509	50.02	−1.1
Liberal	Malcolm Fraser	18,492	49.98	+1.1
Total formal votes		37,001	100	
Informal votes		186	0.5	
Turnout		37,187	97.1	
Labor hold		Swing	−1.1	

=== Wills ===
This section is an excerpt from Electoral results for the Division of Wills § 1954

1954 Australian federal election: Wills
Party	Candidate	Votes	%	±%
Labor	Bill Bryson	27,538	62.4	+13.5
Liberal	Ian Ingram	16,595	37.6	+4.1
Total formal votes		44,133	98.7	
Informal votes		590	1.3	
Turnout		44,723	96.4	
Labor hold		Swing	+0.6	

=== Wimmera ===
This section is an excerpt from Electoral results for the Division of Wimmera § 1954

1954 Australian federal election: Wimmera
Party	Candidate	Votes	%	±%
Liberal	William Lawrence	15,238	43.4	−19.6
Labor	Cyril Sudholz	11,671	33.3	−3.7
Country	Herbert Hilton	8,184	23.3	+23.3
Total formal votes		35,093	99.4	
Informal votes		201	0.6	
Turnout		35,294	96.7	
Two-party-preferred result
Liberal	William Lawrence	22,686	64.6	+1.6
Labor	Cyril Sudholz	12,407	35.4	−1.6
Liberal hold		Swing	+1.6	

=== Yarra ===
This section is an excerpt from Electoral results for the Division of Yarra § 1954

1954 Australian federal election: Yarra
Party	Candidate	Votes	%	±%
Labor	Stan Keon	21,058	62.3	+2.2
Liberal	Jim MacDonald	11,591	34.3	−1.4
Communist	Ken Miller	1,139	3.4	−0.8
Total formal votes		33,788	98.3	
Informal votes		578	1.7	
Turnout		34,366	95.3	
Two-party-preferred result
Labor	Stan Keon		65.4	+1.5
Liberal	Jim MacDonald		34.6	−1.5
Labor hold		Swing	+1.5	

== Queensland ==
1954 Australian federal election (Queensland)
- 29 May 1954

All 18 Queensland seats in the House of Representatives 9 seats needed for a majority
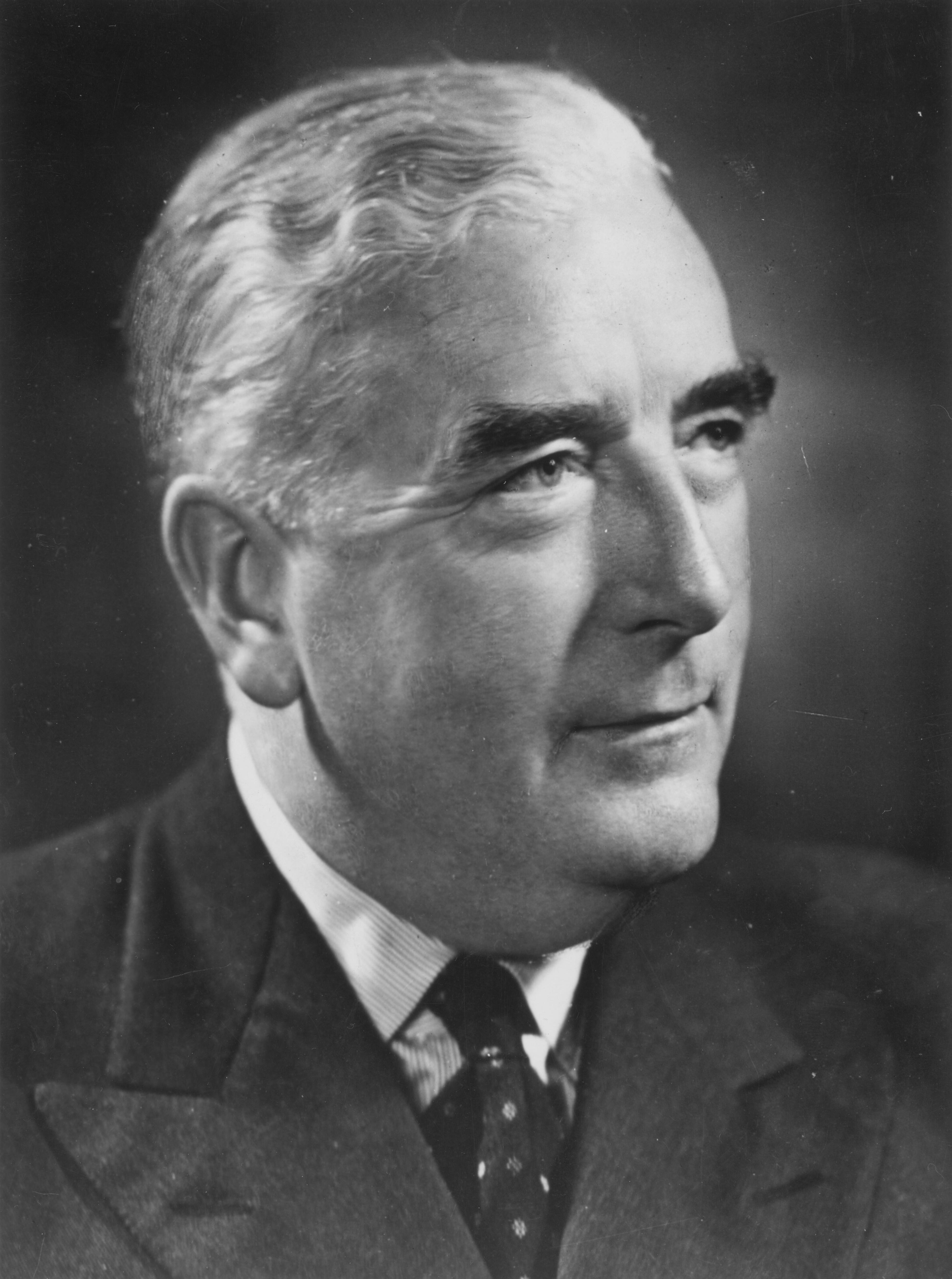

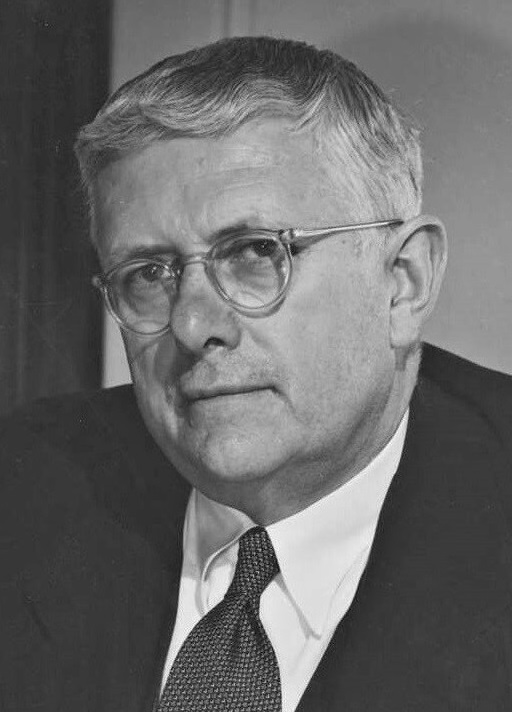
	First party	Second party
Leader	Robert Menzies	H. V. Evatt
Party	Coalition	Labor
Seats before	14	4
Seats won	13	5
Seat change	▼1	▲1
Popular vote	375,814	295,424
Percentage	54.0%	42.5%
Swing	▼0.7pp	▲0.2pp
TPP	55.2%	44.8%
TPP swing	▼1.3pp	▲1.3pp

=== Bowman ===
This section is an excerpt from Electoral results for the Division of Bowman § 1954

1954 Australian federal election: Bowman
Party	Candidate	Votes	%	±%
Liberal	Malcolm McColm	22,839	53.3	−0.8
Labor	Jack Houston	18,980	44.3	+2.3
Communist	Mabel Hanson	1,069	2.5	−1.4
Total formal votes		42,888	98.9	
Informal votes		479	1.1	
Turnout		43,367	96.6	
Two-party-preferred result
Liberal	Malcolm McColm		53.4	−2.2
Labor	Jack Houston		46.6	+2.2
Liberal hold		Swing	−2.2	

=== Brisbane ===
This section is an excerpt from Electoral results for the Division of Brisbane § 1954

1954 Australian federal election: Brisbane
Party	Candidate	Votes	%	±%
Labor	George Lawson	16,964	56.2	+2.6
Liberal	Vic Mead	12,446	41.2	+1.2
Communist	Max Julius	773	2.6	−3.8
Total formal votes		30,183	98.2	
Informal votes		552	1.8	
Turnout		30,735	94.6	
Two-party-preferred result
Labor	George Lawson		58.5	−1.0
Liberal	Vic Mead		41.5	+1.0
Labor hold		Swing	−1.0	

=== Capricornia ===
This section is an excerpt from Electoral results for the Division of Capricornia § 1954

1954 Australian federal election: Capricornia
Party	Candidate	Votes	%	±%
Liberal	Henry Pearce	18,234	54.9	+3.0
Labor	Mick Gardner	14,318	43.1	−5.0
Communist	Eric Browne	664	2.0	+2.0
Total formal votes		33,216	98.7	
Informal votes		444	1.3	
Turnout		33,660	97.3	
Two-party-preferred result
Liberal	Henry Pearce		55.1	+3.2
Labor	Mick Gardner		44.9	−3.2
Liberal hold		Swing	+3.2	

=== Darling Downs ===
This section is an excerpt from Electoral results for the Division of Darling Downs § 1954

1954 Australian federal election: Darling Downs
Party	Candidate	Votes	%	±%
Liberal	Reginald Swartz	24,801	65.0	−35.0
Labor	William Watson	13,331	35.0	+35.0
Total formal votes		38,132	99.3	
Informal votes		267	0.7	
Turnout		38,399	96.6	
Liberal hold		Swing	−35.0	

=== Dawson ===
This section is an excerpt from Electoral results for the Division of Dawson § 1954

1954 Australian federal election: Dawson
Party	Candidate	Votes	%	±%
Country	Charles Davidson	19,828	55.6	−0.7
Labor	George Hyde	15,802	44.4	+0.7
Total formal votes		35,630	99.0	
Informal votes		354	1.0	
Turnout		35,984	96.4	
Country hold		Swing	−0.7	

=== Fisher ===
This section is an excerpt from Electoral results for the Division of Fisher § 1954

1954 Australian federal election: Fisher
Party	Candidate	Votes	%	±%
Country	Charles Adermann	29,202	69.6	−3.3
Labor	Sydney Campbell	12,774	30.4	+3.3
Total formal votes		41,976	99.2	
Informal votes		357	0.8	
Turnout		42,333	97.3	
Country hold		Swing	−3.3	

=== Griffith ===
This section is an excerpt from Electoral results for the Division of Griffith § 1954

1954 Australian federal election: Griffith
Party	Candidate	Votes	%	±%
Labor	Wilfred Coutts	16,003	50.4	+4.1
Liberal	Doug Berry	15,768	49.6	−4.1
Total formal votes		31,771	99.0	
Informal votes		320	1.0	
Turnout		32,091	96.2	
Labor gain from Liberal		Swing	+4.1	

=== Herbert ===
This section is an excerpt from Electoral results for the Division of Herbert § 1954

1954 Australian federal election: Herbert
Party	Candidate	Votes	%	±%
Labor	Bill Edmonds	20,894	55.8	+1.7
Country	Fred Purdie	15,239	40.7	−2.0
Communist	Claude Jones	1,323	3.5	+0.3
Total formal votes		37,456	98.2	
Informal votes		684	1.8	
Turnout		38,140	95.3	
Two-party-preferred result
Labor	Bill Edmonds		59.0	+2.0
Country	Fred Purdie		41.0	−2.0
Labor hold		Swing	+2.0	

=== Kennedy ===
This section is an excerpt from Electoral results for the Division of Kennedy § 1954

1954 Australian federal election: Kennedy
Party	Candidate	Votes	%	±%
Labor	Bill Riordan	17,585	60.2	+0.0
Country	Cliff Lanham	11,650	39.8	+0.0
Total formal votes		29,235	98.9	
Informal votes		332	1.1	
Turnout		29,567	92.6	
Labor hold		Swing	+0.0	

=== Leichhardt ===
This section is an excerpt from Electoral results for the Division of Leichhardt § 1954

1954 Australian federal election: Leichhardt
Party	Candidate	Votes	%	±%
Labor	Harry Bruce	19,044	51.4	+2.4
Country	Tom Gilmore	17,276	46.6	−0.5
Communist	Joe Howe	727	2.0	−1.9
Total formal votes		37,047	98.5	
Informal votes		576	1.5	
Turnout		37,623	94.7	
Two-party-preferred result
Labor	Harry Bruce		53.2	+0.5
Country	Tom Gilmore		46.8	−0.5
Labor hold		Swing	+0.5	

=== Lilley ===
This section is an excerpt from Electoral results for the Division of Lilley § 1954

1954 Australian federal election: Lilley
Party	Candidate	Votes	%	±%
Liberal	Bruce Wight	24,777	58.2	+0.4
Labor	Bernard Williams	17,824	41.8	+3.9
Total formal votes		42,601	98.7	
Informal votes		557	1.3	
Turnout		43,158	94.8	
Liberal hold		Swing	−0.7	

=== Maranoa ===
This section is an excerpt from Electoral results for the Division of Maranoa § 1954

1954 Australian federal election: Maranoa
Party	Candidate	Votes	%	±%
Country	Wilfred Brimblecombe	14,323	42.3	+9.9
Labor	Eric Taylor	13,649	40.3	+2.6
Independent	Charles Russell	5,906	17.4	−12.5
Total formal votes		33,878	99.3	
Informal votes		230	0.7	
Turnout		34,108	94.3	
Two-party-preferred result
Country	Wilfred Brimblecombe	18,364	54.2	−2.6
Labor	Eric Taylor	15,514	45.8	+2.6
Country hold		Swing	−2.6	

=== McPherson ===
This section is an excerpt from Electoral results for the Division of McPherson § 1954

1954 Australian federal election: McPherson
Party	Candidate	Votes	%	±%
Country	Sir Arthur Fadden	22,397	65.3	−9.6
Independent Democrat	Sir Raphael Cilento	11,905	34.7	+34.7
Total formal votes		34,302	99.0	
Informal votes		350	1.0	
Turnout		34,652	96.1	
Country hold		Swing	−9.6	

=== Moreton ===
This section is an excerpt from Electoral results for the Division of Moreton § 1954

1954 Australian federal election: Moreton
Party	Candidate	Votes	%	±%
Liberal	Josiah Francis	30,873	55.7	−3.8
Labor	Ted Mansfield	23,657	42.6	+3.9
Communist	Bill Yarrow	946	1.7	−0.1
Total formal votes		55,476	98.8	
Informal votes		633	1.1	
Turnout		56,109	96.3	
Two-party-preferred result
Liberal	Josiah Francis		55.9	−3.8
Labor	Ted Mansfield		44.1	+3.8
Liberal hold		Swing	−3.8	

=== Oxley ===
This section is an excerpt from Electoral results for the Division of Oxley § 1954

1954 Australian federal election: Oxley
Party	Candidate	Votes	%	±%
Liberal	Donald Cameron	20,822	55.8	−2.4
Labor	Norman Thomas	15,663	42.0	+1.8
Communist	Tom Millar	841	2.3	+0.6
Total formal votes		37,326	99.3	
Informal votes		273	0.7	
Turnout		37,599	97.3	
Two-party-preferred result
Liberal	Donald Cameron		56.0	−2.4
Labor	Norman Thomas		44.0	+2.4
Liberal hold		Swing	−2.4	

=== Petrie ===
This section is an excerpt from Electoral results for the Division of Petrie § 1954

1954 Australian federal election: Petrie
Party	Candidate	Votes	%	±%
Liberal	Alan Hulme	26,706	55.1	−3.5
Labor	Alexander Barry	21,774	44.9	+3.5
Total formal votes		48,480	98.9	
Informal votes		561	1.1	
Turnout		49,041	96.8	
Liberal hold		Swing	−3.5	

=== Ryan ===
This section is an excerpt from Electoral results for the Division of Ryan § 1954

1954 Australian federal election: Ryan
Party	Candidate	Votes	%	±%
Liberal	Nigel Drury	26,140	58.5	−2.4
Labor	Frank Luton	18,514	41.5	+2.4
Total formal votes		44,654	99.0	
Informal votes		439	1.0	
Turnout		45,093	95.7	
Liberal hold		Swing	−2.4	

=== Wide Bay ===
This section is an excerpt from Electoral results for the Division of Wide Bay § 1954

1954 Australian federal election: Wide Bay
Party	Candidate	Votes	%	±%
Country	William Brand	22,493	54.1	−2.8
Labor	Frank Forde	18,648	44.8	+1.7
Communist	Frank Falls	442	1.1	+1.1
Total formal votes		41,583	99.1	
Informal votes		379	0.9	
Turnout		41,962	97.4	
Two-party-preferred result
Country	William Brand		54.2	−2.7
Labor	Frank Forde		45.8	+2.7
Country hold		Swing	−2.7	

== South Australia ==
1954 Australian federal election (South Australia)
- 29 May 1954

All 10 SA seats in the House of Representatives 5 seats needed for a majority
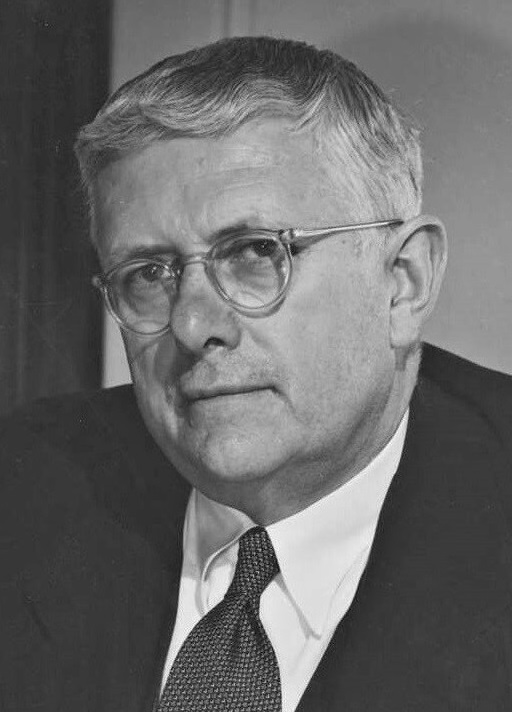

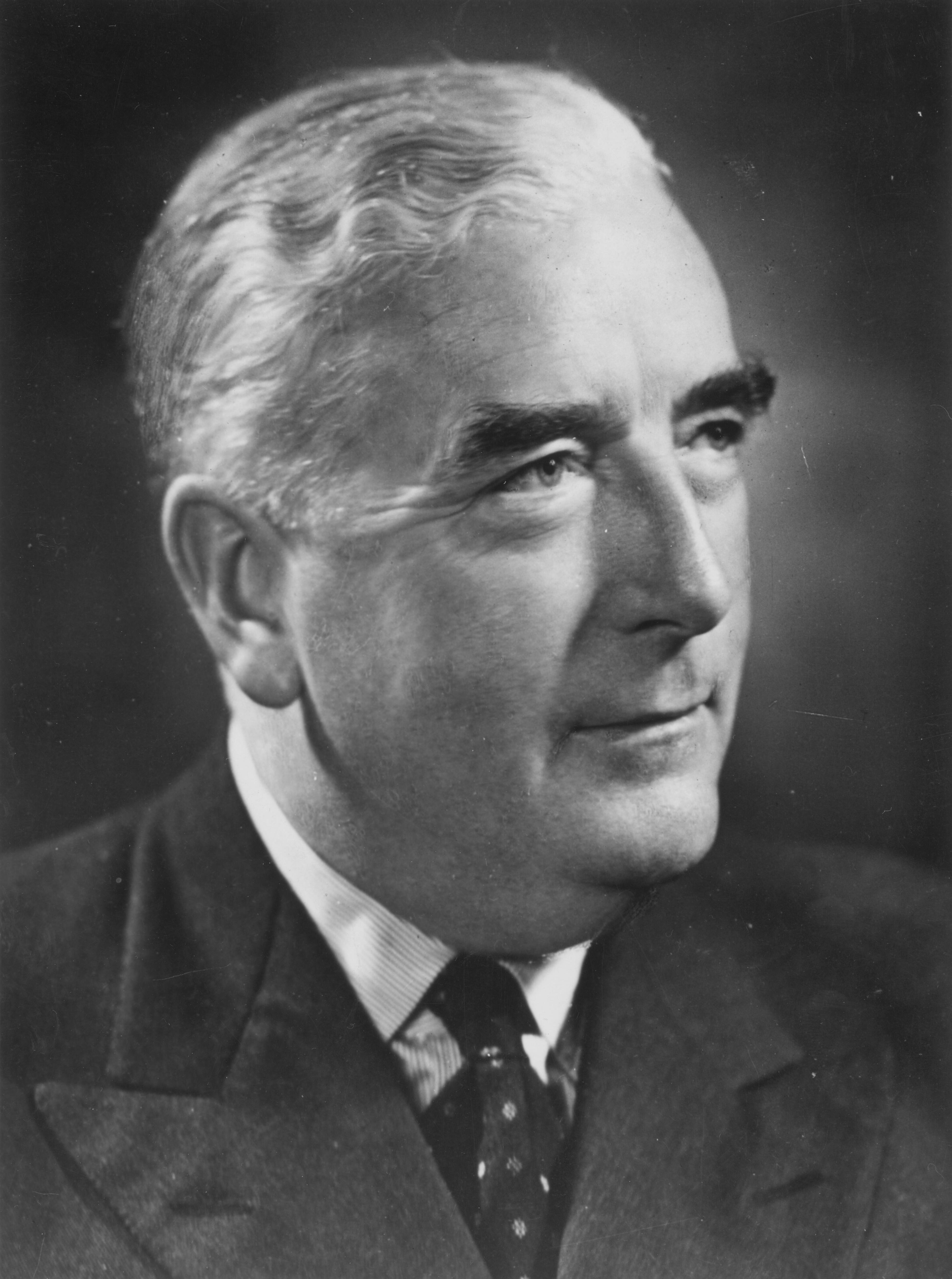
	First party	Second party
Leader	H. V. Evatt	Robert Menzies
Party	Labor	Coalition
Seats before	5	5
Seats won	6	4
Seat change	▲1	▼1
TPP	52.7%	47.3%
TPP swing	▲0.9pp	▼0.9pp

- The first-preference vote is not shown here due to the fact that two members (one Labor and one Liberal) were elected unopposed, along with one seat where the Labor candidate was only opposed by the Communist Party and won over 94% of the vote. Therefore, the Labor vote is overstated.

=== Adelaide ===
This section is an excerpt from Electoral results for the Division of Adelaide § 1954

1954 Australian federal election: Adelaide
Party	Candidate	Votes	%	±%
Labor	Cyril Chambers	18,446	55.3	−6.5
Liberal	Nancy Buttfield	14,266	42.8	+4.5
Communist	Charles McCaffrey	625	1.9	+0.0
Total formal votes		33,337	98.1	
Informal votes		655	1.9	
Turnout		33,992	96.2	
Two-party-preferred result
Labor	Cyril Chambers		57.0	−4.6
Liberal	Nancy Buttfield		43.0	+4.6
Labor hold		Swing	−4.6	

=== Angas ===
This section is an excerpt from Electoral results for the Division of Angas (1949–1977) § 1949

1954 Australian federal election: Angas
Party	Candidate	Votes	%	±%
Liberal	Alick Downer	unopposed		
Liberal hold		Swing		

=== Barker ===
This section is an excerpt from Electoral results for the Division of Barker § 1954

1954 Australian federal election: Barker
Party	Candidate	Votes	%	±%
Liberal	Archie Cameron	27,255	62.9	+1.5
Labor	Ralph Dettman	16,107	37.1	+0.9
Total formal votes		43,362	98.4	
Informal votes		706	1.6	
Turnout		44,068	97.0	
Liberal hold		Swing	+0.2	

=== Boothby ===
This section is an excerpt from Electoral results for the Division of Boothby § 1954

1954 Australian federal election: Boothby
Party	Candidate	Votes	%	±%
Liberal	John McLeay	22,263	58.3	−2.8
Labor	Rex Mathews	15,930	41.7	+2.8
Total formal votes		38,193	98.5	
Informal votes		589	1.5	
Turnout		38,782	96.7	
Liberal hold		Swing	−2.8	

=== Grey ===
This section is an excerpt from Electoral results for the Division of Grey § 1954

1954 Australian federal election: Grey
Party	Candidate	Votes	%	±%
Labor	Edgar Russell	22,749	58.3	+2.2
Liberal	Thomas Cheesman	16,253	41.7	−2.2
Total formal votes		39,002	98.4	
Informal votes		622	1.6	
Turnout		39,624	96.2	
Labor hold		Swing	+2.2	

=== Hindmarsh ===
This section is an excerpt from Electoral results for the Division of Hindmarsh § 1954

1954 Australian federal election: Hindmarsh
Party	Candidate	Votes	%	±%
Labor	Clyde Cameron	unopposed		
Labor hold		Swing		

=== Kingston ===
This section is an excerpt from Electoral results for the Division of Kingston § 1954

1954 Australian federal election: Kingston
Party	Candidate	Votes	%	±%
Labor	Pat Galvin	31,602	55.0	+4.4
Liberal	Howard Zelling	25,88	45.0	−3.1
Total formal votes		57,490	98.6	
Informal votes		830	1.4	
Turnout		58,320	97.1	
Labor hold		Swing	+3.2	

=== Port Adelaide ===
This section is an excerpt from Electoral results for the Division of Port Adelaide § 1954

1954 Australian federal election: Port Adelaide
Party	Candidate	Votes	%	±%
Labor	Albert Thompson	47,355	94.0	+22.7
Communist	Alan Finger	3,045	6.0	+3.3
Total formal votes		50,400	92.5	
Informal votes		4,083	7.5	
Turnout		54,483	96.2	
Labor hold		Swing	+20.2	

=== Sturt ===
This section is an excerpt from Electoral results for the Division of Sturt § 1954

1954 Australian federal election: Sturt
Party	Candidate	Votes	%	±%
Labor	Norman Makin	25,857	53.0	+5.4
Liberal	Keith Wilson	22,890	47.0	−5.4
Total formal votes		48,747	98.5	
Informal votes		729	1.5	
Turnout		49,476	97.1	
Labor gain from Liberal		Swing	+5.4	

=== Wakefield ===
This section is an excerpt from Electoral results for the Division of Wakefield § 1954

1954 Australian federal election: Wakefield
Party	Candidate	Votes	%	±%
Liberal	Sir Philip McBride	21,893	56.8	+3.3
Labor	Edward Harradine	14,400	37.4	−2.5
Independent	Hector Henstridge	2,218	5.8	+5.8
Total formal votes		38,511	98.5	
Informal votes		598	1.5	
Turnout		39,109	97.5	
Two-party-preferred result
Liberal	Sir Philip McBride		59.7	−0.4
Labor	Edward Harradine		40.3	+0.4
Liberal hold		Swing	−0.4	

== Western Australia ==
1954 Australian federal election (Western Australia)
- 29 May 1954

All 8 WA seats in the House of Representatives 4 seats needed for a majority
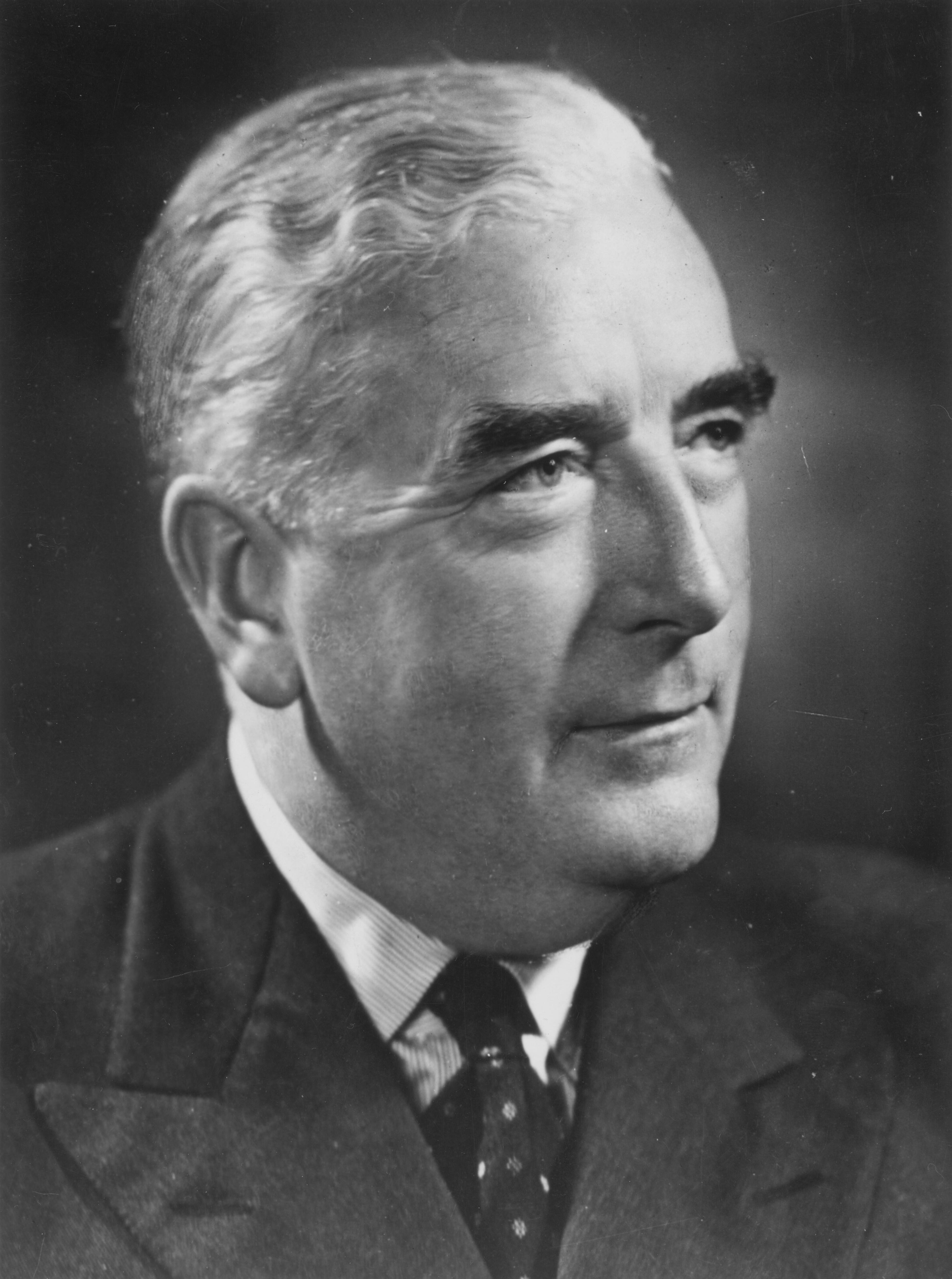

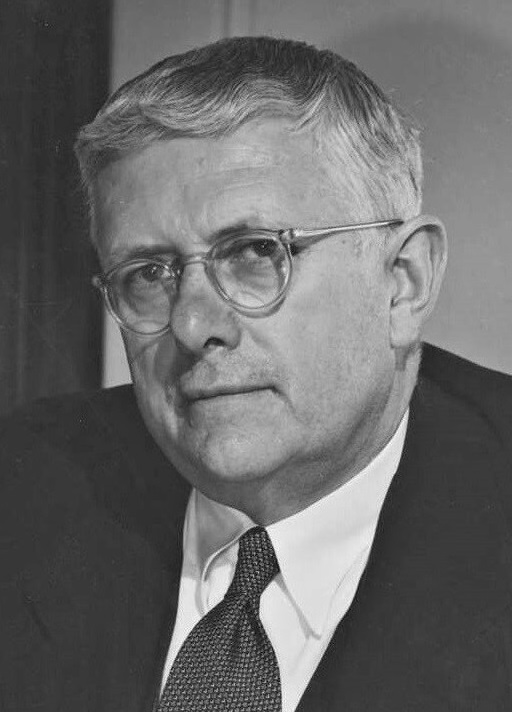
	First party	Second party
Leader	Robert Menzies	H. V. Evatt
Party	Coalition	Labor
Seats before	5	3
Seats won	4	4
Seat change	▼1	▲1
Popular vote	163,522	150,197
Percentage	51.7%	47.5%
Swing	▼4.3pp	▲4.2pp
TPP	51.9%	48.1%
TPP swing	▼2.5pp	▲2.5pp

=== Canning ===
This section is an excerpt from Electoral results for the Division of Canning § 1954

1954 Australian federal election: Canning
Party	Candidate	Votes	%	±%
Country	Len Hamilton	23,196	61.2	−3.4
Labor	Percy Munday	14,714	38.8	+3.4
Total formal votes		37,910	97.8	
Informal votes		856	2.2	
Turnout		38,766	96.5	
Country hold		Swing	−3.4	

=== Curtin ===
This section is an excerpt from Electoral results for the Division of Curtin § 1954

1954 Australian federal election: Curtin
Party	Candidate	Votes	%	±%
Liberal	Paul Hasluck	23,950	61.3	−3.4
Labor	Harry Bishop	15,089	38.7	+3.4
Total formal votes		39,039	98.7	
Informal votes		530	1.3	
Turnout		39,569	96.1	
Liberal hold		Swing	−3.4	

=== Forrest ===
This section is an excerpt from Electoral results for the Division of Forrest § 1954

1954 Australian federal election: Forrest
Party	Candidate	Votes	%	±%
Liberal	Gordon Freeth	23,643	57.7	−1.8
Labor	Frederick O'Connor	17,331	42.3	+1.8
Total formal votes		40,974	98.4	
Informal votes		683	1.6	
Turnout		41,657	97.3	
Liberal hold		Swing	−1.8	

=== Fremantle ===
This section is an excerpt from Electoral results for the Division of Fremantle § 1954

1954 Australian federal election: Fremantle
Party	Candidate	Votes	%	±%
Labor	Kim Beazley Sr.	26,079	54.5	−2.2
Liberal	Douglas McPherson	21,002	43.9	+0.6
Communist	Paddy Troy	765	1.6	+1.6
Total formal votes		47,846	98.5	
Informal votes		722	1.5	
Turnout		48,568	97.2	
Two-party-preferred result
Labor	Kim Beazley Sr.		56.0	−0.7
Liberal	Douglas McPherson		44.0	+0.7
Labor hold		Swing	−0.7	

=== Kalgoorlie ===
This section is an excerpt from Electoral results for the Division of Kalgoorlie § 1954

1954 Australian federal election: Kalgoorlie
Party	Candidate	Votes	%	±%
Labor	Herbert Johnson	17,130	65.6	−34.4
Independent	Harold Illingworth	8,991	34.4	+34.4
Total formal votes		26,121	98.1	
Informal votes		494	1.9	
Turnout		26,615	93.1	
Labor hold		Swing	−34.4	

=== Moore ===
This section is an excerpt from Electoral results for the Division of Moore § 1954

1954 Australian federal election: Moore
Party	Candidate	Votes	%	±%
Country	Hugh Leslie	22,760	57.0	−2.4
Labor	Arthur Dargin	17,143	43.0	+2.4
Total formal votes		39,903	98.2	
Informal votes		741	1.8	
Turnout		40,644	96.1	
Country hold		Swing	−2.4	

=== Perth ===
This section is an excerpt from Electoral results for the Division of Perth § 1954

1954 Australian federal election: Perth
Party	Candidate	Votes	%	±%
Labor	Tom Burke	15,912	51.7	+2.7
Liberal	Robert Phillips	14,087	45.7	−3.8
All Parties	Carlyle Ferguson	530	1.7	+1.7
Communist	John Gandini	275	0.9	−0.6
Total formal votes		30,804	97.8	
Informal votes		679	2.2	
Turnout		31,483	96.6	
Two-party-preferred result
Labor	Tom Burke		52.3	+2.1
Liberal	Robert Phillips		47.7	−2.1
Labor hold		Swing	+2.1	

=== Swan ===
This section is an excerpt from Electoral results for the Division of Swan § 1954

1954 Australian federal election: Swan
Party	Candidate	Votes	%	±%
Labor	Harry Webb	26,799	50.1	+5.9
Liberal	Bill Grayden	25,893	48.4	−4.6
Communist	Jack Marks	838	1.6	−1.2
Total formal votes		53,530	98.4	
Informal votes		856	1.6	
Turnout		53,386	95.8	
Two-party-preferred result
Labor	Harry Webb		51.6	+4.9
Liberal	Bill Grayden		48.4	−4.9
Labor gain from Liberal		Swing	+4.9	

== Tasmania ==
1954 Australian federal election (Tasmania)
- 29 May 1954

All 5 Tasmanian seats in the House of Representatives 3 seats needed for a majority
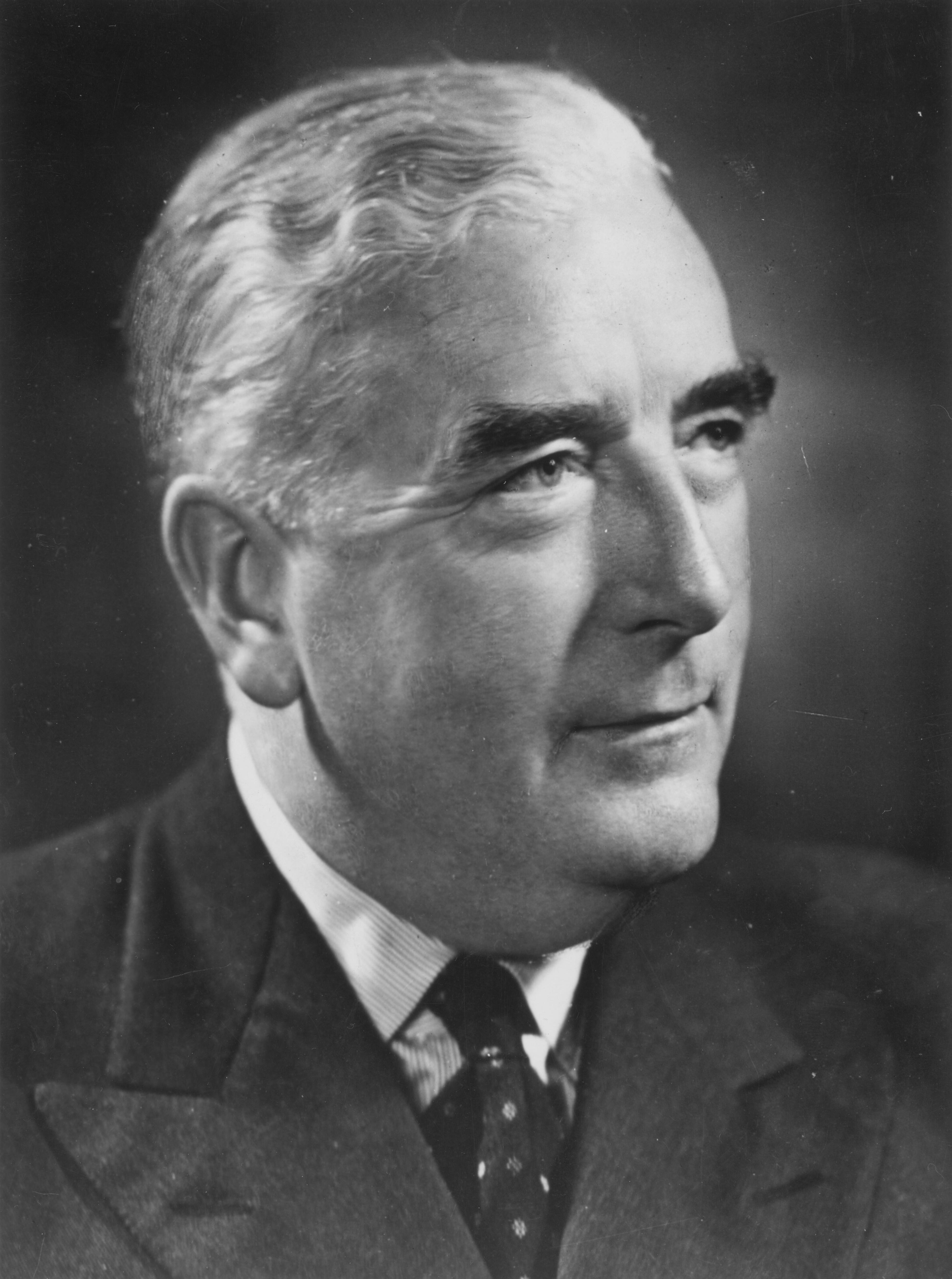

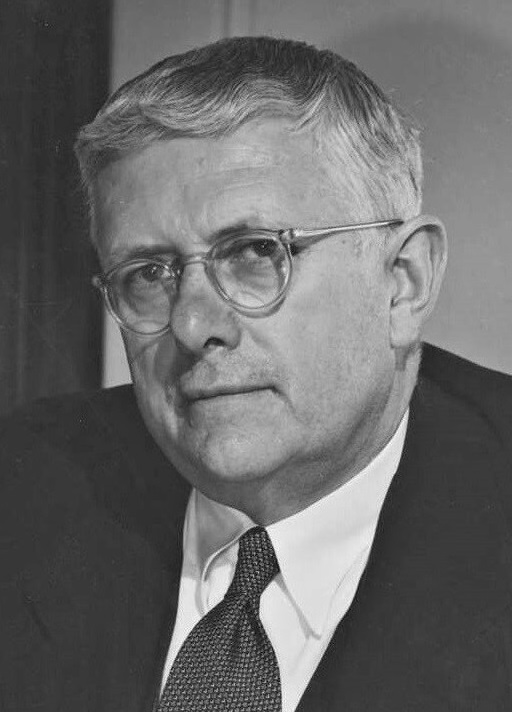
	First party	Second party
Leader	Robert Menzies	H. V. Evatt
Party	Coalition	Labor
Seats before	4	1
Seats won	3	2
Seat change	▼1	▲1
Popular vote	82,243	81,651
Percentage	50.0%	49.6%
Swing	▼1.8pp	▲1.4pp
TPP	50.0%	50.0%
TPP swing	▼2.6pp	▲2.6pp

=== Bass ===
This section is an excerpt from Electoral results for the Division of Bass § 1954

1954 Australian federal election: Bass
Party	Candidate	Votes	%	±%
Labor	Lance Barnard	16,623	51.0	+4.4
Liberal	Bruce Kekwick	15,946	49.0	−4.4
Total formal votes		32,569	99.1	
Informal votes		289	0.9	
Turnout		32,858	96.7	
Labor gain from Liberal		Swing	+4.4	

=== Darwin ===
This section is an excerpt from Electoral results for the Division of Darwin § 1954

1954 Australian federal election: Darwin
Party	Candidate	Votes	%	±%
Liberal	Aubrey Luck	16,447	50.5	+0.8
Labor	Clem Foster	16,117	49.5	−0.8
Total formal votes		32,564	99.1	
Informal votes		283	0.9	
Turnout		32,847	96.5	
Liberal hold		Swing	−3.5	

=== Denison ===
This section is an excerpt from Electoral results for the Division of Denison § 1954

1954 Australian federal election: Denison
Party	Candidate	Votes	%	±%
Liberal	Athol Townley	14,444	52.6	−0.7
Labor	Bert Lacey	12,322	44.9	−1.8
Communist	Max Bound	688	2.5	+2.5
Total formal votes		27,454	98.5	
Informal votes		430	1.5	
Turnout		27,884	95.8	
Two-party-preferred result
Liberal	Athol Townley		52.8	−0.5
Labor	Bert Lacey		47.2	+0.5
Liberal hold		Swing	−0.5	

=== Franklin ===
This section is an excerpt from Electoral results for the Division of Franklin § 1954

1954 Australian federal election: Franklin
Party	Candidate	Votes	%	±%
Liberal	Bill Falkinder	20,447	54.0	−1.4
Labor	Jack Frost	17,396	46.0	+1.4
Total formal votes		37,843	99.2	
Informal votes		306	0.8	
Turnout		38,149	95.7	
Liberal hold		Swing	−1.4	

=== Wilmot ===
This section is an excerpt from Electoral results for the Division of Wilmot § 1954

1954 Australian federal election: Wilmot
Party	Candidate	Votes	%	±%
Labor	Gil Duthie	19,193	56.2	+3.1
Liberal	Lionel Browning	14,959	43.8	−3.1
Total formal votes		34,152	99.2	
Informal votes		289	0.8	
Turnout		34,441	97.0	
Labor hold		Swing	+3.1	

== Territories ==
=== Australian Capital Territory ===
1954 Australian federal election (Australian Capital Territory)
- 29 May 1954

Division of Australian Capital Territory
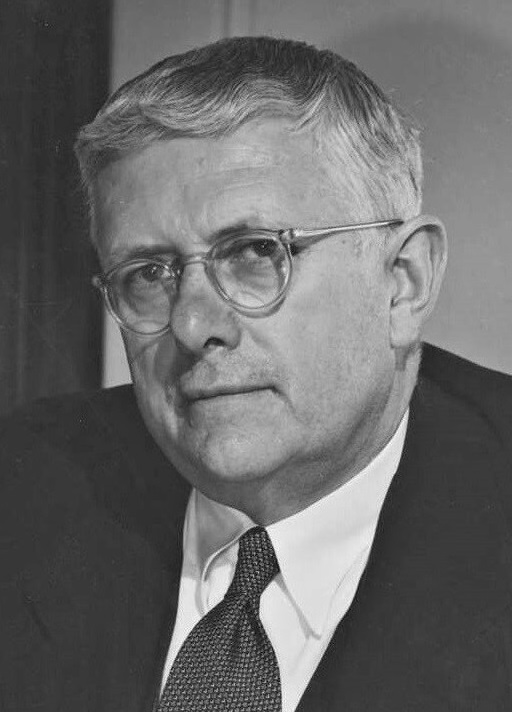

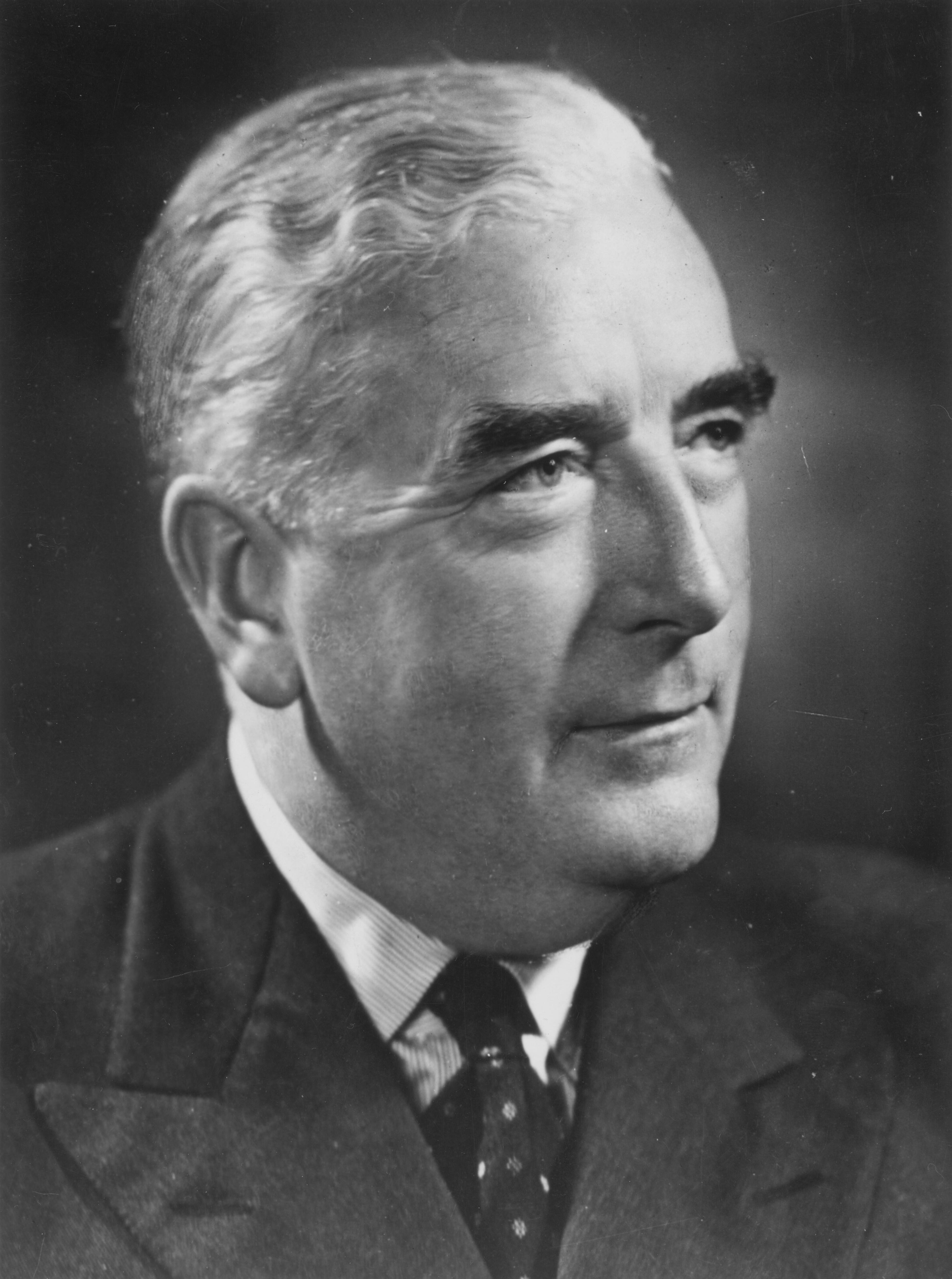
	First party	Second party
Leader	H. V. Evatt	Robert Menzies
Party	Labor	Coalition
Seats before	1	0
Seats won	1	0
Seat change	Steady	Steady
Popular vote	8,762	4,799
Percentage	62.7%	34.4%
Swing	▲12.8pp	▲15.1pp
TPP	64.9%	35.1%
TPP swing	▲14.1pp	▲35.1pp

This section is an excerpt from Electoral results for the Division of Australian Capital Territory § 1954

1954 Australian federal election: Australian Capital Territory
Party	Candidate	Votes	%	±%
Labor	Jim Fraser	8,762	62.7	+12.8
Liberal	Mary Steel Stevenson	4,799	34.4	+15.1
Independent	John Cusack	405	2.9	+2.9
Total formal votes		13,966	99.2	
Informal votes		108	0.8	
Turnout		14,074	94.3	
Two-party-preferred result
Labor	Jim Fraser		64.9	+14.1
Liberal	Mary Steel Stevenson		35.1	+35.1
Labor hold		Swing	+14.1	

=== Northern Territory ===
1954 Australian federal election (Northern Territory)
- 29 May 1954

Division of Northern Territory
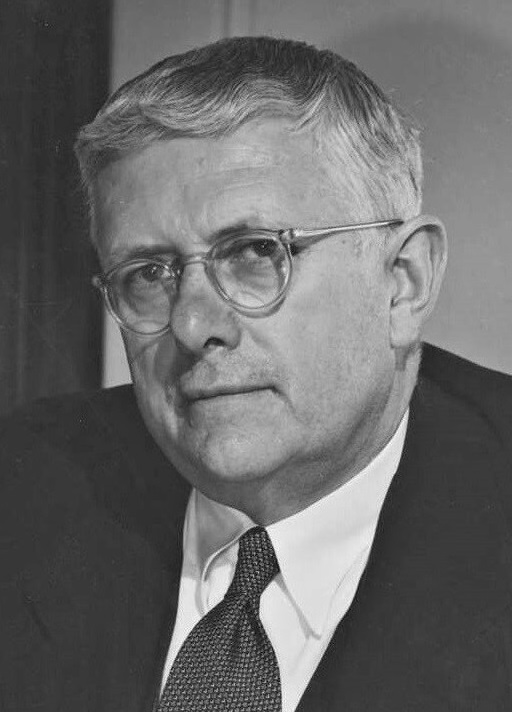

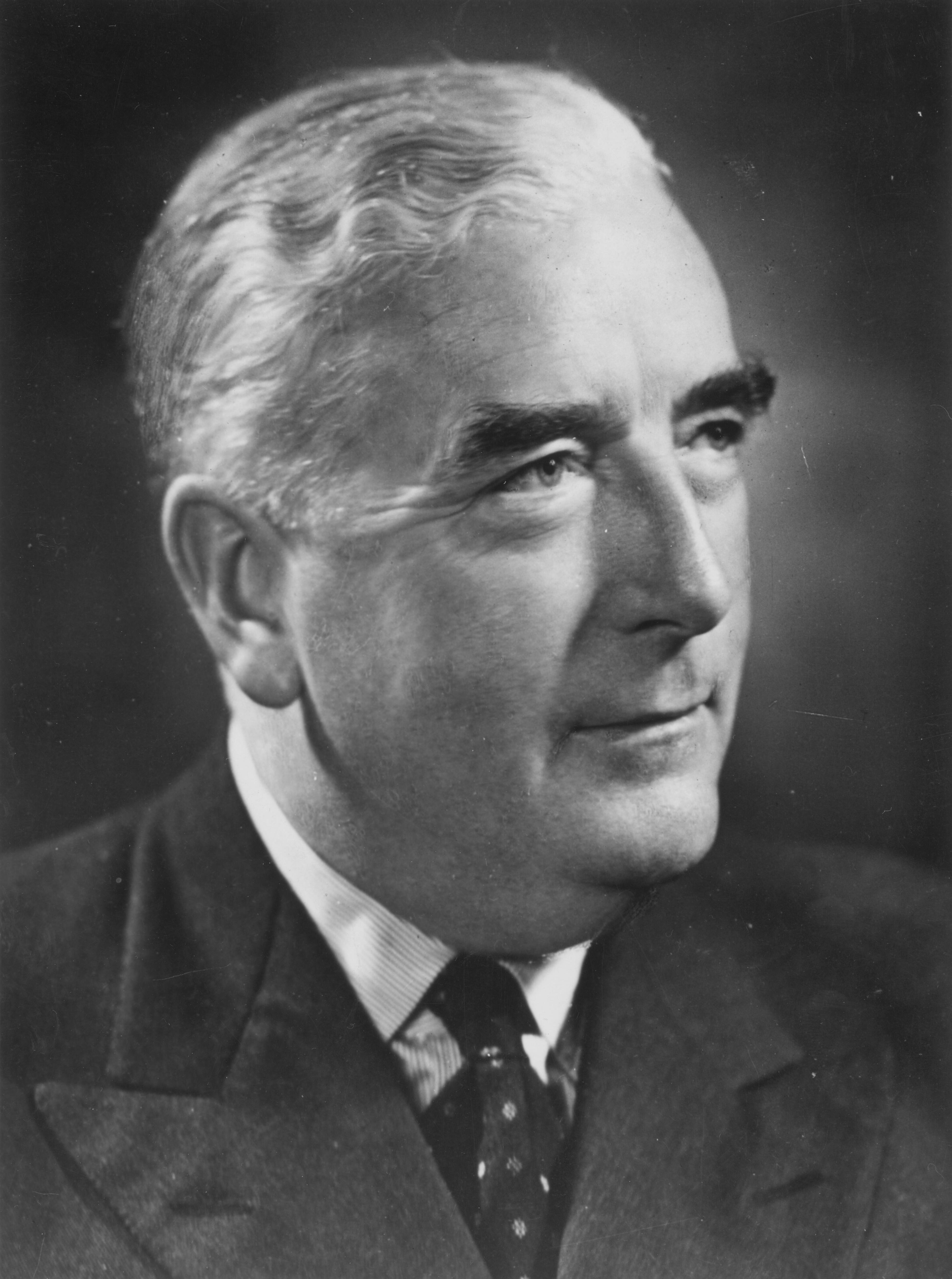
	First party	Second party
Leader	H. V. Evatt	Robert Menzies
Party	Labor	Coalition
Seats before	1	0
Seats won	1	0
Seat change	Steady	Steady
Popular vote	4,021	1,163
Percentage	77.6%	22.4%
Swing	▲13.5pp	▲0.8pp

This section is an excerpt from Electoral results for the Division of Northern Territory § 1954

1954 Australian federal election: Northern Territory
Party	Candidate	Votes	%	±%
Labor	Jock Nelson	4,021	77.6	+13.5
Country	Ralph Edwards	1,163	22.4	+0.8
Total formal votes		5,184	97.8	
Informal votes		115	2.2	
Turnout		5,229	77.1	
Labor hold		Swing	+1.3	

== See also ==
- Candidates of the 1954 Australian federal election
- Members of the Australian House of Representatives, 1954–1955
- Results of the 1953 Australian federal election (Senate)
