= Candidates of the 1954 Australian federal election =

This article provides information on candidates who stood for the 1954 Australian federal election. The election was held on 29 May 1954. There was no election for the Senate.

== By-elections, appointments and defections ==
=== By-elections and appointments ===
- On 28 July 1951, Tony Luchetti (Labor) was elected to replace Ben Chifley (Labor) as the member for Macquarie.
- On 28 July 1951, Percy Joske (Liberal) was elected to replace Thomas White (Liberal) as the member for Balaclava.
- On 22 March 1952, Philip Lucock (Country) was elected to replace Jim Eggins (Country) as the member for Lyne.
- On 18 October 1952, Keith Ewert (Labor) was elected to replace Rupert Ryan (Liberal) as the member for Flinders.
- On 29 November 1952, Gough Whitlam (Labor) was elected to replace Bert Lazzarini (Labor) as the member for Werriwa.
- On 20 December 1952, Harry Turner (Liberal) was elected to replace Billy Hughes (Liberal) as the member for Bradfield.
- On 9 May 1953, Arthur Greenup (Labor) was elected to replace Sol Rosevear (Labor) as the member for Dalley.
- On 29 August 1953, Frank Stewart (Labor) was elected to replace Dan Mulcahy (Labor) as the member for Lang.
- On 29 August 1953, Dan Mackinnon (Liberal) was elected to replace Allan McDonald (Liberal) as the member for Corangamite.
- On 19 December 1953, Ian Allan (Country) was elected to replace Thomas Treloar (Country) as the member for Gwydir.

== Retiring Members ==
=== Country ===
- Bernard Corser MP (Wide Bay, Qld)

== House of Representatives ==
Sitting members at the time of the election are shown in bold text. Successful candidates are highlighted in the relevant colour. Where there is possible confusion, an asterisk (*) is also used.

=== Australian Capital Territory ===
| Electorate | Held by | Labor candidate | Liberal candidate | Independent candidates |
|---|---|---|---|---|
| Australian Capital Territory | Labor | **Jim Fraser** | Mary Steel Stevenson | John Cusack |

=== New South Wales ===
| Electorate | Held by | Labor candidate | Coalition candidate | Communist candidate | Other candidates |
|---|---|---|---|---|---|
| Banks | Labor | **Eric Costa** | Harold Stalker (Lib) | Pat Clancy | |
| Barton | Labor | **H. V. Evatt** | Bill Arthur (Lib) | | |
| Bennelong | Liberal | Thomas Campbell | **John Cramer** (Lib) | | |
| Blaxland | Labor | **Eli Harrison** | Reginald Allsop (Lib) | Jack Hughes | |
| Bradfield | Liberal | | **Harry Turner** (Lib) | | |
| Calare | Liberal | John Breen | **John Howse** (Lib) | | Madge Roberts (Ind) |
| Cook | Labor | **Tom Sheehan** | | Harry Hatfield | Percy Staines (Ind) |
| Cowper | Country | William Bailey | **Sir Earle Page** (CP) | Kenneth Harding | |
| Cunningham | Labor | **Billy Davies** | John Parkinson (Lib) | Bill Parkinson | |
| Dalley | Labor | **Arthur Greenup** | Robert Stafford (Lib) | Flo Davis | |
| Darling | Labor | **Joe Clark** | Rodan Dawson (CP) | | |
| East Sydney | Labor | **Eddie Ward** | George Chambers (Lib) | Bill Brown | |
| Eden-Monaro | Labor | **Allan Fraser** | Royce Beavis (Lib) | | |
| Evans | Liberal | Robert Bailey | **Frederick Osborne** (Lib) | | |
| Farrer | Liberal | Daniel Byrnes | **David Fairbairn** (Lib) | | |
| Grayndler | Labor | **Fred Daly** | Kenneth Innes (Lib) | | William McCristal (Ind) |
| Gwydir | Country | Michael Quinn | **Ian Allan** (CP) | | |
| Hume | Labor | **Arthur Fuller** | Charles Anderson (CP); Linden Roth (Lib) | | |
| Hunter | Labor | **Rowley James** | Edward Farrell (Lib) | Evan Phillips | John McCroarey (Ind); John White (Ind) |
| Kingsford-Smith | Labor | **Gordon Anderson** | George Dan (Lib) | | |
| Lang | Labor | **Frank Stewart** | John Spicer (Lib) | | |
| Lawson | Country | Alan Manning | **Laurie Failes** (CP) | | Dick Bourke (Ind) |
| Lowe | Liberal | William Webster | **William McMahon** (Lib) | | |
| Lyne | Country | | **Philip Lucock** (CP) | | Joe Cordner (Ind); Donald Lancaster (Ind) |
| Macarthur | Liberal | Claude Allen | **Jeff Bate** (Lib) | | |
| Mackellar | Liberal | Francis Neate | **Bill Wentworth** (Lib) | Ray Clarke | |
| Macquarie | Labor | **Tony Luchetti** | Horace Brownlow (Lib) | John King | |
| Martin | Labor | **William O'Connor** | Elton Lewis (Lib) | Ernie Thornton | |
| Mitchell | Liberal | Doug Bowd | **Roy Wheeler** (Lib) | Mel McCalman | |
| New England | Country | Frederick Cowley | **David Drummond** (CP) | | |
| Newcastle | Labor | **David Watkins** | Matthew Tapp (Lib) | Doug Olive | Sidney Monroe (Ind) |
| North Sydney | Liberal | Leo Haylen | **William Jack** (Lib) | | |
| Parkes | Labor | **Les Haylen** | William Ness (Lib) | | |
| Parramatta | Liberal | John Holmes | **Howard Beale** (Lib) | | |
| Paterson | Liberal | Kevin Barlow | **Allen Fairhall** (Lib) | | |
| Phillip | Labor | **Joe Fitzgerald** | Henry Clarke (Lib) | | |
| Reid | Labor | **Charles Morgan** | Bob Mutton (Lib) | Laurie Aarons | Horace Hancock (OLM) |
| Richmond | Country | | **Larry Anthony** (CP) | | |
| Riverina | Country | Michael Sheehan | **Hugh Roberton** (CP) | Les Kelton | |
| Robertson | Liberal | Walter Geraghty | **Roger Dean** (Lib) | John Tapp | |
| Shortland | Labor | **Charles Griffiths** | Arthur Downey (Lib) | | |
| St George | Liberal | Nelson Lemmon | **Bill Graham** (Lib) | | |
| Warringah | Liberal | Ronald Nibbs | **Francis Bland** (Lib) | | Ernest White (Ind) |
| Watson | Labor | **Dan Curtin** | Hubert O'Connell (Lib) | | |
| Wentworth | Liberal | | **Sir Eric Harrison** (Lib) | | |
| Werriwa | Labor | **Gough Whitlam** | Jack Lee (Lib) | Edwin Lipscombe | |
| West Sydney | Labor | **Dan Minogue** | | Lance Sharkey | Anthony Micallef (Ind) |

=== Northern Territory ===
| Electorate | Held by | Labor candidate | Country candidate |
|---|---|---|---|
| Northern Territory | Labor | **Jock Nelson** | Ralph Edwards |

=== Queensland ===
| Electorate | Held by | Labor candidate | Coalition candidate | Other candidates |
|---|---|---|---|---|
| Bowman | Liberal | Jack Houston | **Malcolm McColm** (Lib) | Mabel Hanson (CPA) |
| Brisbane | Labor | **George Lawson** | Vic Mead (Lib) | Max Julius (CPA) |
| Capricornia | Liberal | Mick Gardner | **George Pearce** (Lib) | Eric Browne (CPA) |
| Darling Downs | Liberal | William Watson | **Reginald Swartz** (Lib) | |
| Dawson | Country | George Hyde | **Charles Davidson** (CP) | |
| Fisher | Country | Sydney Campbell | **Charles Adermann** (CP) | |
| Griffith | Liberal | Wilfred Coutts | **Doug Berry** (Lib) | |
| Herbert | Labor | **Bill Edmonds** | Fred Purdie (CP) | Claude Jones (CPA) |
| Kennedy | Labor | **Bill Riordan** | Cliff Lanham (CP) | |
| Leichhardt | Labor | **Harry Bruce** | Tom Gilmore (CP) | Joe Howe (CPA) |
| Lilley | Liberal | Bernard Williams | **Bruce Wight** (Lib) | |
| McPherson | Country | | **Sir Arthur Fadden** (CP) | Sir Raphael Cilento (Ind Dem) |
| Maranoa | Country | Eric Taylor | **Wilfred Brimblecombe** (CP) | Charles Russell (Ind Dem) |
| Moreton | Liberal | Ted Mansfield | **Josiah Francis** (Lib) | Bill Yarrow (CPA) |
| Oxley | Liberal | Norman Thomas | **Donald Cameron** (Lib) | Tom Millar (CPA) |
| Petrie | Liberal | Alexander Barry | **Alan Hulme** (Lib) | |
| Ryan | Liberal | Frank Luton | **Nigel Drury** (Lib) | |
| Wide Bay | Country | Frank Forde | William Brand (CP) | Frank Falls (CPA) |

=== South Australia ===
| Electorate | Held by | Labor candidate | Liberal candidate | Other candidates |
|---|---|---|---|---|
| Adelaide | Labor | **Cyril Chambers** | Nancy Buttfield | Charles McCaffrey (CPA) |
| Angas | Liberal | | **Alick Downer** | |
| Barker | Liberal | Ralph Dettman | **Archie Cameron** | |
| Boothby | Liberal | Rex Mathews | **John McLeay** | |
| Grey | Labor | **Edgar Russell** | Thomas Cheesman | |
| Hindmarsh | Labor | **Clyde Cameron** | | |
| Kingston | Labor | **Pat Galvin** | Howard Zelling | |
| Port Adelaide | Labor | **Albert Thompson** | | Alan Finger (CPA) |
| Sturt | Liberal | Norman Makin | **Keith Wilson** | |
| Wakefield | Liberal | Edward Harradine | **Sir Philip McBride** | Hector Henstridge (Ind) |

=== Tasmania ===
| Electorate | Held by | Labor candidate | Liberal candidate | Communist candidate |
|---|---|---|---|---|
| Bass | Liberal | Lance Barnard | **Bruce Kekwick** | |
| Darwin | Liberal | Clem Foster | **Aubrey Luck** | |
| Denison | Liberal | Bert Lacey | **Athol Townley** | Max Bound |
| Franklin | Liberal | Jack Frost | **Bill Falkinder** | |
| Wilmot | Labor | **Gil Duthie** | Lionel Browning | |

=== Victoria ===
| Electorate | Held by | Labor candidate | Coalition candidate | Other candidates |
|---|---|---|---|---|
| Balaclava | Liberal | Leonard Prior | **Percy Joske** (Lib) | |
| Ballaarat | Labor | **Bob Joshua** | Allen Driscoll (Lib) | |
| Batman | Labor | **Alan Bird** | Neil McKay (Lib) | Andy Wallace (CPA) |
| Bendigo | Labor | **Percy Clarey** | John Barton (Lib) | |
| Burke | Labor | **Ted Peters** | Alfred Wall (Lib) | Vida Little (CPA) |
| Chisholm | Liberal | Les Cahill | **Wilfrid Kent Hughes** (Lib) | |
| Corangamite | Liberal | Angus McLean | **Dan Mackinnon** (Lib) | |
| Corio | Liberal | John Dedman | **Hubert Opperman** (Lib) | |
| Darebin | Labor | **Tom Andrews** | Charles White (Lib) | |
| Deakin | Liberal | Gordon Bryant | **Frank Davis** (Lib) | |
| Fawkner | Labor | **Bill Bourke** | Peter Howson (Lib) | |
| Flinders | Labor | **Keith Ewert** | Robert Lindsay (Lib) | |
| Gellibrand | Labor | **Jack Mullens** | George Carrington (Lib) | Alex Dobbin (CPA) |
| Gippsland | Country | Syd Crofts | **George Bowden** (CP) | |
| Henty | Liberal | Alexander Miller | **Jo Gullett** (Lib) | Noel Schafer (Ind Lib) |
| Higgins | Liberal | Benjamin Nicholas | **Harold Holt** (Lib) | |
| Higinbotham | Liberal | Geoffrey Sowerbutts | **Frank Timson** (Lib) | |
| Hoddle | Labor | **Jack Cremean** | Desmond Byrne (Lib) | John Prescott (CPA) |
| Indi | Liberal | Carl Reeves | **William Bostock*** (Lib); Cyril Davy (CP) | |
| Isaacs | Liberal | Don MacSween | **William Haworth** (Lib) | |
| Kooyong | Liberal | George Miller | **Robert Menzies** (Lib) | Rex Mortimer (CPA) |
| La Trobe | Liberal | Edward Smith | **Richard Casey** (Lib) | Gerry O'Day (CPA) |
| Lalor | Labor | **Reg Pollard** | George Morison (Lib) | |
| Mallee | Country | | **Winton Turnbull** (CP) | |
| Maribyrnong | Labor | **Arthur Drakeford** | Stuart Collie (Lib) | Frank Johnson (CPA) |
| McMillan | Liberal | Desmond Devlin | **Geoffrey Brown*** (Lib); John McDonald (CP) | Bob Hamilton (CPA) |
| Melbourne | Labor | **Arthur Calwell** | Alfred Carter (Lib) | |
| Melbourne Ports | Labor | **Frank Crean** | Norman Fittock (Lib) | Ted Bull (CPA) |
| Murray | Country | | **John McEwen** (CP) | |
| Wannon | Labor | **Don McLeod** | Malcolm Fraser (Lib) | |
| Wills | Labor | **Bill Bryson** | Ian Ingram (Lib) | |
| Wimmera | Liberal | Cyril Sudholz | Herbert Hilton (CP); **William Lawrence*** (Lib) | |
| Yarra | Labor | **Stan Keon** | Jim MacDonald (Lib) | Ken Miller (CPA) |

=== Western Australia ===
| Electorate | Held by | Labor candidate | Coalition candidate | Other candidates |
|---|---|---|---|---|
| Canning | Country | Percy Munday | **Len Hamilton** (CP) | |
| Curtin | Liberal | Harry Bishop | **Paul Hasluck** (Lib) | |
| Forrest | Liberal | Frederick O'Connor | **Gordon Freeth** (Lib) | |
| Fremantle | Labor | **Kim Beazley** | Douglas McPherson (Lib) | Paddy Troy (CPA) |
| Kalgoorlie | Labor | **Herbert Johnson** | | Harold Illingworth (Ind) |
| Moore | Country | Arthur Dargin | **Hugh Leslie** (CP) | |
| Perth | Labor | **Tom Burke** | Robert Phillips (Lib) | Carlyle Ferguson (APA); John Gandini (CPA) |
| Swan | Liberal | Harry Webb | **Bill Grayden** (Lib) | Jack Marks (CPA) |

== Summary by party ==
Beside each party is the number of seats contested by that party in the House of Representatives for each state.

| Party | NSW | Vic | Qld | WA | SA | Tas | ACT | NT | Total |
|---|---|---|---|---|---|---|---|---|---|
| Australian Labor Party | 44 | 31 | 17 | 8 | 9 | 5 | 1 | 1 | 116 |
| Liberal Party of Australia | 37 | 30 | 10 | 5 | 8 | 5 | 1 | | 96 |
| Australian Country Party | 9 | 6 | 8 | 2 | | | | 1 | 26 |
| Communist Party of Australia | 18 | 10 | 8 | 3 | 2 | 1 | | | 42 |
| All Parties Administration | | | | 1 | | | | | 1 |
| Independent and other | 11 | 1 | 2 | 1 | 1 | | 1 | | 17 |

== See also ==
- 1954 Australian federal election
- Members of the Australian House of Representatives, 1951–1954
- Members of the Australian House of Representatives, 1954–1955
- List of political parties in Australia
