= Democratic Party of Australia =

- President: Henry Woodward (1953; 1953–1954)
- Founded: 17 February 1953
- Dissolved: 6 June 1954
- Willoughby Municipal Council: 1 / 12 (1953−1954)

The Democratic Party of Australia (DPA), sometimes referred to as the Australian Democratic Party, was an Australian political party that was active in the mid-1950s.

Ahead of the 1953 Senate election, the party merged with the Queensland-based Independent Democratic Party (IDP). However, they split following the election. The party was also separate from the North Queensland Democratic Party, which had itself been formed just weeks after the DPA.

== History ==
The party was formed in Sydney on 17 February 1953 by a group who had organised the campaign of independent candidate Martin Hardie at the 1952 Bradfield by-election. It was chaired by former Willoughby mayor A. R. Baldwin. According to its secretary, Major S. K. Hatfleld, the party opposed the Liberal Party's policy on taxation and the Labor Party's policy on socialisation.

The party merged with the Independent Democrats several months before the 1953 Senate election, with the DPA's Charles Russell (a former Country Party MP) saying the decision was made because both parties had similar aims and ideologies. The party endorsed public health administrator Raphael Cilento (of the IDP) as its lead candidate in Queensland.

At the Senate election, the party's ticket was unsuccessful, winning 6% of the vote. Shortly after, the party opened nominations for candidates for the next federal election.

The party endorsed Thomas Brosnan as its candidate for the 1953 Lang by-election. However, Brosnan was disendorsed after the close of nominations as he had not been a resident of Australia for three years.

Following the by-election, several members of the party's New South Wales executive resigned, including organising secretary Douglas Maxwell in October 1953. Around this time, the DPA split from the IDP.

On 6 June 1954, the party's New South Wales branch disbanded, thus dissolving the party entirely.

== Leaders ==
=== President ===
No.	Image	Name	Term start	Term end	Office	Ref.
1		Henry Woodward (1898–1966)	22 March 1953	8 August 1953	MP for Lane Cove (1944−1947)	
2		J. A. Garnsey	8 August 1953	September−November 1953		
(1)		Henry Woodward (1898–1966)	September−November 1953	6 June 1954	MP for Lane Cove (1944−1947)	
