= Members of the Australian House of Representatives, 1954–1955 =

This is a list of the members of the Australian House of Representatives in the 21st Australian Parliament, which was elected at the 1954 election on 29 May 1954. The incumbent Liberal Party of Australia led by Prime Minister of Australia Robert Menzies with coalition partner the Country Party led by Arthur Fadden lost a net of five seats, but defeated the Australian Labor Party led by Herbert Evatt.

Member	Party	Electorate	State	In office
Charles Adermann	Country	Fisher	Qld	1943–1972
Ian Allan	Country	Gwydir	NSW	1953–1969
Gordon Anderson	Labor	Kingsford Smith	NSW	1949–1955
Tom Andrews	Labor/Labor (A-C)	Darebin	Vic	1949–1955
Larry Anthony	Country	Richmond	NSW	1937–1957
Lance Barnard	Labor	Bass	Tas	1954–1975
Jeff Bate	Liberal	Macarthur	NSW	1949–1972
Howard Beale	Liberal	Parramatta	NSW	1946–1958
Kim Beazley	Labor	Fremantle	WA	1945–1977
Alan Bird	Labor	Batman	Vic	1949–1962
Francis Bland	Liberal	Warringah	NSW	1951–1961
William Bostock	Liberal	Indi	Vic	1949–1958
Bill Bourke	Labor/Labor (A-C)	Fawkner	Vic	1949–1955
George Bowden	Country	Gippsland	Vic	1943–1961
William Brand	Country	Wide Bay	Qld	1954–1958
Wilfred Brimblecombe	Country	Maranoa	Qld	1951–1966
Geoffrey Brown	Liberal	McMillan	Vic	1949–1955
Harry Bruce	Labor	Leichhardt	Qld	1951–1958
Tom Burke	Labor	Perth	WA	1943–1955
Bill Bryson	Labor/Labor (A-C)	Wills	Vic	1943–1946, 1949–1955
Arthur Calwell	Labor	Melbourne	Vic	1940–1972
Archie Cameron	Liberal	Barker	SA	1934–1956
Clyde Cameron	Labor	Hindmarsh	SA	1949–1980
Donald Cameron	Liberal	Oxley	Qld	1949–1961
Richard Casey	Liberal	La Trobe	Vic	1931–1940, 1949–1960
Cyril Chambers	Labor	Adelaide	SA	1943–1958
Percy Clarey	Labor	Bendigo	Vic	1949–1960
Joe Clark	Labor	Darling	NSW	1934–1969
Jim Cope	Labor	Cook	NSW	1955–1975
Eric Costa	Labor	Banks	NSW	1949–1969
Wilfred Coutts	Labor	Griffith	Qld	1954–1958, 1961–1966
John Cramer	Liberal	Bennelong	NSW	1949–1974
Frank Crean	Labor	Melbourne Ports	Vic	1951–1977
Jack Cremean	Labor/Labor (A-C)	Hoddle	Vic	1949–1955
Dan Curtin	Labor	Watson	NSW	1949–1969
Fred Daly	Labor	Grayndler	NSW	1943–1975
Charles Davidson	Country	Dawson	Qld	1946–1963
Billy Davies	Labor	Cunningham	NSW	1949–1956
Frank Davis	Liberal	Deakin	Vic	1949–1966
Roger Dean	Liberal	Robertson	NSW	1949–1964
Alick Downer	Liberal	Angas	SA	1949–1964
Arthur Drakeford	Labor	Maribyrnong	Vic	1934–1955
David Drummond	Country	New England	NSW	1949–1963
Nigel Drury	Liberal	Ryan	Qld	1949–1975
Gil Duthie	Labor	Wilmot	Tas	1946–1975
Bill Edmonds	Labor	Herbert	Qld	1946–1958
H.V. Evatt	Labor	Barton	NSW	1940–1960
Arthur Fadden	Country	McPherson	Qld	1936–1958
Laurie Failes	Country	Lawson	NSW	1949–1969
David Fairbairn	Liberal	Farrer	NSW	1949–1975
Allen Fairhall	Liberal	Paterson	NSW	1949–1969
Bill Falkinder	Liberal	Franklin	Tas	1946–1966
Joe Fitzgerald	Labor	Phillip	NSW	1949–1955
Josiah Francis	Liberal	Moreton	Qld	1922–1955
Allan Fraser	Labor	Eden-Monaro	NSW	1943–1966, 1969–1972
Jim Fraser	Labor	Australian Capital Territory	ACT	1951–1970
Gordon Freeth	Liberal	Forrest	WA	1949–1969
Arthur Fuller	Labor	Hume	NSW	1943–1949, 1951–1955, 1961–1963
Pat Galvin	Labor	Kingston	SA	1951–1966
Arthur Greenup	Labor	Dalley	NSW	1953–1955
Charles Griffiths	Labor	Shortland	NSW	1949–1972
Jo Gullett	Liberal	Henty	Vic	1946–1955
Len Hamilton	Country	Canning	WA	1946–1961
Eric Harrison	Liberal	Wentworth	NSW	1931–1956
Eli Harrison	Labor	Blaxland	NSW	1949–1969
Paul Hasluck	Liberal	Curtin	WA	1949–1969
William Haworth	Liberal	Isaacs	Vic	1949–1969
Les Haylen	Labor	Parkes	NSW	1943–1963
Harold Holt	Liberal	Higgins	Vic	1935–1967
John Howse	Liberal	Calare	NSW	1946–1960
Alan Hulme	Liberal	Petrie	Qld	1949–1961, 1963–1972
William Jack	Liberal	North Sydney	NSW	1949–1966
Rowley James	Labor	Hunter	NSW	1928–1958
Herbert Johnson	Labor	Kalgoorlie	WA	1940–1958
Bob Joshua	Labor/Labor (A-C)	Ballaarat	Vic	1951–1955
Percy Joske	Liberal	Balaclava	Vic	1951–1960
Wilfrid Kent Hughes	Liberal	Chisholm	Vic	1949–1970
Stan Keon	Labor/Labor (A-C)	Yarra	Vic	1949–1955
William Lawrence	Liberal	Wimmera	Vic	1949–1958
George Lawson	Labor	Brisbane	Qld	1931–1961
Nelson Lemmon	Labor	St George	NSW	1943–1949, 1954–1955
Hugh Leslie	Country	Moore	WA	1949–1958, 1961–1963
Robert Lindsay	Liberal	Flinders	Vic	1954–1966
Tony Luchetti	Labor	Macquarie	NSW	1951–1975
Aubrey Luck	Liberal	Darwin	Tas	1951–1958
Philip Lucock	Country	Lyne	NSW	1952–1980
Dan Mackinnon	Liberal	Corangamite	Vic	1949–1951, 1953–1966
Norman Makin	Labor	Sturt	SA	1919–1946, 1954–1963
Philip McBride	Liberal	Wakefield	SA	1931–1937, 1937–1943 (S), 1946–1958
Malcolm McColm	Liberal	Bowman	Qld	1949–1961
John McEwen	Country	Murray	Vic	1934–1971
John McLeay Sr.	Liberal	Boothby	SA	1949–1966
Don McLeod	Labor	Wannon	Vic	1940–1949, 1951–1955
William McMahon	Liberal	Lowe	NSW	1949–1982
Robert Menzies	Liberal	Kooyong	Vic	1934–1966
Dan Minogue	Labor	West Sydney	NSW	1949–1969
Charles Morgan	Labor	Reid	NSW	1940–1946, 1949–1958
Jack Mullens	Labor/Labor (A-C)	Gellibrand	Vic	1949–1955
Jock Nelson	Labor	Northern Territory	NT	1949–1966
William O'Connor	Labor	Martin	NSW	1946–1969
Hubert Opperman	Liberal	Corio	Vic	1949–1967
Frederick Osborne	Liberal	Evans	NSW	1949–1961
Sir Earle Page	Country	Cowper	NSW	1919–1961
Henry Pearce	Liberal	Capricornia	Qld	1949–1961
Ted Peters	Labor	Burke	Vic	1949–1969
Reg Pollard	Labor	Lalor	Vic	1937–1966
Bill Riordan	Labor	Kennedy	Qld	1936–1966
Hugh Roberton	Country	Riverina	NSW	1949–1965
Edgar Russell	Labor	Grey	SA	1943–1963
Tom Sheehan	Labor	Cook	NSW	1937–1955
Frank Stewart	Labor	Lang	NSW	1953–1979
Reginald Swartz	Liberal	Darling Downs	Qld	1949–1972
Albert Thompson	Labor	Port Adelaide	SA	1946–1963
Frank Timson	Liberal	Higinbotham	Vic	1949–1960
Athol Townley	Liberal	Denison	Tas	1949–1964
Winton Turnbull	Country	Mallee	Vic	1946–1972
Harry Turner	Liberal	Bradfield	NSW	1952–1974
Eddie Ward	Labor	East Sydney	NSW	1931, 1932–1963
David Oliver Watkins	Labor	Newcastle	NSW	1935–1958
Harry Webb	Labor	Swan	WA	1954–1958, 1961–1972
Bill Wentworth	Liberal	Mackellar	NSW	1949–1977
Roy Wheeler	Liberal	Mitchell	NSW	1949–1961
Gough Whitlam	Labor	Werriwa	NSW	1952–1978
Bruce Wight	Liberal	Lilley	Qld	1949–1961
