= 1953 Lang by-election =

A by-election was held for the Australian House of Representatives seat of Lang on 29 August 1953, following the death of Labor MP Dan Mulcahy. It was held on the same day as a by-election for the seat of Corangamite

The Democratic Party of Australia endorsed Thomas Brosnan as its candidate, however he was disendorsed after the close of nominations as he had not been a resident of Australia for three years.

The by-election was won by Labor candidate Frank Stewart.

== Results ==
1953 Lang by-election
Party	Candidate	Votes	%	±%
Labor	Frank Stewart	21,699	53.9	+3.9
Liberal	Herbert Thorncraft	17,218	42.8	−2.5
Communist	Roy Boyd	1,082	2.7	−2.0
Democratic	Thomas Brosnan (disendorsed)	275	0.7	+0.7
Total formal votes		40,274	98.6	
Informal votes		584	1.4	
Turnout		40,858	91.0	
Two-party-preferred result
Labor	Frank Stewart		56.7	+3.5
Liberal	Herbert Thorncraft		43.3	−3.5
Labor hold		Swing	+3.5	
