= Independent Democratic Party (Australia) =

- Leader: Raphael Cilento
- Founded: 1953
- Dissolved: 1954

The Independent Democratic Party (IDP), sometimes referred to as the Independent Democratic Group, the Queensland Democratic Party or simply the Democratic Party, was an Australian political party that was active in the mid-1950s. It was led by public health administrator Raphael Cilento.

Ahead of the 1953 Senate election, the party merged with the New South Wales-based Democratic Party of Australia (DPA). However, they split following the election. The party was also separate from the North Queensland Democratic Party.

== History ==
The party merged with the Democratic Party several months before the 1953 Senate election, with the DPA's Charles Russell (a former Country Party MP) saying the decision was made because both parties had similar aims and ideologies. The party endorsed Cilento as its lead candidate in Queensland. Not long after the Senate election, which saw the Democratic ticket fail to win a seat, the parties split.

At the 1954 federal election, Cilento ran as the IDP's candidate in the division of McPherson, held by Country Party leader Arthur Fadden. He was unsuccessful, receiving 34% of the vote.

== Policies ==
The party pledged to "restore representative government" in Australia, with Cilento criticising the two-party-system and stating that "uncontrolled competition between parties, and machine politics generally, can only lead to totalitarianism".
