= Official Labour Movement =

- Leader: Horace Hancock
- Founder: Horace Hancock
- Founded: 23 August 1953
- Dissolved: 1955
- Split from: Australian Labor Party
- Fairfield City Council: 2 / 15 (1953−1955)

The Official Labour Movement (OLM) was an Australian political party that was active in the 1950s. It was formed as a result of a split from the New South Wales branch of the Australian Labor Party (ALP).

== History ==
The party was formed in Sydney on 23 August 1953 by Fairfield alderman Horace Hancock, with 70 people − including alderman William Leonard Wolfenden, a former mayor of Fairfield − joining the party at its first meeting. Its provisional name was the Progressive Labor Party, which was the same name as a Victorian party that had also split from the ALP. The meeting was attended by Hartley MP Jim Chalmers, who had resigned from Labor prior to the state election in February 1953.

Hancock, along with six other people, resigned from the ALP after forming the new party, but the ALP Central Executive refused to accept their resignations. They were eventually expelled on 4 September 1953.

The party officially changed its name to the Official Labour Movement on 13 September 1953.

At the local government elections in December 1953, the OLM contested the three-member Yennora Ward and won two seats, with Hancock and Wolfenden both re-elected.

Hancock contested the 1954 federal election in the division of Reid, going up against ALP MP Charles Morgan. He was unsuccessful, winning 6.4% of the primary vote while Morgan was re-elected.

The OLM remained active for several months after the election, but faded away in 1955.
