= Flo Cluff =

Australian trade unionist

Flo Cluff OAM
- Born: Florence Amy Davis; 4 November 1902; Chillagoe, Queensland, Australia
- Died: 20 September 1990 (aged 87); Kogarah, New South Wales, Australia
- Resting place: Rookwood Cemetery, Sydney, Australia
- Occupations: Trade unionist, pensioner activist
- Awards: Medal of the Order of Australia

Florence Amy "Flo" Cluff OAM, formerly Kershaw and Davis (4 November 1902 – 20 September 1990) was an Australian trade unionist, communist and pensioner activist.

Born at Chillagoe in Queensland to English-born railway carpenter Frederick William Davis and Florence Emma, née Nightingale, Flo attended school at Chillagoe, Einasleigh and Cairns. Her father died in a railway bridge accident in 1921 and she left her teaching position to care for her mother, who died within months. She married labourer Robert Dawson Kershaw at Einasleigh on 29 November 1921; she moved to Brisbane in 1931 and was divorced in 1932.

In 1935, Davis moved to Sydney and worked at a cafe in Pitt Street. During this time she became involved with trade unions and flirted with communism. After the birth of her illegitimate daughter, she joined the Communist Party of Australia in 1937. She married her child's father, soldier Geoffrey Brown, on 29 November 1940 (they would later divorce). Also in 1940 she was elected to the executive of the hotel, Club, Restaurant, Caterers, Tea Rooms and Boarding House Employees' Union of New South Wales (HCRU), becoming assistant secretary in 1941 and secretary in 1945. She was one of the first women elected to the secretaryship of a union and radicalised the HCRU during her tenure, requiring larger hotels to provide female cooks with equal pay and instituting the five-day working week, sick leave and weekend penalty rates.

Under her leadership, the HCRU supported the 1946 boycott of Dutch ships in support of Indonesian independence and the 1949 miners' strike, and opposed nuclear testing on Aboriginal land at Maralinga, the 1950 Communist Party dissolution bill and the Korean War. Davis stood for the seat of Dalley for the Communists at the 1954 federal election and for the Senate in 1955 and 1958. The HCRU was absorbed into the Federated Liquor & Allied Industries Employees' Union of Australia in 1961 and Davis became independent secretary. She retired in 1968 and was named Woman of the Year by the Australian International Women's Day Committee.

On 9 October 1975 Flo Davis married retired cleaner Eric James Richard Cluff; the newlyweds travelled around Australia before joining the Petersham branch of the Combined Pensioners' Association. She became assistant secretary in 1979 and secretary in 1980, campaigning for better pensions, health and welfare services, utility rebates and transport concessions. Awarded the Medal of the Order of Australia in 1984, she resigned as secretary in 1988. Cluff died at Kogarah in 1990 and was buried in Rookwood Cemetery.
