= John Gandini =

Australian trade unionist

John Rivo Gandini (28 March 1929 - 27 July 2016) was an Australian trade unionist.

Gandini was a member of the Electrical Trades Union and was elected president and served from 1983 to 1993. He was president of the Trades and Labor Council of Western Australia from 1988 to 1994. In the 1950s and 1960s he was a prominent communist and ran several times for parliament both state and federal unsuccessfully.
