= Rex Mortimer =

Australian academic and expert on communism

Rex Alfred Mortimer
- Born: 11 February 1926; Mordialloc, Melbourne
- Died: New Year's Eve, 1979; Royal North Shore Hospital
- Known for: Solicitor, communist and academic

Rex Alfred Mortimer (11 February 1926 – 31 December 1979) was an Australian academic and expert on communism.

Mortimer attended Melbourne High School and received a Bachelor of Laws degree from the University of Melbourne in 1947. He became a member of the Communist Party of Australia at the university and remained active until 1969. He completed a doctorate dissertation on the Communist Party of Indonesia at Monash University in 1971 under the guidance of Herbert Feith. Mortimer went on to become a faculty member of the University of Sydney before dying of cancer at Royal North Shore Hospital on New Year's Eve 1979. Peter Singer cites his death as an assisted suicide case in Rethinking Life & Death, reporting that Mortimer died from sleeping pills that he had his wife smuggle to him in the hospital.

He was married to Mary Eleanor Johnston, and the couple had one son and one daughter.
