= Jack Lee (judge) =

Australian judge

Jack Austell Lee AO QC (1 July 1922 – 17 May 2006) was an Australian barrister and judge.

Lee was born in Wellington. He studied law at the University of Sydney and worked as a solicitor before being called to the Bar in 1945. Taking silk in 1961, he was appointed a justice of the Supreme Court of New South Wales in 1966. He was Chief Judge at Common Law from 1988, and was Royal Commissioner of the Blackburn Royal Commission from 1991 to 1992. He had three wives. After his first wife Sylvia Paris died he married June Rose Lee, but they divorced in 1975. He then went on to marry Nancy Rosemary Wolridge. Lee's other roles included Chairman of the Australians for Constitutional Monarchy Legal and Constitutional Committee from 1993 and Chairman of the Foundation for Australian Constitutional Research and Studies from 1995 to 1999.
