= Aubrey Luck =

Australian politician

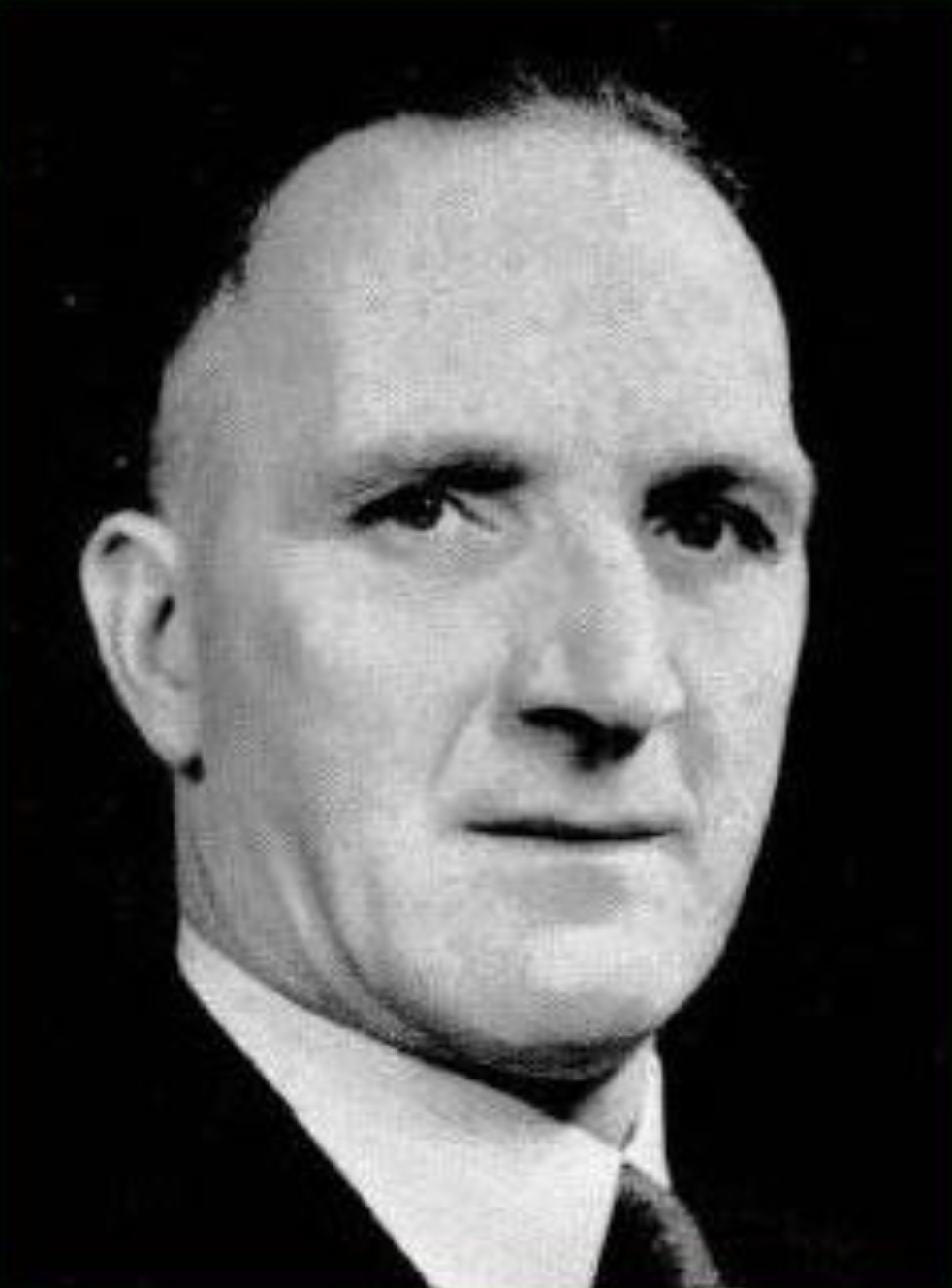

Member of the Australian Parliament for Darwin
- In office 28 April 1951 – 10 December 1955
- Preceded by: Enid Lyons
- Succeeded by: Division abolished

Member of the Australian Parliament for Braddon
- In office 10 December 1955 – 22 November 1958
- Preceded by: New seat
- Succeeded by: Ron Davies

Personal details
- Born: 14 November 1900 West Tamar, Tasmania
- Died: 9 June 1999 (aged 98)
- Party: Liberal Party of Australia
- Occupation: Hardware merchant

Aubrey William George Luck (14 November 1900 – 9 June 1999) was an Australian politician. Born in the West Tamar region of Tasmania, he was educated at state schools before becoming a hardware and building merchant in Devonport. He was involved in local politics as a member of Devonport Municipal Council. In 1951, he was elected to the Australian House of Representatives as the Liberal member for Darwin, succeeding the retiring Liberal member Dame Enid Lyons. He held the seat until its abolition in 1955, when he successfully contested the replacement seat of Braddon. He was defeated by Labor candidate Ron Davies in 1958. Luck died in 1999 at the age of 98.

Parliament of Australia
Preceded by Enid Lyons	Member for Darwin; 1951–1955	Succeeded by Division abolished
Preceded by New seat	Member for Braddon; 1955–1958	Succeeded by Ron Davies
