= 1954 Australian federal election =

Australian federal election

- 29 May 1954

All 123 (Note: The Northern Territory and Australian Capital Territory each had one seat, but members for the territories did not have full voting rights until 1966 and did not count toward government formation.) seats of the House of Representatives 61 seats were needed for a majority
- Registered: 5,096,468 ▲2.70%
- Turnout: 4,619,571 (96.09%) (Note: Turnout in contested seats) (▲0.09 pp)
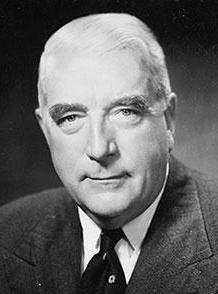

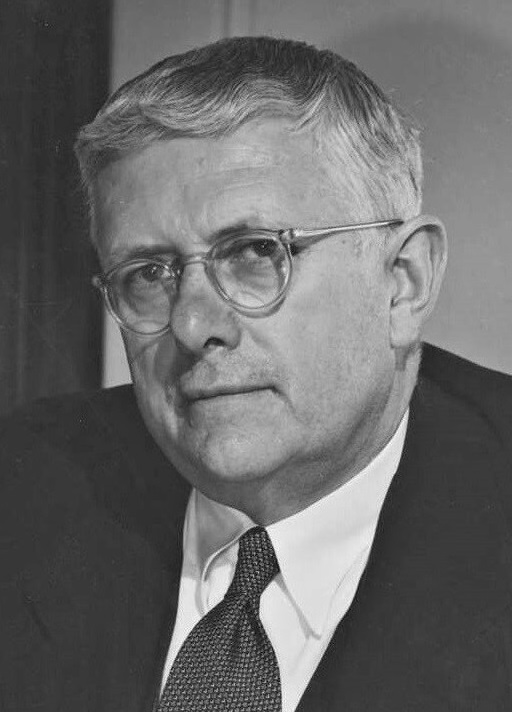
	First party	Second party
Leader	Robert Menzies	H. V. Evatt
Party	Liberal–Country; Coalition	Labor
Leader since	21 February 1945	13 June 1951
Leader's seat	Kooyong (Vic.)	Barton (NSW)
Last election	69 seats	52 seats
Seats won	64	57 + NT + ACT
Seat change	▼5	▲5
Primary vote	2,117,669	2,256,164
Percentage	47.57%	50.07%
Swing	▼2.77	▲2.44
TPP	49.30%	50.70%
TPP swing	▼1.40	▲1.40
- Results by division for the House of Representatives, shaded by winning party's margin of victory.
Prime Minister before election
Robert Menzies
Liberal/Country coalition
Subsequent Prime Minister
Robert Menzies
Liberal/Country coalition

A federal election was held in Australia on 29 May 1954. All 121 seats in the House of Representatives were up for election, but no Senate election took place. The incumbent Liberal–Country coalition led by Prime Minister Robert Menzies defeated the opposition Labor Party led by H. V. Evatt, despite losing the two-party preferred vote. Although the ALP won the two-party preferred vote, six Coalition seats were uncontested compared to one ALP seat. The Psephos blog makes clear that if all seats had been contested, the Coalition would have recorded a higher primary vote than the ALP and possibly also a higher two-party preferred vote.

This was the first federal election that future Prime Minister Gough Whitlam contested as a member of parliament, having entered parliament at the 1952 Werriwa by-election.

Though they did not win government, this election was the last time that the Labor party would achieve more than 50% of the primary vote. The only other time this happened was in 1914.

This was the first federal election to be held under the reign of Elizabeth II as Queen of Australia just two years after she succeeded her father.

== Issues ==
The election was complicated by the Petrov Affair, in which Vladimir Petrov, an attache to the Soviet embassy in Canberra, defected amidst a storm of publicity, claiming that there were Soviet spy rings within Australia. Given that the 1951 election had been fought over the issue of banning the Communist Party of Australia altogether, it is unsurprising that such a claim would gain credibility.

== Results ==
Labor: 57 seats Liberal: 47 seats Country: 17 seats

House of Reps (IRV) — 1954–55—Turnout 96.09% (CV) — Informal 1.35%
Party	First preference votes	%	Swing	Seats	Change
Labor	2,266,979	50.07	+2.44	59 (Note: Including Northern Territory and Australian Capital Territory)	+5
Liberal–Country coalition	2,153,970	47.57	–2.77	64	–5
Liberal	1,765,799	39.00	–1.62	47	–5
Country	388,171	8.57	–1.15	17	0
Communist	56,675	1.25	+0.27	0	0
Independents	50,027	1.11	+0.06	0	0
Total	4,527,651			121	
Two-party-preferred (estimated)
Liberal–Country coalition	Win	49.30	−1.40	64	−5
Labor		50.70	+1.40	59	+5

Notes

- Seven members were elected unopposed – three Liberal, three Country, and one Labor.
- See 1953 Australian Senate election for Senate composition.

First preference vote
Labor	50.07%
Liberal	39.00%
Country	8.52%
Communist	1.25%
Independent	1.10%

Two-party-preferred vote (estimated)
Labor	50.70%
Coalition	49.30%

Parliament seats
Coalition	52.89%
Labor	47.11%

== Seats changing hands ==
Seat	Pre-1954			Swing	Post-1954		
Seat	Party	Member	Margin	Swing	Margin	Member	Party
Bass, Tas	Liberal	Bruce Kekwick	3.4	4.4	1.0	Lance Barnard	Labor
Flinders, Vic	Labor	Keith Ewert	5.1	4.3	1.6	Robert Lindsay	Liberal
Griffith, Qld	Liberal	Doug Berry	3.7	4.1	0.4	Wilfred Coutts	Labor
St George, NSW	Liberal	Bill Graham	1.6	4.3	2.7	Nelson Lemmon	Labor
Sturt, SA	Liberal	Keith Wilson	2.4	5.4	3.0	Norman Makin	Labor
Swan, WA	Liberal	Bill Grayden	3.3	4.9	1.6	Harry Webb	Labor

== Aftermath ==
The third session of the 20th Parliament of the Commonwealth of Australia was officially opened by Her Majesty Queen Elizabeth II, Queen of Australia. This was the first time a reigning monarch had opened a session of parliament in Australia. The Queen wore her Coronation Dress to open the 20th session of parliament. The success of the 1954 Royal Tour of Australia (the first by a reigning sovereign), the recovery of the economy from a brief recession in 1951-52 and the Petrov Affair were all credited with assisting in the return of the government.

== See also ==
- Candidates of the Australian federal election, 1954
- Members of the Australian House of Representatives, 1954–1955
