= Electoral results for the Division of Fawkner =

Australian division election results

This is a list of electoral results for the Division of Fawkner in Australian federal elections from the division's creation in 1906 until its abolition in 1969.

== Members ==
Member	Party	Term
George Fairbairn	Ind. Protectionist	1906–1909
George Fairbairn	Liberal	1909–1913
Joseph Hannan	Labor	1913–1917
George Maxwell	Nationalist	1917–1929
George Maxwell	Independent Nationalist	1929–1929
George Maxwell	Australian	1929–1930
George Maxwell	Independent	1930–1931
George Maxwell	United Australia	1931–1935
Harold Holt	United Australia	1935–1945
Harold Holt	Liberal	1945–1949
Bill Bourke	Labor	1949–1955
Bill Bourke	Labor (A-C)	1955
Peter Howson	Liberal	1955–1969

== Election results ==
=== Elections in the 1960s ===
==== 1966 ====
1966 Australian federal election: Fawkner
Party	Candidate	Votes	%	±%
Liberal	Peter Howson	17,955	55.4	+0.9
Labor	Robert Vernon	8,883	27.4	−7.1
Democratic Labor	Yvonne Abolins	3,511	10.8	+2.6
Liberal Reform Group	George Gabriel	1,699	5.2	+5.2
Independent	Anthony Sanders	367	1.1	+1.1
Total formal votes		32,415	95.3	
Informal votes		1,586	4.7	
Turnout		34,001	92.5	
Two-party-preferred result
Liberal	Peter Howson		69.7	+6.1
Labor	Robert Vernon		30.3	−6.1
Liberal hold		Swing	+6.1	

==== 1963 ====
1963 Australian federal election: Fawkner
Party	Candidate	Votes	%	±%
Liberal	Peter Howson	18,614	54.5	+5.9
Labor	Gwendolyn Noad	11,774	34.5	−1.3
Democratic Labor	John Speed	2,818	8.2	−7.4
Independent	George Gabriel	966	2.8	+2.8
Total formal votes		34,172	98.1	
Informal votes		651	1.9	
Turnout		34,823	94.4	
Two-party-preferred result
Liberal	Peter Howson		63.6	+0.8
Labor	Gwendolyn Noad		36.4	−0.8
Liberal hold		Swing	+0.8	

==== 1961 ====
1961 Australian federal election: Fawkner
Party	Candidate	Votes	%	±%
Liberal	Peter Howson	16,580	48.6	+0.3
Labor	Gwendolyn Noad	12,223	35.8	+2.9
Democratic Labor	Richard Coyne	5,336	15.6	−3.1
Total formal votes		34,139	97.2	
Informal votes		987	2.8	
Turnout		35,126	93.0	
Two-party-preferred result
Liberal	Peter Howson	21,438	62.8	−2.0
Labor	Gwendolyn Noad	12,701	37.2	+2.0
Liberal hold		Swing	−2.0	

=== Elections in the 1950s ===
==== 1958 ====
1958 Australian federal election: Fawkner
Party	Candidate	Votes	%	±%
Liberal	Peter Howson	17,312	48.3	+2.1
Labor	George Smart	11,797	32.9	+6.4
Democratic Labor	Bill Bourke	6,709	18.7	−8.6
Total formal votes		35,818	97.3	
Informal votes		996	2.7	
Turnout		36,814	94.4	
Two-party-preferred result
Liberal	Peter Howson	23,198	64.8	+12.5
Labor	George Smart	12,620	35.2	+35.2
Liberal hold		Swing	+12.5	

==== 1955 ====
1955 Australian federal election: Fawkner
Party	Candidate	Votes	%	±%
Liberal	Peter Howson	17,645	46.2	−4.7
Labor (A-C)	Bill Bourke	10,450	27.3	+27.3
Labor	Patrick Thompson	10,132	26.5	−22.6
Total formal votes		38,227	97.0	
Informal votes		1,166	3.0	
Turnout		39,393	93.1	
Two-party-preferred result
Liberal	Peter Howson	19,992	52.3	+1.4
Labor (A-C)	Bill Bourke	18,235	47.7	−1.4
Liberal hold		Swing	+1.4	

==== 1954 ====
1954 Australian federal election: Fawkner
Party	Candidate	Votes	%	±%
Labor	Bill Bourke	18,038	50.2	−1.4
Liberal	Peter Howson	17,920	49.8	+2.2
Total formal votes		35,958	99.0	
Informal votes		378	1.0	
Turnout		36,336	95.5	
Labor hold		Swing	−1.8	

==== 1951 ====
1951 Australian federal election: Fawkner
Party	Candidate	Votes	%	±%
Labor	Bill Bourke	20,158	51.6	+1.6
Liberal	Peter Howson	18,586	47.6	−2.4
Independent	Colin Kennedy	332	0.8	+0.8
Total formal votes		39,076	98.3	
Informal votes		681	1.7	
Turnout		39,757	95.7	
Two-party-preferred result
Labor	Bill Bourke		52.0	+2.0
Liberal	Peter Howson		48.0	−2.0
Labor hold		Swing	+2.0	

=== Elections in the 1940s ===
==== 1949 ====
1949 Australian federal election: Fawkner
Party	Candidate	Votes	%	±%
Labor	Bill Bourke	20,228	50.0	+2.3
Liberal	Magnus Cormack	20,201	50.0	+1.8
Total formal votes		40,429	98.1	
Informal votes		782	1.9	
Turnout		41,211	95.2	
Labor hold		Swing	−0.8	

==== 1946 ====
1946 Australian federal election: Fawkner
Party	Candidate	Votes	%	±%
Liberal	Harold Holt	39,047	53.5	+20.1
Labor	Bill Bourke	30,835	42.2	+9.4
Independent	Mascotte Brown	2,121	2.9	+2.9
Services	Harold Rettig	1,042	1.4	+1.4
Total formal votes		73,045	97.1	
Informal votes		2,155	2.9	
Turnout		75,200	89.5	
Two-party-preferred result
Liberal	Harold Holt		56.2	−1.8
Labor	Bill Bourke		43.8	+1.8
Liberal hold		Swing	−1.8	

==== 1943 ====
1943 Australian federal election: Fawkner
Party	Candidate	Votes	%	±%
United Australia	Harold Holt	23,931	33.4	−27.4
Labor	Thomas Jude	23,508	32.8	−3.0
Independent	William Cremor	15,958	22.3	+22.3
Independent	Vernon Margetts	3,437	4.8	+4.8
Communist	Malcolm Good	3,300	4.6	+4.6
Independent	Charles Kennett	1,196	1.7	+1.7
Independent	Ruth Ravenscroft	381	0.5	+0.5
Total formal votes		71,711	95.6	
Informal votes		3,275	4.4	
Turnout		74,986	92.9	
Two-party-preferred result
United Australia	Harold Holt	41,602	58.0	−4.5
Labor	Thomas Jude	30,109	42.0	+4.5
United Australia hold		Swing	−4.5	

==== 1940 ====
1940 Australian federal election: Fawkner
Party	Candidate	Votes	%	±%
United Australia	Harold Holt	38,387	60.8	−5.7
Labor	Arthur Fraser	22,558	35.8	+7.4
Independent	Alexander Mills	2,152	3.4	+3.4
Total formal votes		63,097	98.0	
Informal votes		1,293	2.0	
Turnout		64,390	93.9	
Two-party-preferred result
United Australia	Harold Holt		62.5	+0.1
Labor	Arthur Fraser		37.5	−0.1
United Australia hold		Swing	+0.1	

=== Elections in the 1930s ===
==== 1937 ====
1937 Australian federal election: Fawkner
Party	Candidate	Votes	%	±%
United Australia	Harold Holt	33,277	55.1	−12.4
Labor	William Doran	17,124	28.4	+2.7
Independent	William Bottomley	9,941	16.5	+16.5
Total formal votes		60,342	97.4	
Informal votes		1,602	2.6	
Turnout		61,944	93.8	
Two-party-preferred result
United Australia	Harold Holt		62.4	−8.5
Labor	William Doran		37.6	+8.5
United Australia hold		Swing	−8.5	

1935 Fawkner by-election
Party	Candidate	Votes	%	±%
United Australia	Harold Holt	24,594	59.9	−6.6
Labor	Don Cameron	16,433	40.1	+12.4
Total formal votes		41,027	97.7	
Informal votes		946	2.3	
Turnout		41,973	87.4	
United Australia hold		Swing	−9.5	

==== 1934 ====
1934 Australian federal election: Fawkner
Party	Candidate	Votes	%	±%
United Australia	George Maxwell	30,029	66.5	−1.2
Labor	William Smith	12,515	27.7	+0.5
Social Credit	Frederick Paice	2,592	5.7	+5.7
Total formal votes		45,136	96.6	
Informal votes		1,569	3.4	
Turnout		46,705	93.7	
Two-party-preferred result
United Australia	George Maxwell		69.4	−0.9
Labor	William Smith		30.6	+0.9
United Australia hold		Swing	−0.9	

==== 1931 ====
1931 Australian federal election: Fawkner
Party	Candidate	Votes	%	±%
United Australia	George Maxwell	28,586	67.7	+29.3
Labor	John McKenna	11,508	27.2	+27.2
Independent	David Robertson	2,159	5.1	+5.1
Total formal votes		42,253	98.0	
Informal votes		880	2.0	
Turnout		43,133	93.1	
Two-party-preferred result
United Australia	George Maxwell		70.3	+21.7
Labor	John McKenna		29.7	+29.7
United Australia gain from Ind. Nationalist		Swing	+21.7	

=== Elections in the 1920s ===
==== 1929 ====
1929 Australian federal election: Fawkner
Party	Candidate	Votes	%	±%
Ind. Nationalist	George Maxwell	25,564	59.4	+59.4
Nationalist	Arthur Robinson	16,547	38.4	−23.3
Independent	James Ronald	950	2.2	+2.2
Total formal votes		43,061	98.7	
Informal votes		584	1.3	
Turnout		43,645	93.5	
Two-party-preferred result
Ind. Nationalist	George Maxwell		61.4	+61.4
Nationalist	Arthur Robinson		38.6	−23.1
Ind. Nationalist gain from Nationalist		Swing	+23.1	

==== 1928 ====
1928 Australian federal election: Fawkner
Party	Candidate	Votes	%	±%
Nationalist	George Maxwell	25,388	61.7	+2.3
Labor	Nicholas Roberts	15,731	38.3	−2.3
Total formal votes		41,119	96.8	
Informal votes		1,356	3.2	
Turnout		42,475	92.1	
Nationalist hold		Swing	+2.3	

==== 1925 ====
1925 Australian federal election: Fawkner
Party	Candidate	Votes	%	±%
Nationalist	George Maxwell	26,028	59.4	+7.2
Labor	Alfred Foster	17,809	40.6	−0.8
Total formal votes		43,837	98.8	
Informal votes		543	1.2	
Turnout		44,380	92.7	
Nationalist hold		Swing	+1.4	

==== 1922 ====
1922 Australian federal election: Fawkner
Party	Candidate	Votes	%	±%
Nationalist	George Maxwell	12,472	52.2	−6.3
Labor	Alfred Foster	9,881	41.4	+5.3
Liberal	John Murphy	1,533	6.4	+6.4
Total formal votes		23,886	96.9	
Informal votes		766	3.1	
Turnout		24,652	55.0	
Two-party-preferred result
Nationalist	George Maxwell		58.0	−5.5
Labor	Alfred Foster		42.0	+5.5
Nationalist hold		Swing	−5.5	

=== Elections in the 1910s ===
==== 1919 ====
1919 Australian federal election: Fawkner
Party	Candidate	Votes	%	±%
Nationalist	George Maxwell	15,819	51.5	+0.4
Labor	Joseph Hannan	14,927	48.5	+0.2
Total formal votes		30,746	99.2	
Informal votes		251	0.8	
Turnout		30,997	77.1	
Nationalist hold		Swing	+0.1	

==== 1917 ====
1917 Australian federal election: Fawkner
Party	Candidate	Votes	%	±%
Nationalist	George Maxwell	16,907	51.1	+10.4
Labor	Joseph Hannan	15,976	48.3	−11.0
Independent	Frank Henty	203	0.6	+0.6
Total formal votes		33,086	97.2	
Informal votes		959	2.8	
Turnout		34,045	84.7	
Nationalist gain from Labor		Swing	+10.7	

==== 1914 ====
1914 Australian federal election: Fawkner
Party	Candidate	Votes	%	±%
Labor	Joseph Hannan	17,483	59.3	+6.0
Liberal	Frank Carse	11,981	40.7	−6.0
Total formal votes		29,464	97.9	
Informal votes		626	2.1	
Turnout		30,090	75.7	
Labor hold		Swing	+6.0	

==== 1913 ====
1913 Australian federal election: Fawkner
Party	Candidate	Votes	%	±%
Labor	Joseph Hannan	16,643	53.3	+2.8
Liberal	George Fairbairn	14,610	46.7	−2.8
Total formal votes		31,253	97.7	
Informal votes		720	2.3	
Turnout		31,973	73.0	
Labor hold		Swing	+2.8	

==== 1910 ====
1910 Australian federal election: Fawkner
Party	Candidate	Votes	%	±%
Liberal	George Fairbairn	14,544	58.9	−8.3
Labour	Joseph Hannan	10,161	41.1	+8.3
Total formal votes		24,705	98.5	
Informal votes		379	1.5	
Turnout		25,084	60.6	
Liberal hold		Swing	−5.0	

=== Elections in the 1900s ===
==== 1906 ====
1906 Australian federal election: Fawkner
Party	Candidate	Votes	%	±%
Ind. Protectionist	George Fairbairn	12,212	60.5	+60.5
Labour	Thomas Smith	6,621	32.8	+32.8
Protectionist	John Miller	1,360	6.7	+6.7
Total formal votes		20,193	96.4	
Informal votes		759	3.6	
Turnout		20,952	57.3	
Ind. Protectionist win		(new seat)		
