= Don Cameron (Victorian politician) =

Australian politician

The Honourable Don Cameron
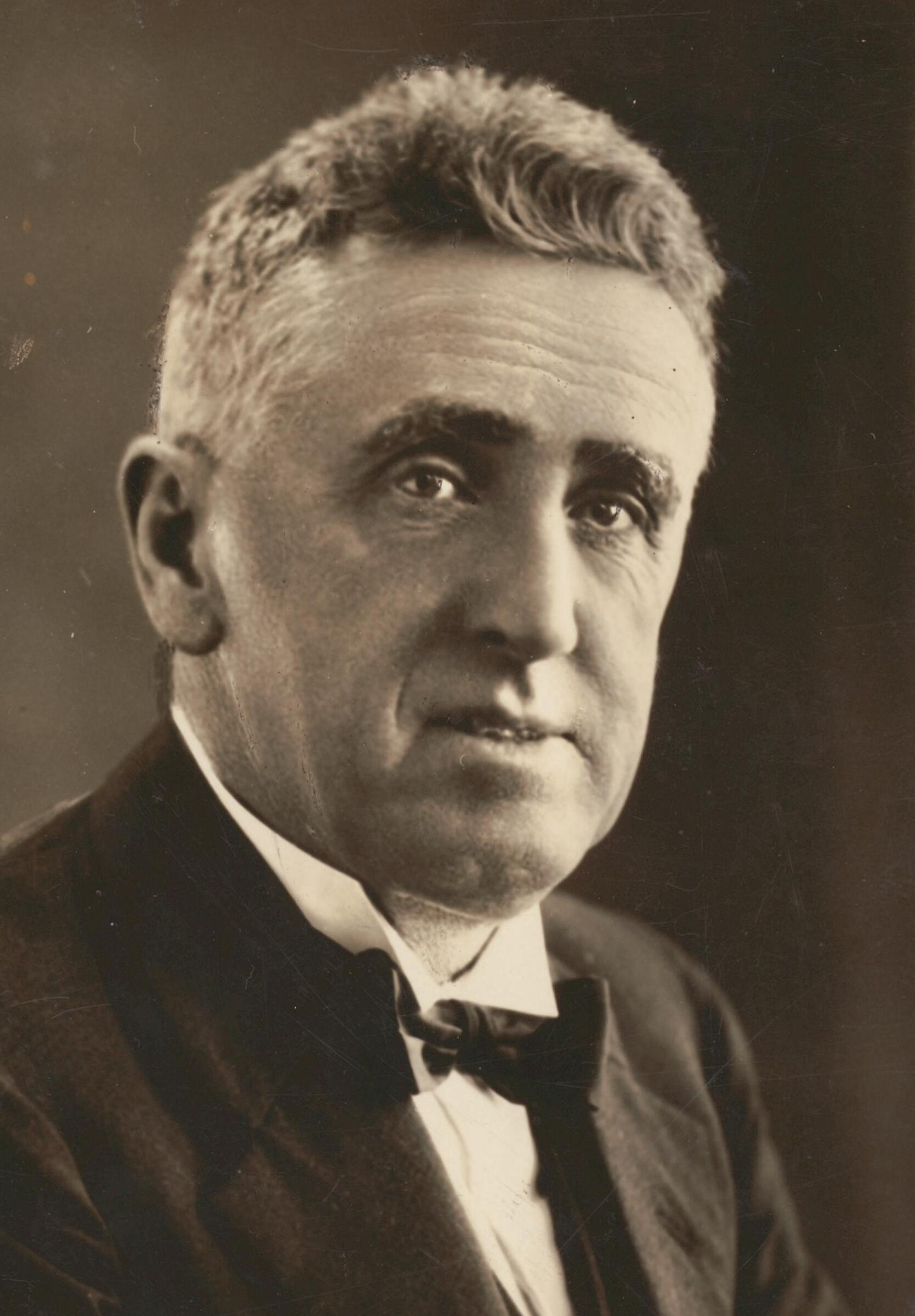

Postmaster-General of Australia
- In office 2 February 1945 – 19 December 1949
- Prime Minister: John Curtin; Frank Forde; Ben Chifley
- Preceded by: Bill Ashley
- Succeeded by: Larry Anthony

Minister for Aircraft Production
- In office 7 October 1941 – 2 February 1945
- Prime Minister: John Curtin
- Preceded by: John Leckie
- Succeeded by: Norman Makin

Senator for Victoria
- In office 1 July 1938 – 30 June 1962

Personal details
- Born: 19 January 1878 North Melbourne, Victoria, Australia
- Died: 20 August 1962 (aged 84) Malvern East, Victoria, Australia
- Party: Labor
- Other political affiliations: Victorian Socialist Party
- Spouse: Georgina Werrin (m. 1899)
- Occupation: Printer, plumber

Donald James Cameron (19 January 1878 – 20 August 1962) was an Australian politician who served as a Senator for Victoria from 1938 to 1962. He was a member of the Labor Party and served as Minister for Aircraft Production (1941–1945) and Postmaster-General (1945–1949) in the Curtin and Chifley governments.

== Early life ==
Cameron was born in North Melbourne of working-class parents and was educated at the City Road Primary School in South Melbourne and South Melbourne College. In 1895 he went to Western Australia to search for gold, but in fact became a printer for the Coolgardie Miner. In 1899, he returned to Melbourne and married Georgina Eliza Werrin. In 1901 and 1902 he served in the Australian Army in the Boer War and was wounded. He settled in Western Australia where he worked as a plumber and became an official of the plumbers' union and later secretary of the Trades Hall. Returning to Melbourne in 1919 he became active in the Victorian Socialist Party, a Marxist party. He was secretary of the Melbourne Trades Hall, editor of the Tramways Union newspaper and President of the Victorian Branch of the Australian Labor Party.

== Political career ==
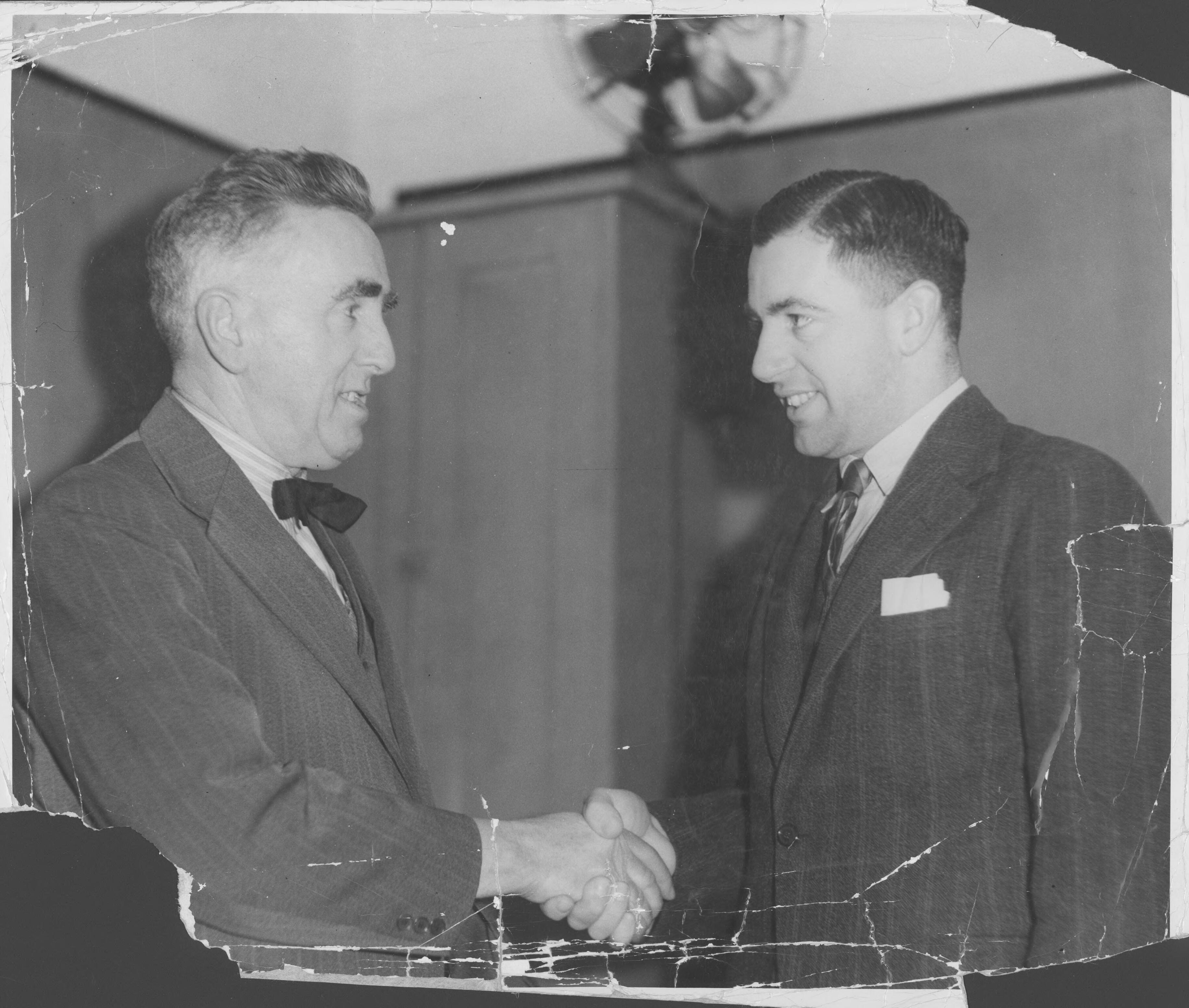
Cameron shaking hands with Harold Holt after losing the 1935 Fawkner by-election

Cameron ran unsuccessfully as the Labor candidate for election to the House of Representatives seats of Balaclava in 1929 and Fawkner in a by-election in 1935. He also was beaten for election to the Senate in 1931, but won in 1937. When John Curtin formed a Labor government in October 1941, Cameron became Minister for Aircraft Production in the wartime government. In the Chifley government from 1945 to 1949 he was Postmaster-General. From 1946 to 1949, he was Deputy Leader of the Labor Party in the Senate. Aged 71 when the Chifley government left office, he returned to the backbench, and did not stand for re-election at the 1961 election, being very deaf. He was the last serving parliamentarian who had fought in the Boer War.

Cameron died less than two months after the expiration of his term, in the Melbourne suburb of Malvern East. He was survived by his wife and three sons.

Political offices
| Preceded by John Leckie | Minister for Aircraft Production; 1941–1945 | Succeeded by Norman Makin |
| Preceded by Bill Ashley | Postmaster-General; 1945–1949 | Succeeded by Larry Anthony |
