= Peter Howson (politician) =

Australian politician

The Honourable Peter Howson CMG
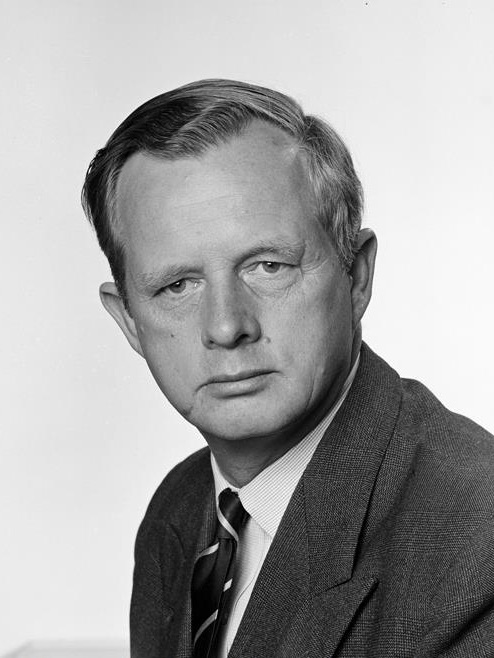
- Peter Howson, ca. 1971

Minister for the Environment, Aborigines and the Arts
- In office 31 May 1971 – 5 December 1972
- Prime Minister: William McMahon
- Preceded by: New office
- Succeeded by: Moss Cass

Minister for Air
- In office 10 June 1964 – 28 February 1968
- Prime Minister: Sir Robert Menzies; Harold Holt; John McEwen; John Gorton
- Preceded by: David Fairbairn
- Succeeded by: Gordon Freeth

Member of the Australian Parliament for Casey
- In office 25 October 1969 – 2 December 1972
- Preceded by: New seat
- Succeeded by: Race Mathews

Member of the Australian Parliament for Fawkner
- In office 10 December 1955 – 25 October 1969
- Preceded by: Bill Bourke
- Succeeded by: Abolished

Personal details
- Born: 22 May 1919 London, England
- Died: 1 February 2009 (aged 89) Geelong, Victoria, Australia
- Party: Liberal
- Relations: George A. Howson (father); George J. Howson (grandfather)
- Education: Trinity College, Cambridge
- Awards: Mentioned in Dispatches

Military service
- Allegiance: United Kingdom
- Branch/service: Royal Navy
- Years of service: 1940–1946

Peter Howson CMG (22 May 1919 – 1 February 2009) was an Australian politician who served in the House of Representatives from 1955 to 1972, representing the Liberal Party. He was Minister for Air from 1964 to 1968 and Minister for the Environment, Aborigines and the Arts from 1971 to 1972.

== Early life ==
Howson was born in London, England, the son of Jessie and George Arthur Howson. His father was a British Army officer, while his grandfather George John Howson was an Anglican archdeacon. Howson was educated at Stowe School and Trinity College, Cambridge. During World War II, he served in the Royal Naval Volunteer Reserve as a pilot from 1940 to 1946, and was Mentioned in Despatches for his service. He was shot down while flying a Fairey Albacore over Malta for the Fleet Air Arm, as he and four Hawker Hurricanes were surprised by 70 German planes. This gave him a deep and long scar on his face.

== Political career ==
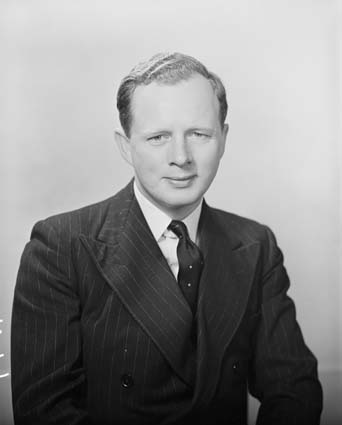
Howson in 1956.

Howson was the Liberal member for the House of Representatives seat of Fawkner from his defeat of Bill Bourke at the 1955 election until its abolition before the 1969 election. He was then elected as the member for Casey. He was appointed Minister for Air in June 1964 in Robert Menzies' last ministry.

In 1967, Howson was caught up in the VIP affair, which saw allegations that the government had misused the VIP aircraft fleet for ministers' private purposes. When asked to table records on the fleet's movements, Holt and Howson refused and implied that they did not exist, but Senator John Gorton later found that the records did exist and tabled them in the Senate. When Gorton became Prime Minister on 10 January 1968, he retained all of the previous ministers in his ministry, but after he won a seat in the House of Representatives he carried out a Cabinet reshuffle on 28 February 1968 and dropped Howson from the ministry.

Expecting to be rewarded for his support of McMahon during Gorton's ministry, Howson was disappointed when he was appointed as Australia's first Minister for the Environment, Aborigines and the Arts. He was reported as commenting: "The little bastard gave me trees, boongs and pooftas". However, according to Rob Chalmers, he subsequently "showed great energy and concern to improve the lot of Aborigines".

Howson was defeated by Labor's Race Mathews at the 1972 election.

== Later life ==
In 1973, Howson founded the Deafness Foundation Victoria.

In 1984, Howson published a diary (edited by Don Aitkin) recording the events during his period as a parliamentarian and as a minister. According to Rob Chalmers, it was "one of the most informative and interesting books on Australian postwar politics ever published".

Howson was active as a commentator on Indigenous matters, strongly supporting their cultural assimilation while deriding the Stolen Generations as a "silly fairy tale".

Howson died in Geelong in 2009, aged 89, after suffering complications from a fall.

== Honours ==
Howson was appointed a Companion of the Order of St Michael and St George in 1980 for services to Parliament. He was also awarded the Centenary Medal in 2001 for long and devoted service to improving conditions for Australia's indigenous people.

== Notes ==
Political offices
| Preceded by David Fairbairn | Minister for Air; 1964–68 | Succeeded by Gordon Freeth |
| New title | Minister for the Environment, Aborigines and the Arts; 1971–72 | Succeeded by Gough Whitlam |
Parliament of Australia
| Preceded by Bill Bourke | Member for Fawkner; 1955–69 | Division abolished |
| New division | Member for Casey; 1969–72 | Succeeded by Race Mathews |
