= 1935 Fawkner by-election =

- 17 August 1935

The Fawkner seat in the House of Representatives
- Turnout: 41,973 (87.4%)
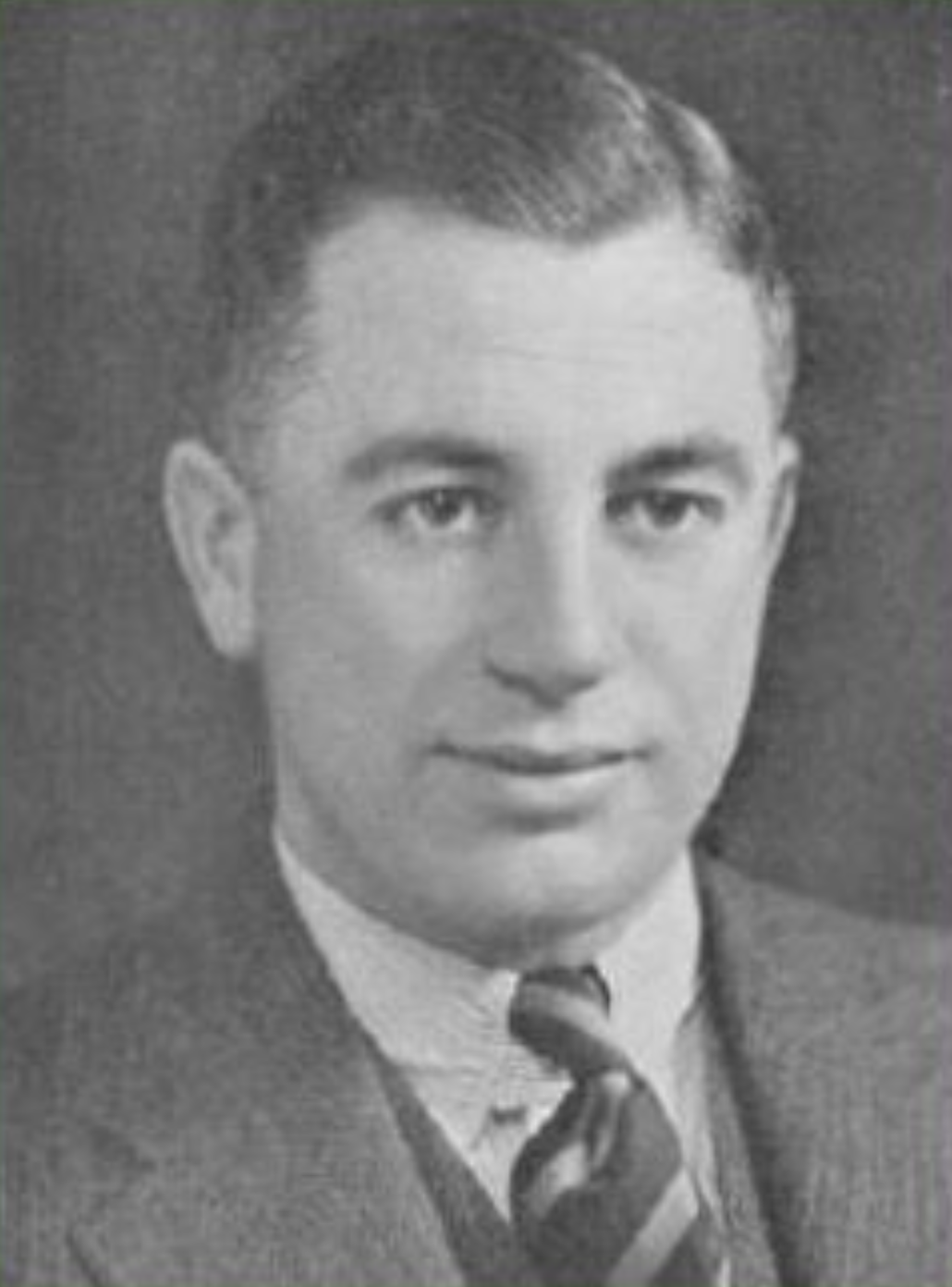

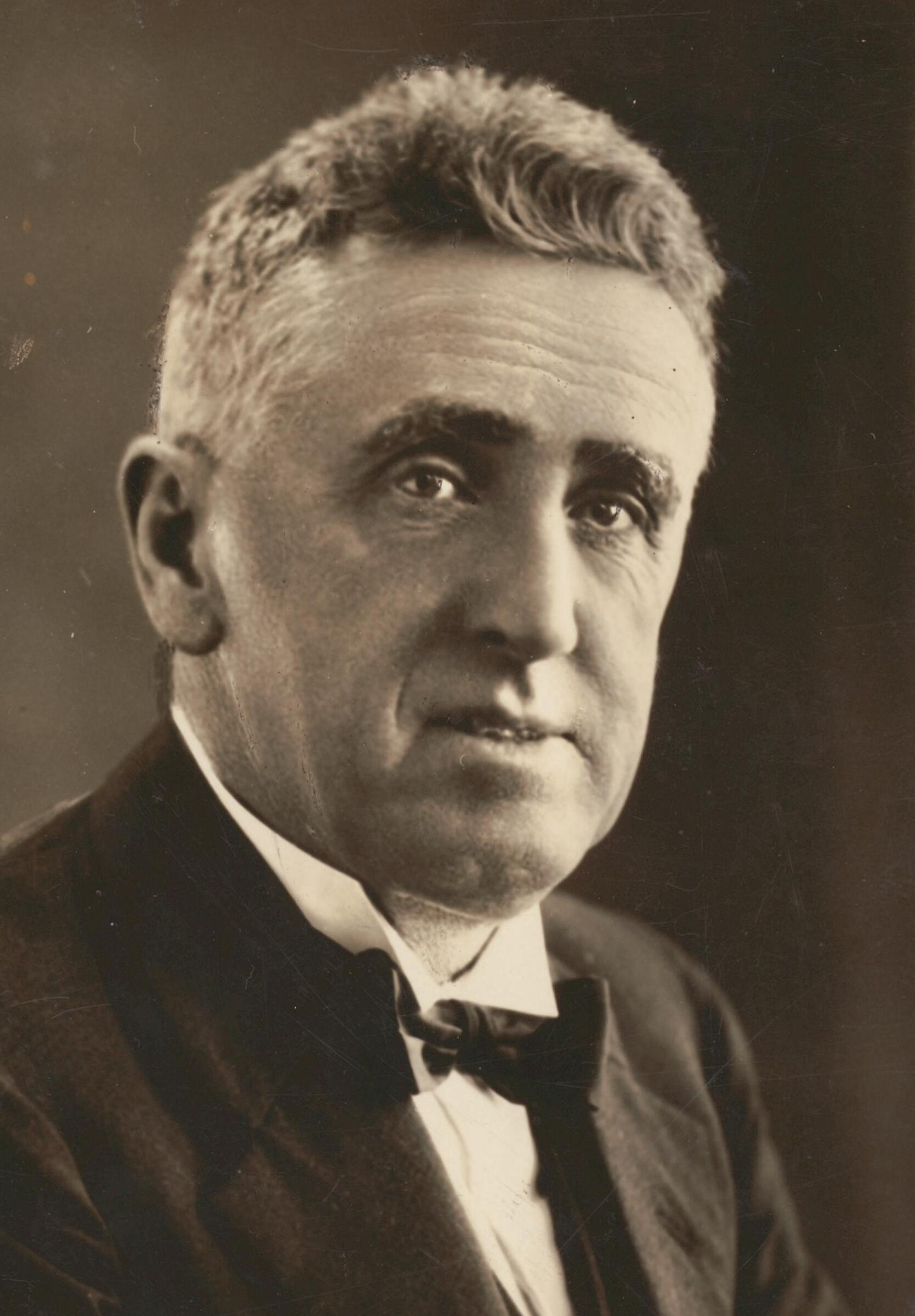
| | First party | Second party |
|---|---|---|
| Candidate | Harold Holt | Don Cameron |
| Party | United Australia | Labor |
| Popular vote | 24,594 | 16,433 |
| Percentage | 59.9% | 40.1% |
| Swing | ▼6.6 | ▲12.4 |
MP before election
George Maxwell
United Australia
Elected MP
Harold Holt
United Australia

A by-election was held for the Australian House of Representatives seat of Fawkner on 17 August 1935. This was triggered by the death of United Australia Party (UAP) MP George Maxwell.

The by-election was won by UAP candidate and future Prime Minister Harold Holt.

== Results ==
Fawkner by-election, 1935
| Party | Candidate | Votes | % | ±% |
|---|---|---|---|---|
| United Australia | Harold Holt | 24,594 | 59.9 | −6.6 |
| Labor | Don Cameron | 16,433 | 40.1 | +12.4 |
| Total formal votes | | 41,027 | 97.7 | |
| Informal votes | | 946 | 2.3 | |
| Turnout | | 41,973 | 87.4 | |
| United Australia hold | | Swing | −9.5 | |
