= Don Whitington =

Australian political journalist and author (1911–1977)

Bertram Lindon "Don" Whitington (31 January 1911 – 5 May 1977) was an Australian political journalist and author.

== Life ==
A member of the Whitington family of South Australia, whose family arrived in Australia in 1840, Don Whitington was born in Ballarat and grew up in Tasmania. He worked as a jackaroo in New South Wales before he moved to Sydney in 1933 and began working as a journalist. In 1941 he was appointed to head the Canberra office of the Sydney Daily Telegraph, and thereafter he remained based in Canberra. In 1947 he founded the newsletter Inside Canberra (https://insidecanberra.com), which has been published ever since, currently by Keating Media Pty Ltd. He and his business partner Eric White began a media company, and in the 1950s they founded two newspapers, the Northern Territory News and the Mount Isa Mail, both of which they later sold to Rupert Murdoch.

Whitington wrote several books on federal politics and two novels. In 1968 he wrote a series of articles for The Age on the political, racial and economic problems faced by the then Australian territory of Papua New Guinea. His unfinished autobiography was published the year after he died of a heart attack.

His first marriage, of 1936, produced three children but ended in divorce. He married again in 1974.

== Books ==
- The House Will Divide: A Review of Australian Federal Politics (1954, 1969)
- Ring the Bells: A Dictionary of Australian Federal Politics (1956)
- Treasure Upon the Earth (1957) (novel)
- Mile Pegs (1963) republished in 1978 under the title King Hit (novel)
- The Rulers: Fifteen Years of the Liberals (1964)
- In Search of an Australian (1967)
- The Effluent Society: Pollution in Australia (1970)
- Inside Canberra: A Guide to Australian Federal Politics (1971) (written with Rob Chalmers)
- The Menzies Era and After, 1949–1970 (1972)
- Twelfth Man? (1972)
- The Witless Men (1975)
- Strive to Be Fair: An Unfinished Autobiography (1978)
