= Don Aitkin =

Australian political scientist (1937–2022)

- Born: Donald Alexander Aitkin; 1937
- Died: 12 April 2022 (aged 84–85)
- Occupation: Chair of the Multi-Disciplinary Assessment Committee for the Canada Foundation for Innovation
- Known for: Chairman of the Australian Research Council

Don Aitkin AO (1937–2022) was an Australian political scientist, writer, and administrator. Until 2012 he was Chairman of Australia’s National Capital Authority. He served as Vice-Chancellor and President of the University of Canberra from 1991 to 2002, and as Vice-President of the Australian Vice-Chancellors Committee in 1994 and 1995. He played an influential role in the evolution of national policies for research and higher education from the mid-1980s, when he was the Chairman of the Australian Research Grants Committee, a member of the Australian Science and Technology Council, and Chairman of the Board of the Institute of Advanced Studies at the Australian National University. Appointed as the first Chairman of the Australian Research Council in 1988, he established the new body as a national research council of world class; its funding trebled during his term of office. He was made an Officer of the Order of Australia in 1998.

== Biography ==
=== Education ===
He was educated first in History, receiving a Master of Arts with First Class Honours at the University of New England in 1961 (the first such degree to be awarded at that University), and moved to Political Science for his PhD (ANU, 1964). The winning of a traveling postdoctoral fellowship then took him to Oxford. He also worked at the Institute of Social Research at the University of Michigan at Ann Arbor before returning to Australia as a Research Fellow at the ANU. He was appointed the Foundation Professor of Politics at Macquarie University in 1971, and returned once more to the ANU in 1980 as Professor of Political Science in the Department in which he studied for his PhD.

=== Post-graduate career ===
He has written or edited thirteen books, one of them a novel, another a family memoir and the remainder all focusing on one or other aspect of Australian history, politics and education. His recent What Was It All For? The Reshaping of Australia, published in 2005, was widely discussed, and his books on the Country Party and on Australian political behaviour are now authoritative. He was elected a Fellow of the Academy of the Social Sciences in Australia in 1975, one of the youngest Fellows ever elected, a Fellow of the Australian College of Educators in 1995, and an Honorary Fellow of the Royal Australian Planning Institute in 2001. The University of Canberra awarded him the degree of Doctor of the University, honoris causa, in 2002 and made him a Professor Emeritus; the University of New England awarded him the degree of Doctor of Letters, honoris causa, in 2004. Don Aitkin played a leading role in the establishment of the Australian Consortium for Social and Political Research Inc., serving as its President from 1984 to 1986, and of the Asia-Pacific Political Science Association, serving as its Secretary-General from 1983 to 1986. He was the President of the Australasian Political Studies Association in 1979 and a long-running Treasurer (1981 to 1986).

Don Aitkin became well known in Australia in the 1970s, both as a widely read columnist in the now defunct National Times and as a television commentator. He is a columnist for The Australian Financial Review, and served for a year as Contributing Editor of Newsweek. In his youth a keen tennis and squash player (University Blue for Squash Racquets, 1964), he is now more interested in music and bushwalking. Born in 1937 in Sydney, he has spent more than half his life in Canberra, where he was a Councillor of the Canberra Business Council for nearly twelve years, and is an Honorary Ambassador for the ACT, the Chairman of the NRMA/ACT Road Safety Trust, the Chairman of the Cultural Facilities Corporation, the President of Pro Musica Inc, and a member of the Ministerial Tourism Advisory Council. He was a Director of ArtSound FM between 2004 and 2006. He was Chairman of the Canberra-based R&D company Agrecon for eleven years and acted as its CEO for a few months in 2002 and 2003. He was the Chairman of the Australian Mathematics Trust from 1992 to 2004 and of the National Olympiad Council (the body organising Australian involvement in the mathematical, physics, chemistry, biology and informatics Olympiads) from 1997 to 2004. At the request of the ACT Government he chaired the Schools Legislation Review in the ACT in 1999 and 2000. In the last decade he has become involved in research policy work in Canada, serving as the Chair of the Multi-Disciplinary Assessment Committee for the Canada Foundation for Innovation, and as a member both of the Blue Ribbon Panel of Canada’s Social Sciences and Humanities Research Council and a Canada Excellence Research Chairs committee.

== Family ==
He and his late wife Beverley, who served as a clinical nurse consultant and was in senior management roles at a Canberra hospital. He fathered 5 children of his own, 4 from his first marriage, 1 with his second wife before settling down for the rest of his life with Beverly who had 4 children of her own.

== Bibliography ==
- The Colonel : a political biography of Sir Michael Bruxner. Canberra: Australian National University Press. 1969.
- The Country Party in New South Wales: A Study of Organisation and Support (1972)
- Stability and Change in Australian Politics (1977; 2nd edition 1982)
- The Second Chair (1977) (novel)
- Australian Political Institutions (1980; 10th edition 2015)
- Surveys of Australian Political Science (1984)
- The Howson Diaries: The Life of Politics (1984) (editor)
- "The astonishing rise of higher education". Quadrant. 40 (1–2 [323]): 77‒82. January–February 1996.
- What Was It All For? The Reshaping of Australia (2005)
- Edna and Alec (2006)
- The Canonbury Tales (2014) (stories)
- Turning Point (2015) (novel)
- Nobody’s Hero (2016) (novel)
