= Bill Bourke (politician) =

Australian politician (1913–1981)

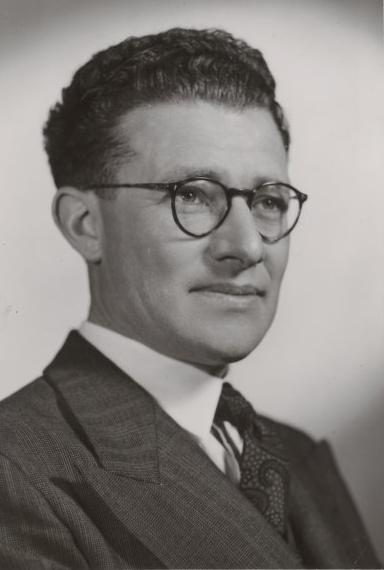

Member of the Australian Parliament for Fawkner
- In office 10 December 1949 – 10 December 1955
- Preceded by: Harold Holt
- Succeeded by: Peter Howson

Personal details
- Born: 2 June 1913
- Died: 22 May 1981 (aged 67)
- Party: Labor (1949–55); Labor (A-C) (1955)

William Meskill Bourke (2 June 1913 – 22 May 1981) was an Australian politician.

Bourke was elected to the Australian House of Representatives seat of Fawkner at the 1949 election representing the Australian Labor Party. He was expelled from the Labor Party in 1955 for belonging to the Industrial Groups (Groupers) and joined the Australian Labor Party (Anti-Communist), later renamed the Democratic Labor Party. He was defeated at the 1955 election by Peter Howson. He was educated at St Kevin's College, Melbourne.

== Notes ==
Parliament of Australia
Preceded by Harold Holt	Member for Fawkner; 1949–1955	Succeeded by Peter Howson
