= Rob Chalmers =

Australian political journalist

- Image by Heide Smith

Robin Donald Chalmers (14 July 1929 – 27 July 2011) was an independent Australian political journalist and commentator. The Canberra Press Gallery's longest serving member, from 1951 to 2011, his career spanned over 60 years reporting on the Parliament of Australia. Chiefly using the mediums of print and radio, his audience consisted mainly of other well-informed interested parties in the media, politics, industry and government, not a face often seen by the mainstream general public; he was, as described by the prime minister of Australia, Julia Gillard, "a journalist's journalist" . In the later half of Chalmers career, he was best known for his roles with the independent, economic and political, weekly newsletter Inside Canberra.

Chalmer's lasting legacy are his unmatched milestones in Australian history of a fifty, and then a further sixty-year career working within the walls of Parliament House. Both were given a mention, and officially recorded in the hansard of parliamentary sessions of the dates 7 March 2001 in The Australian House of Representatives and 8 March 2001 in The Australian Senate. Motion of Condolences upon his death were made on 16 August 2011, in The House of Representatives, and in The Senate on 17 August 2011. An indication of the respect in which Chalmers was held in the Parliament is evident in the statements made both by Gillard and leader of the opposition Tony Abbott. Abbott's condolence motion on 16 August stated; "Rob Chalmers was not the father of the House, but he was certainly the father of the press gallery. And while the gallery does not run this country, it certainly has a vast influence on this House."

== Career ==
Chalmers first started work in The Federal Press Galley in Old Parliament House, Canberra as a cadet on 7 March 1951, with Sydney newspaper: The Daily Mirror, and was an active member of The Press Gallery for the next sixty years. President of the National Press Club (Australia) at a time, owner of Australian Press Services (see Publications), radio presenter with 2CH, Chalmer's veteran career as a journalist saw him be an editor, author and commentator in many forms, but Chalmer's later focus was writing and editing a weekly, four-page, independent newsletter Inside Canberra. First published in 1947 by Don Whitington, Chalmers started working with Inside Canberra in 1957, and took over after Whitington's death in the mid-seventies. Chalmers worked on Inside Canberra until two weeks before his own death, and was also in the midst of publishing a book, which was published later in 2011 called; Inside The Canberra Press Gallery: Life in the Wedding Cake of Old Parliament House.

== Personal life ==
Born in Sydney on Bastille Day to fitter and turner Robin 'Bobby' Chalmers and Janet, the daughter of a NSW country union organiser, Chalmers, an only child, was christened at Chalmers Presbyterian Church in Chalmers Street, Sydney. His father was a champion swimmer, receiving medals from the Royal Shipwreck Relief & Humane Society of New South Wales and Surf Life Saving Australia for a rescue at North Bondi. His uncle John 'Jack' Chalmers Jack Chalmers, was also a lifesaving champion of his time, receiving the Bronze Albert Medal (sea), and a George Cross, for his efforts in rescuing Milton Coughlan from a shark at Coogee Beach on 4 February 1922, aided by Frank Beaurepaire. Chalmers himself swam regularly into the final year of his life. He was also for a time, president of the Royal Canberra Golf Club Chalmers had two children, Susan and Robin, to his first wife Lesley, his second wife was Jenny Hutchison with whom he later co-authored a book with; "Inside Canberra: A guide to Australian Federal Politics". The last 16 years of his life were spent with wife Gloria, who was his 'first-love' from the 1940s in Sydney, reuniting in later life. Chalmers was survived by Gloria, his two children, three step children, and their families. His three wives, family and many friends and colleagues were present at a celebration of his life hosted in his honour by the National Press Club.

== Books ==
Inside Canberra: A Guide to Australian Federal Politics Don Whitington and Rob Chalmers, Rigby, Adelaide, 1971 : ISBN 0-85179-148-4

Inside Canberra: A guide to Australian Federal Politics Rob Chalmers and Jenny Hutchison, Currey O'Neil, Melbourne, 1983 : ISBN 978-0-85902-353-5

Inside The Canberra Press Gallery: Life in the Wedding Cake of Old Parliament House Rob Chalmers, ANU EPress, Canberra, 2011 : ISBN 978-1-921862-36-6

Download here. https://press-files.anu.edu.au/downloads/press/p144911/html/Text/upfront.html?referer=&page=0

== Publications ==
Inside Canberra (Journal, e-Newsletter and online archive) Keating Media Pty Ltd: http://insidecanberra.com

Money Matters (Journal), Canberra : Australian Press Services.

Inside Canberra's guide to federal parliament (Journal) Rob Chalmers, Canberra : Australian Press Services, 38th Parliament, 1st ed. (1996)-38th Parliament, 2nd ed. (1997)

Canberra Survey (Journal), Canberra : Australian Press Services.

National Reporter (Journal), Canberra : Australian Press Services.

Rural Australia (Journal), Canberra : Australian Press Services, 1981-1981.

Primary Industry Newsletter (Journal), Canberra : Australian Press Services.

Primary Industry Survey (Journal), Canberra : Australian Press Services.

Defence Industry & Aerospace Report (Journal), Canberra : Australian Press Services.

Business Insight (Journal), Canberra : Australian Press Services.

Transport & Distribution Letter (Journal), Canberra : Australian Press Services.

The House Magazine (Journal) Canberra : House Magazine Pty. Ltd, 1982–2000.

Guide to Federal Parliament: thirty seventh Parliament : Budget session 1995 Jenny Hutchison, Rob Chalmers Canberra : Australian Press Services, 1995
