= George Maxwell (Australian politician) =

Australian lawyer and politician

George Maxwell KC
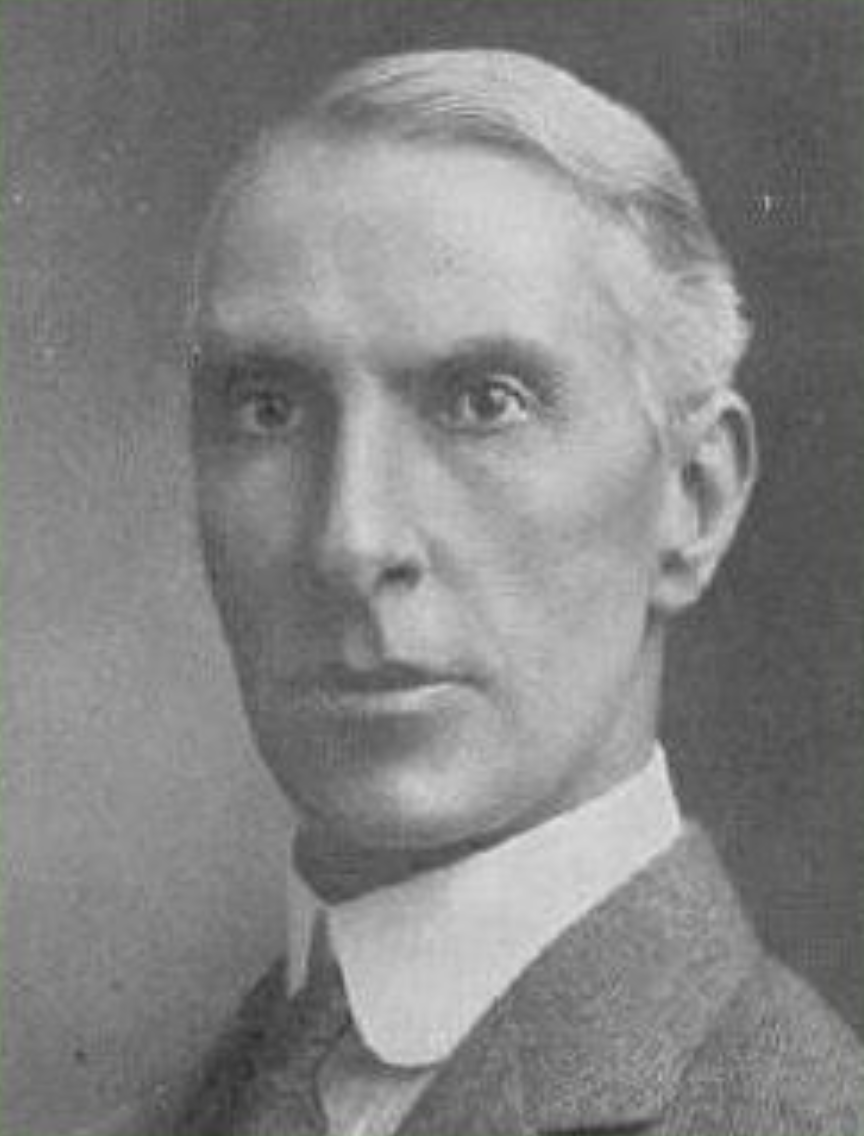

Member of the Australian Parliament for Fawkner
- In office 5 May 1917 – 25 June 1935
- Preceded by: Joseph Hannan
- Succeeded by: Harold Holt

Personal details
- Born: 30 April 1859 Montrose, Scotland
- Died: 25 June 1935 (aged 76) Canterbury, Victoria
- Party: Nationalist (1917–29); Australian Party (1929–30); Independent (1930–31); UAP (1931–35)
- Spouse: Jean Russell Ross (m. 1896)
- Relations: Ulrich Ellis (son-in-law)
- Occupation: Criminal lawyer

George Arnot Maxwell (30 April 1859 – 25 June 1935) was an Australian lawyer and politician. He was one of Melbourne's leading barristers, specialising in criminal law. He was also a member of the House of Representatives from 1917 until his death in 1935.

== Early life ==
Maxwell was born on 30 April 1859 in Montrose, Forfarshire, Scotland. He was the second of five sons born to Margaret (née Arnot) and David Skinner Maxwell, a Jamaican-born Presbyterian minister. His paternal grandmother Ann Maxwell (née Giscome) was the daughter of a slave-owner and free woman of colour; she married Scottish-born James Maxwell, who was a pioneering researcher into tropical diseases and became the first custos rotulorum of Metcalfe Parish, Jamaica.

Maxwell was educated in Fife. He migrated to Australia with his family in 1875. He worked briefly as a jackaroo and then completed his matriculation in Melbourne in 1881.

He subsequently taught at Melbourne schools, including Caulfield Grammar School, while studying arts and law at the University of Melbourne, where from 1884 he was a student of Trinity College. His early training and experiences for his later career as a barrister and politician can be seen in his student activities. In July 1884, he was, along with Trinity student Ernest Selwyn Hughes, a founder of the Shakspeare [sic] Society at the University of Melbourne, and he won the Sir Wigram Allen Prize for Oratory awarded by the Trinity College Dialectic Society in December the same year. In 1889, Maxwell was appointed Prelector of the College's debating society.

== Barrister ==
Maxwell was admitted to the Victorian Bar in 1891 and developed a successful legal practice specialising in criminal law. He was eventually appointed King's Counsel (KC) in 1926. Arthur Dean regarded him as "beyond all question the greatest [Victorian] criminal advocate of modern times" and Robert Menzies described him as "the greatest criminal advocate I ever heard".

One of Maxwell's most notable cases was the Gun Alley Murder trial of 1921, where he had Tom Brennan as his junior. His client Colin Campbell Ross was convicted of the murder of a 12-year-old girl and subsequently executed, in what came to be regarded as a miscarriage of justice.

== Political career ==
Maxwell ran unsuccessfully for various Victorian Legislative Assembly seats: Collingwood in 1891; Prahran in 1897; Warrnambool in 1900; Carlton in 1902 and Evelyn in 1914.

Maxwell was elected to the House of Representatives as a Nationalist at the 1917 federal election, winning the seat of Fawkner from the incumbent Australian Labor Party (ALP) MP Joseph Hannan. After the "No" vote at the 1917 Australian conscription referendum he was involved in negotiating a compromise that allowed Prime Minister Billy Hughes to stay in office, despite a promise to resign if the "No" vote succeeded. He supported the expulsion of Hugh Mahon from parliament in 1920 over his statements criticising the British Empire, as one of only three Nationalists to speak on the motion (alongside Hughes and James Fowler).

After the 1922 election produced a hung parliament, Maxwell counselled Hughes to stand aside as prime minister on a temporary basis and seek to return at a later date. He disapproved of the subsequent coalition agreement between the Nationalists and Country Party which saw S. M. Bruce replace Hughes as prime minister. During the Bruce–Page government he crossed the floor on a number of occasions, including to oppose the 1927 Financial Agreement on state debts. Following the 1928 election Maxwell joined a group of dissident Nationalists led by Hughes. He crossed the floor to vote against the government's Maritime Services Bill in August 1929, which Bruce took as a motion of no confidence and called an early election.

Maxwell was refused Nationalist endorsement for the 1929 election, but recontested his seat as an "independent Nationalist" and defeated the endorsed Nationalist candidate, helped by Labor's decision not to run in the seat. In October 1929 he joined Hughes' new Australian Party, becoming one of its five parliamentary members alongside Hughes, Walter Duncan, Walter Marks, and Walter Massy-Greene. However, from the start of the new party he was "uneasey with Hughes's bias towards Labor and open hostility to the Nationalist Party". On 19 May 1930, Maxwell wrote to Hughes to withdraw from the Australian Party and communicate his intent to return to the Nationalists, although he did not immediately make his intentions public.

Maxwell joined the United Australia Party (UAP) – a merger of the Nationalists and dissident Labor MPs – upon its creation in May 1931. He was re-elected as a UAP candidate at the 1931 and 1934 elections.

== Personal life ==
Maxwell married Jean Russell Ross in 1896—they had four daughters and one son. Maxwell lost sight in one eye in 1920 and most of the sight in the other in 1921, becoming totally blind in 1929. Following his death at home in the Melbourne suburb of Canterbury, his seat of Fawkner was won by future Prime Minister Harold Holt.

== See also ==
- List of Caulfield Grammar School people

== Notes ==
Parliament of Australia
Preceded by Joseph Hannan	Member for Fawkner; 1917 – 1935	Succeeded by Harold Holt
