= Division of Fawkner =

Former Australian federal electoral division

Fawkner Australian House of Representatives Division
- Created: 1906
- Abolished: 1969
- Namesake: John Fawkner

The Division of Fawkner was an Australian Electoral Division in Victoria. The division was created in 1906 as a replacement for Southern Melbourne, and was abolished itself in 1969. It was named for John Fawkner, one of the founders of Melbourne. It was located in the inner southern suburbs of Melbourne, including at various times Prahran, South Yarra, St Kilda and Toorak. It was usually a safe conservative seat, but was occasionally won by the Australian Labor Party.

The seat is best known as the starting point for the career of future Prime Minister Harold Holt, who held the seat from 1935 until 1949, when he followed most of its wealthier portion into Higgins.

== Members ==
Image	Member	Party	Term	Notes
	George Fairbairn (1855–1943)	Independent Protectionist	12 December 1906 – 26 May 1909	Previously held the Victorian Legislative Assembly seat of Toorak. Lost seat. Later elected to the Senate in 1917
	George Fairbairn (1855–1943)	Liberal	26 May 1909 – 31 May 1913	Previously held the Victorian Legislative Assembly seat of Toorak. Lost seat. Later elected to the Senate in 1917
	Joseph Hannan (1873–1943)	Labor	31 May 1913 – 5 May 1917	Previously held the Victorian Legislative Assembly seat of Albert Park. Lost seat. Later appointed to the Senate in 1924
	George Maxwell (1859–1935)	Nationalist	5 May 1917 – September 1929	Died in office
	George Maxwell (1859–1935)	Independent Nationalist	September 1929 – 2 December 1929	Died in office
	George Maxwell (1859–1935)	Australian	2 December 1929 – May 1930	Died in office
	George Maxwell (1859–1935)	Independent	May 1930 – 7 May 1931	Died in office
	George Maxwell (1859–1935)	United Australia	7 May 1931 – 25 June 1935	Died in office
	Harold Holt (1908–1967)	United Australia	17 August 1935 – 21 February 1945	Served as minister under Menzies and Fadden. Transferred to the Division of Higgins
	Harold Holt (1908–1967)	Liberal	21 February 1945– 10 December 1949	Served as minister under Menzies and Fadden. Transferred to the Division of Higgins
	Bill Bourke (1913–1981)	Labor	10 December 1949 – April 1955	Lost seat
	Bill Bourke (1913–1981)	Labor (Anti-Communist)	April 1955 – 10 December 1955	Lost seat
	Peter Howson (1919–2009)	Liberal	10 December 1955 – 25 October 1969	Served as Chief Government Whip in the House under Menzies. Served as minister under Menzies, Holt, McEwen and Gorton. Transferred to the Division of Casey after Fawkner was abolished in 1969
