= Electoral results for the Division of Hoddle =

Australian division election results

This is a list of electoral results for the Division of Hoddle in Australian federal elections from the division's creation in 1949 until its abolition in 1955.

== Members ==
Member	Party	Term
Jack Cremean	Labor	1949–1955
Jack Cremean	Labor (A-C)	1955–1955

== Election results ==
=== Elections in the 1950s ===
==== 1954 ====
1954 Australian federal election: Hoddle
Party	Candidate	Votes	%	±%
Labor	Jack Cremean	23,439	75.8	−2.9
Liberal	Desmond Byrne	6,302	20.4	+2.8
Communist	John Prescott	1,198	3.9	+0.2
Total formal votes		30,939	97.6	
Informal votes		767	2.4	
Turnout		31,706	94.3	
Two-party-preferred result
Labor	Jack Cremean		79.4	−2.7
Liberal	Desmond Byrne		20.6	+2.7
Labor hold		Swing	−2.7	

==== 1951 ====
1951 Australian federal election: Hoddle
Party	Candidate	Votes	%	±%
Labor	Jack Cremean	27,685	78.7	+1.6
Liberal	Jack Easton	6,193	17.6	−0.3
Communist	Leslie Loye	1,310	3.7	+0.6
Total formal votes		35,188	96.5	
Informal votes		1,276	3.5	
Turnout		36,464	94.4	
Two-party-preferred result
Labor	Jack Cremean		82.1	+1.3
Liberal	Jack Easton		17.9	−1.3
Labor hold		Swing	+1.3	

=== Elections in the 1940s ===
==== 1949 ====
1949 Australian federal election: Hoddle
Party	Candidate	Votes	%	±%
Labor	Jack Cremean	28,351	77.1	+1.3
Liberal	Terence Kirby	6,593	17.9	−3.3
Communist	Leslie Loye	1,137	3.1	+0.0
Independent	Albert Wallace	689	1.9	+1.9
Total formal votes		36,770	96.4	
Informal votes		1,382	3.6	
Turnout		38,152	94.4	
Two-party-preferred result
Labor	Jack Cremean		80.8	−2.3
Liberal	Terence Kirby		19.2	+2.3
Labor notional hold		Swing	−2.3	
