= Electoral results for the Division of Scullin (1955–1969) =

Australian division election results

This is a list of electoral results for the Division of Scullin (1955–69) in Australian federal elections from the division's creation in 1955 until its abolition in 1969.

== Members ==
Member	Party	Term
Ted Peters	Labor	1955–1969

== Election results ==
=== Elections in the 1960s ===
==== 1966 ====
1966 Australian federal election: Scullin
Party	Candidate	Votes	%	±%
Labor	Ted Peters	14,271	53.3	−5.2
Liberal	Ronald Hay	7,267	27.1	+5.7
Democratic Labor	Peter McCabe	2,072	11.5	−6.6
Independent	John Daley	2,164	8.1	+8.1
Total formal votes		26,774	92.2	
Informal votes		2,271	7.8	
Turnout		29,045	92.7	
Two-party-preferred result
Labor	Ted Peters		58.0	−3.9
Liberal	Ronald Hay		42.0	+3.9
Labor hold		Swing	−3.9	

==== 1963 ====
1963 Australian federal election: Scullin
Party	Candidate	Votes	%	±%
Labor	Ted Peters	16,764	58.5	−2.4
Liberal	John Harrison	6,131	21.4	+6.3
Democratic Labor	James Abikhair	5,194	18.1	−5.8
Communist	Ron Hearn	554	1.9	+1.9
Total formal votes		28,643	94.9	
Informal votes		1,535	5.1	
Turnout		30,178	94.4	
Two-party-preferred result
Labor	Ted Peters		61.9	−0.5
Liberal	John Harrison		32.1	+32.1
Labor hold		Swing	−0.5	

==== 1961 ====
1961 Australian federal election: Scullin
Party	Candidate	Votes	%	±%
Labor	Ted Peters	18,506	60.9	+4.9
Democratic Labor	Barry O'Brien	7,273	23.9	−0.6
Liberal	Rex Schurmann	4,594	15.1	−4.4
Total formal votes		30,373	94.8	
Informal votes		1,664	5.2	
Turnout		32,037	92.6	
Two-party-preferred result
Labor	Ted Peters		62.4	+4.4
Democratic Labor	Barry O'Brien		37.6	−4.4
Labor hold		Swing	+4.4	

=== Elections in the 1950s ===
==== 1958 ====
1958 Australian federal election: Scullin
Party	Candidate	Votes	%	±%
Labor	Ted Peters	18,619	56.0	+6.3
Democratic Labor	Thomas Brennan	8,160	24.5	−6.1
Liberal	Bill Burns	6,488	19.5	−0.1
Total formal votes		33,267	95.4	
Informal votes		1,593	4.6	
Turnout		34,860	94.2	
Two-party-preferred result
Labor	Ted Peters		58.0	+6.3
Democratic Labor	Thomas Brennan		42.0	−6.3
Labor hold		Swing	+6.3	

==== 1955 ====
1955 Australian federal election: Scullin
Party	Candidate	Votes	%	±%
Labor	Ted Peters	18,896	49.7	−23.4
Labor (A-C)	Jack Cremean	11,643	30.6	+30.6
Liberal	Phillip Lynch	7,450	19.6	−3.3
Total formal votes		37,989	94.9	
Informal votes		2,061	5.1	
Turnout		40,050	92.1	
Two-party-preferred result
Labor	Ted Peters	19,655	51.7	−24.9
Labor (A-C)	Jack Cremean	18,334	48.3	+48.3
Labor notional hold		Swing	−24.9	
