= Electoral results for the Division of Burke (1949–1955) =

Australian division election results

This is a list of electoral results for the Division of Burke in Australian federal elections from the division's creation in 1949 until its abolition in 1955.

== Members ==
Member	Party	Term
Ted Peters	Labor	1949–1955

== Election results ==
=== Elections in the 1950s ===
==== 1954 ====
1954 Australian federal election: Burke
Party	Candidate	Votes	%	±%
Labor	Ted Peters	23,510	68.7	−3.7
Liberal	Alfred Wall	9,260	27.0	−0.6
Communist	Vida Little	1,467	4.3	+4.3
Total formal votes		34,237	98.2	
Informal votes		613	1.8	
Turnout		34,850	96.0	
Two-party-preferred result
Labor	Ted Peters		72.6	+0.2
Liberal	Alfred Wall		27.4	−0.2
Labor hold		Swing	+0.2	

==== 1951 ====
1951 Australian federal election: Burke
Party	Candidate	Votes	%	±%
Labor	Ted Peters	27,422	72.4	+10.3
Liberal	Alfred Wall	10,446	27.6	+2.4
Total formal votes		37,868	97.8	
Informal votes		861	2.2	
Turnout		38,729	96.1	
Labor hold		Swing	+3.0	

=== Elections in the 1940s ===
==== 1949 ====
1949 Australian federal election: Burke
Party	Candidate	Votes	%	±%
Labor	Ted Peters	24,362	62.1	+11.1
Liberal	Alfred Wall	9,865	25.2	+2.4
Blackburn-Mutton Labor	Henry Hodges	4,720	12.0	+12.0
Independent	James Whitworth	271	0.7	+0.7
Total formal votes		39,218	97.5	
Informal votes		999	2.5	
Turnout		40,217	95.8	
Two-party-preferred result
Labor	Ted Peters		69.4	−0.7
Liberal	Alfred Wall		30.6	+0.7
Labor notional hold		Swing	−0.7	
