= Members of the Australian House of Representatives =

Following are lists of members of the Australian House of Representatives:

- Members of the Australian House of Representatives, 1901–1903
- Members of the Australian House of Representatives, 1903–1906
- Members of the Australian House of Representatives, 1906–1910
- Members of the Australian House of Representatives, 1910–1913
- Members of the Australian House of Representatives, 1913–1914
- Members of the Australian House of Representatives, 1914–1917
- Members of the Australian House of Representatives, 1917–1919
- Members of the Australian House of Representatives, 1919–1922
- Members of the Australian House of Representatives, 1922–1925
- Members of the Australian House of Representatives, 1925–1928
- Members of the Australian House of Representatives, 1928–1929
- Members of the Australian House of Representatives, 1929–1931
- Members of the Australian House of Representatives, 1931–1934
- Members of the Australian House of Representatives, 1934–1937
- Members of the Australian House of Representatives, 1937–1940
- Members of the Australian House of Representatives, 1940–1943
- Members of the Australian House of Representatives, 1943–1946
- Members of the Australian House of Representatives, 1946–1949
- Members of the Australian House of Representatives, 1949–1951
- Members of the Australian House of Representatives, 1951–1954
- Members of the Australian House of Representatives, 1954–1955
- Members of the Australian House of Representatives, 1955–1958
- Members of the Australian House of Representatives, 1958–1961
- Members of the Australian House of Representatives, 1961–1963
- Members of the Australian House of Representatives, 1963–1966
- Members of the Australian House of Representatives, 1966–1969
- Members of the Australian House of Representatives, 1969–1972
- Members of the Australian House of Representatives, 1972–1974
- Members of the Australian House of Representatives, 1974–1975
- Members of the Australian House of Representatives, 1975–1977
- Members of the Australian House of Representatives, 1977–1980
- Members of the Australian House of Representatives, 1980–1983
- Members of the Australian House of Representatives, 1983–1984
- Members of the Australian House of Representatives, 1984–1987
- Members of the Australian House of Representatives, 1987–1990
- Members of the Australian House of Representatives, 1990–1993
- Members of the Australian House of Representatives, 1993–1996
- Members of the Australian House of Representatives, 1996–1998
- Members of the Australian House of Representatives, 1998–2001
- Members of the Australian House of Representatives, 2001–2004
- Members of the Australian House of Representatives, 2004–2007
- Members of the Australian House of Representatives, 2007–2010
- Members of the Australian House of Representatives, 2010–2013
- Members of the Australian House of Representatives, 2013–2016
- Members of the Australian House of Representatives, 2016–2019
- Members of the Australian House of Representatives, 2019–2022
- Members of the Australian House of Representatives, 2022–2025
- Members of the Australian House of Representatives, 2025–2028

== See also ==
- List of Australian federal by-elections
