= History of the Australian Labor Party =

The history of the Australian Labor Party (federally spelt Labour prior to 1912) has its origins in the Labour parties founded in the 1890s in the Australian colonies prior to federation. Labor tradition ascribes the founding of Queensland Labour to a meeting of striking pastoral workers under a ghost gum tree (the "Tree of Knowledge") in Barcaldine, Queensland in 1891. The Balmain, New South Wales branch of the party claims to be the oldest in Australia. Labour as a parliamentary party dates from 1891 in New South Wales and South Australia, 1893 in Queensland, and later in the other colonies.

The first general election contested by Labour candidates was the 1891 New South Wales election, where Labour candidates (then called the Labor Electoral League of New South Wales) won 35 of 141 seats. The major parties were the Protectionist and Free Trade parties and Labour held the balance of power. It offered parliamentary support in exchange for policy enactment. Also in 1891, three United Labor Party (ULP) of South Australia candidates were elected to the South Australian Legislative Council. At the 1893 South Australian election the United Labor Party led by John McPherson won 10 of the 54 seats and the balance of power in the House of Assembly, allowing the liberal government of Charles Kingston to be formed, ousting the conservative government of John Downer. By the 1905 South Australian election Thomas Price became the first Labor Premier of South Australia. Re-elected at the 1906 double dissolution election serving until his death in 1909, it was the world's first stable Labour Party government. So successful, John Verran led Labor to form the state's first of many majority governments at the 1910 South Australian election. In 1899, Anderson Dawson formed a Labour minority government in Queensland, the first Labour Party government in the world, which lasted one week while the conservatives regrouped after a split.

The colonial Labour parties and the trade unions were mixed in their support for the Federation of Australia. Some Labour representatives argued against the proposed constitution, claiming the Senate as proposed was too powerful, similar to the anti-reformist colonial upper houses and the British House of Lords. They feared federation would further entrench the power of the conservative forces. The first Labour leader following the inaugural 1901 federal election and later prime minister, Chris Watson, however, was a supporter of federation.

Following the 1903 federal election, the four-month 1904 Chris Watson minority government was the world's first Labour Party government at a national level. Then led by Andrew Fisher, Labour success at the 1910 federal election represented a number of firsts: it was Australia's first elected federal majority government; Australia's first elected Senate majority; the world's first Labour Party majority government at a national level.

By 1910, Labor members of both state and federal parliaments had successfully won concessions from other parties and influence various social reforms, such as those concerning industrial arbitration, working hours, wages boards, and old age pensions. In the state of Victoria, for instance, a minimum wage was included in legislation from 1896 that set up wages boards following a Labor amendment. According to historian Ross McMullin, “Compared to other countries Australia was relatively advanced in living standards and social reform, and Labor could take much of the credit. While Deakin and other non-Labor figures were instrumental in some progressive innovations in this era of social optimism, the man driving force was the Labour Party.”

At the dawn of the Twentieth Century, European observers wrote admiringly of the progress that Australia as well as New Zealand had made in terms of improving the living standards of ordinary people. One such observer, Käthe Lux, told readers of a German periodical about how working hours in Australia were not only relatively low but that earnings were relatively high, and expressed that she was ‘very impressed with the extraordinary degree of political success of the Australian Labor parties.’ In addition, moderate members of Europe’s leading socialist party, the Social Democratic Party of Germany, expressed hopes that the accomplishments of Australian Labor ‘will spur our German comrades to match…the Australian achievements.’ Another observer, Albert Métin (who spent six months in Australasia) argued that living and working conditions in both Australia and New Zealand were better than those in Britain, adding that out of various countries he observed state power in Australasia ‘ha been used most extensively to regulate social and economic affairs.’

As Ross McMullin has argued:

In its first decade Australian Labor had been instrumental in creating an exciting social laboratory, which was leading the world in progressive legislation benefiting the working class and attracting visitors from across the globe at a time when the infant British Labour Party had made no impression whatever.

== Overview ==
The Labor Party is commonly described as a social democratic party and its constitution stipulates that it is a democratic socialist party. The party was created by, and has always been influenced by, the trade unions, and in practice Labor politicians regard themselves as part of the broader labour movement and tradition. At the first federal election in 1901 Labor's platform called for a White Australia Policy, a citizen army and compulsory arbitration of industrial disputes. Labor has historically been a pragmatic party, and has at various times supported high tariffs and low tariffs, conscription and pacifism, White Australia and multiculturalism, nationalisation and privatisation, isolationism and internationalism.

Historically, Labor and its affiliated unions were strong opponents of non-British immigration, expressed as the White Australia policy which barred all non-European migration to Australia. Besides the 19th century pseudo-scientific theories about "racial purity", the main labour concern was the fear of economic competition from immigrants prepared to accept low-wage, views which were shared by the vast majority of Australians and all major political parties. In practice the labour movement opposed all migration, on the grounds that immigrants competed with Australian workers and drove down wages. This objection continued until after World War II, when the Chifley government launched a major immigration program. The party's opposition to non-European immigration did not change until after the retirement of Arthur Calwell as leader in 1967. Subsequently, Labor has become an advocate of multiculturalism, although some of its trade union base and some of its members continued to oppose high immigration levels.

One of the first members of the NSW Labor caucus described themselves as "a band of unhappy amateurs", made up of blue collar workers, a squatter, a doctor, and even a mine owner, indicating that Labor was formed of more than just unions. In addition, many members from the working class supported the liberal notion of free trade between the colonies – in the first grouping of state MPs, 17 of the 35 were free-traders.

At the 1921 All-Australian Trades Union Congress a resolution was passed calling for "the socialisation of industry, production, distribution and exchange." As a result, Labor's Federal Conference in 1922 adopted a similarly worded "socialist objective," which remained official policy for many years. The resolution was immediately qualified, however, by the "Blackburn amendment," which said that "socialisation" was desirable only when was necessary to "eliminate exploitation and other anti-social features."

== The Labour years ==
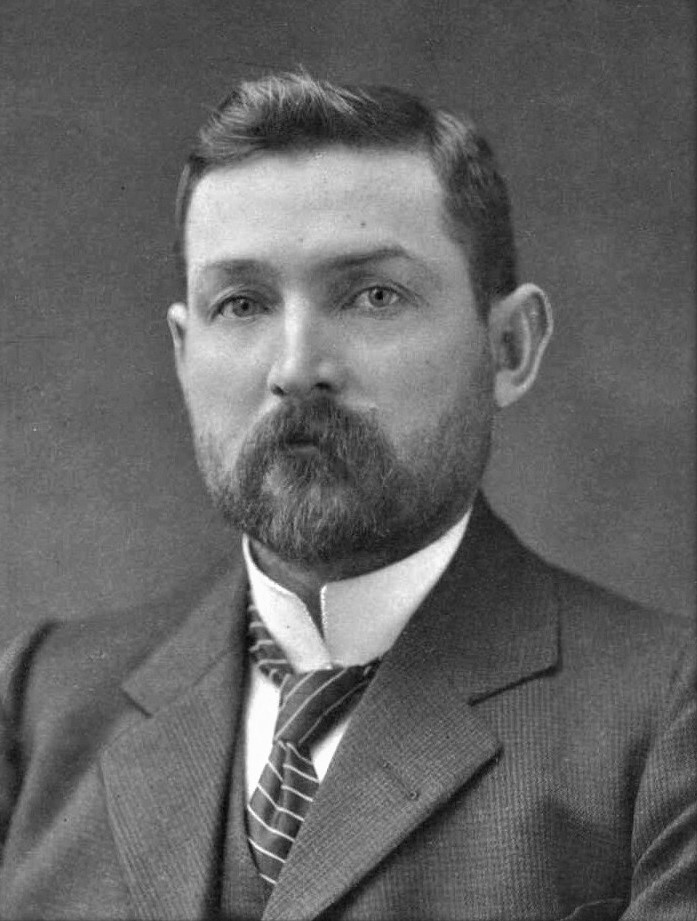
Chris Watson, first leader of then Federal Labour Party 1901–07 (held the balance of power) and Prime Minister in 1904

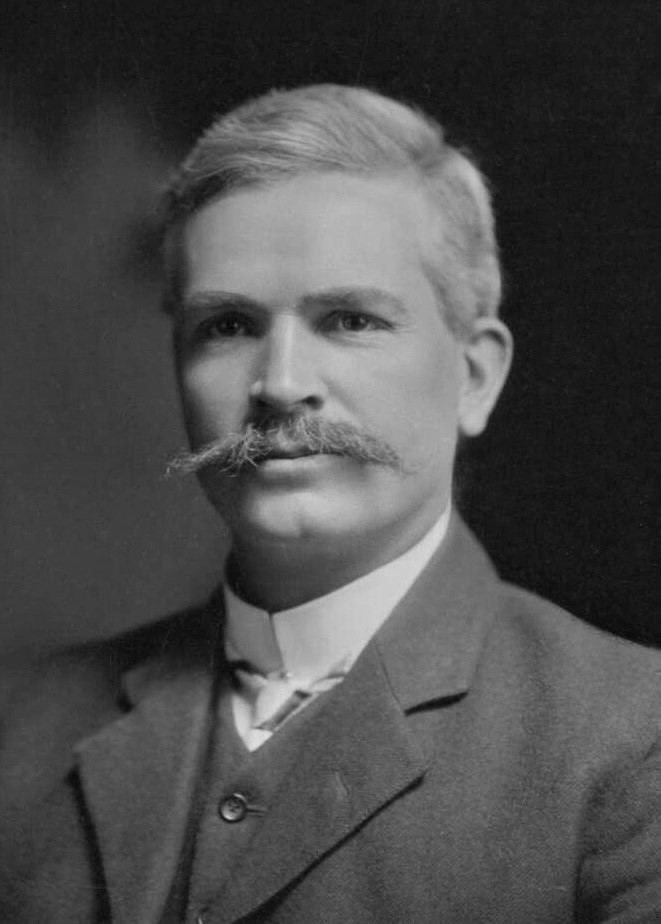
Andrew Fisher, Prime Minister 1908–09, 1910–13, 1914–15

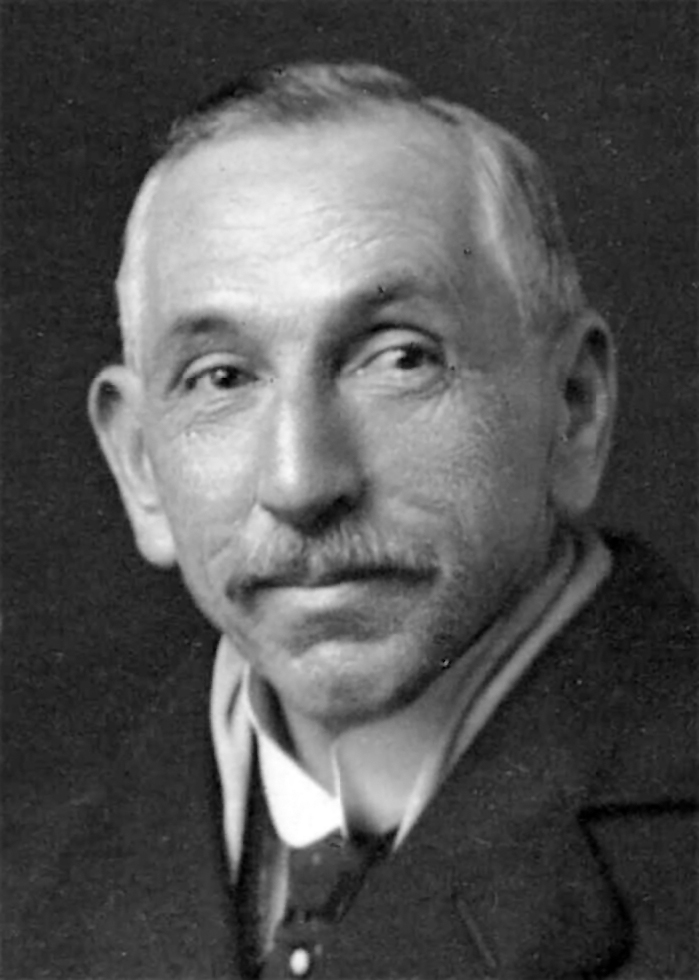
Billy Hughes, Prime Minister 1915–16

Celia Hamilton, examining New South Wales, argues for the central role of Irish Catholics. Before 1890, they opposed Henry Parkes, the main Liberal leader, and free trade, seeing them as representative of Protestant Englishmen who represented landholding and large business interests. In the strike of 1890 the leading Catholic Sydney's Archbishop Patrick Francis Moran was sympathetic toward unions, but Catholic newspapers were negative. After 1900, says Hamilton, Irish Catholics were drawn to the Labour Party because its stress on equality and social welfare fitted with their status as manual laborers and small farmers. In the 1910 elections Labour gained in the more Catholic areas and the representation of Catholics increased in Labour's parliamentary ranks.

At Federation, the Labour Party did not have any national organisation. It was some years before the party would have any significant structure or organisation at the federal level. The first election to the federal Parliament in 1901 was contested by state Labour parties in five of the six states – in Tasmania, where there was no Labour party, King O'Malley was elected as an independent labour candidate. In total, they won 15% of the vote and 15 of the 75 seats in the House of Representatives and eight Senate places, and two Independents joined the party. The 25 Labour members met as the federal parliamentary Labour Party (informally known as the Caucus, comprising members of the House of Representatives and the Senate) on 8 May 1901 at Parliament House, Melbourne, the meeting place of the first federal Parliament. Caucus elected Chris Watson leader, decided to call the party Federal Labour Party and to support the Protectionist Party minority government against the Free Trade Party. Federal Labour under Watson increased its numbers to 23 in the House and 8 in the Senate at the 1903 federal election and continued to hold the balance of power and support the Protectionist Party. In April 1904, however, Watson and Deakin fell out over the issue of extending the scope of industrial relations laws concerning the Conciliation and Arbitration Bill to cover state public servants, the fallout causing Deakin to resign. Free Trade leader George Reid declined to take office, which saw Watson become the first Labour Prime Minister, and the world's first Labour head of government at a national level (Anderson Dawson had led a short-lived Labour government in Queensland in December 1899), though his was a minority government that lasted only four months. He was aged only 37, and is still the youngest prime minister in Australia's history. After Watson's government fell, Deakin became prime minister again for a short period, to be followed by the Free Trade Party's Reid, who had Labour's Conciliation and Arbitration Act 1904, which was the cause of the political upheaval, passed.

George Reid of the Free Trade Party adopted a strategy of trying to reorient the party system along Labour vs non-Labour lines – prior to the 1906 federal election, he renamed his Free Trade Party to the Anti-Socialist Party. Reid envisaged a spectrum running from socialist to anti-socialist, with the Protectionist Party in the middle. This attempt struck a chord with politicians who were steeped in the Westminster tradition and regarded a two-party system as very much the norm.

At the election of 1906, which now permitted postal voting, Watson increased Labour House seats to 26. Though they had more seats than the Protectionist Party with 16, Labour supported Deakin as prime minister. Watson resigned as leader in 1907 and was succeeded by Andrew Fisher. Fisher withdrew its support of the Deakin government on 13 November 1908 and formed a minority government. The Fisher government passed a large number of its legislation. A scandalised establishment, believing an anti-socialist alliance was necessary to counter Labor's growing electoral dominance, pressured Deakin and Anti-Socialist Party's new leader, Joseph Cook, to begin merger talks. The main body of Protectionists, including Deakin and his supporters merged with the Anti-Socialist Party in May 1909 to become the Commonwealth Liberal Party, popularly known as "the Fusion", with Deakin as leader and Cook as deputy leader. The more liberal Protectionists defected to Labour. Deakin now held a majority in the House of Representatives and the Fisher government fell in a vote on 27 May 1909. Fisher failed to persuade the Governor-General Lord Dudley to dissolve Parliament and Deakin formed Australia's first majority government in June 1909, under the CLP banner, which governed less than a year until the 1910 federal election, held in April of that year.

At the 1910 election, Fisher led Labour to victory with 50% of the vote and 42 seats. The Fisher government was Australia's first elected federal majority government, held Australia's first Senate majority (22 out of 36), and was the world's first labour party majority government. This was the first time a labour party had controlled any house of a legislature, and the first time it controlled both houses of a bicameral legislature. Labour implemented many of its policies mostly in his first government in fields such as defence, constitutional matters, finance, transport and communications, and social security, including establishing old-age and disability pensions, improved working conditions including a maternity allowance and workers compensation, created a national currency, forming the Royal Australian Navy, the commencement of construction for the Trans-Australian Railway, expanding the bench of the High Court of Australia, founding Canberra and establishing the government-owned Commonwealth Bank. Fisher carried out measures to break up land monopolies, put forward proposals for more regulation of working hours, wages and employment conditions, and amended the 1904 Conciliation and Arbitration Act to provide greater authority for the court president and to allow for Commonwealth employees' industrial unions, registered with the Arbitration Court. A land tax, aimed at breaking up big estates and to provide a wider scope for small-scale farming, was also introduced, while coverage of the Arbitration system extended to agricultural workers, domestics, and federal public servants. In addition, the age at which women became entitled to the old-age pension was lowered from 65 to 60. The introduction of the maternity allowance enabled more births to be attended by doctors, thus leading to reductions in infant mortality. Fisher also for the first time appointed a High Commissioner to Britain.

The state branches were also successful, except in Victoria, where the strength of Deakinite liberalism inhibited the party's growth. The state branches formed their first majority governments in New South Wales and South Australia in 1910, in Western Australia in 1911, in Queensland in 1915 and in Tasmania in 1925. Such success eluded equivalent social democratic and labour parties in other countries for many years. Labor also submitted two referendum questions in 1911, both of which were lost. The party adopted the formal name "Australian Labour Party" in 1908, but changed the spelling of "Labour" in its name to "Labor" in 1912.

== World War I conscription and the split of 1916 ==
At the 1913 federal election Fisher lost by one seat to the Commonwealth Liberal Party, led by Joseph Cook, who had left the Labor party in 1894, but Labor retained a Senate majority. Labor had submitted six referendum questions in conjunction with the 1913 election, all of which were lost. Following the 1913 election, Labor formed the Opposition, the first time that the party held that status, previously being either in government or supporting the government party. A double dissolution was called in 1914 over a proposal to abolish preferential employment for trade union members in the public service. However, after the election of 1914 had been called, the British declaration of war made the election a side issue. The incumbent caretaker government and the country went on a war footing, with mobilisation and other measures. Both parties declared complete commitment to the war effort. Despite the historic advantage that an incumbent government has at the start of war, Labor under Fisher gained a majority in both Houses, with the majority in the Senate being overwhelming. In 1915 Fisher retired as prime minister and leader of the party and was succeeded by Billy Hughes.

Hughes supported the introduction of conscription in Australia during World War I, while the majority of his Labor colleagues and the trade union movement opposed it. After failing to gain majority support for conscription in the 1916 plebiscite, which bitterly divided the country and the Labor Party Hughes and 24 of his followers—including most of the cabinet—left the Caucus and were then expelled from the Labor Party.

Frank Tudor became Labor leader while Hughes and his followers formed the National Labor Party. Hughes continued in office at the helm of a minority government with the parliamentary support of the Commonwealth Liberal Party, led by Cook. The two parties then merged to form the Nationalist Party of Australia to fight the 1917 election, which they won decisively on a massive swing, which was magnified by the large number of Labor MPs who followed Hughes out of the party. As a result, Hughes became and remains a traitor in Labor histories.

Hughes then held the 1917 plebiscite on the same conscription issue, which was even more soundly defeated. The rural-based Country Party became a political factor from the 1910s. The party represented small farmers, but had the effect of splitting the anti-Labor vote in conservative country areas, and allowing Labor candidates to win with a minority vote. In response, the conservative Hughes government changed the voting system from first-past-the-post to preferential voting, which allowed the anti-Labor parties to stand candidates against each other without putting seats at risk by exchanging preferences with each other. At the 1919 election Hughes lost his majority, but was kept in government by the Country Party. Hughes also submitted two referendum questions in conjunction with the 1919 election, both of which were lost.

At the state level William Holman, also a supporter of conscription, quit the party at the same time and became Nationalist Premier of New South Wales.

== 1920s ==
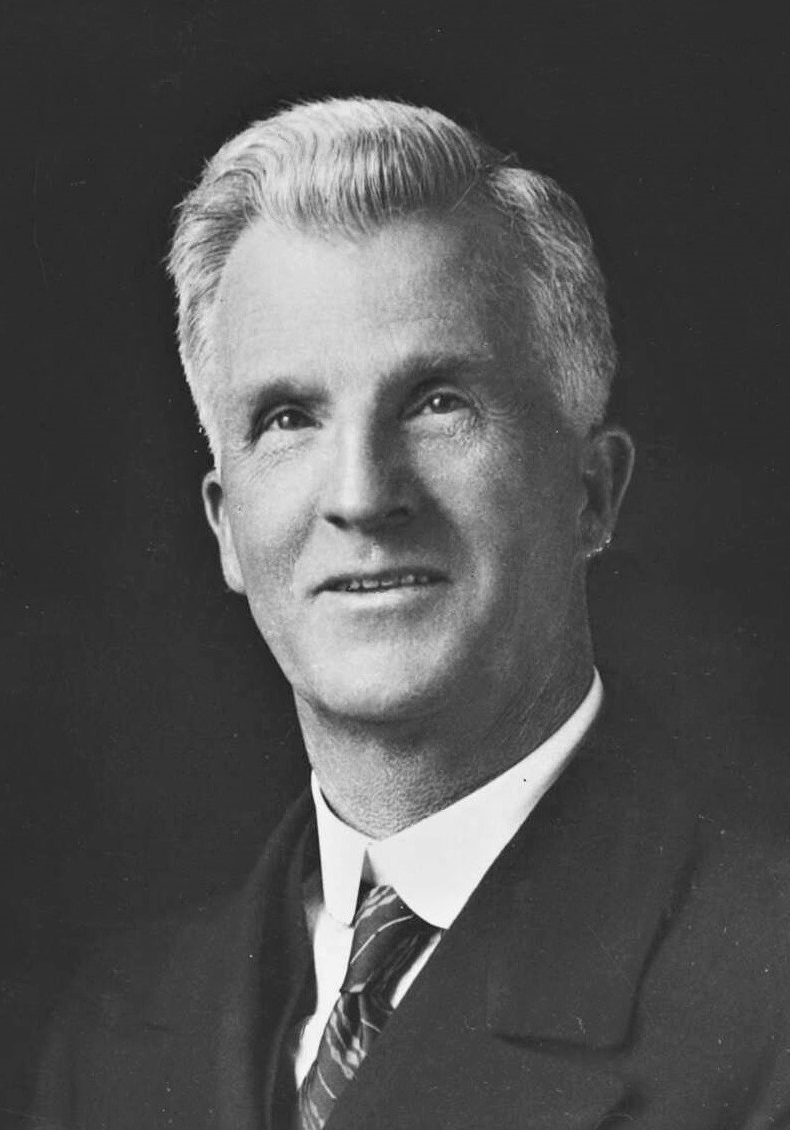
James Scullin, Prime Minister 1929–32

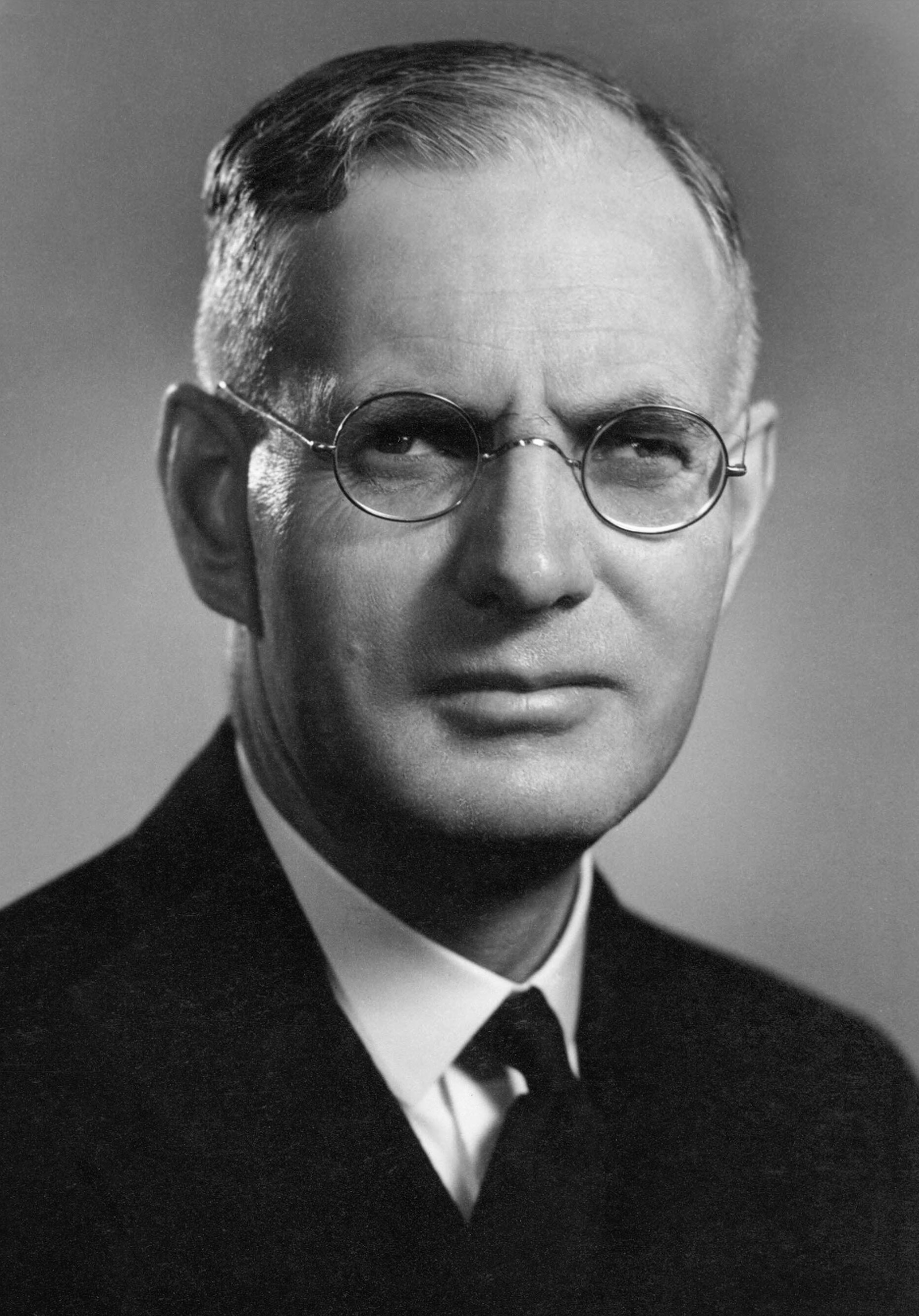
John Curtin, Prime Minister 1941–45

Tudor died in 1922 and Matthew Charlton succeeded as Labor leader. At the 1922 election, Labor won the most seats, but not a majority. Hughes could only realistically stay in office with the support of the Country Party. However, Country leader Earle Page would not even consider negotiating with the Nationalists unless Hughes resigned. Hughes resigned as Nationalist leader and was replaced by Stanley Bruce in 1923. Bruce and Page quickly came to a coalition agreement that allowed Bruce to become prime minister.

Besides Hughes' departure, the Country Party insisted on the introduction of compulsory voting for federal elections, which was introduced in 1924. Another change was a further misapportionment this time in favour of rural constituencies. At the 1925 election Labor led by Charlton again lost to the Coalition. (Labor received 45% of the vote and won 23 seats, to the Coalition's 51.) Labor, this time led by James Scullin, who replaced Charlton earlier that year, also lost the 1928 election, but won resoundingly the 1929 House election to form a majority government but remained in minority in the Senate. In 1930, Scullin broke tradition by insisting that the Monarch act on the advice of the Australian prime minister in the appointment of the Governor-General, and insisted on the appointment of Isaac Isaacs, the first Australian-born appointment to the office. The appointment was denounced by the opposition Nationalist Party as being "practically republican", though it became the norm throughout the Commonwealth.

== Great Depression and the split of 1931 ==
In 1931, the predominant issues revolving around how best to handle the Great Depression in Australia and resulted in a Labor split. The ALP was essentially split three ways, between believers in orthodox finance such as Prime Minister Scullin and a senior minister in his government, Joseph Lyons; proto-Keynesians such as federal Treasurer Ted Theodore; and those who believed in radical policies such as New South Wales Premier Jack Lang, who wanted to repudiate Australia's debt to British bondholders. In 1931, Lyons and his supporters left the Labor party and joined the Nationalist Party to form the United Australia Party under his leadership. At the 1931 election Labor was soundly defeated by the United Australia Party led by Lyons, who fought the election in Coalition with the Country Party, but won enough seats to form government on its own. The result was repeated at the 1934 election except that Lyons had to form government with the Country Party. The poor Labor result was attributed to the Lang Labor split of 1931. At the 1937 election Labor led by John Curtin was again defeated by the Coalition. At the 1940 election the Coalition of the United Australia Party led by Robert Menzies since 1939 and the Country Party led by Archie Cameron was able to form a minority government with the parliamentary support of two Independents. In October 1941 the two Independents switched their support to Labor, bringing Curtin to power.

== World War II to early 1950s ==
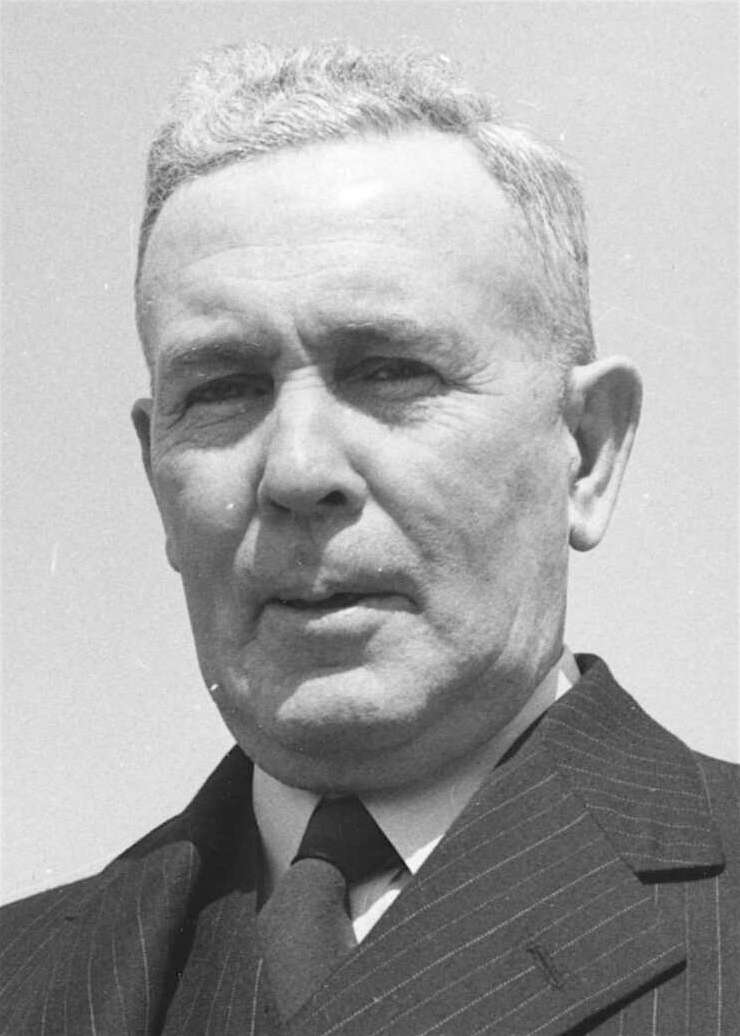
Ben Chifley, Prime Minister 1945–49

The Curtin and Chifley governments governed Australia through the latter half of World War II and initial stages of the transition to peace. Labor leader John Curtin became prime minister in October 1941, before the outbreak of the War in the Pacific, when two independents in the House of Representatives changed their support in the hung Parliament to Labor. Child endowment payments were introduced in 1941, and widow's pensions in 1942. At the start of that Pacific campaign in December 1941, Curtin declared that "Australia looks to America, free of any pangs as to our traditional links or kinship with the United Kingdom", thus helping to establish the Australian-American alliance (later formalised as ANZUS by the Menzies government). Remembered as a strong war time leader and for a landslide win at the 1943 election, receiving 58.2% of the two-party preferred vote and a Senate majority. Commonwealth unemployment benefits were introduced in 1945. Curtin died in office just prior to the end of the war and was succeeded by Ben Chifley.

Chifley Labor won the 1946 election winning 54.1% of the two-party preferred vote against the Coalition of the newly formed Liberal Party of Australia and the Country Party. Chifley oversaw Australia's initial transition to a peacetime economy. Early in this term Chifley was successful in obtaining voter approval for the 1946 Social Services referendum. Chifley's initiatives included the expansion of health care in Australia with a Pharmaceutical Benefits Scheme (PBS) and free hospital ward treatment, the introduction of Australian citizenship (1948), a post-war immigration scheme, the founding of the Australian Security Intelligence Organisation (ASIO), the reorganisation and enlargement of the Australian scientific organisation CSIR to the CSIRO, the Snowy Mountains Scheme, improvements in social services, the establishment of a Universities Commission for the expansion of university education, the creation of the Commonwealth Employment Service (CES), the introduction of federal funds to the States for public housing construction, the creation of a civilian rehabilitation service, over-viewing the foundation of airlines Qantas and Trans Australia Airlines, and the creation of the Australian National University. To a large extent, Chifley saw centralisation of the economy as the means to achieve his ambitions.

After the war, the Communist Party of Australia contested for the leadership of the working class with the Australian Labor Party, and launched an industrial offensive in 1947, culminating in the 1949 Australian coal strike. Chifley saw this as a communist challenge to Labor's position in the labour movement. At the conference of the New South Wales Labor Party in June 1949, Chifley sought to define the labour movement as having:

[A] great objective – the light on the hill – which we aim to reach by working for the betterment of mankind... [Labor would] bring something better to the people, better standards of living, greater happiness to the mass of the people.

— Ben Chifley,

After seven weeks, Chifley used Australian military forces and strikebreakers to break the strike, the first time such a thing had been done by a Labor government. The measure cost Chifley a lot of his credibility among Labor supporters.

In June 1948, the Chifley government adopted the British model for television in Australia, with the establishment of a government-controlled TV station in each capital city and the prohibition on commercial TV licences. This policy was never put into practice, however, because the Labor government did not have the opportunity to establish the TV network before it was defeated at the 1949 election. The incoming Liberal-Country Party coalition led by Robert Menzies changed the industry structure by also permitting the establishment of American-style commercial stations.

The Chifley government made significant changes to the electoral laws prior to the 1949 election: the voting system for the Senate was changed to proportional voting, and there was a large increase in the number of members in each House.

With an increasingly uncertain economic outlook, after his attempt to nationalise the banks and aftermath of the coalminers strike, Chifley lost office at the 1949 election to Robert Menzies' Liberal-National Coalition. Labor still had a majority in the Senate. The Coalition government sought to reverse the proposed nationalisation of the banks enacted by the previous Chifley government, but were frustrated by the Labor Senate majority. The government called a double dissolution and at the 1951 election the Menzies government was returned, Labor lost its Senate majority and the bank de-nationalisation law was passed. Labor has not held a majority in the Senate since.

== The DLP and the split of 1955 ==
During the Korean War, the Menzies government tried to ban the Communist Party of Australia with the Communist Party Dissolution Act 1950 (Cth), which was declared invalid by the High Court in Australian Communist Party v The Commonwealth. Soon after the 1951 election, Chifley died and was succeeded as party leader and Opposition leader by H.V. Evatt. Menzies then submitted the Communist Party issue to the 1951 referendum, which was opposed by the Communist Party as well as the Australian Labor Party. (Evatt had been counsel during the High Court case.) The referendum was narrowly defeated. Communist influence in the unions, and through the unions in the Labor Party, remained a potent and emotive issue for a significant number of ALP members, and the tag "soft-on-communism" was repeatedly used by the Menzies government against the party.

At the 1954 federal election, Labor received over 50% of the popular vote and won 57 seats (up 5) to the coalition's 64. Later that year, Evatt blamed Labor's defeat in the election on "a small minority of members, located particularly in the State of Victoria", which were in conspiracy to undermine him. Evatt blamed B. A. Santamaria and his supporters in the Victorian Labor Party, called "the Groupers". Protestant and left-wing ministers strongly opposed Santamaria's Movement faction. The standoff between the groups led to the Australian Labor Party split of 1955. In early 1955 the Labor Party's Federal executive dissolved the Victorian state executive and appointed a new executive in its place. Both executives sent delegates to the 1955 National Conference in Hobart, where the delegates from the old executive were excluded from the conference. The Victorian branch then split between pro-Evatt and pro-Santamaria factions, and in March the pro-Evatt state executive suspended 24 members of state Parliament suspected of being Santamaria supporters. (Santamaria was not a party member.) Four ministers were forced to resign from John Cain's Victorian Labor government, bringing the Labor government down. At the ensuing May 1955 Victorian state election, the expelled members and others stood as the Australian Labor Party (Anti-Communist). It drew 12.6% of the vote, mainly from the ALP, but because its vote was widely spread only one of its candidates was elected. However, the party's objective was to direct its preferences to the Coalition, and most of its supporters followed the party's preferences. As a result, Labor in Victoria won 37.6% of the primary vote and 42.1% after allocation of preferences; it achieved 20 seats to the Liberals' 34 and the Country Party's ten. The Australian Labor Party (Anti-Communist) went on in 1957 to be the nucleus of the Democratic Labor Party (DLP). At subsequent state and federal elections, the DLP would continue this strategy to keep the ALP out of office. Labor would remain in opposition in Victoria until 1982.

In New South Wales, Labor leader and premier Joseph Cahill decisively won the 1953 NSW election. He was desperate to keep the New South Wales branch united during the split. He achieved this by controlling the anti-DLP faction in his party. The DLP did not contest the 1956 NSW election and Cahill was returned in the 1959 NSW election, but died in office later that year. He was succeeded as leader and premier by Robert Heffron. Heffron continued the Labor reign in New South Wales winning the 1962 NSW election. Heffron resigned the leadership and premiership in 1964, and was succeeded by Jack Renshaw, who lost the premiership at the 1965 NSW election ending 24 years of Labor power in the state.

In Queensland, Labor leader and premier Vince Gair since 1952 was expelled from the Labor party in 1957 because of his support of the Groupers, and went on to form the Queensland Labor Party. As happened earlier in Victoria, the expulsions destroyed the Queensland Labor government; Gair was defeated on a no-confidence motion, and in the resulting election the QLP directed its preferences to the non-Labor parties. Labor would remain in opposition in Queensland until 1989. Gair's QLP was absorbed into the DLP in 1962.

== Whitlam and the Dismissal ==
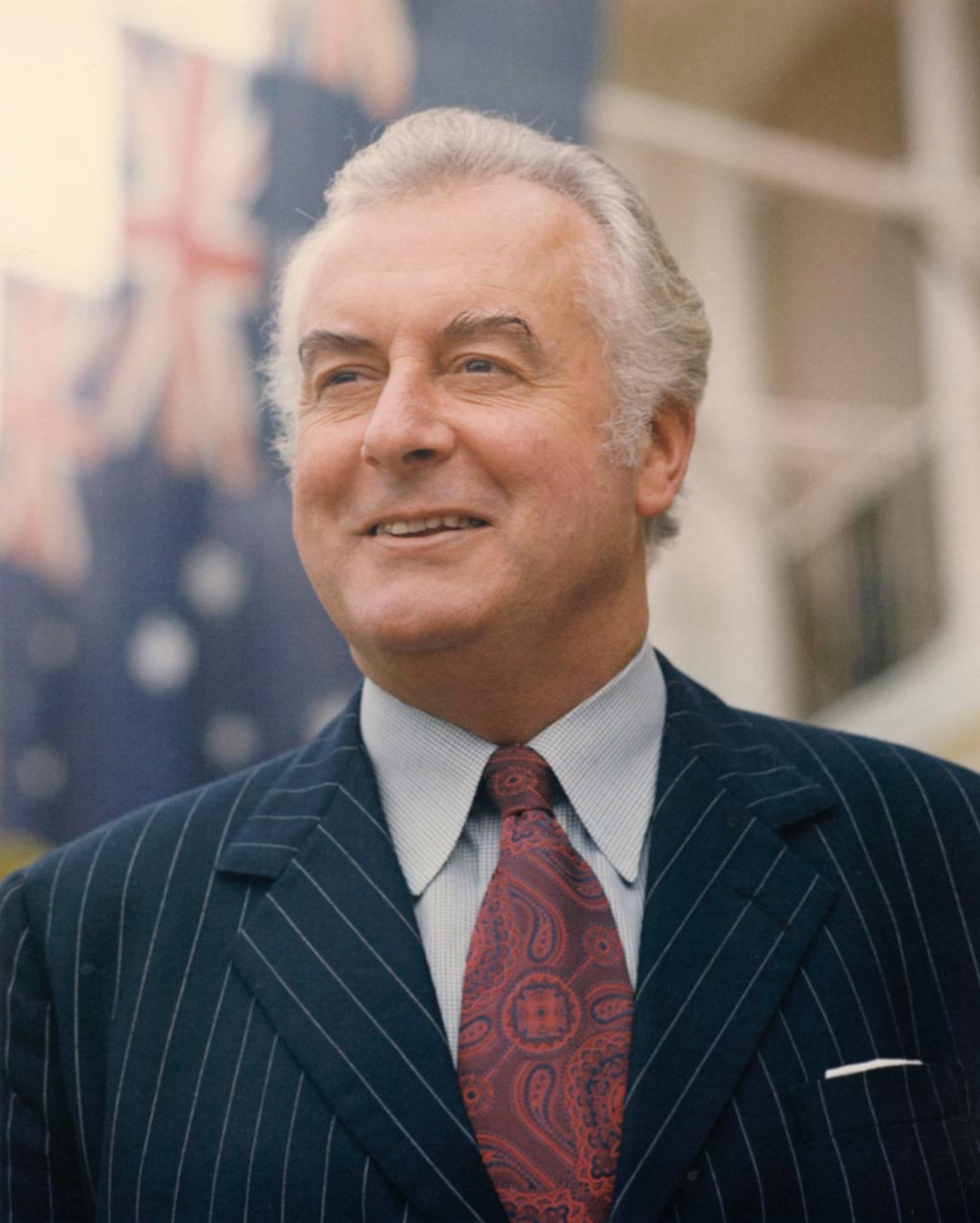
Gough Whitlam, Prime Minister 1972–75

The DLP was effective in keeping Labor out of government at the federal level until 1972, enabling the Coalition to hold on to government in 1961 and 1969 on DLP preferences, though Labor won a majority of the two-party vote. The DLP was also effective in its strategy in Victoria and Queensland. In 1960, Evatt was succeeded as party leader by Arthur Calwell. Calwell was close to toppling Menzies at the 1961 election, but failed because of DLP preferences. He also was unsuccessful at the 1963 and 1966 elections. He resigned leadership in 1967 and was succeeded by Gough Whitlam.

Don Dunstan , together with Gough Whitlam, set about removing the White Australia policy from the Labor platform. The older trade-unionist-based members of the Labor Party vehemently opposed changing the status quo. However, the "New Guard" of the party, of which Dunstan was a part, were determined to bring about its end. Attempts in 1959 and 1961 failed, with Labor leader Arthur Calwell stating, "It would ruin the Party if we altered the immigration policy ... it was only cranks, long hairs, academics and do-gooders who wanted the change." However, Dunstan persisted in his efforts, and in 1965 it was removed from the Labor platform at their national conference; Dunstan personally took credit for the change. Whitlam later brought about the comprehensive end of the White Australia policy in 1973 as Prime Minister of Australia.

Under Whitlam, the ALP factionalised ideological viewpoints, resulting in what is now known as the Socialist Left who tend to favour a more interventionist economic policy and more socially progressive ideals, and Labor Right, the now dominant faction that tends to be more economically liberal and focus to a lesser extent on social issues. Whitlam and the ALP almost won government in the 1969 election, but again missed out because of DLP preferences and the electoral district bias in favour of rural electorates which favoured the Country Party. Whitlam won the 1972 election, bringing the DLP's strategy of keeping the ALP out of power undone. At the election Labor's primary vote was just under 50%, while the DLP's slipped to 5%.

The Whitlam Labor government, marking a break with Labor's socialist tradition, pursued social-democratic policies rather than democratic socialist ones. The Whitlam government passed a large amount of legislation, and saw a massive expansion of the federal budget to implement an extensive number of new programs and policy changes, including fee-free tertiary education, the formal removal of the White Australia Policy, the implementation of legal aid programs, the elimination of military conscription and criminal execution, health care in Australia became universal with the creation of Medibank, and tariffs were cut across the board by 25 percent. In 1974, Whitlam split the DLP by appointing Gair as ambassador to Ireland. Whitlam led federal Labor to another win at the double dissolution 1974 election, which was followed by the only joint sitting of Parliament. (The DLP in 1974 polled only 1% of the vote and lost all its Senate seats. The party formally wound up in 1978.)

The Whitlam government lost office following the 1975 Australian constitutional crisis and dismissal by Governor-General John Kerr after the Coalition blocked supply in the Senate after a series of political scandals, and was defeated at the 1975 election. Whitlam remained leader of the party until the loss at the 1977 election, when he was succeeded by Bill Hayden. Whitlam retired from parliament in 1978. Hayden increased the Labor vote at the 1980 election.

== Hawke-Keating government ==
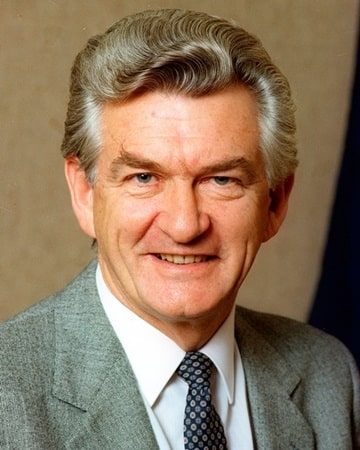
Bob Hawke, Prime Minister 1983–1991

Paul Keating, Prime Minister 1991–1996

Hayden was replaced by former Australian Council of Trade Unions President Bob Hawke in February 1983; weeks later, he led Labor to a landslide victory at the 1983 election. Together with his Treasurer Paul Keating, with whom he formed a powerful political partnership, Hawke led a significant period of economic and social reform which has been hailed by historians and scholars since as laying the groundwork for modern Australia. Hawke and Keating led Labor to victory at five consecutive federal elections: 1983, 1984, 1987, 1990 and 1993. This remains the party's most electorally successful period in its history. Hawke remains Labor's longest-serving prime minister; Keating replaced Hawke in a leadership spill in December 1991. The Hawke-Keating government has been described by Labor figures as the party's most successful period in government in its history, and has generally been reviewed positively by historians for its degree of achievement. Scholars and politicians have noted the importance of the powerful political and personal partnership that developed between Hawke and Keating to the success of the Government.

The Hawke and Keating governments radically transformed the Australian economy, departing from a historical bipartisan Keynesian approach to the Australian economy, with the change of the Australian dollar from a government-fixed exchange rate to a floating exchange rate. Extensive deregulation of financial and banking systems occurred, both of which made Australia significantly more integrated with the global economy. Privatisation of state sector industries occurred, including Qantas and Commonwealth Bank. The tariff system was dismantled, and the subsidisation of some loss-making industries ended. Low-income centralised wage fixing was introduced through the Prices and Incomes Accord, and enterprise bargaining was introduced. The tax system was changed, including the introduction of fringe benefits tax and a capital gains tax. Notably, compulsory superannuation was also implemented, with a 9% employer contribution.

Tertiary education fees in Australia saw a HECS payment system introduced as a replacement for fee-free tertiary education which had been removed after Whitlam. Medicare was introduced as a replacement for Medibank which had also been removed after Whitlam, reintroducing universal health care to Australia. Dental insurance through the Commonwealth Dental Health Program was introduced. Funding for schools was considerably increased, and financial assistance was provided for students to enable them to stay at school longer; at the start of the Government, 3 in 10 students completed high school, but by the end of the Government this had risen to 9 in 10.

On aboriginal affairs, native title in Australia was recognised, and progress was made in directing assistance to the most disadvantaged recipients over a whole range of welfare benefits. The Parliament of Australia itself was reformed in several ways.

Within foreign affairs, the Government's major legacy was the establishment of the Asia-Pacific Economic Cooperation (APEC). The Government also played a key role in numerous international issues, including the ending of apartheid in South Africa, the Gulf War, and establishing the United Nations peace process for Cambodia, culminating in the Transitional Authority Hawke also took a major public stand in the aftermath of the Tiananmen square massacre in 1989; despite having spent years trying to get closer relations with China, Hawke gave a tearful address on national television describing the massacre in graphic detail, and unilaterally offered asylum to over 42,000 Chinese students who were living in Australia at the time, many of whom had publicly supported the Tiananmen protesters.

The duration of the Government saw thousands of Acts passed by the Australian Parliament, despite Labor not having a Senate majority; its legacy remains positively championed by Labor politicians, and is regularly cited by Labor figures as representing the party's most successful period in its entire history.

== Opposition and conflict between Rudd and Gillard ==
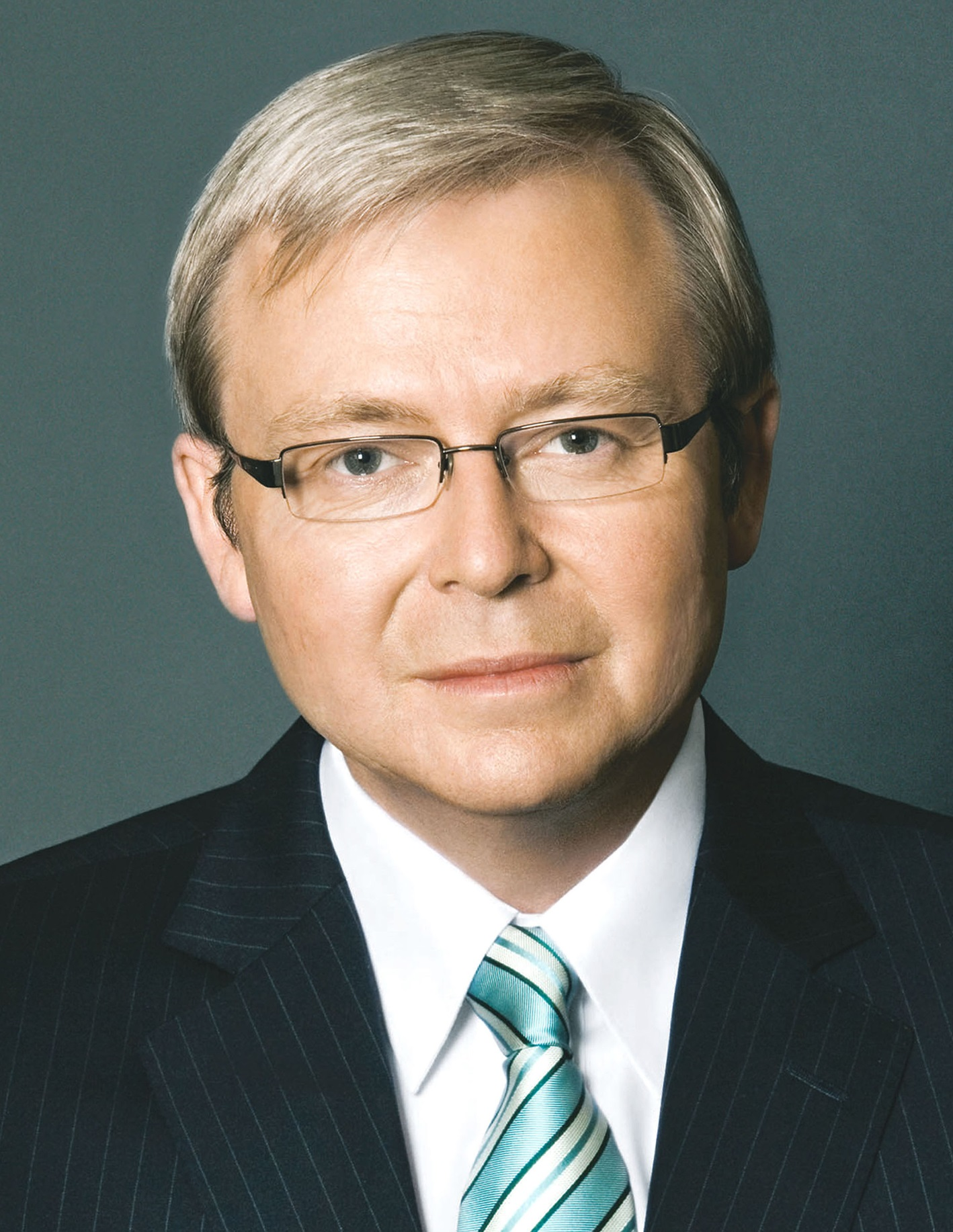
Kevin Rudd, Prime Minister 2007–10, 2013

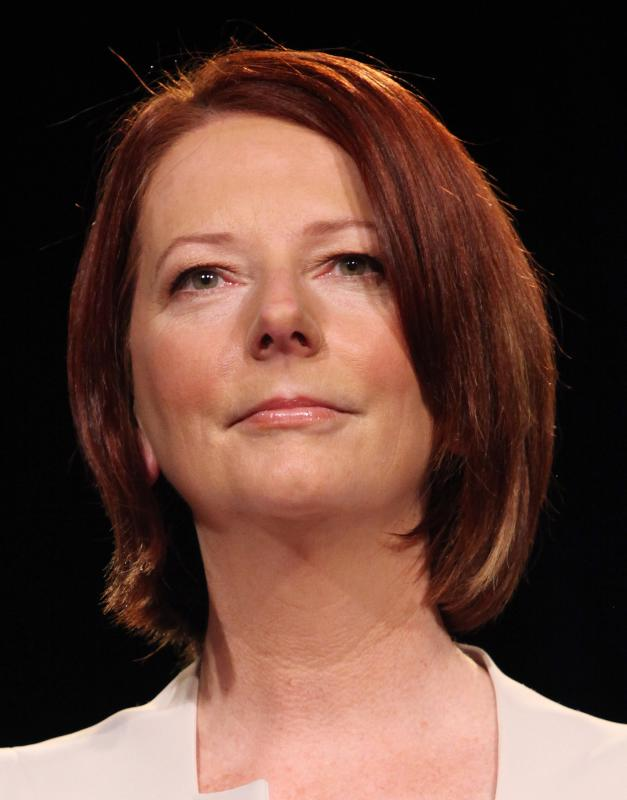
Julia Gillard, Prime Minister 2010–13

The Keating government was defeated by John Howard in the 1996 election and Keating resigned as party leader soon after. He was replaced by Kim Beazley, who led the party to the 1998 election, winning 51% of the two-party preferred vote but falling short on seats, and lost ground at the 2001 election. Mark Latham became leader in December 2003 and led Labor to the 2004 election but lost further ground. Beazley replaced Latham in 2005 and Beazley was in turn challenged by Kevin Rudd who went on to defeat the Howard government at the 2007 election winning 52.7% of the two-party vote. A Senate parliamentary majority required the support of either the Coalition, or all seven crossbenchers − five Greens, Nick Xenophon and Steve Fielding. The Rudd government signed the Kyoto Protocol, and delivered an apology to Indigenous Australians for the stolen generations. The previous Coalition government's WorkChoices industrial relations system was largely dismantled and Fair Work Australia was created. National Broadband Network (NBN) discussions and the final agreement with Telstra occurred and construction and rollout commenced, remaining Iraq War combat personnel were withdrawn, and the "Australia 2020 Summit" was held. Labor reduced income tax rates in 2008, 2009 and 2010, and pensions were increased, as well as additional funding for health and education. A new Teen Dental Plan was launched, while around 100 laws relating to same-sex relationships in the LGBT community were changed after a HREOC enquiry found them to be discriminatory. In response to the 2008 financial crisis, the government passed economic stimulus packages, and Australia was one of the few western countries to avoid the late-2000s recession.

Between the 2007 federal election and the 2008 Western Australian state election, Labor was in government nationally, as well as in all eight state and territory legislatures. This was the first time any single party or any coalition had achieved this since the ACT and the NT gained self-government. After narrowly losing government in Western Australia at the 2008 state election and Victoria at the 2010 state election, Labor lost government in landslides in New South Wales at the 2011 state election and Queensland at the 2012 state election.

Rudd's leadership and prime ministership ended in the 2010 spill prior to the 2010 election with the replacement of Rudd as leader by deputy leader Julia Gillard. At the 2010 election Labor won 50.12% of the two-party vote, but resulted in a hung parliament. The incumbent Gillard government formed a minority government in the House of Representatives with the support of four crossbenchers – three independents and one Green, giving the government a one-seat parliamentary majority. Later changes in speaker and government support increased the parliamentary majority to three seats, then two seats. In the Senate, the Greens with nine seats went from a shared balance of power position to a sole balance of power position. The Gillard government introduced the Clean Energy Bill as a replacement for the Carbon Pollution Reduction Scheme (CPRS) in conjunction with compensation including further income tax cuts and an increase in the tax-free threshold, a Minerals Resource Rent Tax (MRRT) was introduced as a replacement for the Resource Super Profits Tax (RSPT), Gillard reached a health care agreement with state and territory leaders, introduced paid parental leave, plain cigarette packaging laws, the biggest cuts on consumer prices of medicines in Australian history under the Pharmaceutical Benefits Scheme (PBS), and allocated funding for children and concession holders to receive dental insurance through Medicare. The 2011 Labor National Conference supported a conscience vote for same-sex marriage in Australia through a private members bill.

On 19 February 2013, the Greens announced that Labor had ended the alliance between the two parties. Before the 2013 election, Rudd was restored as party leader and prime minister, but after his loss at the election, he resigned the party leadership and membership of House of Representatives.

== Opposition and Albanese Government ==
Following Labor's loss at the 2013 election and Rudd's resignation as leader, Bill Shorten was elected federal Labor leader in October by a new system which gave rank and file party members 50% of votes for the party leadership. At the 2016 federal election, held on 2 July, Labor increased its seats by 14, but the incumbent Liberal/National Coalition government led Malcolm Turnbull was returned with a single seat majority. At the 2019 federal election Labor had an upset and unexpected loss, losing some of the seats it gained at the 2016 election. Bill Shorten stood down as leader and Anthony Albanese was elected leader and led the party to victory in the 2022 election.

At the 2014 Victorian state election, Labor led by Daniel Andrews defeated the one-term Coalition government, and significantly increased its majority at the 2018 Victorian state election. At the 2014 South Australian state election, Labor led by Jay Weatherill won a record fourth term, but lost government at the 2018 South Australian state election. At the 2015 Queensland state election, despite the previous landslide, Labor led by Annastacia Palaszczuk defeated the one-term LNP government, and slightly increased its majority at the 2017 Queensland state election. At the 2016 Australian Capital Territory election, Labor, led by Andrew Barr, retained government for a record fifth term with the support of The Greens. At the 2016 Northern Territory election Labor led by Michael Gunner defeated the one-term CLP government. At the 2017 Western Australian state election, Labor led by Mark McGowan defeated the incumbent Liberal-National government. Labor was unsuccessful in the 2018 Tasmanian election. Labor also remained in opposition in New South Wales after losing the 2019 New South Wales election.

== Historic ALP splits ==
The federal Australian Labor Party has split three times:

- In 1916 over the issue of conscription in Australia during the First World War. Labor Prime Minister Billy Hughes supported the introduction of conscription, while the majority of his colleagues in the ALP and trade union movement opposed it. After failing to gain majority support for conscription in two national plebiscites which bitterly divided the country in the process, Hughes and his followers were expelled from the Labor Party. He first formed the National Labor Party before merging with the Commonwealth Liberal Party which formed the Nationalist Party of Australia, and remained prime minister until 1923. At the state level William Holman, also a supporter of conscription, quit the party at the same time and became Nationalist Party Premier of New South Wales.
- In 1931 over economic issues revolving around how best to handle the Great Depression in Australia. At the House-only 1929 election, the one-term Labor government led by James Scullin won a lower house majority but remained in minority in the upper house. The ALP was essentially split three ways, between those who believed in radical policies such as NSW Premier Jack Lang, who wanted to repudiate Australia's debt to British bondholders; proto-Keynesians such as federal Treasurer Ted Theodore; and believers in orthodox finance such as Prime Minister James Scullin and a senior minister in his government, Joseph Lyons. In 1931 Lyons and his supporters left the party and joined the Nationalist Party of Australia to form the United Australia Party, and became prime minister in 1932.
- In 1955 over communism which occurred during a period of the 1950s when the issue of communism and support for communist causes or governments caused great internal conflict in the Labor party and the trade union movement in general. From 1945 onward, staunchly anti-Communist Roman Catholic members (Catholics being an important traditional support base) in opposition to communist infiltration of unions, formed Industrial Groups to gain control of them, fostering intense internal conflict. After Labor's loss of the 1954 election, federal leader Dr H. V. Evatt "issued a statement attacking the Victorian ALP state executive". He blamed subversive activities of the "Groupers" for the defeat. After bitter public dispute many Groupers were expelled from the ALP and formed the Democratic Labour Party (DLP) whose intellectual leader was B. A. Santamaria. The DLP was heavily influenced by Catholic social teaching and had the support of the Catholic Archbishop of Melbourne, Daniel Mannix. Because of its "veto with a view to reunification" strategy, the DLP's preferences (see Australian electoral system) helped the Liberal Party of Australia remain in power for over two decades, but it was successfully undermined by the Whitlam Labor government during the 1970s, so that after 1978 the DLP was reduced to a small "rump" based in Victoria, which nevertheless continued to contest federal elections as the DLP (according to the parliamentary library election results for 1980 and onward), although it failed to win a federal seat until the 2010 federal election when John Madigan was elected as the final Senator for Victoria.

== List of federal leaders ==
The following is a list of federal Labor Party leaders:

Key:
Labor
Protectionist
Free Trade
Commonwealth Liberal
National Labor
Nationalist/United Australia
Country/National
Liberal
PM: Prime Minister
LO: Leader of the Opposition
†: Died in office

No.	Leader	Portrait	Term of Office		Position	Prime Minister
—	vacant		1 January 1901	20 May 1901	—	Barton
1	Chris Watson		20 May 1901	30 October 1907	— 1901–1904	Barton
1	Chris Watson		20 May 1901	30 October 1907	— 1901–1904	Deakin
1	Chris Watson		20 May 1901	30 October 1907	PM 1904	Watson
1	Chris Watson		20 May 1901	30 October 1907	LO 1904–1905	Reid
1	Chris Watson		20 May 1901	30 October 1907	— 1905–1907	Deakin
2	Andrew Fisher		30 October 1907	27 October 1915	— 1907–1908	Deakin
2	Andrew Fisher		30 October 1907	27 October 1915	PM 1908–1909	Fisher
2	Andrew Fisher		30 October 1907	27 October 1915	LO 1909–1910	Deakin
2	Andrew Fisher		30 October 1907	27 October 1915	PM 1910–1913	Fisher
2	Andrew Fisher		30 October 1907	27 October 1915	LO 1913–1914	Cook
2	Andrew Fisher		30 October 1907	27 October 1915	PM 1914–1915	Fisher
3	Billy Hughes		27 October 1915	14 November 1916	PM 1915–1916	Hughes
4	Frank Tudor		14 November 1916	10 January 1922†	— 1916–1917	Hughes
4	Frank Tudor		14 November 1916	10 January 1922†	LO 1917–1922	Hughes
—	vacant		10 January 1922	16 May 1922	—	Hughes
5	Matthew Charlton		16 May 1922	29 March 1928	LO 1922–1928	Hughes
5	Matthew Charlton		16 May 1922	29 March 1928	LO 1922–1928	Bruce
—	vacant		29 March 1928	26 April 1928	—	Bruce
6	James Scullin		26 April 1928	1 October 1935	LO 1928–1929	Bruce
6	James Scullin		26 April 1928	1 October 1935	PM 1929–1932	Scullin
6	James Scullin		26 April 1928	1 October 1935	LO 1932–1935	Lyons†
7	John Curtin		1 October 1935	5 July 1945†	LO 1935–1939	Lyons†
7	John Curtin		1 October 1935	5 July 1945†	LO 1939	Page
7	John Curtin		1 October 1935	5 July 1945†	LO 1939–1941	Menzies
7	John Curtin		1 October 1935	5 July 1945†	LO 1941	Fadden
7	John Curtin		1 October 1935	5 July 1945†	PM 1941–1945	Curtin
—	Frank Forde		5 July 1945	13 July 1945	PM 1945	Forde
8	Ben Chifley		13 July 1945	13 June 1951†	PM 1945–1949	Chifley
8	Ben Chifley		13 July 1945	13 June 1951†	LO 1949–1951	Menzies
—	vacant		13 June 1951	20 June 1951	—	Menzies
9	H. V. Evatt		20 June 1951	9 February 1960	LO 1951–1960	Menzies
—	vacant		9 February 1960	7 March 1960	—	Menzies
10	Arthur Calwell		7 March 1960	8 February 1967	LO 1960–1967	Menzies
10	Arthur Calwell		7 March 1960	8 February 1967	LO 1960–1967	Holt†
11	Gough Whitlam		8 February 1967	22 December 1977	LO 1967	Holt†
11	Gough Whitlam		8 February 1967	22 December 1977	LO 1967–1968	McEwen
11	Gough Whitlam		8 February 1967	22 December 1977	LO 1968–1971	Gorton
11	Gough Whitlam		8 February 1967	22 December 1977	LO 1971–1972	McMahon
11	Gough Whitlam		8 February 1967	22 December 1977	PM 1972–1975	Whitlam
11	Gough Whitlam		8 February 1967	22 December 1977	LO 1975–1977	Fraser
12	Bill Hayden		22 December 1977	3 February 1983	LO 1977–1983	Fraser
13	Bob Hawke		3 February 1983	20 December 1991	LO 1983	Fraser
13	Bob Hawke		3 February 1983	20 December 1991	PM 1983–1991	Hawke
14	Paul Keating		20 December 1991	11 March 1996	PM 1991–1996	Keating
—	vacant		11 March 1996	19 March 1996	—	Howard
15	Kim Beazley		19 March 1996	11 November 2001	LO 1996–2001	Howard
—	vacant		11 November 2001	22 November 2001	—	Howard
16	Simon Crean		22 November 2001	2 December 2003	LO 2001–2003	Howard
17	Mark Latham		2 December 2003	18 January 2005	LO 2003–2005	Howard
—	vacant		18 January 2005	28 January 2005	—	Howard
(15)	Kim Beazley		28 January 2005	4 December 2006	LO 2005–2006	Howard
18	Kevin Rudd		4 December 2006	24 June 2010	LO 2006–2007	Howard
18	Kevin Rudd		4 December 2006	24 June 2010	PM 2007–2010	Rudd
19	Julia Gillard		24 June 2010	26 June 2013	PM 2010–2013	Gillard
(18)	Kevin Rudd		26 June 2013	18 September 2013	PM 2013	Rudd
—	Chris Bowen		18 September 2013	13 October 2013	LO 2013	Abbott
20	Bill Shorten		13 October 2013	30 May 2019	LO 2013–2015	Abbott
20	Bill Shorten		13 October 2013	30 May 2019	LO 2015–2018	Turnbull
20	Bill Shorten		13 October 2013	30 May 2019	LO 2018–2019	Morrison
21	Anthony Albanese		30 May 2019	Present	LO 2019–2022	Morrison
21	Anthony Albanese		30 May 2019	Present	PM 2022–present	Albanese

== See also ==
- Leaders of the Australian Labor Party
- Australian Labor Party National Conference
- Australian labour movement
- Australian Labor Party (New South Wales Branch)
- Australian Labor Party (Victorian Branch)
- Australian Labor Party (South Australian Branch)
- Australian Labor Party (Australian Capital Territory Branch)

== Sources ==
- Bramble, Tom, and Rick Kuhn. Labor's Conflict: Big Business, Workers, and the Politics of Class (Cambridge University Press; 2011) 240 pages;
- Calwell, A. A. (1963). Labor's Role in Modern Society. Melbourne, Lansdowne Press
- Faulkner, John; Macintyre, Stuart (2001). True Believers – The story of the Federal Parliamentary Labor Party. Sydney: Allen & Unwin. ISBN 1-86508-609-6.
- McKinlay, Brian (1981). The ALP: A Short History of the Australian Labor Party. Melbourne: Drummond/Heinemann. ISBN 0-85859-254-1.
- McMullin, Ross (1991). The Light on the Hill: The Australian Labor Party 1891–1991. South Melbourne: Oxford University Press Australia. ISBN 0-19-553451-4.
