= Joseph O'Carroll =

Australian rules footballer and politician

Joe O'Carroll

Personal information
- Full name: Joseph Patrick O'Carroll
- Born: 21 March 1891; Enoggera, Queensland
- Died: 9 June 1965 (aged 74); Preston, Victoria
- Original team: Parade College
- Height: 169 cm (5 ft 7 in)
- Weight: 61 kg (134 lb)

Playing career^{1}
Years	Club	Games (Goals)
1920	Melbourne	3 (2)
- ^{1} Playing statistics correct to the end of 1920.

Joseph Patrick O’Carroll (21 March 1891 – 9 June 1965) was an Australian politician who was a Member of the Victorian Legislative Assembly for the Electoral district of Clifton Hill representing the Labor Party from 1949–1955 and the Australian Labor Party (Anti-Communist) (Democratic Labor Party) from March–April 1955.

He also was an Australian rules footballer who played with Melbourne in the Victorian Football League (VFL).

== Notes ==
Victorian Legislative Assembly
Preceded by Jack Cremean	Member for Clifton Hill; 1949–1955	District abolished
