= Division of Yarra =

Former Australian federal electoral division

Coordinates: 37.8000°S 144.9630°E

Yarra Australian House of Representatives Division
- Created: 1901
- Abolished: 1969
- Namesake: Yarra River

The Division of Yarra was an Australian electoral division in the state of Victoria. It was located in inner eastern suburban Melbourne, and was named after the Yarra River, which originally formed the eastern border of the Division, and eventually ran through it. It originally covered the suburbs of Abbotsford, Collingwood, Richmond, Clifton Hill. It also covered part of Fitzroy between 1922 and 1936, and then also covered Burnley and Hawthorn from 1937. In 1949, the Abbotsford, Collingwood and Clifton Hill areas were transferred to the new Division of Hoddle. After the latter was abolished in 1955, Abbotsford and Collingwood (but not Clifton Hill) were transferred back to Yarra. Since then, the boundaries did not change until the division was abolished in 1969.

The division was proclaimed in 1900, and was one of the original 65 divisions to be contested at the first federal election. It was abolished at the redistribution of 21 November 1968 along with the neighbouring division of Scullin, taking effect from the 1969 federal election. The area covered by the division was completely absorbed into the neighbouring division of Melbourne.

For its entire existence, it was a very safe Labor seat. It was held by only four MPs – Frank Tudor, a leader of the Australian Labor Party; James Scullin, the thirteenth Prime Minister of Australia; Stan Keon, an important figure in the Australian Labor Party split of 1955, and Jim Cairns, who would go on to become Deputy Prime Minister of Australia as the member for the Division of Lalor.

== Members ==
Image	Member	Party	Term	Notes
	Frank Tudor (1866–1922)	Labor	30 March 1901 – 10 January 1922	Served as Chief Government Whip in the House under Watson. Served as minister under Fisher and Hughes. Served as Opposition Leader from 1916 to 1922. Died in office
	James Scullin (1876–1953)	Labor	18 February 1922 – 31 October 1949	Previously held the Division of Corangamite. Served as Opposition Leader from 1928 to 1929, and 1932 to 1935. Served as Prime Minister from 1929 to 1932. Retired
	Stan Keon (1915–1987)	Labor	10 December 1949 – April 1955	Previously held the Victorian Legislative Assembly seat of Richmond. Lost seat
	Stan Keon (1915–1987)	Labor (Anti-Communist)	April 1955 – 10 December 1955	Previously held the Victorian Legislative Assembly seat of Richmond. Lost seat
	Jim Cairns (1914–2003)	Labor	10 December 1955 – 25 October 1969	Transferred to the Division of Lalor after Yarra was abolished in 1969
