= Industrial Groups =

Australian political groupings

The Industrial Groups were groups formed by the Australian Labor Party (ALP) in the late 1940s, by Catholic ALP members aligned with B. A. Santamaria's "Movement" within the ALP from 1944, to combat alleged Communist Party infiltration in the trade unions.

In the late 1930s and early 1940s, there was a belief among some people, notably within the Catholic Church, that the Communist Party of Australia was trying to infiltrate trade unions in Australia. In response, the Labor party set up "industrial groups" within trade unions to counter the perceived Communist threat.

In 1941, the Italian-Australian political scientist and anti-Communist activist B. A. Santamaria founded the Catholic Social Studies Movement ("The Movement") in Victoria, with the support of Victoria's Roman Catholic Archbishop, Daniel Mannix to impact on the postwar labour movement. "The Movement" quickly gained a large influence in the Industrial Groups. Members of these groups were informally called "Groupers".

"The Movement" and the "Groupers" were opposed not only to the Communist Party, but to those elements within the Labor Party whom they reportedly considered to be insufficiently opposed to communism. Alleging that the "Groupers" were exercising disproportionate influence within the ALP, the party leader, H. V. Evatt, turned against them following the 1954 federal election, precipitating the 1955 split in the Labor Party.

This resulted in many "Groupers" resigning or being expelled from the ALP, and the disaffiliation of several unions, and the formation of the Australian Labor Party (Anti-Communist), in 1957 becoming the Democratic Labor Party.

While the Movement and its Groupers achieved some success in the ALP and unions, the split in the ALP they caused and the preferencing of the Liberal Party by The Democratic Labor Party was instrumental in keeping the ALP out of power in Australia for almost 30 years.
