= Electoral district of Clifton Hill =

Former Victorian state electoral district

Coordinates: 37°47′S 145°00′E

Clifton Hill Victoria—Legislative Assembly
- State: Victoria
- Created: 1927
- Abolished: 1955
- Namesake: Suburb of Clifton Hill
- Demographic: Metropolitan

Electoral district of Clifton Hill was an electoral district of the Legislative Assembly in the Australian state of Victoria. It centred on the north-eastern Melbourne suburb of Clifton Hill.

== Members for Clifton Hill ==
Member	Party	Term
Maurice Blackburn	Labor	1927–1934
Bert Cremean	Labor	1934–1945
Jack Cremean	Labor	1945–1949
Joseph O'Carroll	Labor	1949–1955
Joseph O'Carroll	Labor (Anti-Communist)	1955
