= Division of Scullin (1955–1969) =

Former Australian federal electoral division

Scullin Australian House of Representatives Division
- Created: 1955
- Abolished: 1969
- Namesake: James Scullin

The Division of Scullin was an Australian Electoral Division in the state of Victoria. It was located in the inner northern suburbs of Melbourne. It included the suburbs of Carlton North, Fitzroy, Clifton, Brunswick East, Princes Hill and parts of Brunswick, Carlton and Collingwood. The western, northern and eastern boundaries were along Royal Parade, Sydney Road, Albion Street (Brunswick), and the Merri Creek.

The Division was named after Rt Hon James Scullin, Prime Minister of Australia in 1929–32. It was proclaimed at the redistribution of 10 August 1955 and replaced the abolished divisions of Burke (the Brunswick East area) and Hoddle (the Carlton North and Clifton Hill areas), both of which were only created six years prior in 1949. The new division was first contested at the 1955 federal election and was won by the previous Labor MP for Burke Ted Peters. It was abolished at the redistribution of 21 November 1968 along with the neighbouring Division of Yarra, coming into effect at the 1969 federal election. It was replaced by the surrounding divisions of Melbourne (to the south and southwest), Wills (to the northwest) and Batman (to the northeast).

At the same 1968 redistribution and also coming into effect at the 1969 election, the Division of Darebin (which was located further north around Preston and Reservoir) was renamed the Division of Scullin. That Division is not connected to this one, except in name.

During its 14 years of existence, the division did not undergo any boundary changes. It also only elected Peters during its existence.

== Members ==
Image	Member	Party	Term	Notes
	Ted Peters (1897–1980)	Labor	10 December 1955 – 29 September 1969	Previously held the Division of Burke. Retired after Scullin was abolished in 1969

== See also ==
- Division of Burke (1949–1955) - predecessor division around the Brunswick East area
- Division of Scullin - division of the same name and namesake but not related to this division
