= Division of Hoddle =

Former Australian federal electoral division

Hoddle Australian House of Representatives Division
- Created: 1949
- Abolished: 1955
- Namesake: Robert Hoddle

The Division of Hoddle was an Australian Electoral Division in Victoria. The division was created in 1949 and abolished in 1955. It was named for Robert Hoddle, the surveyor who laid out the street plan of the City of Melbourne. It was located in the inner suburbs of Melbourne, including Carlton North, Clifton Hill, Abbotsford, Collingwood and Fitzroy, and was a safe seat for the Australian Labor Party.

When the division was introduced in 1949, it replaced parts of the Division of Melbourne and Division of Yarra. When it was abolished in 1955, the western portion (Carlton North, Fitzroy and Clifton Hill) was replaced by the new Division of Scullin and the eastern portion (Collingwood and Abbotsford) was returned to the Division of Yarra. During its six years of existence, it did not undergo any boundary change.

== Members ==
| Image | Member | Party | Term | Notes |
|---|---|---|---|---|
| | Jack Cremean (1907–1982) | Labor | 10 December 1949 – April 1955 | Previously held the Victorian Legislative Assembly seat of Clifton Hill. Failed to win the Division of Scullin when Hoddle was abolished in 1955 |
| | Jack Cremean (1907–1982) | Labor (Anti-Communist) | April 1955 – 10 December 1955 | Previously held the Victorian Legislative Assembly seat of Clifton Hill. Failed to win the Division of Scullin when Hoddle was abolished in 1955 |
