= Jack Cremean =

Australian politician

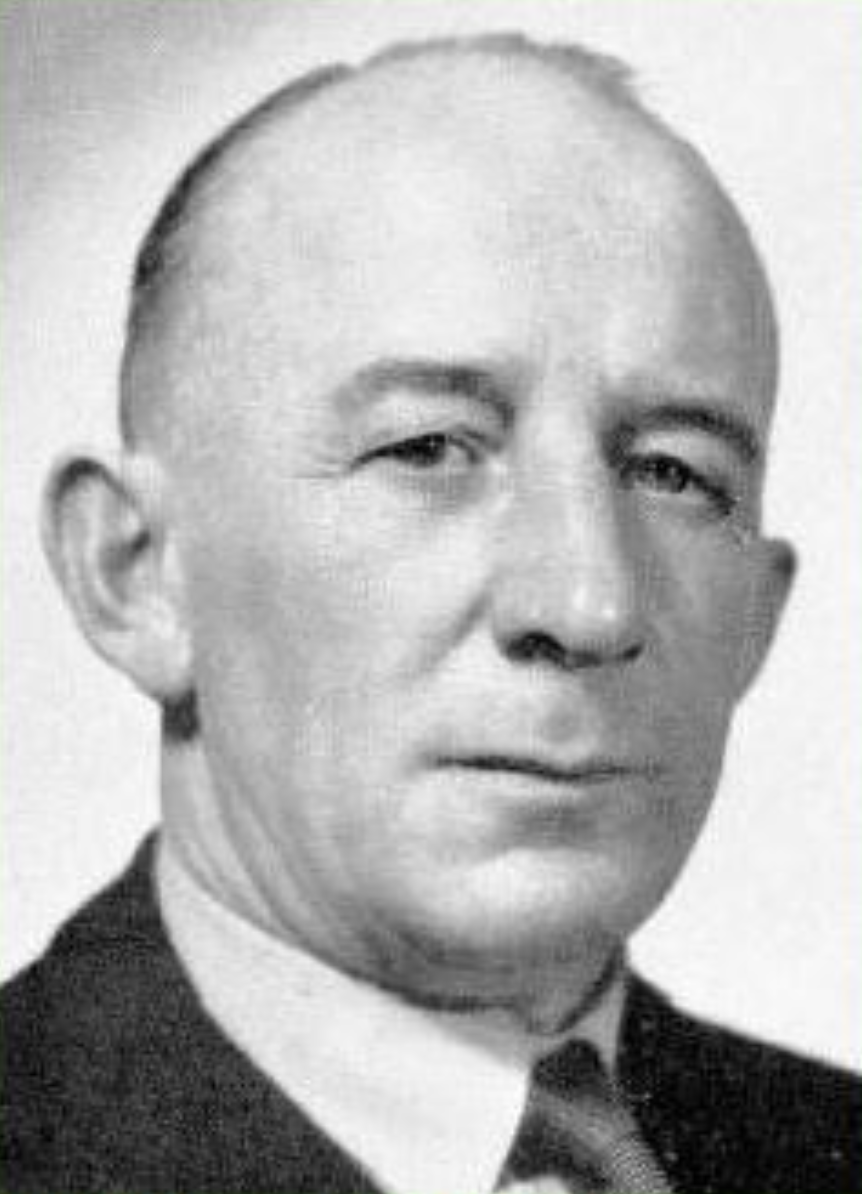

Member of the Australian Parliament for Hoddle
- In office 10 December 1949 – 10 December 1955
- Preceded by: New division
- Succeeded by: Division abolished

Personal details
- Born: John Lawrence Cremean; 26 January 1907 Richmond, Victoria, Australia
- Died: 11 August 1982 (aged 75) Kew, Victoria, Australia
- Party: Labor (1949–55); Labor (A-C) (1955)
- Relations: Bert Cremean (brother); Jack O'Connell (Australian politician)
- Occupation: Clerk

John Lawrence Cremean (26 January 1907 – 11 August 1982) was an Australian politician. Born in Melbourne, he was educated at Catholic schools before becoming a clerk. He was secretary to federal Labor minister Arthur Calwell from 1942 to 1945, secretary of the Fire Brigades Employees Union 1945–48, and also sat on Richmond City Council.

In 1945, Cremean's brother, Bert Cremean, died after surgery, and Jack was elected as a Labor member of the Victorian Legislative Assembly for Clifton Hill in the resulting by-election. In 1949, he transferred to federal politics, winning the new seat of Hoddle in the Australian House of Representatives. In 1955, Cremean was one of seven MPs who left the ALP and formed the Australian Labor Party (Anti-Communist), the precursor to the Democratic Labor Party. Cremean's seat of Hoddle was abolished for the 1955 election, so he contested its successor, Scullin, as an Anti-Communist, but was defeated by the Labor candidate, Ted Peters, the member for Burke. Cremean died in 1982.

Victorian Legislative Assembly
Preceded by Bert Cremean	Member for Clifton Hill; 1945–1949	Succeeded by Joseph O'Carroll
Parliament of Australia
New district	Member for Hoddle; 1949–1955	District abolished
