= Ted Peters (politician) =

Australian politician

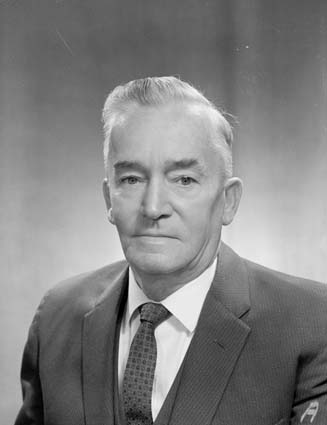

Member of the Australian Parliament for Burke
- In office 10 December 1949 – 10 December 1955
- Preceded by: New seat
- Succeeded by: Division abolished

Member of the Australian Parliament for Scullin
- In office 10 December 1955 – 29 September 1969
- Preceded by: New seat
- Succeeded by: Division abolished

Personal details
- Born: 12 June 1897 Melbourne, Victoria
- Died: 22 June 1980 (aged 83)
- Party: Australian Labor Party
- Occupation: Public servant

Edward William Peters (12 June 1897 – 22 June 1980) was an Australian politician. Born in Melbourne, he attended Catholic schools before becoming a clerk with the Victorian Public Service. He was president of the Victorian branch of the Clerks' Union and in 1934 was President of the Victorian Labor Party. In 1949, he was elected to the Australian House of Representatives as the Labor member for the new seat of Burke. He held the seat until 1955, when it was abolished; Peters contested the new seat of Scullin and was successful, defeating member for Hoddle Jack Cremean, whose seat had also been abolished, running for the Australian Labor Party (Anti-Communist). He held the seat until 1969, when it was abolished, and Peters retired. He died in 1980.

Parliament of Australia
New division	Member for Burke; 1949–1955	Division abolished
New division	Member for Scullin; 1955–1969	Division abolished
