= Australian Labor Party split of 1955 =

Factional division over communism

The Australian Labor Party split of 1955 was a split within the Australian Labor Party along ethnocultural lines and about the position towards communism. Key players in the split were the federal opposition leader H. V. "Doc" Evatt and B. A. Santamaria, the dominant force behind the "Catholic Social Studies Movement" or "the Movement".

| I have witnessed three disastrous splits in the Australian Labor Party during the past fifty-six years. ... The first split occurred in 1916 over conscription in World War I; the second in 1931 over the Premiers' Plan for economic recovery in the Great Depression; and the third in 1955 over alleged communist infiltration of the trade union movement. The last was the worst of the three, because the party has not yet healed the wounds that resulted from it. |
Arthur Calwell

Evatt denounced the influence of Santamaria's Movement on 5 October 1954, about 4 months after the 1954 federal election. The Victorian ALP state executive was officially dissolved, but both factions sent delegates to the 1955 Labor Party conference in Hobart. Movement delegates were excluded from the conference. They withdrew from the Labor party, going on to form the Australian Labor Party (Anti-Communist) which in 1957 became the Democratic Labor Party. The split then moved from federal level to states, predominantly Victoria and Queensland.

Historians, journalists, and political scientists have observed that the split was not a single event but a process that occurred over the early 1950s in state and federal Labor parties. The conservative Catholic and staunchly anti-ALP Democratic Labor Party used Australia's full-preference instant-runoff voting system to direct its preferences to benefit the Coalition two-party-preferred vote and was successful until 1972 in preventing the election of an Australian Labor Party federal government.

== Terminology ==
The Australian Labor Party split of 1955 is also referred to as the "Labor split of 1955", the "Labor split of 1954–55" or within the context of the Australian Labor Party and Roman Catholicism in Australia simply "the Split".

== Background ==
In the late 1930s and early 1940s, there was an effort by the Communist Party of Australia to infiltrate trade unions in Australia. In response, the Labor party instituted "industrial groups" within trade unions to counter the perceived Communist threat.

In Melbourne in the 1930s, a group of the city's Catholics, predominantly lawyers, formed "The Campion Society" and published The Catholic Worker. B. A. Santamaria, then a recent graduate of Melbourne Law School, became its editor. Australian Catholic bishops in 1937 established a National Secretariat for Catholic Action, and in 1939, Santamaria set up the National Catholic Rural Movement to promote conservative Catholic values among Catholic farmers. The NCRM claimed by the mid-1940s branches in all states except Tasmania, and a membership of over 5000. The NCRM promoted its objectives through and within other rural organisations and also politically. By 1941 Santamaria had also set up the "Catholic Social Studies Movement", commonly known as the "Movement". Besides promoting conservative Catholic values, Santamaria and the Movement were strongly anti-communist.

== Showdown ==
At the 1954 federal election, held in May, Labor received over 50% of the popular vote and won 57 seats (up 5) to the Coalition's 64. In September 1954, journalist Alan Reid published an exposé in The Sydney Sun about Santamaria. He wrote of him that:

"In the tense melodrama of politics there are mysterious figures who stand virtually unnoticed in the wings, invisible to all but a few of the audience, as they cue, Svengali-like, among the actors out on the stage."

On 5 October 1954 in a Press release, Dr H. V. Evatt blamed Labor's loss of seats and defeat in the 1954 federal election on "a small minority of members, located particularly in the State of Victoria", which were in conspiracy to undermine him. Evatt blamed Santamaria and his supporters in the Victorian Labor Party, called "the Groupers" . Santamaria exercised strong influence in the Cain government through "Movement" linked ministers such as Bill Barry, Frank Scully and Les Coleman. Protestant and left-wing ministers strongly opposed the Movement faction.

On 31 October 1954, the Sydney Sun-Herald reported on a letter sent by the Victorian Minister for Lands, Robert Holt, to the federal secretary of the Australian Labor Party, J. Schmella, which the paper described as 'probably as explosive, politically, as any document in Australia'. Holt stated -

"My charge is that the Victorian branch is controlled and directed in the main by one group or section through Mr. B. Santamaria ... My criticism is not personal. It is leveled against those ideas which are contrary to what I believe Labor policy to be. Moreover, I have been requested by my numerous and trusted friends, who happen to be Catholic, to fight against the influence of Mr. Santamaria and those he represents, when he seeks to implement his ideas through an abuse of a political movement, designed to serve a truly political purpose."

Holt spoke of events the previous year and describes attending a meeting of Santamaria's National Catholic Rural Movement Convention, following which he was, as Minister of Lands, approached by Santamaria and Frank Scully, where he was asked to use his position to make Crown land available to "Italians with foreign capital". When he refused, "Santamaria stated that I might not be in the next parliament", and Scully agreed. Holt considered this 'a direct threat' which was confirmed when another M.L.A. confided that there was 'pressure' to oppose him for party selection for his seat. He added that "subsequent events which happened during the selection ballot' had convinced him that the ALP's 'Victorian branch is not free to implement Labor policy and connives with this method." He concluded by stating his belief in:

'a party machine which permits the true expression of opinion of its members, regardless of who or what they may be. The only requirement is loyalty to Labor ideals and principles. This is not possible in the present circumstances...'

Holt introduced the Land Bill without Santamaria's desired advantage and it was at first amended by another ALP member, then defeated, amended again and passed – with what Santamaria wanted – after two Liberal party members "switched sides". In December 1954, Santamaria launched a suit against Holt for libel, citing the letter published in-full by the Sun-Herald. The libel action was withdrawn, without explanation, in April 1955.

In Victoria, Dr Mannix strongly supported Santamaria, but in New South Wales, Norman Cardinal Gilroy, the Archbishop of Sydney and the first Australian-born Roman Catholic cardinal, opposed him, favouring the traditional alliance between the Church and Labor. Gilroy's influence in Rome helped to end official Church support for the Groupers. In January 1955, Santamaria used Dr Mannix as his witness to the statement, "There is no Catholic organisation seeking to dominate the Labor Party or any other political party ... So that there will be no equivocation, Catholics are not associated with any other secular body seeking to dominate the Labor Party or any other political party."

Santamaria made this statement when he denied charges from the general secretary of the Australian Workers' Union (Mr T Dougherty) that the "No. 2 man in the Victorian ALP" (Frank McManus), the "No. 2 man in the NSW Labor Party" (J. Kane) and the "secretary of the Australian Rules Football Association of Queensland" (Mr Polgrain) were Santamaria's "top lieutenants in The Movement". For his part, McManus suggested that Dougherty "appeared to have contracted an ailment from one of his political colleagues ... the chief symptom of this ailment was that the sufferer believed he was always detecting conspiracy theories".

In early 1955 the Labor Party's Federal executive dissolved the Victorian state executive and appointed a new executive in its place. Both executives sent delegates to the 1955 National Conference in Hobart, where the delegates from the old executive were excluded from the conference. The Victorian branch then split between pro-Evatt and pro-Santamaria factions, and in March the pro-Evatt state executive suspended 24 members of state Parliament suspected of being Santamaria supporters. (Santamaria was not a party member.) Four ministers were forced to resign from John Cain's Labor government. Four unions were also disaffiliated from the ALP after the split. The unions were the 'right-wing' Federated Clerks Union, the Shop, Distributive and Allied Employees Association, the Federated Ironworkers' Association of Australia and the Amalgamated Society of Carpenters and Joiners.

On the night of 19 April 1955, Henry Bolte raised a motion of no-confidence against Cain's government in the Legislative Assembly. After twelve hours of debate on the motion, in the early hours of 20 April, 11 of the expelled Labor members crossed the floor to support Bolte's motion. With his government defeated, Cain sought and received a dissolution of parliament later that day.

== Electoral repercussions ==
At the ensuing May 1955 Victorian state election, the expelled members and others stood as the Australian Labor Party (Anti-Communist). It drew 12.6% of the vote, mainly from the ALP, but because its vote was widely spread only one of its candidates, the expelled Labor member Frank Scully, was re-elected. The party directed its 12.6% vote to the Coalition, and most of its supporters followed the party's preferences. Labor won 37.6% of the vote and 20 seats to the Liberals' 34 and the Country Party's ten.

The Australian Labor Party (Anti-Communist) went on in 1957 to be the nucleus of the Democratic Labor Party.

At the 1958 Victorian state election, similar tactics were used. The DLP won 14.4% of the vote but even Scully lost his seat, and most of the preferences went to the Coalition. The ALP received 37.7% of the vote.

In New South Wales, Labor leader and premier Joseph Cahill decisively won the 1953 NSW election. He was desperate to keep the New South Wales branch united during the split. He achieved this by controlling the anti-DLP faction in his party. The DLP did not contest the 1956 NSW election and Cahill was returned in the 1959 NSW election, but died in office later that year. He was succeeded as leader and premier by Robert Heffron. Heffron continued the Labor reign in New South Wales winning the 1962 NSW election. Heffron resigned the leadership and premiership in 1964, and was succeeded by Jack Renshaw, who lost the premiership at the 1965 NSW election ending 24 years of Labor power in the state.

In Queensland, Labor leader and premier Vince Gair since 1952 was expelled from the Labor party in 1957 because of his support of the Groupers. Gair had previously attempted to mobilise the Industrial Groups to counteract a perceived communist influence of the Australian Workers' Union in the Queensland Trades and Labor Council. With other Queensland caucus members, Gair went on to form the Queensland Labor Party. As happened two years earlier in Victoria, the split destroyed the Labor government; Gair was defeated on a no-confidence motion, and in the resulting election the two wings of Labor were reduced to only 31 seats between them. Labor would remain in opposition until 1989. Gair's QLP was absorbed into the DLP in 1962.

== Long-term consequences ==
=== Directing preferences to the Liberals ===
From the 1955 election until the demise of the party, the DLP directed its supporters to give their electoral preferences to the Liberals, ahead of the ALP. Santamaria intended to keep Labor from winning government until it accepted his terms for reunification. On two occasions—1961 and 1969—Labor actually won a majority of the two-party vote, but DLP preferences resulted in Labor coming up just short of ending the Coalition's hold on government.

== Re-affiliation of unions ==
The first of four unions disaffiliated after the split of 1955, attempted to return at the ALP Victorian State Conference in 1983. The Federated Clerks and three other similarly aligned 'right-wing' unions – the Shop, Distributive and Allied Employees Association, the Federated Ironworkers' Association of Australia and the Amalgamated Society of Carpenters and Joiners – had their re-affiliation cases considered by a special Victorian ALP committee of ten which split on the decision 5 for and against 5 and had submitted separate reports to the State Conference. The Federated Clerks' case, 'after a bitter and at times acrimonious 3 and a 1/2 hour debate', which was 'centered on alleged links' with Santamaria, the National Civic Council, and the Industrial Action Fund, was defeated at the State Conference by 289 votes to 189. It was noted in a news report of the time that all four were likely to appeal to the federal ALP executive and that they had the support of then Prime Minister Bob Hawke. The ALP federal executive supported the re-affiliation before the 1985 Victorian State Conference while two of the unions were refused re-affiliation in the Northern Territory later that year. Ultimately, all four returned as ALP affiliated unions in some form; the Federated Clerks' Union amalgamated into the affiliated Australian Services Union in 1993, the Shop, Distributive and Allied Employees Association is a current ALP affiliated union, while the Federated Ironworkers' Association of Australia and the Amalgamated Society of Carpenters and Joiners amalgamated with the affiliated Australian Workers' Union.

== See also ==
- History of the Australian Labor Party
- Australian Labor Party split of 1916
- Australian Labor Party split of 1931
