= Democratic Labor Party (Australia, 1955) =

Former Australian political party

Democratic Labor Party Australian Labor Party (Anti-Communist) (1955–1957)
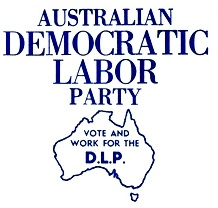
- Abbreviation: DLP
- Founded: 1955 (as Australian Labor Party (Anti-Communist))
- Dissolved: March 1978
- Split from: Australian Labor Party
- Succeeded by: Democratic Labour Party (1978)
- Ideology: Anti-communism; Social conservatism Christian democracy Distributism
- Slogan: "The Real Alternative!"
- House of Representatives: 7 / 124 (1955)
- Senate: 5 / 60 (1970−74)
- Victorian Legislative Assembly: 12 / 66 (1955)

The Democratic Labor Party (DLP) was an Australian political party. The party came into existence following the 1955 ALP split as the Australian Labor Party (Anti-Communist), and was renamed the Democratic Labor Party in 1957. In 1962, the Queensland Labor Party, a breakaway party of the Queensland branch of the Australian Labor Party, became the Queensland branch of the DLP.

In 1978, a new Democratic Labor Party was founded by members of the original party, which remains active as of 2026.

== History ==
=== Origins ===
The Australian Labor Party (Anti-Communist) was formed as a result of a split in the Australian Labor Party (ALP) which began in 1954. The split was between the party's national leadership, under the then party leader Dr H. V. Evatt, and the majority of the Victorian branch, which was dominated by a faction composed largely of ideologically-driven anti-Communist Catholics. Many ALP members during the Cold War period, most but not all of them Catholics, became alarmed at what they saw as the growing power of the Communist Party of Australia within the country's trade unions. These members formed units within the unions, called Industrial Groups, to combat this alleged infiltration.

The intellectual leader of the Victorian Catholic wing of the ALP was B. A. Santamaria, a Roman Catholic Italian-Australian Melbourne lawyer and lay anti-Communist activist, who acquired the patronage of Dr Mannix. Santamaria headed The Catholic Social Studies Movement (often known as The Movement), modeled on Catholic Action groups in Europe and, ironically, in organizational terms, on some of the methods employed by its principal target, the Communist Party of Australia. That group later became the National Civic Council (NCC). Evatt denounced the "Movement" and the Industrial Groups in 1954, alleging they were disloyal and trying to deflect the Labour Movement from pursuing Labor objectives.

At the 1955 ALP national conference in Hobart, Santamaria's parliamentary supporters in the federal and Victorian parliaments were expelled from the ALP. A total of seven Victorian federal MPs and 18 state MPs were expelled. The federal MPs were: Tom Andrews, Bill Bourke, Bill Bryson, Jack Cremean, Bob Joshua, Stan Keon and Jack Mullens. In New South Wales, the Roman Catholic Archbishop of Sydney, Norman Cardinal Gilroy, the first native-born Australian Roman Catholic prelate, opposed the Movement's tactics, and there was no party split in that state.

The expelled ALP members formed the Australian Labor Party (Anti-Communist) under the influence of B. A. Santamaria. Ideologically, the ALP (Anti-Communist) followed universalism and kept the NCC anti-communist position. The DLP started opposing the White Australia policy as early as 1957 even while both major parties supported it.

=== 1950s to 1970s ===
==== 1955 elections ====
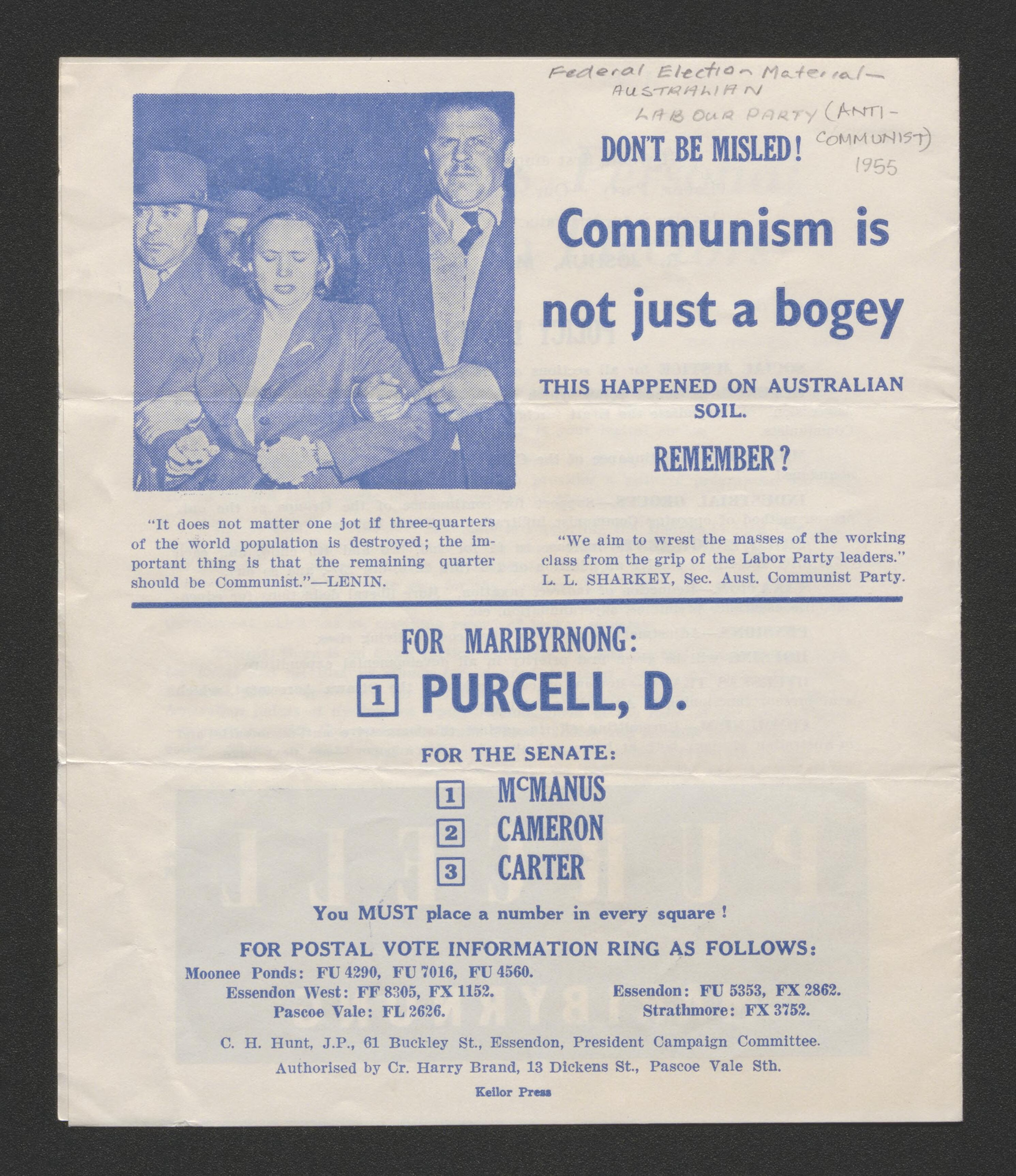
Campaign material used by the Australian Labor Party (Anti-Communist) at the 1955 federal election, referencing the Petrov Affair

Seventeen state representatives were suspended from the Labor caucus, likewise suspending the majority of John Cain's Labor government in the Victorian Legislative Assembly. The suspended members held a caucus of their own on 30 March 1955 where the founded their own party; electing Bill Barry and Les Coleman leaders in the lower and upper house respectively. On the night of 19 April, Liberal and Country Party leader Henry Bolte moved a motion of no-confidence against John Cain's Labor government in the Victorian Legislative Assembly. After twelve hours of debate on the motion, in the early hours of 20 April, 11 of the expelled Labor members crossed the floor to support Bolte's motion. With his government defeated, Cain sought and received a dissolution of parliament later that day, with the election set down for 28 May 1955.

At the election, 11 of the 12 expelled MPs in the Victorian Legislative Assembly, as well as other candidates, and the one MP facing re-election in the Victorian Legislative Council lost their seats. The party drew 12.6% of the vote, mainly from the ALP, which was directed to the non-Labor parties. Labor won 37.6% of the vote and 20 seats to the Liberals' 34 and the Country Party's ten. The Cain Labor Government lost government at the 1955 election. Only one of the expelled Labor members, Frank Scully, was re-elected for the seat of Richmond. Scully had been a Minister in the Cain Government and a member of the Movement, and was expelled from the ministry and the ALP as part of the 1955 split. Five other MPs whose terms had not expired remained in the Legislative Council until the expiry of their terms at the 1958 Victorian election, and all who recontested their seats were defeated.

At the 1955 federal election held in December, all the 7 expelled federal MPs were defeated. However, Frank McManus was elected as a senator for Victoria at the 1955 election, and successful ALP candidate George Cole had chosen before the election to become part of this party.

==== Membership ====
The parliamentary membership of the ALP (Anti-Communist) was almost entirely Roman Catholic of Irish descent. The only two non-Catholics were its federal leader, Bob Joshua, who represented Ballarat in the Australian House of Representatives, and Jack Little, who led the party in the Victoria Legislative Council between 1955 and 1958. It has been suggested that the party was substantially a party of Irish-ethnics, a result of the ALP split of 1955 being a 'de-ethnicisation', a forcible removal of the Irish-Catholic element within the ALP. However, many ALP (Anti-Communist) members were not of Irish descent. The party attracted many voters among migrants from Catholic countries in southern Europe, and among anti-Communist Eastern European refugees.

A significant minority of its voters were also non-Catholics. Journalist Don Whitington argued in 1964 that the DLP, as a basically sectarian party, was a most dangerous and distasteful force in Australian politics. Whitington observed that the party was backed by influential sections of the Roman Catholic Church, and that although the party professed to exist primarily to combat communism, it had less commendable reasons behind its coming into being. Daniel Mannix, the Roman Catholic Archbishop of Melbourne, was a DLP supporter, as were other influential clerics.

==== Democratic Labor Party ====
In 1957, the ALP (A-C) changed its name to the Democratic Labor Party (DLP), although the exact date of the party's renaming is unclear. At least one source claims it was renamed in 1956, but this appears to have been the founding of a DLP in New South Wales (where an ALP split had largely been avoided). The NSW DLP was separate to the ALP (A-C), and NSW DLP president Alan Manning said it was not connected "in anyway" to the Victorian-based party, saying "if B. A. Santamaria joined the Democratic Labor Party I would get out of it". The Tasmanian branch of the ALP (A-C) chose to affiliate with the NSW DLP in February 1957, and Tribune reported that Manning was "trying to link the anti-Communist Labor Parties and the DLP into a national party". Beginning in May 1957, the DLP name began to be used outside of NSW. On 27 August 1957, Tasmanian senator George Cole officially informed the Senate that the ALP (A-C) has been renamed to the DLP following a conference held on 18 August 1957.

In the same year, the Labor Party split in Queensland following the expulsion of Vince Gair, a conservative Catholic, from the party. He and his followers formed the Queensland Labor Party, which, in 1962, became the Queensland branch of the DLP.

Between 1955 and 1974 the DLP was able to command a significant vote, particularly in Victoria and Queensland, with their large numbers of Catholics. During the period the party held between one and five seats in the Senate (which is elected by proportional representation). The DLP Senate leaders were George Cole (from Tasmania; 1955–1965), Vince Gair (from Queensland; 1965–1973), and Frank McManus (from Victoria; 1973–1974). Other DLP Senators were Condon Byrne (from Queensland), Jack Kane (from New South Wales), and Jack Little, a Protestant (from Victoria).

No DLP senators or state politicians were ever elected in South Australia or Western Australia. Owing largely to demographic reasons, the ALP did not split in these states, although some lay branch members switched to the new party once it had been established. As the ALP and the conservative parties traditionally held approximately equal numbers of seats in the Senate, the DLP was able to use the balance of power in the Senate to extract concessions from Liberal governments, particularly larger government grants to Catholic schools, greater spending on defence, and non-recognition of the People's Republic of China.

During this period the DLP exercised influence by directing its preferences to Liberal candidates in federal and state elections (see Australian electoral system), thus helping to keep the ALP out of office at the federal level and in Victoria. The DLP vote for the House of Representatives gradually declined during the 1960s, but remained strong enough for the Liberals to continue to need DLP preferences to win close elections.

After Evatt's retirement in 1960, his successor Arthur Calwell, a Catholic, tried to bring about a reconciliation between the ALP and the DLP. Negotiations were conducted through intermediaries, and in 1965 a deal was almost done. Three out of four of the ALP's parliamentary leaders agreed to a deal. However, Calwell refused to share power within the party with the DLP leadership on a membership number basis, so the deal failed. Santamaria later claimed that had he accepted, Calwell could have become prime minister. Indeed, at the 1961 federal election Labor came up just two seats short of toppling the Coalition. One of those seats was Bruce, in the DLP's heartland of Melbourne. DLP preferences allowed Liberal Billy Snedden to win a paper-thin victory. Although the Coalition was only assured of a sixth term in government later in the night with an even narrower win in the Brisbane-area seat of Moreton, any realistic chance of a Labor win ended with the Liberals retaining Bruce. Without Bruce, the best Labor could have done was a hung parliament.

At the 1969 federal election, DLP preferences kept Calwell's successor Gough Whitlam from toppling the Coalition, despite winning an 18-seat swing and a majority of the two-party vote. DLP preferences in four Melbourne-area seats allowed the Liberals to narrowly retain them; had those preferences gone the other way, Labor would have garnered the swing it needed to make Whitlam Prime Minister.

The DLP's policies were traditional Labor policies such as more spending on health, education and pensions, combined with strident opposition to communism, and a greater emphasis on defence spending. The DLP strongly supported Australia's participation in the Vietnam War.

From the early 1960s onward the DLP became increasingly socially conservative, opposing homosexuality, abortion, pornography and drug use. This stand against "permissiveness" appealed to many conservative voters as well as the party's base among Catholics. Some members of the DLP disagreed with this, believing the party should stay focused on anti-communism.

The highest DLP vote was 11.11 per cent, which occurred at the 1970 half-senate election. Whitlam and the ALP won government in the 1972 election, defeating the DLP's strategy of keeping the ALP out of power.

=== Decline ===
In 1973, it was reported that the Country Party and the DLP were considering a merger. In response, Gough Whitlam said he was delighted to see "the old harlot churched".

By this point, the party's emphasis on Senate results had led to a steady decline in their primary vote for the House of Representatives, and according to Tom King of Australian National University a large amount of the support for the DLP by this point came as a result of protest votes against the two major parties, rather than any definitive ideological base. A softening of attitudes towards Communism both in Australia and within the Catholic Church meant that the party increasingly sounded old-fashioned and ideologically adrift, a perception that was not helped by the advanced age of the DLP's parliamentarians.

In 1974, Whitlam appointed Gair as ambassador to Ireland in a successful bid to split the DLP and remove its influence. The party lost all its Senate seats at the 1974 federal election.

In April 1976, the Queensland and South Australian branches of the DLP were dissolved. The party only stood candidates in Victoria at the 1977 federal election, without success. In April 1978 it was reported in The Bulletin that the New South Wales state council would meet in June 1978 to determine the future of the party.

In March 1978, the Victorian branch voted to dissolve. The vote to dissolve was carried by 110 votes to 100. Some members of the party refused to accept the vote and formed a continuity DLP, which they claimed was a continuation of the original DLP. However, that claim was disputed by almost all the officers of the original DLP.

== Electoral results ==
House of Representatives

Election	Votes	%	Seats	+/–	Position
1955	227,083	5.17	0 / 75	▼7	▲4th
1958 (Note: Including Queensland Labor Party.)	469,723	9.41	0 / 75	0	4th
1961 (Note: Including Queensland Labor Party.)	456,962	8.71	0 / 75	0	4th
1963	407,416	7.44	0 / 75	0	4th
1966	417,411	7.31	0 / 75	0	4th
1969	367,977	6.02	0 / 75	0	4th
1972	346,415	5.25	0 / 75	0	4th
1974	104,974	1.42	0 / 75	0	4th
1975	101,750	1.32	0 / 75	0	4th
1977	113,271	1.43	0 / 75	0	4th

Senate

Election year	# of overall votes	% of overall vote	# of overall seats won	# of overall seats	+/–
1955	271,067	6.10	1 / 30	2 / 60	▲1
1958	314,755	6.82	1 / 32	2 / 60	0
1961	388,466	8.07	0 / 31	1 / 60	▼1
1964	433,511	8.39	2 / 30	2 / 60	▲1
1967	540,006	9.77	2 / 30	4 / 60	▲2
1970	625,142	11.11	3 / 32	5 / 60	▲1
1974	235,343	3.56	0 / 60	0 / 60	▼5
1975	191,049	2.67	0 / 64	0 / 64	0
1977	123,192	1.67	0 / 34	0 / 64	0

== Leaders ==
No.	Image	Name	Term start	Term end	Office
1		Bob Joshua	7 April 1955	10 December 1955	MP for Ballarat
2		George Cole	8 May 1956	23 June 1965	Senator for Tasmania
3		Vince Gair	23 June 1965	10 October 1973	Senator for Queensland
4		Frank McManus	10 October 1973	18 May 1974	Senator for Victoria

== Members of parliament ==
=== House of Representatives ===
- Tom Andrews (Darebin, Vic), 1955
- Bill Bourke (Fawkner, Vic), 1955
- Bill Bryson (Wills, Vic), 1955
- Jack Cremean (Gellibrand, Vic), 1955
- Bob Joshua (Ballarat, Vic), 1955 (Protestant)
- Stan Keon (Yarra, Vic), 1955
- Jack Mullens (Hoddle, Vic), 1955

=== Senate ===
- George Cole (Tas), 1955–65
- Frank McManus (Vic), 1955–62, 1965–74
- Vince Gair (Qld), 1965–74
- Condon Byrne (Qld), 1968–74 (QLP Senator 1957–59)
- Jack Little (Vic), 1968–74 (Protestant)
- Jack Kane (NSW), 1970–74

=== Victorian Legislative Assembly ===
- Bill Barry (Carlton), 1955
- Stan Corrigan (Port Melbourne), 1955
- Leslie D'Arcy (Grant), 1955
- George Fewster (Essendon), 1955
- Tom Hayes (Melbourne), 1955
- Michael Lucy (Ivanhoe), 1955
- Edmund Morrissey (Mernda), 1955
- Charles Murphy (Hawthorn), 1955
- Joseph O'Carroll (Clifton Hill), 1955
- Peter Randles (Brunswick), 1955
- Frank Scully (Richmond), 1955–58
- George White (Mentone), 1955

=== Victorian Legislative Council ===
- Bert Bailey (Melbourne West), 1955–58
- Thomas Brennan (Monash), 1955–58
- Les Coleman (Melbourne West), 1955
- Paul Jones (Doutta Galla), 1955–58
- Jack Little (Melbourne North), 1955–58 (Protestant)
- Pat Sheehy (Melbourne), 1955–58

=== New South Wales Legislative Assembly ===
- Kevin Harrold (Gordon), 1973–76

=== Queensland Legislative Assembly ===
- Les Diplock (Aubigny), 1962–72 (QLP 1957–62) (Protestant)
- Paul Hilton (Carnarvon), 1962–63 (QLP 1957–62)

== See also ==
- Liberal–National Coalition (1950s-1970s)
- Democratic Labour Party (Australia, 1978)
- Australian Labor Party
- Social Democratic Labour Party of Norway - anti-communist breakaway from the Labour Party in the 1920s
- National Labour Party (Ireland) - similar anti-communist splinter from the Labour Party in 1940s Ireland
- Italian Democratic Socialist Party - anti-communist split from the Italian Socialist Party in the 1940s
- Right Socialist Party of Japan - party formed from the anti-communist wing of the Japan Socialist Party in the 1950s
- Democratic Socialists '70 - anti-communist split from the Labour Party in the Netherlands in the 1970s
- Social Democratic Party (UK) - social democratic splinter from the Labour Party in the 1980s
