= Division of Burke (1949–1955) =

Former Australian federal electoral division

Burke Australian House of Representatives Division
- Created: 1949
- Abolished: 1955
- Namesake: Robert O'Hara Burke

The Division of Burke was an Australian Electoral Division in Victoria. The division was named after Robert O'Hara Burke, an explorer who led the Victorian expedition in 1860, the first white explorer to cross Australia from south to north.

The division was created in 1949 and replaced the similarly located and pronounced division of Bourke. It was located in the inner suburbs of Melbourne, including Brunswick, Brunswick and Brunswick East and parts of Fitzroy North, Princes Hill and Carlton North. It was abolished in 1954 (coming into effect at the 1955 election), and was replaced by the new division of Scullin, which also covered the Brunswick East area.

During its six years of existence, it did not undergo any boundary change. It was a safe seat for the Australian Labor Party and was only won by Ted Peters. Peters transferred to Scullin after Burke was abolished.

== Members ==
Image	Member	Party	Term	Notes
	Ted Peters (1897–1980)	Labor	10 December 1949 – 10 December 1955	Transferred to the Division of Scullin after Burke was abolished in 1955

== See also ==
- Division of Bourke - predecessor division around the Brunswick areas
- Division of Scullin (1955–1969) - successor division around the Brunswick East area
- Division of Burke (1969-2004) - division of the same name and namesake but not related to this division
