= Electoral results for the Division of Flinders =

Australian division election results

This is a list of electoral results for the Division of Flinders in Australian federal elections from the division's creation in 1901 until the present.

== Members ==
Member	Party	Term
Arthur Groom	Free Trade	1901–1903
James Gibb	Free Trade/Anti-Socialist	1903–1906
(Sir) William Irvine	Anti-Socialist	1906–1909
(Sir) William Irvine	Liberal	1909–1917
(Sir) William Irvine	Nationalist	1917–1918
Stanley Bruce	Nationalist	1918–1929
Jack Holloway	Labor	1929–1931
Stanley Bruce	United Australia	1931–1933
James Fairbairn	United Australia	1933–1940
Rupert Ryan	United Australia	1940–1945
Rupert Ryan	Liberal	1945–1952
Keith Ewert	Labor	1952–1954
Robert Lindsay	Liberal	1954–1966
(Sir) Phillip Lynch	Liberal	1966–1982
Peter Reith	Liberal	1982–1983
Bob Chynoweth	Labor	1983–1984
Peter Reith	Liberal	1984–2001
Greg Hunt	Liberal	2001–2022
Zoe McKenzie	Liberal	2022–present

== Election results ==
=== Elections in the 2020s ===
==== 2025 ====
2025 Australian federal election: Flinders
Party	Candidate	Votes	%	±%
Trumpet of Patriots	Jason Smart			
Independent	Ben Smith			
Liberal	Zoe McKenzie			
One Nation	Mike Brown			
Independent	Joseph Toscano			
Labor	Sarah Race			
Greens	Adam Frogley			
Total formal votes				
Informal votes				
Turnout				

==== 2022 ====
2022 Australian federal election: Flinders
Party	Candidate	Votes	%	±%
Liberal	Zoe McKenzie	43,013	43.49	−3.23
Labor	Surbhi Snowball	21,487	21.73	−3.01
Greens	Colin Lane	9,293	9.40	+2.59
Independent	Despi O'Connor	7,163	7.24	+7.24
Independent	Sarah Russell	5,189	5.25	+5.25
United Australia	Alex van der End	4,472	4.52	+2.00
One Nation	Cyndi Marr	3,373	3.41	+3.41
Liberal Democrats	Chrysten Abraham	2,366	2.39	+2.39
Animal Justice	Pamela Engelander	2,060	2.08	−0.30
Federation	Jefferson Earl	486	0.49	+0.49
Total formal votes		98,902	94.56	+0.50
Informal votes		5,687	5.44	−0.50
Turnout		104,589	91.41	−1.82
Two-party-preferred result
Liberal	Zoe McKenzie	56,075	56.70	+1.06
Labor	Surbhi Snowball	42,827	43.30	−1.06
Liberal hold		Swing	+1.06	

Alluvial diagram for preference flows in the seat of Flinders in the 2022 federal election. indicates at what stage the winning candidate had over 50% of the votes and was declared the winner.

=== Elections in the 2010s ===
==== 2019 ====
2019 Australian federal election: Flinders
Party	Candidate	Votes	%	±%
Liberal	Greg Hunt	45,293	46.72	−3.78
Labor	Josh Sinclair	23,982	24.74	−2.80
Independent	Julia Banks	13,367	13.79	+13.79
Greens	Nathan Lesslie	6,599	6.81	−4.18
United Australia	Christine McShane	2,447	2.52	+2.52
Animal Justice	James Persson	2,304	2.38	−1.45
Sustainable Australia	Reade Smith	1,072	1.11	+1.11
Independent	Susie Beveridge	948	0.98	+0.98
Independent	Harry Dreger	940	0.97	+0.97
Total formal votes		96,952	94.06	−1.90
Informal votes		6,124	5.94	+1.90
Turnout		103,076	93.11	+2.28
Two-party-preferred result
Liberal	Greg Hunt	53,943	55.64	−1.37
Labor	Josh Sinclair	43,009	44.36	+1.37
Liberal hold		Swing	−1.37	

==== 2016 ====
2016 Australian federal election: Flinders
Party	Candidate	Votes	%	±%
Liberal	Greg Hunt	52,412	51.60	−3.74
Labor	Carolyn Gleixner	27,459	27.03	+1.83
Greens	Willisa Hogarth	10,868	10.70	+0.96
Animal Justice	Ben Wild	4,347	4.28	+4.28
Rise Up Australia	Yvonne Gentle	3,381	3.33	+2.82
Independent	Shane Lewis	3,107	3.06	+3.06
Total formal votes		101,574	96.34	+1.31
Informal votes		3,863	3.66	−1.31
Turnout		105,437	91.40	−2.34
Two-party-preferred result
Liberal	Greg Hunt	58,683	57.77	−4.04
Labor	Carolyn Gleixner	42,891	42.23	+4.04
Liberal hold		Swing	−4.04	

==== 2013 ====
2013 Australian federal election: Flinders
Party	Candidate	Votes	%	±%
Liberal	Greg Hunt	51,972	55.34	+1.01
Labor	Joshua Sinclair	23,666	25.20	−6.54
Greens	Martin Rush	9,148	9.74	−1.76
Palmer United	Linda Clark	5,639	6.00	+6.00
Family First	David Clark	1,091	1.16	−1.26
Independent	Paul Madigan	708	0.75	+0.75
Christians	Ashleigh Belsar	523	0.56	+0.56
Rise Up Australia	Angela Dorian	481	0.51	+0.51
Independent	Denis McCormack	478	0.51	+0.51
Non-Custodial Parents	John Zabaneh	215	0.23	+0.23
Total formal votes		93,921	95.03	−0.85
Informal votes		4,916	4.97	+0.85
Turnout		98,837	93.79	+0.54
Two-party-preferred result
Liberal	Greg Hunt	58,048	61.81	+2.67
Labor	Joshua Sinclair	35,873	38.19	−2.67
Liberal hold		Swing	+2.67	

==== 2010 ====
2010 Australian federal election: Flinders
Party	Candidate	Votes	%	±%
Liberal	Greg Hunt	49,146	54.30	−0.17
Labor	Francis Gagliano-Ventura	28,747	31.76	−2.12
Greens	Robert Brown	10,410	11.50	+3.02
Family First	Reade Smith	2,198	2.43	+0.19
Total formal votes		90,501	95.87	−1.35
Informal votes		3,895	4.13	+1.35
Turnout		94,396	93.58	−1.85
Two-party-preferred result
Liberal	Greg Hunt	53,499	59.11	+0.86
Labor	Francis Gagliano-Ventura	37,002	40.89	−0.86
Liberal hold		Swing	+0.86	

=== Elections in the 2000s ===
==== 2007 ====
2007 Australian federal election: Flinders
Party	Candidate	Votes	%	±%
Liberal	Greg Hunt	48,343	54.47	−3.70
Labor	Gary March	30,073	33.88	+2.99
Greens	Bob Brown	7,529	8.48	+2.21
Family First	Cameron Eastman	1,988	2.24	+0.51
Democrats	David Batten	822	0.93	+0.07
Total formal votes		88,755	97.22	+1.56
Informal votes		2,538	2.78	−1.56
Turnout		91,293	95.49	+0.19
Two-party-preferred result
Liberal	Greg Hunt	51,697	58.25	−2.86
Labor	Gary March	37,058	41.75	+2.86
Liberal hold		Swing	−2.86	

==== 2004 ====
2004 Australian federal election: Flinders
Party	Candidate	Votes	%	±%
Liberal	Greg Hunt	48,249	58.17	+6.65
Labor	Simon Napthine	25,621	30.89	−2.05
Greens	Stuart Kingsford	5,204	6.27	+0.39
Family First	Dean Johnstone	1,435	1.73	+1.73
Independent	Paul Madigan	1,043	1.26	+1.26
Democrats	Bruce Errol	715	0.86	−4.74
Independent	Neale Adams	503	0.61	+0.61
Citizens Electoral Council	Henry Broadbent	174	0.21	+0.21
Total formal votes		82,944	95.66	−0.56
Informal votes		3,765	4.34	+0.56
Turnout		86,709	95.30	−0.32
Two-party-preferred result
Liberal	Greg Hunt	50,689	61.11	+3.67
Labor	Simon Napthine	32,255	38.89	−3.67
Liberal hold		Swing	+3.67	

==== 2001 ====
2001 Australian federal election: Flinders
Party	Candidate	Votes	%	±%
Liberal	Greg Hunt	43,601	51.71	+4.32
Labor	Wayne Finch	27,695	32.85	−4.57
Greens	David de Rango	4,886	5.79	+3.13
Democrats	Richard Armstrong	4,690	5.56	−0.82
One Nation	Kevin Dowey	1,911	2.27	−2.95
Independent	Earle Wilson	968	1.15	+1.15
Independent	Ashley Blade	567	0.67	+0.67
Total formal votes		84,318	96.23	−0.61
Informal votes		3,300	3.77	+0.61
Turnout		87,618	96.47	
Two-party-preferred result
Liberal	Greg Hunt	48,585	57.62	+3.90
Labor	Wayne Finch	35,733	42.38	−3.90
Liberal hold		Swing	+3.90	

=== Elections in the 1990s ===
==== 1998 ====
1998 Australian federal election: Flinders
Party	Candidate	Votes	%	±%
Liberal	Peter Reith	36,570	47.39	−6.31
Labor	John Armitage	28,874	37.42	+4.20
Democrats	David Allison	4,923	6.38	−1.08
One Nation	Robert Langley	4,029	5.22	+5.22
Greens	Mervyn Vogt	2,057	2.67	−1.39
Unity	Tony Kamps	451	0.58	+0.58
Natural Law	Jan Charlwood	264	0.34	−0.14
Total formal votes		77,168	96.85	−0.30
Informal votes		2,511	3.15	+0.30
Turnout		79,679	96.26	−0.14
Two-party-preferred result
Liberal	Peter Reith	41,457	53.72	−6.34
Labor	John Armitage	35,711	46.28	+6.34
Liberal hold		Swing	−6.34	

==== 1996 ====
1996 Australian federal election: Flinders
Party	Candidate	Votes	%	±%
Liberal	Peter Reith	39,503	53.70	+0.32
Labor	Ian Watkinson	24,438	33.22	−6.65
Democrats	Colin Beeforth	5,485	7.46	+3.39
Greens	Ian Ward	2,989	4.06	+4.06
Independent	Ralph Roberts	798	1.08	+1.08
Natural Law	Jan Charlwood	355	0.48	−1.68
Total formal votes		73,568	97.15	−0.40
Informal votes		2,159	2.85	+0.40
Turnout		75,727	96.40	−0.05
Two-party-preferred result
Liberal	Peter Reith	43,994	60.07	+4.36
Labor	Ian Watkinson	29,248	39.93	−4.36
Liberal hold		Swing	+4.36	

==== 1993 ====
1993 Australian federal election: Flinders
Party	Candidate	Votes	%	±%
Liberal	Peter Reith	36,735	52.96	+2.04
Labor	Denise Hassett	27,832	40.12	+5.46
Democrats	Malcolm Brown	3,167	4.57	−8.63
Natural Law	Jan Charlwood	1,636	2.36	+2.36
Total formal votes		69,370	97.60	+0.22
Informal votes		1,707	2.40	−0.22
Turnout		71,077	96.45	
Two-party-preferred result
Liberal	Peter Reith	38,271	55.19	−0.05
Labor	Denise Hassett	31,079	44.81	+0.05
Liberal hold		Swing	−0.05	

==== 1990 ====
1990 Australian federal election: Flinders
Party	Candidate	Votes	%	±%
Liberal	Peter Reith	32,853	50.9	+4.3
Labor	Tony Moore	22,363	34.7	−9.7
Democrats	Nance Jaboor	8,516	13.2	+7.8
Independent	David Gilbert	793	1.2	+1.2
Total formal votes		64,525	97.4	
Informal votes		1,739	2.6	
Turnout		66,264	96.0	
Two-party-preferred result
Liberal	Peter Reith	35,606	55.2	+4.5
Labor	Tony Moore	28,860	44.8	−4.5
Liberal hold		Swing	+4.5	

=== Elections in the 1980s ===
==== 1987 ====
1987 Australian federal election: Flinders
Party	Candidate	Votes	%	±%
Liberal	Peter Reith	31,737	47.2	+1.8
Labor	Tony Lack	29,469	43.8	−1.3
Democrats	Andrew Suttie	3,655	5.4	+1.1
Pensioner	Jonathan Miln	1,449	2.2	+1.3
Independent	Noel Maud	986	1.5	+1.5
Total formal votes		67,296	95.4	
Informal votes		3,269	4.6	
Turnout		70,565	94.5	
Two-party-preferred result
Liberal	Peter Reith	34,498	51.3	+0.1
Labor	Tony Lack	32,757	48.7	−0.1
Liberal hold		Swing	+0.1	

==== 1984 ====
1984 Australian federal election: Flinders
Party	Candidate	Votes	%	±%
Liberal	Peter Reith	25,450	45.4	+0.3
Labor	Russell Joiner	25,287	45.1	−1.4
Democrats	Murray Gill	2,389	4.3	−1.7
National	Paul van Staveren	1,780	3.2	+3.2
Democratic Labor	John McNamara	646	1.2	−1.2
Pensioner	John Miln	529	0.9	+0.9
Total formal votes		56,081	93.1	
Informal votes		4,139	6.9	
Turnout		60,220	95.2	
Two-party-preferred result
Liberal	Peter Reith	28,694	51.2	+1.5
Labor	Russell Joiner	27,379	48.8	−1.5
Liberal gain from Labor		Swing	+1.5	

==== 1983 ====
1983 Australian federal election: Flinders
Party	Candidate	Votes	%	±%
Labor	Bob Chynoweth	38,134	47.2	+8.0
Liberal	Peter Reith	35,847	44.4	−5.9
Democrats	Harold Fraser	4,861	6.0	−4.5
Democratic Labor	Kenneth Payne	1,977	2.4	+2.4
Total formal votes		80,819	98.5	
Informal votes		1,208	1.5	
Turnout		82,027	95.7	
Two-party-preferred result
Labor	Bob Chynoweth	41,206	51.0	+5.6
Liberal	Peter Reith	39,613	49.0	−5.6
Labor gain from Liberal		Swing	+5.6	

==== 1982 by-election ====
Flinders by-election, 1982
Party	Candidate	Votes	%	±%
Liberal	Peter Reith	34,765	45.7	−4.6
Labor	Rogan Ward	31,052	40.8	+1.6
Democrats	Harold Fraser	6,785	8.9	−1.6
Democratic Labor	Peter Ferwerda	1,271	1.7	+1.7
Deadly Serious	Paul Crossley	1,211	1.6	+1.6
Republican	Peter Consandine	607	0.8	+0.8
Australia	Gail Farrell	389	0.5	+0.5
Total formal votes		76,080	97.4	−0.7
Informal votes		1,991	2.6	+0.7
Turnout		78,071	92.1	−3.0
Two-party-preferred result
Liberal	Peter Reith	39,804	52.3	−2.3
Labor	Rogan Ward	36,276	47.7	+2.3
Liberal hold		Swing	−2.3	

==== 1980 ====
1980 Australian federal election: Flinders
Party	Candidate	Votes	%	±%
Liberal	Phillip Lynch	36,587	50.3	−0.2
Labor	Jean McLean	28,565	39.2	+9.4
Democrats	William Towers	7,643	10.5	−5.0
Total formal votes		72,795	98.1	
Informal votes		1,433	1.9	
Turnout		74,228	95.1	
Two-party-preferred result
Liberal	Phillip Lynch		54.6	−6.1
Labor	Jean McLean		45.4	+6.1
Liberal hold		Swing	−6.1	

=== Elections in the 1970s ===
==== 1977 ====
1977 Australian federal election: Flinders
Party	Candidate	Votes	%	±%
Liberal	Phillip Lynch	32,897	50.5	−9.4
Labor	Geoffrey Eastwood	19,401	29.8	−5.5
Democrats	Harold Fraser	10,070	15.5	+15.5
Democratic Labor	John Cass	2,089	3.2	+1.1
Independent	Monty Hollow	639	1.0	+1.0
Total formal votes		65,096	97.7	
Informal votes		1,553	2.3	
Turnout		66,649	95.7	
Two-party-preferred result
Liberal	Phillip Lynch		60.7	−1.9
Labor	Geoffrey Eastwood		39.3	+1.9
Liberal hold		Swing	−1.9	

==== 1975 ====
1975 Australian federal election: Flinders
Party	Candidate	Votes	%	±%
Liberal	Phillip Lynch	46,155	57.5	+7.2
Labor	Geoffrey Eastwood	30,251	37.7	−7.8
Australia	Peter Dalton	1,851	2.3	+0.9
Democratic Labor	John Glynn	1,654	2.1	+0.1
Independent	Stanley Hillman	375	0.5	+0.5
Total formal votes		80,286	98.5	
Informal votes		1,196	1.5	
Turnout		81,482	95.3	
Two-party-preferred result
Liberal	Phillip Lynch		60.2	+7.2
Labor	Geoffrey Eastwood		39.8	−7.2
Liberal hold		Swing	+7.2	

==== 1974 ====
1974 Australian federal election: Flinders
Party	Candidate	Votes	%	±%
Liberal	Phillip Lynch	37,148	50.3	+1.8
Labor	Colin Bednall	33,630	45.5	+0.9
Democratic Labor	John Glynn	1,383	1.9	−2.0
Australia	David Heath	1,052	1.4	−1.5
Independent	Beatrice Faust	639	0.9	+0.9
Total formal votes		73,852	98.7	
Informal votes		952	1.3	
Turnout		74,804	95.5	
Two-party-preferred result
Liberal	Phillip Lynch		53.0	+0.1
Labor	Colin Bednall		47.0	−0.1
Liberal hold		Swing	+0.1	

==== 1972 ====
1972 Australian federal election: Flinders
Party	Candidate	Votes	%	±%
Liberal	Phillip Lynch	29,640	48.5	−6.6
Labor	Colin Bednall	27,273	44.6	+10.5
Democratic Labor	John Glynn	2,380	3.9	−3.2
Australia	David Heath	1,801	2.9	+2.9
Total formal votes		61,094	98.5	
Informal votes		954	1.5	
Turnout		62,048	96.0	
Two-party-preferred result
Liberal	Phillip Lynch	32,314	52.9	−10.6
Labor	Colin Bednall	28,780	47.1	+10.6
Liberal hold		Swing	−10.6	

=== Elections in the 1960s ===
==== 1969 ====
1969 Australian federal election: Flinders
Party	Candidate	Votes	%	±%
Liberal	Phillip Lynch	27,179	55.1	+3.3
Labor	Fay Nottage	16,820	34.1	−1.6
Democratic Labor	Josephus Gobel	3,480	7.1	−2.6
Independent	Monty Hollow	1,880	3.8	+3.8
Total formal votes		49,359	97.9	
Informal votes		1,059	2.1	
Turnout		50,418	94.8	
Two-party-preferred result
Liberal	Phillip Lynch		63.5	+1.5
Labor	Fay Nottage		36.5	−1.5
Liberal hold		Swing	+1.5	

==== 1966 ====
1966 Australian federal election: Flinders
Party	Candidate	Votes	%	±%
Liberal	Phillip Lynch	31,350	49.6	−2.6
Labor	Ian Boraston	24,067	37.9	+0.2
Democratic Labor	John Cass	6,171	9.6	−0.4
Independent	George Brunning	1,787	2.8	+2.8
Total formal votes		63,555	97.1	
Informal votes		1,882	2.9	
Turnout		65,437	95.4	
Two-party-preferred result
Liberal	Phillip Lynch		59.8	−1.5
Labor	Ian Boraston		40.2	+1.5
Liberal hold		Swing	−1.5	

==== 1963 ====
1963 Australian federal election: Flinders
Party	Candidate	Votes	%	±%
Liberal	Robert Lindsay	29,723	52.2	+7.7
Labor	Nola Barber	21,464	37.7	+0.4
Democratic Labor	Martin Curry	5,781	10.1	−4.7
Total formal votes		56,968	99.0	
Informal votes		581	1.0	
Turnout		57,549	96.1	
Two-party-preferred result
Liberal	Robert Lindsay		61.3	+4.0
Labor	Nola Barber		38.7	−4.0
Liberal hold		Swing	+4.0	

==== 1961 ====
1961 Australian federal election: Flinders
Party	Candidate	Votes	%	±%
Liberal	Robert Lindsay	23,251	44.5	−6.1
Labor	Ian Cathie	19,466	37.3	−1.9
Democratic Labor	Jack Austin	7,717	14.8	+4.6
Independent	Edmund Knowles	1,796	3.4	+3.4
Total formal votes		52,230	97.7	
Informal votes		1,237	2.3	
Turnout		53,467	95.1	
Two-party-preferred result
Liberal	Robert Lindsay	29,916	57.3	−2.5
Labor	Ian Cathie	22,314	42.7	+2.5
Liberal hold		Swing	−2.5	

=== Elections in the 1950s ===
==== 1958 ====
1958 Australian federal election: Flinders
Party	Candidate	Votes	%	±%
Liberal	Robert Lindsay	23,283	50.6	−2.5
Labor	Nola Barber	18,011	39.2	+7.1
Democratic Labor	Thomas Flanagan	4,698	10.2	−4.6
Total formal votes		45,992	97.9	
Informal votes		1,009	2.1	
Turnout		47,001	95.2	
Two-party-preferred result
Liberal	Robert Lindsay		59.8	−4.3
Labor	Nola Barber		40.2	+4.3
Liberal hold		Swing	−4.3	

==== 1955 ====
1955 Australian federal election: Flinders
Party	Candidate	Votes	%	±%
Liberal	Robert Lindsay	21,515	53.1	+2.5
Labor	Francis Cranston	13,001	32.1	−17.3
Labor (A-C)	Jack Austin	6,015	14.8	+14.8
Total formal votes		40,531	97.0	
Informal votes		1,235	3.0	
Turnout		41,766	94.3	
Two-party-preferred result
Liberal	Robert Lindsay		64.1	+13.5
Labor	Francis Cranston		35.9	−13.5
Liberal hold		Swing	+13.5	

==== 1954 ====
1954 Australian federal election: Flinders
Party	Candidate	Votes	%	±%
Liberal	Robert Lindsay	24,235	51.6	−3.2
Labor	Keith Ewert	22,707	48.4	+5.4
Total formal votes		46,942	99.0	
Informal votes		494	1.0	
Turnout		47,436	96.6	
Liberal gain from Labor		Swing	−4.3	

==== 1952 by-election ====
Flinders by-election, 1952
Party	Candidate	Votes	%	±%
Labor	Keith Ewert	22,674	53.8	+10.8
Liberal	John Rossiter	18,384	43.7	−11.1
Independent	Grace Stratton	602	1.4	+1.4
Independent	Ron Hipwell	453	1.1	+1.1
Total formal votes		42,113	98.8	
Informal votes		493	1.2	
Turnout		42,606	91.1	
Two-party-preferred result
Labor	Keith Ewert		55.1	+11.0
Liberal	John Rossiter		44.9	−11.0
Labor gain from Liberal		Swing	+11.0	

==== 1951 ====
1951 Australian federal election: Flinders
Party	Candidate	Votes	%	±%
Liberal	Rupert Ryan	22,728	54.8	+0.0
Labor	Keith Ewert	17,833	43.0	+13.4
Independent	Robert Hipwell	891	2.1	+2.1
Total formal votes		41,452	98.4	
Informal votes		663	1.6	
Turnout		42,115	96.2	
Two-party-preferred result
Liberal	Rupert Ryan		55.9	−7.7
Labor	Keith Ewert		44.1	+7.7
Liberal hold		Swing	−7.7	

=== Elections in the 1940s ===
==== 1949 ====
1949 Australian federal election: Flinders
Party	Candidate	Votes	%	±%
Liberal	Rupert Ryan	21,096	54.8	+3.3
Labor	Robert Wilson	11,410	29.6	−18.9
Independent Labor	Andrew Hughes	6,018	15.6	+15.6
Total formal votes		38,524	98.7	
Informal votes		490	1.3	
Turnout		39,014	94.3	
Two-party-preferred result
Liberal	Rupert Ryan		63.6	+12.1
Labor	Robert Wilson		36.4	−12.1
Liberal hold		Swing	+12.1	

==== 1946 ====
1946 Australian federal election: Flinders
Party	Candidate	Votes	%	±%
Liberal	Rupert Ryan	36,615	54.4	+17.6
Labor	Frank Lee	30,698	45.6	+6.0
Total formal votes		67,313	98.4	
Informal votes		1,087	1.6	
Turnout		68,400	93.5	
Liberal hold		Swing	+2.6	

==== 1943 ====
1943 Australian federal election: Flinders
Party	Candidate	Votes	%	±%
Labor	Frank Lee	24,132	39.6	+11.9
United Australia	Rupert Ryan	22,395	36.8	−2.9
Country	Morton Moyes	6,867	11.3	+11.3
Women	Mabel Brookes	5,305	8.7	+8.7
Independent	Rupert Clark	2,198	3.6	+3.6
Total formal votes		60,897	97.1	
Informal votes		1,817	2.9	
Turnout		62,714	95.2	
Two-party-preferred result
United Australia	Rupert Ryan	31,518	51.8	−6.6
Labor	Frank Lee	29,379	48.2	+6.6
United Australia hold		Swing	−6.6	

==== 1940 ====
1940 Australian federal election: Flinders
Party	Candidate	Votes	%	±%
United Australia	Rupert Ryan	22,154	39.7	−13.3
Labor	Frank Lee	15,465	27.7	+27.7
Independent	Edward Mann	14,920	26.7	+26.7
Independent	Alexander Amess	3,245	5.8	+5.8
Total formal votes		55,784	98.3	
Informal votes		946	1.7	
Turnout		56,730	95.9	
Two-party-preferred result
United Australia	Rupert Ryan	32,591	58.4	−3.3
Labor	Frank Lee	23,193	41.6	+3.3
United Australia hold		Swing	−3.3	

=== Elections in the 1930s ===
==== 1937 ====
1937 Australian federal election: Flinders
Party	Candidate	Votes	%	±%
United Australia	James Fairbairn	27,085	53.0	−7.9
Country	Reginald Skeat	12,497	24.5	−15.9
Social Credit	Alexander Amess	6,884	13.5	+13.5
Communist	Ralph Gibson	4,630	9.1	+2.1
Total formal votes		51,096	96.8	
Informal votes		1,709	3.2	
Turnout		52,805	96.5	
Two-party-preferred result
United Australia	James Fairbairn		61.7	−9.6
Country	Reginald Skeat		38.3	+38.3
United Australia hold		Swing	−9.6	

==== 1934 ====
1934 Australian federal election: Flinders
Party	Candidate	Votes	%	±%
United Australia	James Fairbairn	41,565	60.9	−7.4
Labor	Joseph Hannan	16,061	23.5	−8.2
Country	William Fullerton	5,860	8.6	+8.6
Communist	Ralph Gibson	4,750	7.0	+7.0
Total formal votes		68,236	96.7	
Informal votes		2,343	3.3	
Turnout		70,579	95.6	
Two-party-preferred result
United Australia	James Fairbairn		69.4	+1.1
Labor	Joseph Hannan		30.6	−1.1
United Australia hold		Swing	+1.1	

==== 1933 by-election ====
Flinders by-election, 1933
Party	Candidate	Votes	%	±%
United Australia	James Fairbairn	36,773	59.0	−9.3
Labor	Arthur Haywood	22,454	36.0	+4.3
Communist	Ralph Gibson	3,124	5.0	+5.0
Total formal votes		62,351	97.3	
Informal votes		1,747	2.7	
Turnout		64,098	89.2	
Two-party-preferred result
United Australia	James Fairbairn		59.5	−8.8
Labor	Arthur Haywood		40.5	+8.8
United Australia hold		Swing	−8.8	

==== 1931 ====
1931 Australian federal election: Flinders
Party	Candidate	Votes	%	±%
United Australia	Stanley Bruce	45,304	68.3	+20.2
Labor	Arthur Haywood	21,004	31.7	−16.5
Total formal votes		66,308	97.9	
Informal votes		1,418	2.1	
Turnout		67,726	95.7	
United Australia gain from Labor		Swing	+18.5	

=== Elections in the 1920s ===
==== 1929 ====
1929 Australian federal election: Flinders
Party	Candidate	Votes	%	±%
Labor	Jack Holloway	30,114	48.2	+10.0
Nationalist	Stanley Bruce	30,054	48.1	−11.3
Independent Liberal	Joseph Burch	2,267	3.6	+3.6
Total formal votes		62,435	98.6	
Informal votes		903	1.4	
Turnout		63,338	96.2	
Two-party-preferred result
Labor	Jack Holloway	31,370	50.2	+10.9
Nationalist	Stanley Bruce	31,065	49.8	−10.9
Labor gain from Nationalist		Swing	+10.9	

==== 1928 ====
1928 Australian federal election: Flinders
Party	Candidate	Votes	%	±%
Nationalist	Stanley Bruce	34,823	59.4	−3.3
Labor	Jack Holloway	22,372	38.2	+0.9
Ind. Nationalist	Clarence Robertson	1,447	2.5	+2.5
Total formal votes		58,642	96.6	
Informal votes		2,073	3.4	
Turnout		60,715	95.0	
Two-party-preferred result
Nationalist	Stanley Bruce		60.7	−1.9
Labor	Jack Holloway		39.3	+1.9
Nationalist hold		Swing	−1.9	

==== 1925 ====
1925 Australian federal election: Flinders
Party	Candidate	Votes	%	±%
Nationalist	Stanley Bruce	33,173	62.7	+7.1
Labor	Roy Beardsworth	19,173	37.3	+37.3
Total formal votes		52,921	98.4	
Informal votes		868	1.6	
Turnout		53,789	93.4	
Nationalist hold		Swing	+7.1	

==== 1922 ====
1922 Australian federal election: Flinders
Party	Candidate	Votes	%	±%
Nationalist	Stanley Bruce	10,689	55.6	+4.5
Liberal	Stephen Thompson	8,532	44.4	+44.4
Total formal votes		19,221	95.9	
Informal votes		832	4.1	
Turnout		20,053	43.6	
Nationalist hold		Swing	−15.1	

=== Elections in the 1910s ===
==== 1919 ====
1919 Australian federal election: Flinders
Party	Candidate	Votes	%	±%
Nationalist	Stanley Bruce	12,968	48.0	−13.2
Labor	Frederick Riley	7,926	29.3	−9.5
Victorian Farmers	William Burrage	6,126	22.7	+22.7
Total formal votes		27,020	94.0	
Informal votes		1,713	6.0	
Turnout		28,733	70.1	
Two-party-preferred result
Nationalist	Stanley Bruce	17,693	65.5	+4.3
Labor	Frederick Riley	9,327	34.5	−4.3
Nationalist hold		Swing	+4.3	

==== 1918 by-election ====
Flinders by-election, 1918
Party	Candidate	Votes	%	±%
Nationalist	Stanley Bruce	14,445	64.0	+2.8
Labor	Gordon Holmes	7,740	34.3	−4.5
Victorian Farmers	John Hall	382	1.7	+1.7
Total formal votes		22,567	99.1	
Informal votes		203	0.9	
Turnout		22,770	56.6	
Nationalist hold		Swing	+3.7	

==== 1917 ====
1917 Australian federal election: Flinders
Party	Candidate	Votes	%	±%
Nationalist	Sir William Irvine	19,398	61.2	+8.5
Labor	David Russell	12,322	38.8	−8.5
Total formal votes		31,720	97.7	
Informal votes		762	2.3	
Turnout		32,482	80.3	
Nationalist hold		Swing	+8.5	

==== 1914 ====
1914 Australian federal election: Flinders
Party	Candidate	Votes	%	±%
Liberal	Sir William Irvine	14,956	52.7	−5.1
Labor	John McDougall	13,448	47.3	+5.1
Total formal votes		28,404	97.8	
Informal votes		629	2.2	
Turnout		29,033	77.6	
Liberal hold		Swing	−5.1	

==== 1913 ====
1913 Australian federal election: Flinders
Party	Candidate	Votes	%	±%
Liberal	William Irvine	15,640	57.8	+11.5
Labor	David Russell	11,418	42.2	+8.4
Total formal votes		27,058	97.4	
Informal votes		714	2.6	
Turnout		27,772	73.1	
Liberal hold		Swing	+1.5	

==== 1910 ====
1910 Australian federal election: Flinders
Party	Candidate	Votes	%	±%
Liberal	William Irvine	8,258	47.9	−52.1
Labour	Frank Buckley	5,490	31.8	+31.8
Independent Liberal	Timothy McInerney	3,491	20.3	+20.3
Total formal votes		17,239	96.7	
Informal votes		587	3.3	
Turnout		17,826	58.1	
Liberal hold		Swing	−52.1	

=== Elections in the 1900s ===
==== 1906 ====
1906 Australian federal election: Flinders
Party	Candidate	Votes	%	±%
Anti-Socialist	William Irvine	7,621	51.5	+15.2
Protectionist	Arthur Nichols	7,184	48.5	+21.2
Total formal votes		14,805	95.7	
Informal votes		659	4.3	
Turnout		15,464	54.3	
Anti-Socialist hold		Swing	−3.0	

==== 1903 ====
1903 Australian federal election: Flinders
Party	Candidate	Votes	%	±%
Free Trade	James Gibb	5,194	36.3	−3.6
Protectionist	Arthur Nichols	3,917	27.3	−6.7
Labour	Arthur Wilson	2,971	20.7	+20.7
Ind. Protectionist	Louis Smith	2,242	15.7	+15.7
Total formal votes		14,324	98.8	
Informal votes		177	1.2	
Turnout		14,501	52.8	
Free Trade hold		Swing	+1.5	

==== 1901 ====
1901 Australian federal election: Flinders
Party	Candidate	Votes	%	±%
Free Trade	Arthur Groom	2,272	39.9	+39.9
Protectionist	Louis Smith	1,939	34.0	+34.0
Ind. Protectionist	Alfred Downward	1,489	26.1	+26.1
Total formal votes		5,700	99.3	
Informal votes		42	0.7	
Turnout		5,742	47.2	
Free Trade win		(new seat)		
