= Moyes Islands =

Islands in George V Land, Antarctica

- Location within Antarctica

Geography
- Location: Antarctica
- Coordinates: 67°1′S 143°51′E

Administration
- Administered under the Antarctic Treaty System

Demographics
- Population: Uninhabited

Moyes Islands is a group of small islands lying in the west part of Watt Bay, 4.6 kilometres (2.5 nmi) southeast of Cape-Pigeon Rocks. Discovered by the Australasian Antarctic Expedition (1911–14) under Douglas Mawson, who named them for Morton H. Moyes who served as meteorologist with the expedition.

== See also ==
- List of Antarctic and sub-Antarctic islands
