= Stillwell Island =

Island in Antarctica

- Location within Antarctica

Geography
- Location: Antarctica
- Coordinates: 66°55′S 143°48′E

Administration
- Administered under the Antarctic Treaty System

Demographics
- Population: Uninhabited

Stillwell Island is a small, steep rocky island, 0.5 km (0.25 nmi) in diameter, which is the largest member of the Way Archipelago. It lies at the west side of the entrance to Watt Bay, 2.8 km (1.5 nmi) northeast of Garnet Point. Discovered by the Australasian Antarctic Expedition (1911–14) under Douglas Mawson. He named it for Frank L. Stillwell, geologist with the expedition whose detailed survey included this coastal area.

== See also ==
- List of Antarctic and sub-Antarctic islands
