= Way Archipelago =

Islands of Antarctica

Coordinates: 66°54′25″S 143°52′05″E

Location in Antarctica

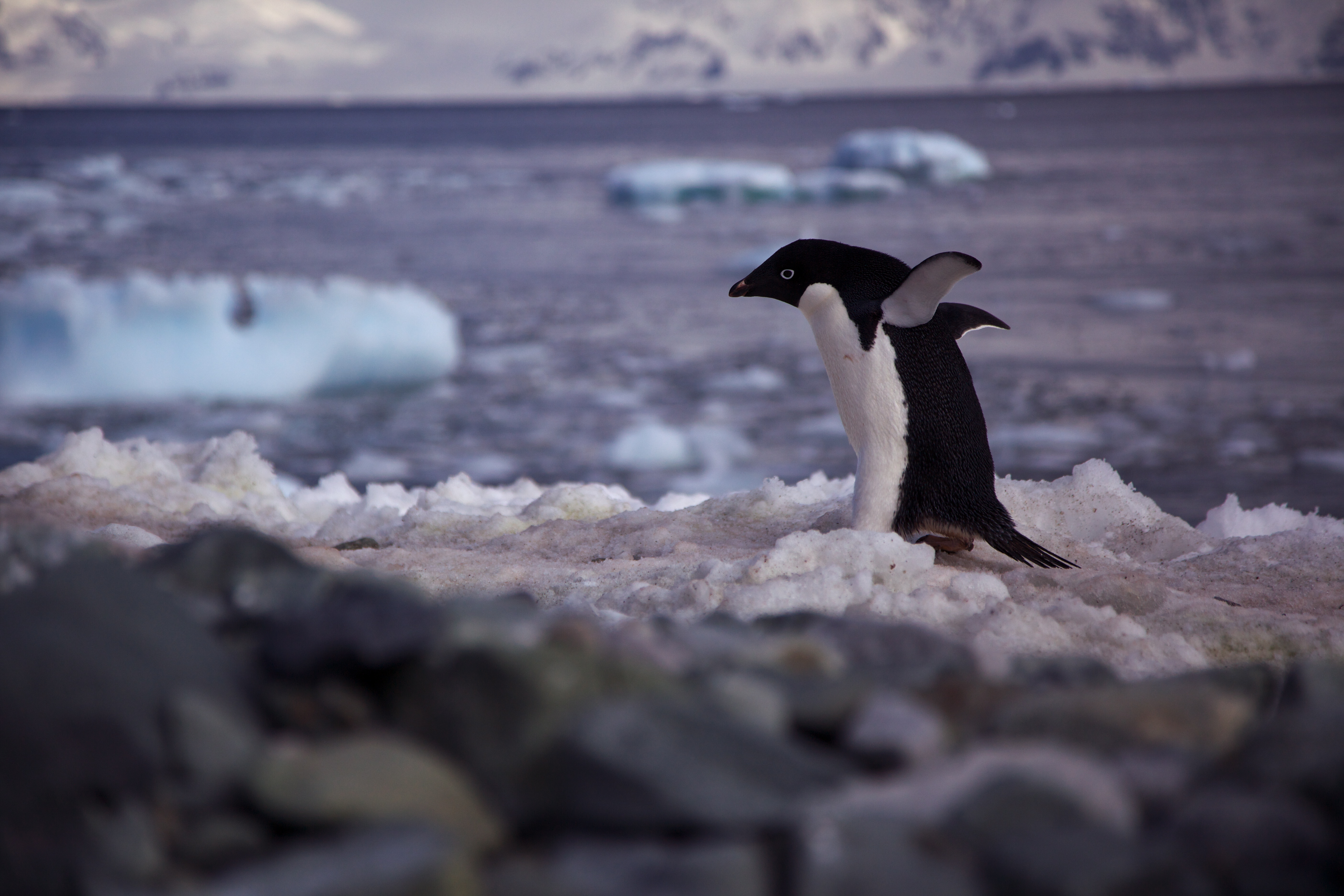
Adélie penguins breed in the IBA

The Way Archipelago encompasses more than 120 small islands and rocks, of which the largest is Stillwell Island, distributed close offshore in the form of an arc. The archipelago extends from the vicinity of Cape Gray, at the eastern side of the entrance to Commonwealth Bay, to the vicinity of Garnet Point at the western side of the entrance to Watt Bay, in George V Land, Antarctica. Most of the islands are relatively snow-free, even in winter, because of the strong katabatic winds that characterise the weather in the region. Stillwell Island and Garnet Point exhibit large garnet crystals in the metamorphic gneiss rocks that dominate the local geology.

== Discovery and naming ==
The archipelago was discovered by the Australasian Antarctic Expedition (1911–14) under Douglas Mawson, who named the group for Sir Samuel Way, Chancellor of the University of Adelaide, in 1911.

== Important Bird Area ==
A 3,247 ha site, comprising the whole archipelago, has been designated an Important Bird Area (IBA) by BirdLife International because it supports breeding colonies totalling some 52,000 pairs of Adélie penguins, estimated from 2011 satellite imagery. About 4,000 pairs of southern fulmars also breed in the region.
