= Cape-Pigeon Rocks =

Headland of Antarctica

Coordinates: 66°59′S 143°47′E

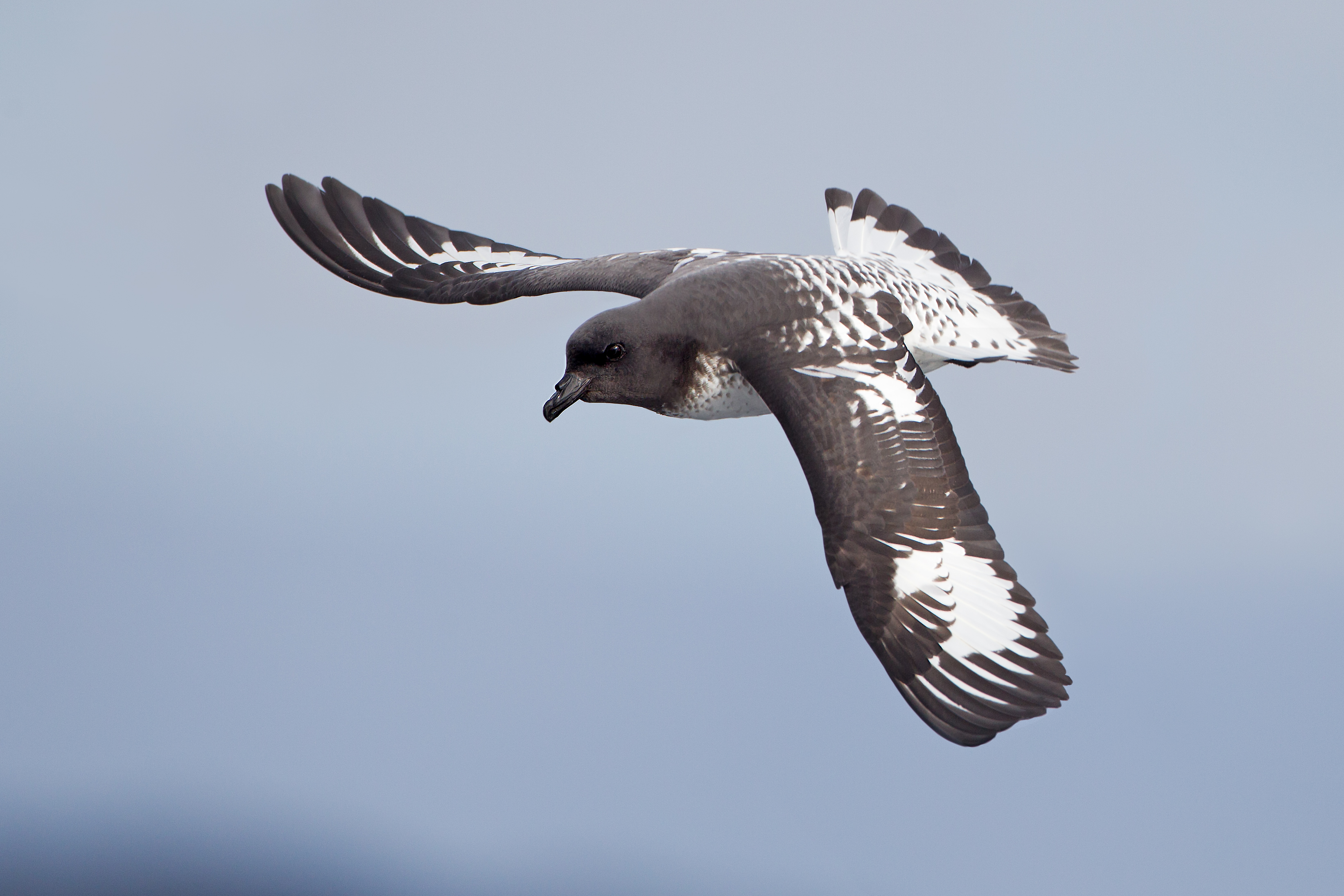
The site was named for the Cape petrels that formerly bred here

The Cape-Pigeon Rocks are twin rocky promontories on the western side of Watt Bay, 6 kilometres (3 nmi) south of Garnet Point. They were discovered by the Australasian Antarctic Expedition (1911–14) under Douglas Mawson, who gave the name because of the large rookery of Cape petrels (also known as Cape pigeons) here. The Advisory Committee on Antarctic Names added a hyphen between the first and second words in the specific part of the name to reduce ambiguity and emphasize the generic term "Rocks".

== Important Bird Area ==
A 127 ha site comprising the ice-free ground of Cape Pigeon Rocks, along with a small ice-free island to the east and the intervening sea ice, has been designated an Important Bird Area (IBA) by BirdLife International because it supports a colony of about 10,000 breeding pairs of Adélie penguins (estimated from 2011 satellite imagery).
