= Colin Bednall =

Australian journalist

Colin Bednall OBE
- Born: 13 January 1913; Balaklava, South Australia
- Died: 26 April 1976 (aged 63); Portsea, Victoria

Colin Blore Bednall OBE (13 January 1913 – 26 April 1976) was an Australian journalist.

He was born at Balaklava, South Australia, to bank manager Edward Blore Bednall and Naomi Caroline Gertrude, née Ferry. He attended Pulteney Grammar School and the Collegiate School of St Peter, but left during the Great Depression following the death of his father. He became a journalist at the Adelaide News and then at the Sun and the Herald. From 1937 to 1938 he was a special correspondent in Darwin, where he met Hilda Marion Abbott, daughter of administrator Aubrey Abbott, whom he married on 4 February 1939 in Radlett, Hertfordshire.

From 1938 Bednall worked for Australian Associated Press in London, and from 1942 to 1944 was aviation correspondent for the Daily Mail. His articles were informed by his flights as a qualified gunner over Germany. In 1945 he worked briefly as a correspondent for Lord Louis Mountbatten's command in India, and was appointed Officer of the Order of the British Empire for his services to the war effort. Although he was an assistant editor at the Daily Mail, he was persuaded to return to Australia by his mentor, Keith Murdoch, who made him managing editor of Queensland Newspapers Pty Ltd, and therefore the Courier-Mail. In 1954 he succeeded Murdoch as managing editor of the Argus in Melbourne.

Bednall was the first managing director of GTV 9, one of Melbourne's first two commercial television stations; this became the local station for Channel Nine, and Bednall cultivated a number of local television personalities, including Graham Kennedy. In 1965, he left the channel after a disagreement over finances. He was then appointed to UNESCO's space communications committee, and from 1966 to 1969 he managed an English-Chinese television station TVB in Hong Kong. His time in China saw his previously conservative political views shift to the left, and when he returned to Australia he joined the Labor Party, and ran unsuccessfully for the seat of Flinders in the federal elections of 1972 and 1974. From 1973 to 1975, he also worked as a part-time media consultant for Gough Whitlam. In 1976 he died suddenly of hypertensive heart disease at the age of 63. He is commemorated with the Colin Bednall Award, presented annually for services to television.
