= 1952 Flinders by-election =

A by-election was held for the Australian House of Representatives seat of Flinders on 18 October 1952. This was triggered by the death of Liberal MP Rupert Ryan.

The by-election was won by Labor candidate Keith Ewert.

== Results ==
Flinders by-election, 1952
Party	Candidate	Votes	%	±%
Labor	Keith Ewert	22,674	53.8	+10.8
Liberal	John Rossiter	18,384	43.7	−11.1
Independent	Grace Stratton	602	1.4	+1.4
Independent	Ron Hipwell	453	1.1	+1.1
Total formal votes		42,113	98.8	
Informal votes		493	1.2	
Turnout		42,606	91.1	
Two-party-preferred result
Labor	Keith Ewert		55.1	+11.0
Liberal	John Rossiter		44.9	−11.0
Labor gain from Liberal		Swing	+11.0	
