= Morton Moyes =

Morton Moyes OBE FRGS
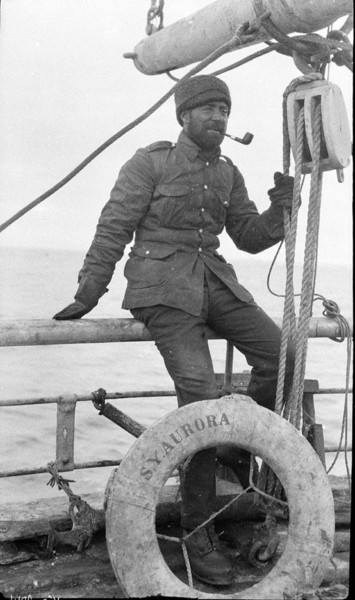
- Moyes in 1911
- Born: Morton Henry Moyes; 29 June 1886; Koolunga, South Australia
- Died: 20 September 1981 (aged 95); Sydney
- Military career
- Branch: Royal Australian Navy
- Service years: 1914–1951
- Rank: Captain
- Wars: World War I, World War II
- Awards: Polar Medal

Morton Henry Moyes OBE FRGS (29 June 1886 – 20 September 1981) was an Australian Antarctic explorer and naval officer.

Moyes was born in Koolunga to headmaster John Moyes and Ellen Jane, née Stoward. Two of his brothers were John Stoward Moyes, who became an Anglican bishop, and Alban George (Johnnie) Moyes, a first class cricketer and journalist. Morton attended the Collegiate School of St Peter in Adelaide and graduated with a Bachelor of Science in physics and mathematics from the University of Adelaide in 1910, having represented South Australia in athletic championships. His geology lecturer, Douglas Mawson, had a profound impact on him and he successfully applied to join Mawson's Australasian Antarctic expedition in 1911 as meteorologist for Frank Wild's western base. In November 1912, Wild's group left on a sledging trip with Moyes remaining at the hut; the trip ended up taking nine weeks when the sled was lost.

Moyes returned to Australia in March 1913 as headmaster of University Coaching College in Sydney. In February 1914 he was recruited as naval instructor for the new Royal Australian Naval College, moving from mathematics to navigation in 1915. In January 1916 he was promoted senior naval instructor and was navigating officer of Captain John King Davis's ship the Aurora on its December rescue mission for members of Ernest Shackleton's Imperial Trans-Antarctic Expedition.

Moyes twice attempted to leave the naval college to enlist but was refused; in October 1918, when his resignation was finally accepted, the war was all but over. He married Miriam Esther King at St James' Church in Sydney on 11 January 1919. Moyes returned to the navy as an instructor lieutenant with seniority; he was promoted instructor lieutenant-commander in 1920 and commander in 1924.

Mawson requested Moyes for the British Australian and New Zealand Antarctic Research Expedition in September 1929, although Davis felt he lacked the training for a ship's officer and he became survey officer. Moyes did not undertake the second expedition in November 1930 but instead returned to the navy. He was fleet instructor officer aboard HMAS Australia for six years before becoming the navy's first (acting) instructor captain in June 1941. He was the first director of educational and vocational training at Navy College, Melbourne, being appointed in November 1943 (his age and seniority precluded him from undertaking active sea service). He left the navy in 1946 and became chief rehabilitation officer for the Commonwealth, retiring in 1951.

Moyes, who was president of the Geographical Society of New South Wales from 1933 to 1935, was appointed Officer of the Order of the British Empire in 1935 and in his retirement published memoirs of his Antarctic travels. He died in Sydney in 1981 and was cremated at Roseville. Several Antarctic geographical features, including Moyes Peak and the Moyes Islands, are named for him.
