= Robert Lindsay (Australian politician) =

Australian politician

Robert Lindsay OBE
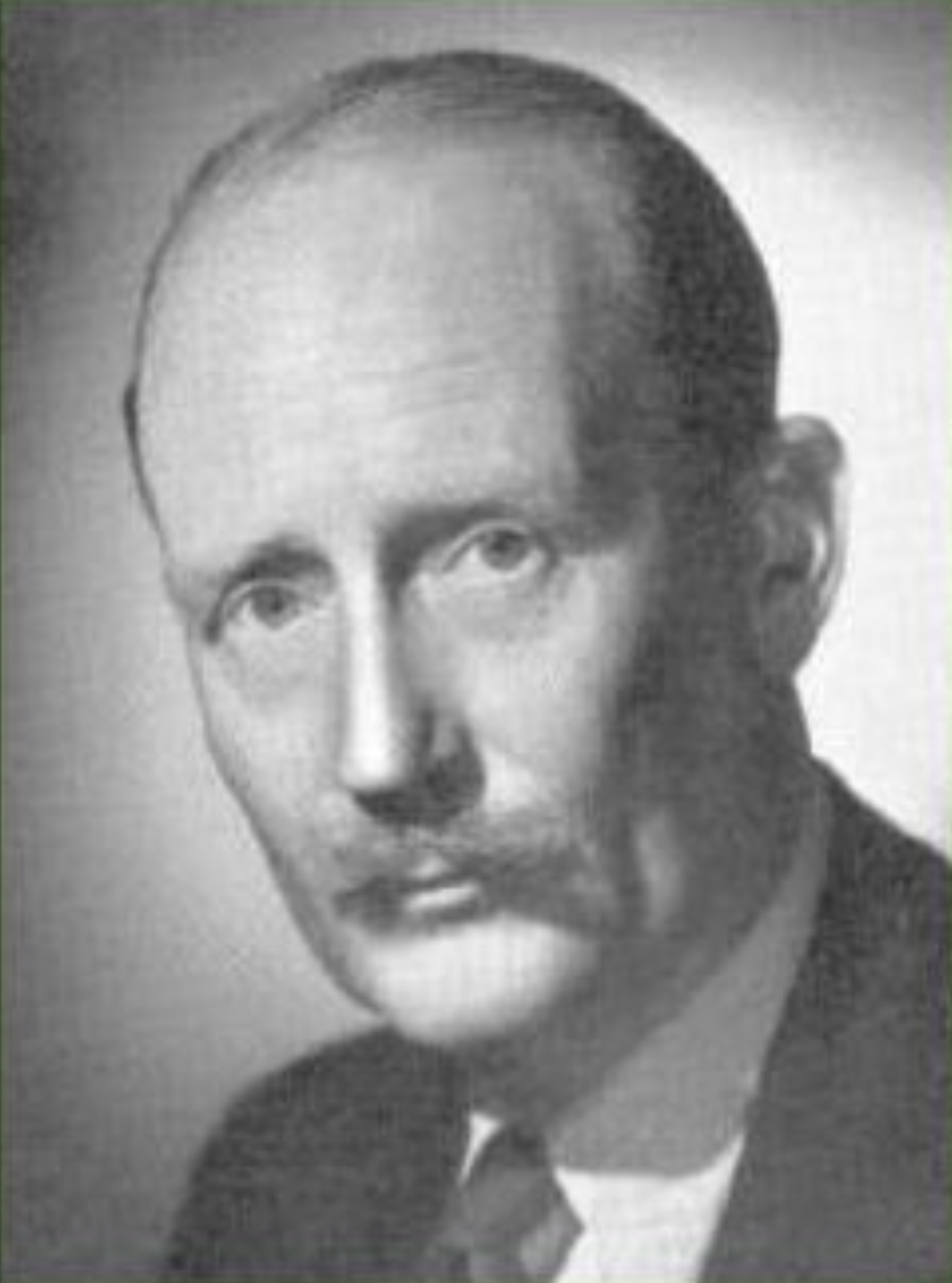

Member of the Australian Parliament for Flinders
- In office 29 May 1954 – 31 October 1966
- Preceded by: Keith Ewert
- Succeeded by: Phillip Lynch

Personal details
- Born: 18 August 1905 Norwich, UK
- Died: 6 September 2000 (aged 95) Victoria, Australia
- Party: Liberal Party of Australia
- Occupation: Grenadier Guard & Australian politician

Robert William Ludovic Lindsay OBE (18 August 1905 – 6 September 2000) was an English-born Australian politician. From Norwich, England, was educated at Eton College and then Royal Military College, Sandhurst.

An officer of the British Grenadier Guards, he spoke fluent Arabic, and was seconded to the Transjordan Frontier Force in 1930, serving in the Middle East for about four years. He retired from the military in 1937, with the rank of captain. Recalled to service during World War II, he served with the Grenadier Guards in Europe and the Middle East, attaining the rank of brevet major.

His mother was Australian and he migrated following the war. In 1954, was elected to the Australian House of Representatives as the Liberal member for the Flinders, defeating Labor's Keith Ewert. He held the seat until his retirement in 1966.

Lindsay was made a member of the Order of the British Empire in 1971. He died in 2000.

Parliament of Australia
Preceded by Keith Ewert	Member for Flinders; 1954–1966	Succeeded by Phillip Lynch
