= Zoe McKenzie =

Australian politician

Zoe McKenzie MP
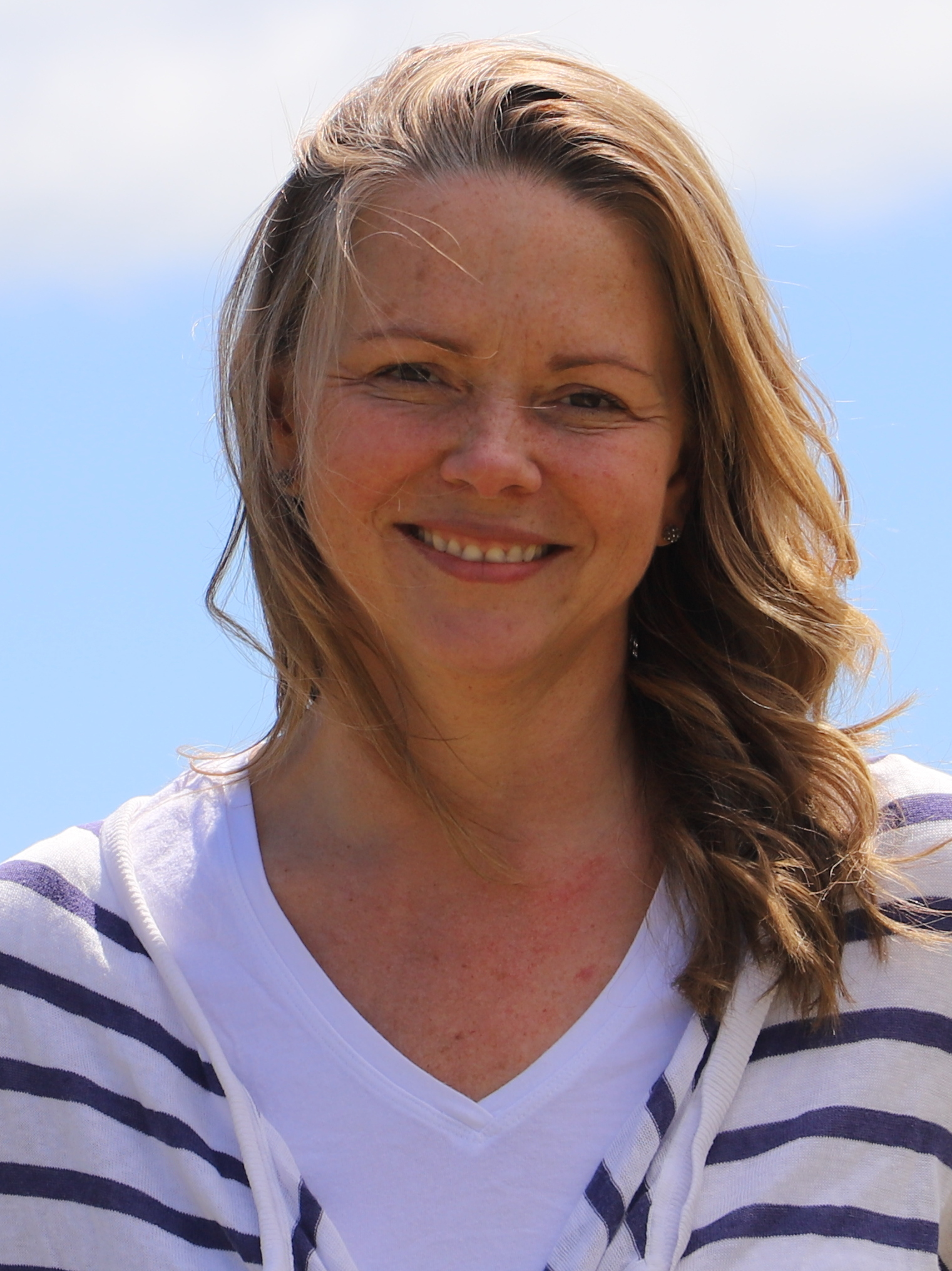
- McKenzie in 2025

Member of the House of Representatives for Flinders
- Incumbent
- Assumed office 21 May 2022
- Preceded by: Greg Hunt

Personal details
- Born: Zoe McKenzie; 2 October 1972 (age 53) Melbourne, Victoria
- Party: Liberal
- Other political affiliations: Liberal–National Coalition
- Occupation: Lawyer
- Website: Official website

Zoe McKenzie (born 2 October 1972) is an Australian Liberal politician who has served in the House of Representatives since May 2022, representing the Division of Flinders in Victoria. McKenzie was an industrial relations lawyer, international trade specialist and board director prior to election to the Parliament of Australia on 21 May 2022.

== Early life ==
=== Family background ===
McKenzie was born in Melbourne Australia, educated at Lauriston Girls School in Armadale and attended the University of Melbourne, where she undertook Law and Arts, focusing on French, German and Spanish language studies in her arts degree.

McKenzie was raised by her mother, Ann Shanahan, who practised as a cardio-thoracic surgeon and lawyer, through most of her professional life.

At the age of 15, Zoe undertook an exchange to France, attending school and living with a French family in a small village near Valence.

At University, she worked as a research assistant to Professor Greg Craven and Professor Cheryl Saunders, at the Centre for Comparative Constitutional Studies and as a part-time junior adviser to Attorney General Jan Wade, in the Kennett Government.

=== Career ===
McKenzie undertook articles with Corrs Chambers Westgarth and practised in industrial relations law before joining the private office of Federal Attorney General Daryl Williams AM QC, with responsibility for constitutional law, criminal justice and reform of the marriage celebrant scheme.

McKenzie then joined Freehill Hollingdale and Page (later Freehills, now Herbert Smith Freehills) in industrial relations and employment law becoming a Senior Associate with the firm in 2003.

In 2004 she returned to policy work, first becoming an adviser to federal Education, Science and Training Minister Brendan Nelson, with responsibility for vocational education, and later higher education, then working in senior policy and chief of staff roles in the Communications and Arts portfolio.

Upon its election in late 2010, McKenzie worked as a political staffer for the Baillieu Coalition Government with responsibility for education and culture policy issues, before returning to Federal Government on the election of Tony Abbott in 2013, as Chief of Staff to the Minister for Trade and Investment, Andrew Robb.

McKenzie joined the board of the Australia Council for the Arts in 2016, and the NBN Ltd in 2018, resigning from these roles in late 2021 to contest pre-selection for the seat of Flinders. She has also sat on the Committee for Mornington Peninsula.

== Political career ==
McKenzie replaced Greg Hunt as the Liberal candidate for Flinders in 2021 and was elected to the House of Representatives at the 2022 federal election, standing in the Division of Flinders. McKenzie was successful, with a slight two-party preferred swing in her favour.

McKenzie visited Israel on a bipartisan parliamentary delegation in December 2023.

== Personal life ==
McKenzie was in a relationship with Rodrigo Pintos-Lopez from 2013. They became engaged in 2019 but separated in 2024. She lives in Sorrento in Victoria.

Parliament of Australia
Preceded by Greg Hunt	Member for Flinders; 2022–present	Incumbent
