= Keith Ewert =

Australian politician

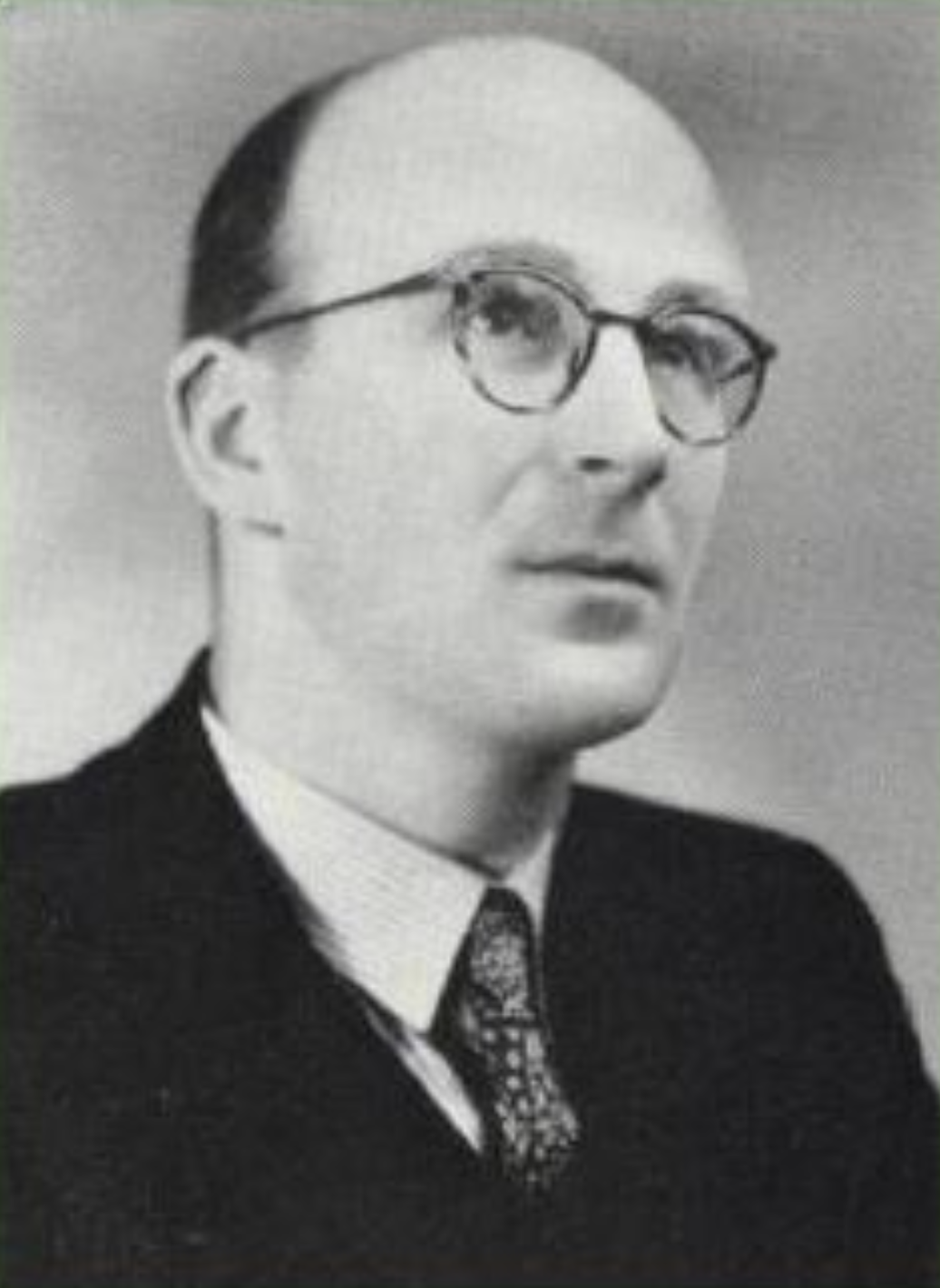

Member of the Australian Parliament for Flinders
- In office 18 October 1952 – 29 May 1954
- Preceded by: Rupert Ryan
- Succeeded by: Robert Lindsay

Personal details
- Born: 12 April 1918 Brighton, Victoria, Australia
- Died: 2 December 1989 (aged 71)
- Party: Australian Labor Party
- Education: University of Melbourne
- Occupation: Accountant

Keith Walter Wilson Ewert (12 April 1918 – 2 December 1989) was an Australian politician. Born in Brighton and educated at Melbourne High School and the University of Melbourne, he was an accountant before entering politics. In 1952, Ewert was elected to the Australian House of Representatives as the Labor member for Flinders, unexpectedly winning the by-election for that seat caused by the death of Rupert Ryan, becoming only the second Labor MP for Flinders. In 1954, he was defeated by Liberal Robert Lindsay.

In 1955, 1958 and 1961, Ewert was the Labor candidate for the nearby seat of Bruce, losing each time to Liberal Billy Snedden. On the third attempt, Ewert actually led in the first count, but was defeated by DLP preferences.

After his final defeat, Ewert resumed his accountancy practice. He died in 1989.

Parliament of Australia
Preceded by Rupert Ryan	Member for Flinders; 1952–1954	Succeeded by Robert Lindsay
