= Phillip Lynch =

Australian politician

The Right Honourable Sir Phillip Lynch KCMG
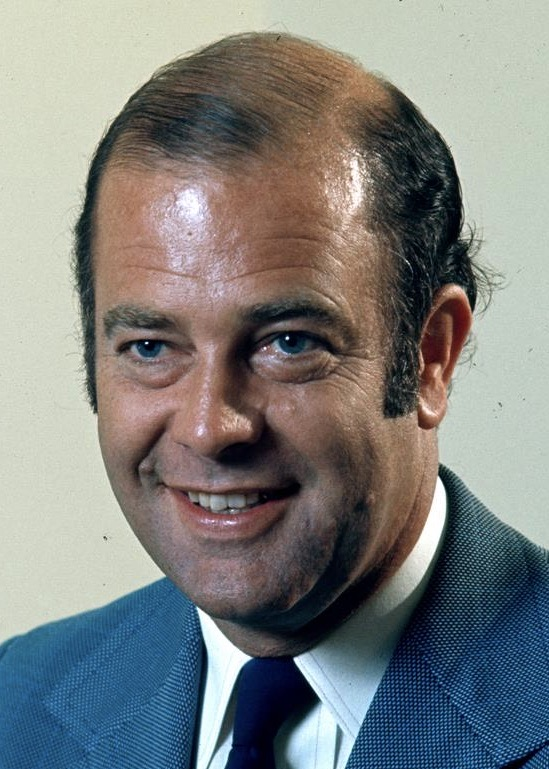
- Lynch in 1975

Deputy Leader of the Liberal Party
- In office 20 December 1972 – 8 April 1982
- Leader: Billy Snedden; Malcolm Fraser
- Preceded by: Billy Snedden
- Succeeded by: John Howard

Treasurer of Australia
- In office 11 November 1975 – 19 November 1977
- Prime Minister: Malcolm Fraser
- Preceded by: Bill Hayden
- Succeeded by: John Howard

Minister for Industry and Commerce
- In office 20 December 1977 – 11 October 1982
- Prime Minister: Malcolm Fraser
- Preceded by: Bob Cotton
- Succeeded by: Andrew Peacock

Minister for Finance
- In office 7 December 1976 – 19 November 1977
- Prime Minister: Malcolm Fraser
- Preceded by: Position Established
- Succeeded by: Eric Robinson

Minister for Labour and National Service
- In office 22 March 1971 – 5 December 1972
- Prime Minister: William McMahon
- Preceded by: Billy Snedden
- Succeeded by: Lance Barnard

Minister for Immigration
- In office 12 November 1969 – 22 March 1971
- Prime Minister: John Gorton; William McMahon
- Preceded by: Billy Snedden
- Succeeded by: Jim Forbes

Minister for the Army
- In office 28 February 1968 – 12 November 1969
- Prime Minister: John Gorton
- Preceded by: Malcolm Fraser
- Succeeded by: Andrew Peacock

Member of the Australian Parliament for Flinders
- In office 26 November 1966 – 22 October 1982
- Preceded by: Robert Lindsay
- Succeeded by: Peter Reith

Personal details
- Born: 27 July 1933 Carlton, Victoria, Australia
- Died: 19 June 1984 (aged 50) Frankston, Victoria, Australia
- Party: Liberal
- Spouse: Leah O'Toole (m. 1958)

Sir Phillip Reginald Lynch KCMG (27 July 1933 – 19 June 1984) was an Australian politician who served in the House of Representatives from 1966 to 1982. He was deputy leader of the Liberal Party from 1972 to 1982, and served as a government minister under three prime ministers.

Lynch was born in Melbourne and worked as a school teacher and management consultant before entering politics. He was elected to parliament at the 1966 federal election. Lynch was appointed to cabinet at the age of 34, and served as Minister for the Army (1968–1969), Minister for Immigration (1969–1971), and Minister for Labour and National Service (1971–1972) under John Gorton and William McMahon. He was elected deputy leader of the Liberal Party in 1972, serving first under Billy Snedden and later under Malcolm Fraser. Lynch became Treasurer when the Liberals returned to power in 1975, but had to resign after evidence at a judicial inquiry in Victoria by Sir Gregory Gowans linked him to land speculation in Victoria. He was then Minister for Industry and Commerce until his retirement due to ill health in 1982. He died of cancer a few years later, aged 50. He was buried at Frankston Cemetery in Melbourne, Victoria.

== Early life ==
Lynch was born in Carlton, Melbourne, Victoria, the oldest child of Dorothy Louise (née Reilly) and Reginald Thomas Lynch. His father was a fitter. Lynch grew up in the suburb of Kew and attended Catholic schools, initially a Marist Brothers school in Hawthorn and then Xavier College. He went on to study at the University of Melbourne, graduating with a Bachelor of Arts in 1955 and a diploma in education in 1964. He was active in student politics, and campaigned against the White Australia policy. After graduating, Lynch worked as a schoolteacher for about a year, mostly at Collingwood Technical School. He then joined Manpower (Australia) Pty Ltd, a management consulting firm of which he eventually became managing director. He married Leah Brigid O'Toole in 1958, with whom he had three sons.

=== Community ===
Lynch joined the Junior Chamber of Commerce in 1959; he became the Melbourne vice-president (1962) and president (1963), and then national president (1964).

He has a foundation member of the Frankston Rostrum Club 41 in 1967 and was a sought after speaker at their events.

== Early years in politics ==
As a university student, Lynch considered joining the Australian Labor Party, but was alienated by the party's left wing. His decision to join the Liberal Party was unusual for someone from a working-class Catholic background, and throughout his career he was one of the party's few Catholic MPs. Lynch first stood for parliament at the 1955 federal election, aged 22, running in the safe Labor seat of Scullin. He was state president of the Young Liberals from 1956 to 1958, and served on the party's state executive from 1956 to 1963. Lynch was eventually elected to the House of Representatives at the 1966 election. He won Liberal preselection for the Division of Flinders against a large field of other candidates.

== Government minister ==
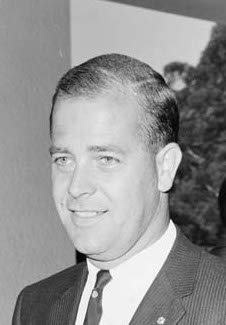
Lynch in 1968.

Between 1968 and 1972, Lynch served variously as Minister for the Army, Minister for Immigration, and Minister for Labour and National Service, under Prime Ministers John Gorton and William McMahon. In opposition from 1972 to 1975, he was Deputy Leader of the Liberal Party. He was also the Deputy Leader of the Opposition as then Liberal leader Billy Snedden had refused to give the title to the Country Party leader Doug Anthony. After his party won back government in 1975, Lynch continued as Deputy Leader of the Liberal Party until his retirement in 1982.

Opposed to the “white Australia policy” and Australia's restrictive immigration regime, as minister for immigration in 1970 he toured Europe in a successful drive to recruit workers for Australia's underpopulated workforce, meeting with the leaders of several nations and Pope Paul VI. A conciliating presence between opposing factions both within and outside his party, he was also partly responsible for exposing the Khemlani loans affair that, although Lynch was not actively involved, was to contribute to the dismissal of the Whitlam government and election of Malcolm Fraser as prime minister in 1975.

Malcolm Fraser appointed Lynch treasurer in 1975. When the Treasury portfolio was split into Treasury and Finance in December 1976, Lynch held both portfolios. He is noted for using the expression "rubbery" to describe some of the estimates in his 1977 Budget Speech, leading to the use of the expression "rubbery figures" in Australian political debate. He was forced to resign from the ministry on 19 November 1977 when it became known that he was using a family trust to minimise his tax obligations, which was perceived as a conflict of interest. He was replaced as treasurer by John Howard and as minister for finance by Eric Robinson. An official inquiry found that he had done nothing illegal or improper, and he returned to the ministry in December, as minister for industry and commerce after facing a challenge for the deputy leadership from Defence Minister James Killen, which he defeated by 71 votes to 20.

After the 1980 election, Fraser formed the Committee of Review of Government Functions, popularly known as the "Razor Gang", which Lynch chaired.

He was also challenged again for the deputy leadership this time by Minister for Foreign Affairs Andrew Peacock, who he defeated by 47 votes to 35.

== Honours and family life ==
Lynch was named a Knight Commander of the Order of St Michael and St George in the 1981 New Year Honours. He was also made a Privy Councillor in 1977, allowing him to use the pre-nominal letters The Right Honourable. He resigned his parliamentary seat on the grounds of ill-health in 1982, and died of stomach cancer in 1984. Sir Phillip's wife, Leah O'Toole, had been a boarder at St Ann's Ladies' College, Warrnambool and later worked as an occupational therapist and as company secretary and director of Denistoun Pty Ltd. Sir Phillip and Lady Lynch had three sons. Lady Lynch, known for her charity work, died in 2007.

Parliament of Australia
Preceded by Robert Lindsay	Member for Flinders; 1966–1982	Succeeded by Peter Reith
Political offices
Preceded by Malcolm Fraser	Minister for the Army; 1968–1969	Succeeded by Andrew Peacock
Preceded by Billy Snedden	Minister for Immigration; 1969–1971	Succeeded by Jim Forbes
Preceded by Billy Snedden	Minister for Labour and National Service; 1971–1972	Succeeded by Clyde Cameron
Preceded by Bill Hayden	Treasurer of Australia; 1975–1977	Succeeded by John Howard
New office	Minister for Finance; 1976–1977	Succeeded by Eric Robinson
Preceded by Bob Cotton	Minister for Industry and Commerce; 1977–1982	Succeeded by Andrew Peacock
Party political offices
Preceded by Billy Snedden	Deputy Leader of the Liberal Party of Australia; 1972–1982	Succeeded by John Howard
