= Division of Flinders =

Australian federal electoral division

Coordinates: 38.346°S 145.324°E

Flinders Australian House of Representatives Division
- Interactive map of electorate boundaries from the 2025 federal election
- Created: 1901
- MP: Zoe McKenzie
- Party: Liberal
- Namesake: Matthew Flinders
- Electors: 127,620 (2025)
- Area: 887 km^{2} (342.5 sq mi)
- Demographic: Semi-rural
Electorates around Flinders:
Port Phillip	Dunkley	Holt
Port Phillip	Flinders	Western Port
Bass Strait	Bass Strait	Western Port

The Division of Flinders is an Australian Electoral Division in Victoria. The division is one of the original 65 divisions contested at the first federal election. It is named after Matthew Flinders, the first man to circumnavigate Australia, and the person credited with giving Australia its name.

Originally a country seat south and east of Melbourne, Flinders is now based on the outer southern suburbs on the Mornington Peninsula, including Dromana, Hastings and Portsea. Even though Melbourne's suburban growth has long since spilled onto the peninsula, Flinders is still counted as a rural seat.

== Geography ==
Since 1984, federal electoral division boundaries in Australia have been determined at re-distributions by a re-distribution committee appointed by the Australian Electoral Commission. Re-distributions occur for the boundaries of divisions in a particular state, and they occur every seven years, or sooner if a state's representation entitlement changes or when divisions of a state are malapportioned.

When the division was proclaimed in 1900, it included areas south-east of Melbourne such as Dandenong, Frankston and Pakenham, as well as Mornington Peninsula, West Gippsland and South Gippsland. In 1906, it lost some areas of South Gippsland such as the Wilsons Promontory to the Division of Gippsland, but also expanded northwards into areas east of Melbourne, such as Nunawading, Glen Waverley, Belgrave and Ferntree Gully.

In 1913, the division was further expanded northwards into the Yarra Valley north-east of Melbourne, replacing the abolished Division of Mernda, as well as areas in the Shire of Eltham. It lost areas around Nunawading to other divisions, as well as further South Gippsland areas (such as Leongatha) to the Division of Gippsland. The division also began to neighbour the Division of Corio at the Diamond Valley area (Eltham, Research and Hurstbridge). Together with Corio, both divisions formed a ring that completely surrounded Melbourne, stretching from Surf Coast on one end to Bass Coast on the other.

In 1922, the northern portion of the division was shifted south-west into the Shire of Heidelberg (previously in the Division of Bourke), Shire of Doncaster & Templestowe and the Shire of Nunawading (later City of Box Hill and City of Nunawading). It lost the areas at Yarra Valley, Ringwood, Research and Warrandyte to the Division of Indi, and further areas of South Gippsland (Korumburra) to the Division of Gippsland. This new northern portion was lost to the new Division of Deakin in 1937 and the division was cut back to roughly the current alignment of Canterbury Road at Vermont and Bayswater. At the same time, the divisions also lost further areas of South Gippsland to the Division of Gippsland, such as San Remo.

The division was further shrunk back in 1949 to the area around Dandenong (but not including). At the same time, majority of West Gippsland and the remaining areas of South Gippsland were also lost to the new Division of McMillan, but Phillip Island and French Island were retained. The division was then further shrunk back to the area around Frankston in 1955. The division lost Cranbourne South and Phillip Island to the Division of Holt and Division of McMillan respectively in 1977, and then regained them along with South Gippsland in 1984. In the same year, it also lost Frankston to the new Division of Dunkley in 1984.

In 1989, the division lost Langwarrin to Dunkley. It also lost Cranbourne South, South Gippsland and Phillip Island for the second time, which became part of the new Division of Corinella, but regained them from Corinella when the latter was abolished in 1994 (excluding Wonthaggi). It also briefly included Cranbourne East and Clyde North between 1994 and 2003. In 2018, it lost Cranbourne South, South Gippsland and Phillip Island for the third time to the Division of Holt, Division of La Trobe and the new Division of Monash.

Since its creation in 1900 until present (as of 2025), the division has always included the Mornington Peninsula and French Island.

As of the 2024 redistribution, the division contains the majority of Shire of Mornington Peninsula and French Island, excluding a portion of Mount Eliza.

== History ==
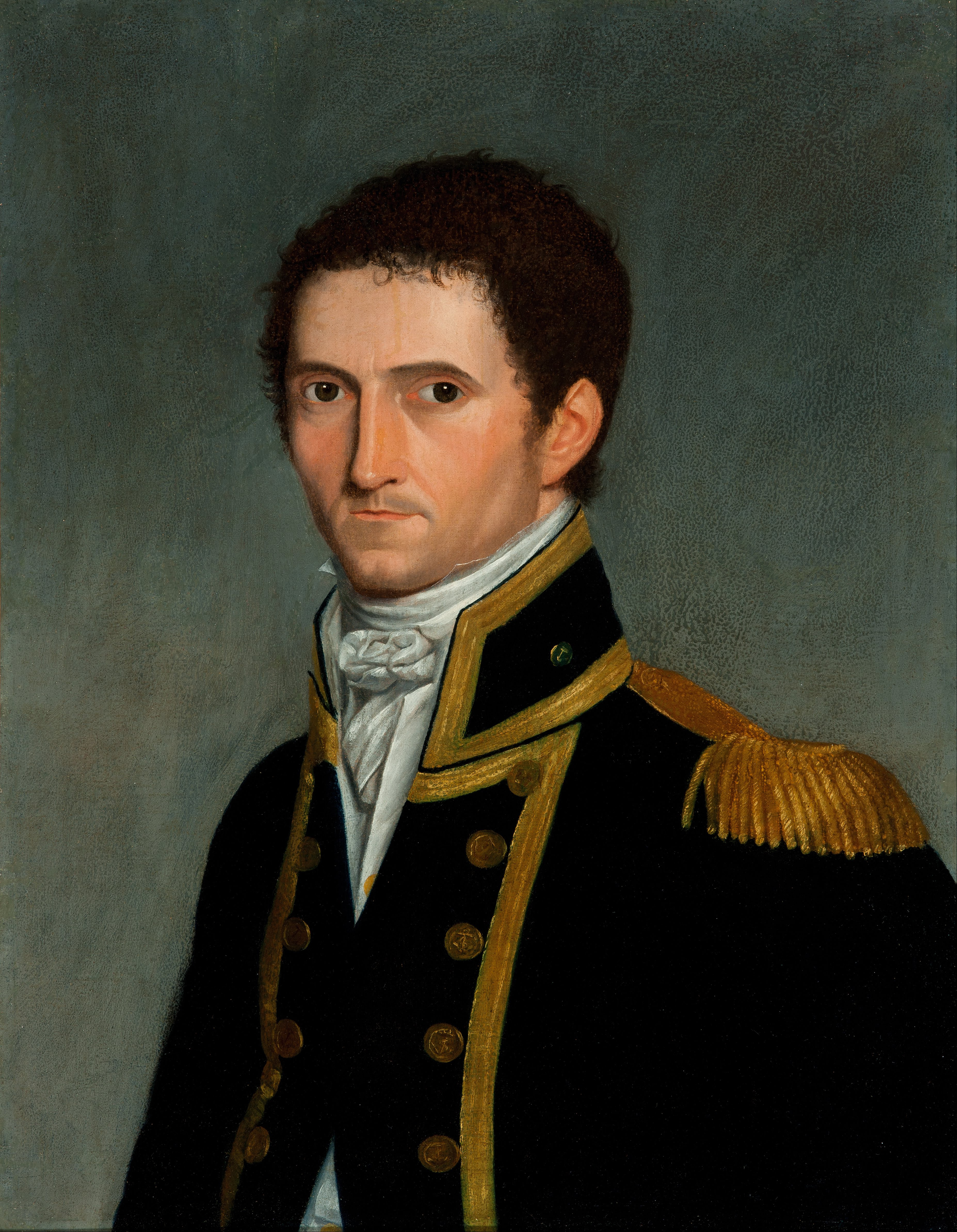
Matthew Flinders, the division's namesake

It has usually been a fairly safe seat for the Liberal Party and its predecessors, who have held it for all but six years since its creation. However, it has occasionally been won by the Australian Labor Party, notably at the 1929 federal election when Prime Minister Stanley Bruce was defeated. This was the first of two times an incumbent Australian prime minister lost his own seat at a general election; the second time was not until Liberal Prime Minister John Howard lost his seat of Bennelong at the 2007 federal election.

The seat's most prominent member was Bruce, who held it for all but two years from 1918 to 1933. Other prominent former members include Jack Holloway, the Labor challenger who ousted Bruce and later a senior minister in the Curtin and Chifley governments (though he was the member for Melbourne Ports by then) and two deputy Liberal leaders – Sir Phillip Lynch (a minister in the Gorton, McMahon and Fraser governments) and Peter Reith (a minister in the Howard government).

== Members ==
Image	Member	Party	Term	Notes
	Arthur Groom (1852–1922)	Free Trade	29 March 1901 – 23 November 1903	Previously held the Victorian Legislative Assembly seat of Gippsland West. Retired
	James Gibb (1843–1919)	Free Trade	16 December 1903 – 1906	Previously held the Victorian Legislative Assembly seat of Mornington. Did not contest in 1906. Failed to win the Division of Hume
	James Gibb (1843–1919)	Anti-Socialist	1906 – 12 December 1906	Previously held the Victorian Legislative Assembly seat of Mornington. Did not contest in 1906. Failed to win the Division of Hume
	Sir William Irvine (1858–1943)	Anti-Socialist	12 December 1906 – 26 May 1909	Previously held the Victorian Legislative Assembly seat of Lowan. Served as minister under Cook. Resigned to become Chief Justice of the Victorian Supreme Court
	Sir William Irvine (1858–1943)	Liberal	26 May 1909 – 17 February 1917	Previously held the Victorian Legislative Assembly seat of Lowan. Served as minister under Cook. Resigned to become Chief Justice of the Victorian Supreme Court
	Sir William Irvine (1858–1943)	Nationalist	17 February 1917 – 5 April 1918	Previously held the Victorian Legislative Assembly seat of Lowan. Served as minister under Cook. Resigned to become Chief Justice of the Victorian Supreme Court
	Stanley Bruce (1883–1967)	Nationalist	11 May 1918 – 12 October 1929	Served as minister under Hughes. Served as Prime Minister from 1923 to 1929. Lost seat
	Jack Holloway (1875–1967)	Labor	12 October 1929 – 19 December 1931	Transferred to the Division of Melbourne Ports
	Stanley Bruce (1883–1967)	United Australia	19 December 1931 – 6 October 1933	Served as minister under Lyons. Resigned to become the High Commissioner to the United Kingdom
	James Fairbairn (1897–1940)	United Australia	11 November 1933 – 13 August 1940	Previously held the Victorian Legislative Assembly seat of Warrnambool. Served as minister under Menzies. Died in office.
	Rupert Ryan (1884–1952)	United Australia	21 September 1940 – 21 February 1945	Died in office
	Rupert Ryan (1884–1952)	Liberal	21 February 1945 – 25 August 1952	Died in office
	Keith Ewert (1918–1989)	Labor	18 October 1952 – 29 May 1954	Lost seat
	Robert Lindsay (1905–2000)	Liberal	29 May 1954 – 31 October 1966	Retired
	Sir Phillip Lynch (1933–1984)	Liberal	26 November 1966 – 22 October 1982	Served as minister under Gorton, McMahon and Fraser. Resigned due to ill health
	Peter Reith (1950–2022)	Liberal	4 December 1982 – 5 March 1983	Lost seat
	Bob Chynoweth (1941–)	Labor	5 March 1983 – 1 December 1984	Transferred to the Division of Dunkley
	Peter Reith (1950–2022)	Liberal	1 December 1984 – 8 October 2001	Served as minister under Howard. Retired
	Greg Hunt (1965–)	Liberal	10 November 2001 – 11 April 2022	Served as minister under Abbott, Turnbull and Morrison. Retired
	Zoe McKenzie (1972–)	Liberal	21 May 2022 – present	Incumbent

== Election results ==
2025 Australian federal election: Flinders
Party	Candidate	Votes	%	±%
Liberal	Zoe McKenzie	47,375	41.22	−2.07
Labor	Sarah Race	25,622	22.29	−0.56
Independent	Ben Smith	24,406	21.24	+21.24
Greens	Adam Frogley	7,305	6.36	−3.15
One Nation	Mike Brown	6,091	5.30	+2.01
Trumpet of Patriots	Jason Smart (withdrew)	3,144	2.74	+2.25
Independent	Joseph Toscano	980	0.85	+0.85
Total formal votes		114,923	96.44	+1.75
Informal votes		4,246	3.56	−1.75
Turnout		119,169	93.44	+1.65
Notional two-party-preferred count
Liberal	Zoe McKenzie	62,957	54.78	−1.38
Labor	Sarah Race	51,966	45.22	+1.38
Two-candidate-preferred result
Liberal	Zoe McKenzie	60,090	52.29	−3.88
Independent	Ben Smith	54,833	47.71	+47.71
Liberal hold				
