= Garnet Point =

Coastal point in Watt Bay, Antarctica

Garnet Point (66°56′S 143°46′E) is a rocky coastal point consisting of garnet gneiss, located at the west side of the entrance to Watt Bay, in the George V Coast area of Antarctica. Garnet Point was discovered by the Australasian Antarctic Expedition (1911–14) under Douglas Mawson, and named by that expedition's geological party led by Frank L. Stillwell.
