= Watt Bay =

Bay in Antarctica

Watt Bay (67°2′S 144°0′E) is a bay about 16 nautical miles (30 km) wide indenting the coast between Garnet Point and Cape De la Motte. Discovered by the Australasian Antarctic Expedition (1911–14) under Douglas Mawson, who named it for W.A. Watt, Premier of Victoria in 1911.
