= Electoral results for the Division of Wills =

Australian division election results

This is a list of electoral results for the Division of Wills in Australian federal elections from the division's creation in 1949 until the present.

== Members ==
| Member | Party | Term |
|---|---|---|
| Bill Bryson | Labor | 1949–1955 |
| Bill Bryson | Labor (A-C) | 1955–1955 |
| Gordon Bryant | Labor | 1955–1980 |
| Bob Hawke | Labor | 1980–1992 |
| Phil Cleary | Independent | 1992 by–1996 |
| Kelvin Thomson | Labor | 1996–2016 |
| Peter Khalil | Labor | 2016–present |

== Election results ==
=== Elections in the 2020s ===
==== 2025 ====
2025 Australian federal election: Wills
| Party | Candidate | Votes | % | ±% |
|---|---|---|---|---|
| Labor | Peter Khalil | 39,069 | 35.59 | −0.83 |
| Greens | Samantha Ratnam | 38,834 | 35.37 | +2.54 |
| Liberal | Jeff Kidney | 14,121 | 12.86 | −3.33 |
| Socialist Alliance | Sue Bolton | 8,808 | 8.02 | +5.13 |
| One Nation | Bruce Stevens | 3,842 | 3.50 | +1.05 |
| Legalise Cannabis | Margee Glover | 3,067 | 2.79 | +2.79 |
| Fusion | Owen Miller | 1,122 | 1.02 | +1.02 |
| Libertarian | Rachel Versteegen | 918 | 0.84 | +0.59 |
| Total formal votes | | 109,781 | 95.56 | +0.22 |
| Informal votes | | 5,106 | 4.44 | −0.22 |
| Turnout | | 114,887 | 91.72 | +5.52 |
Notional two-party-preferred count
| Labor | Peter Khalil | 88,770 | 80.86 | +3.77 |
| Liberal | Jeff Kidney | 21,011 | 19.14 | −3.77 |
Two-candidate-preferred result
| Labor | Peter Khalil | 56,459 | 51.43 | −7.60 |
| Greens | Samantha Ratnam | 53,322 | 48.57 | +7.60 |
| Labor hold | | Swing | −7.60 | |

==== 2022 ====
2022 Australian federal election: Wills
| Party | Candidate | Votes | % | ±% |
|---|---|---|---|---|
| Labor | Peter Khalil | 35,449 | 38.87 | −5.39 |
| Greens | Sarah Jefford | 25,793 | 28.28 | +2.01 |
| Liberal | Tom Wright | 15,771 | 17.29 | −0.76 |
| United Australia | Irene Zivkovic | 3,352 | 3.68 | +0.54 |
| Socialist Alliance | Sue Bolton | 3,096 | 3.39 | +3.39 |
| Victorian Socialists | Emma Black | 2,714 | 2.98 | −1.53 |
| One Nation | Jill Tindal | 2,554 | 2.80 | +2.80 |
| Animal Justice | Leah Horsfall | 1,680 | 1.84 | −1.92 |
| Federation | Sam Sergi | 789 | 0.87 | +0.87 |
| Total formal votes | | 91,198 | 94.95 | −0.77 |
| Informal votes | | 4,855 | 5.05 | +0.77 |
| Turnout | | 96,053 | 88.61 | −2.55 |
Notional two-party-preferred count
| Labor | Peter Khalil | 69,104 | 75.77 | +0.06 |
| Liberal | Tom Wright | 22,094 | 24.23 | −0.06 |
Two-candidate-preferred result
| Labor | Peter Khalil | 53,415 | 58.57 | +0.10 |
| Greens | Sarah Jefford | 37,783 | 41.43 | −0.10 |
| Labor hold | | Swing | +0.10 | |

Alluvial diagram for preference flows in the seat of Wills in the 2022 federal election. indicates at what stage the winning candidate had over 50% of the votes and was declared the winner.

=== Elections in the 2010s ===
==== 2019 ====
2019 Australian federal election: Wills
| Party | Candidate | Votes | % | ±% |
|---|---|---|---|---|
| Labor | Peter Khalil | 42,355 | 44.08 | +6.17 |
| Greens | Adam Pulford | 25,575 | 26.62 | −4.29 |
| Liberal | Peter Killin | 17,241 | 17.94 | −3.60 |
| Victorian Socialists | Sue Bolton | 4,344 | 4.52 | +4.52 |
| Animal Justice | Chris Miles | 3,596 | 3.74 | +2.08 |
| United Australia | Manju Venkat | 2,979 | 3.10 | +3.10 |
| Total formal votes | | 96,090 | 95.77 | +2.61 |
| Informal votes | | 4,243 | 4.23 | −2.61 |
| Turnout | | 100,333 | 90.67 | +3.25 |
Notional two-party-preferred count
| Labor | Peter Khalil | 72,888 | 75.85 | +4.18 |
| Liberal | Peter Killin | 23,202 | 24.15 | −4.18 |
Two-candidate-preferred result
| Labor | Peter Khalil | 55,898 | 58.17 | +3.24 |
| Greens | Adam Pulford | 40,192 | 41.83 | −3.24 |
| Labor hold | | Swing | +3.24 | |

==== 2016 ====
2016 Australian federal election: Wills
| Party | Candidate | Votes | % | ±% |
|---|---|---|---|---|
| Labor | Peter Khalil | 35,431 | 37.65 | −7.49 |
| Greens | Samantha Ratnam | 29,017 | 30.83 | +8.60 |
| Liberal | Kevin Hong | 20,634 | 21.93 | −0.91 |
| Sex Party | Tristram Chellew | 2,608 | 2.77 | +0.16 |
| Independent | Francesco Timpano | 1,832 | 1.95 | +1.95 |
| Animal Justice | Camille Sydow | 1,578 | 1.68 | +1.68 |
| Drug Law Reform | Ash Blackwell | 1,287 | 1.37 | +1.37 |
| Renewable Energy | Dougal Gillman | 778 | 0.83 | +0.83 |
| Socialist Alliance | Zane Alcorn | 648 | 0.69 | −0.44 |
| Socialist Equality | Will Fulgenzi | 295 | 0.31 | +0.31 |
| Total formal votes | | 94,108 | 93.25 | −1.22 |
| Informal votes | | 6,807 | 6.75 | +1.22 |
| Turnout | | 100,915 | 88.64 | −2.29 |
Notional two-party-preferred count
| Labor | Peter Khalil | 67,037 | 71.23 | +0.47 |
| Liberal | Kevin Hong | 27,071 | 28.77 | −0.47 |
Two-candidate-preferred result
| Labor | Peter Khalil | 51,646 | 54.88 | −10.32 |
| Greens | Samantha Ratnam | 42,462 | 45.12 | +10.32 |
| Labor hold | | Swing | −10.32 | |

==== 2013 ====
2013 Australian federal election: Wills
| Party | Candidate | Votes | % | ±% |
|---|---|---|---|---|
| Labor | Kelvin Thomson | 40,931 | 45.14 | −6.07 |
| Liberal | Shilpa Hegde | 20,710 | 22.84 | +0.04 |
| Greens | Tim Read | 20,157 | 22.23 | +0.12 |
| Sex Party | Adrian Trajstman | 2,363 | 2.61 | +2.51 |
| Palmer United | Anne Murray-Dufoulon | 2,158 | 2.38 | +2.38 |
| Independent | Dean O'Callaghan | 2,040 | 2.25 | +2.25 |
| Family First | Concetta Giglia | 1,285 | 1.42 | −0.15 |
| Socialist Alliance | Margarita Windisch | 1,024 | 1.13 | +0.30 |
| Total formal votes | | 90,668 | 94.47 | +0.45 |
| Informal votes | | 5,304 | 5.53 | −0.45 |
| Turnout | | 95,972 | 90.97 | −0.16 |
Notional two-party-preferred count
| Labor | Kelvin Thomson | 64,161 | 70.76 | −2.77 |
| Liberal | Shilpa Hegde | 26,507 | 29.24 | +2.77 |
Two-candidate-preferred result
| Labor | Kelvin Thomson | 59,118 | 65.20 | −7.44 |
| Greens | Tim Read | 31,550 | 34.80 | +34.80 |
| Labor hold | | Swing | N/A | |

==== 2010 ====
2010 Australian federal election: Wills
| Party | Candidate | Votes | % | ±% |
|---|---|---|---|---|
| Labor | Kelvin Thomson | 43,718 | 51.81 | −5.08 |
| Liberal | Claude Tomisich | 20,080 | 23.79 | −0.76 |
| Greens | Mark Riley | 17,381 | 20.60 | +6.78 |
| Family First | Daniel Mumby | 1,320 | 1.56 | +0.13 |
| Democrats | Paul Roberton | 734 | 0.87 | −1.46 |
| Socialist Alliance | Trent Hawkins | 726 | 0.86 | +0.14 |
| Citizens Electoral Council | Craig Isherwood | 429 | 0.51 | +0.25 |
| Total formal votes | | 84,388 | 93.98 | −1.69 |
| Informal votes | | 5,403 | 6.02 | +1.69 |
| Turnout | | 89,791 | 91.07 | −2.60 |
Two-party-preferred result
| Labor | Kelvin Thomson | 61,297 | 72.64 | +0.24 |
| Liberal | Claude Tomisich | 23,091 | 27.36 | −0.24 |
| Labor hold | | Swing | +0.24 | |

=== Elections in the 2000s ===
==== 2007 ====
2007 Australian federal election: Wills
| Party | Candidate | Votes | % | ±% |
|---|---|---|---|---|
| Labor | Kelvin Thomson | 49,050 | 56.89 | +3.07 |
| Liberal | Claude Tomisich | 21,166 | 24.55 | −4.15 |
| Greens | David Collis | 11,912 | 13.82 | +0.82 |
| Democrats | Edward Clarke | 2,005 | 2.33 | +0.91 |
| Family First | Ihab Kelada | 1,233 | 1.43 | −0.12 |
| Socialist Alliance | Zane Alcorn | 624 | 0.72 | −0.34 |
| Citizens Electoral Council | Craig Isherwood | 227 | 0.26 | −0.19 |
| Total formal votes | | 86,217 | 95.67 | +1.17 |
| Informal votes | | 3,902 | 4.33 | −1.17 |
| Turnout | | 90,119 | 93.69 | +0.70 |
Two-party-preferred result
| Labor | Kelvin Thomson | 62,432 | 72.41 | +5.51 |
| Liberal | Claude Tomisich | 23,785 | 27.59 | −5.51 |
| Labor hold | | Swing | +5.51 | |

==== 2004 ====
2004 Australian federal election: Wills
| Party | Candidate | Votes | % | ±% |
|---|---|---|---|---|
| Labor | Kelvin Thomson | 44,158 | 53.82 | −2.22 |
| Liberal | Blair Hamilton | 23,549 | 28.70 | +3.23 |
| Greens | Toby Archer | 10,663 | 13.00 | +4.72 |
| Family First | Deborah Suraci | 1,275 | 1.55 | +1.55 |
| Democrats | Robert Stone | 1,163 | 1.42 | −4.81 |
| Socialist Alliance | David Glanz | 867 | 1.06 | +1.06 |
| Citizens Electoral Council | Noelene Isherwood | 373 | 0.45 | −1.04 |
| Total formal votes | | 82,048 | 94.50 | −0.15 |
| Informal votes | | 4,772 | 5.50 | +0.15 |
| Turnout | | 86,820 | 92.99 | −0.80 |
Two-party-preferred result
| Labor | Kelvin Thomson | 54,893 | 66.90 | −3.67 |
| Liberal | Blair Hamilton | 27,155 | 33.10 | +3.67 |
| Labor hold | | Swing | −3.67 | |

==== 2001 ====
2001 Australian federal election: Wills
| Party | Candidate | Votes | % | ±% |
|---|---|---|---|---|
| Labor | Kelvin Thomson | 44,019 | 56.03 | −7.93 |
| Liberal | Vytautas Valasinavicius | 21,030 | 26.77 | +1.08 |
| Greens | Richard Di Natale | 6,081 | 7.74 | +7.74 |
| Democrats | Robert Stone | 5,036 | 6.41 | +0.70 |
| Citizens Electoral Council | Craig Isherwood | 1,367 | 1.74 | +1.19 |
| Socialist Alliance | David Glanz | 1,036 | 1.32 | +1.32 |
| Total formal votes | | 78,569 | 94.81 | −0.92 |
| Informal votes | | 4,302 | 5.19 | +0.92 |
| Turnout | | 82,871 | 93.93 | |
Two-party-preferred result
| Labor | Kelvin Thomson | 54,542 | 69.42 | −1.54 |
| Liberal | Vytautas Valasinavicius | 24,027 | 30.56 | +1.54 |
| Labor hold | | Swing | −1.54 | |

=== Elections in the 1990s ===
==== 1998 ====
1998 Australian federal election: Wills
| Party | Candidate | Votes | % | ±% |
|---|---|---|---|---|
| Labor | Kelvin Thomson | 50,507 | 63.96 | +13.98 |
| Liberal | David Curry | 20,280 | 25.68 | +4.45 |
| Democrats | Robert Stone | 4,507 | 5.71 | +2.11 |
| Progressive Labour | Bill Deller | 1,875 | 2.37 | +2.37 |
| Unity | Randa Abdel-Fattah | 1,363 | 1.73 | +1.73 |
| Citizens Electoral Council | Andrew Fox | 435 | 0.55 | +0.55 |
| Total formal votes | | 78,967 | 95.73 | −0.62 |
| Informal votes | | 3,520 | 4.27 | +0.62 |
| Turnout | | 82,487 | 94.55 | −0.44 |
Two-party-preferred result
| Labor | Kelvin Thomson | 56,033 | 70.96 | +15.19 |
| Liberal | David Curry | 22,934 | 29.04 | +29.04 |
| Labor hold | | Swing | +15.19 | |

==== 1996 ====
1996 Australian federal election: Wills
| Party | Candidate | Votes | % | ±% |
|---|---|---|---|---|
| Labor | Kelvin Thomson | 39,014 | 49.98 | +4.37 |
| Independent | Phil Cleary | 17,747 | 22.74 | −2.73 |
| Liberal | Jack Minas | 16,576 | 21.24 | −3.30 |
| Democrats | Robert Stone | 2,811 | 3.60 | +1.49 |
| Independent | Sharon Keppel | 1,399 | 1.79 | +1.79 |
| Natural Law | Martin Richardson | 316 | 0.40 | −0.01 |
| Independent CEC | Craig Isherwood | 196 | 0.25 | +0.25 |
| Total formal votes | | 78,059 | 96.35 | −0.11 |
| Informal votes | | 2,957 | 3.65 | +0.11 |
| Turnout | | 81,016 | 94.99 | −0.27 |
Notional two-party-preferred count
| Labor | Kelvin Thomson | 56,067 | 72.21 | +12.29 |
| Liberal | Jack Minas | 21,574 | 27.79 | −12.29 |
Two-candidate-preferred result
| Labor | Kelvin Thomson | 43,394 | 55.77 | +4.10 |
| Independent | Phil Cleary | 34,417 | 44.23 | −4.10 |
| Labor gain from Independent | | Swing | +4.10 | |

The division was affected by a redistribution, however it is unclear what effect the new boundaries had on Cleary's margin. The swing compares the margin with the 1993 election without any notional adjustment.

==== 1993 ====
1993 Australian federal election: Wills
| Party | Candidate | Votes | % | ±% |
|---|---|---|---|---|
| Labor | Bill Kardamitsis | 29,499 | 41.88 | −6.80 |
| Independent | Phil Cleary | 20,721 | 29.42 | +29.42 |
| Liberal | Jack Minas | 17,386 | 24.68 | −9.80 |
| Democrats | Robert Stone | 1,474 | 2.09 | −7.48 |
| Independent | Katheryne Savage | 652 | 0.93 | +0.93 |
| | Ken Mantell | 271 | 0.38 | +0.38 |
| Imperial British | Cecil G. Murgatroyd | 219 | 0.31 | -0.17 |
| Natural Law | John Price | 212 | 0.30 | +0.30 |
| Total formal votes | | 70,434 | 96.64 | +2.99 |
| Informal votes | | 2,451 | 3.36 | −2.99 |
| Turnout | | 72,885 | 95.26 | |
Notional two-party-preferred count
| Labor | Bill Kardamitsis | 49,311 | 70.20 | +12.27 |
| Liberal | Jack Minas | 20,932 | 29.80 | −12.27 |
Two-candidate-preferred result
| Independent | Phil Cleary | 36,816 | 52.42 | +52.42 |
| Labor | Bill Kardamitsis | 33,412 | 47.58 | −10.30 |
| Independent gain from Labor | | Swing | N/A | |

Bob Hawke (Labor) had won the seat at the 1990 election, however he resigned in 1992 and Phil Cleary (Independent) won the seat at the resulting by-election.

==== 1992 by-election ====
Wills by-election, 1992
| Party | Candidate | Votes | % | ±% |
|---|---|---|---|---|
| Independent | Phil Cleary | 21,391 | 33.5 | +33.5 |
| Labor | Bill Kardamitsis | 18,784 | 29.4 | −19.3 |
| Liberal | John Delacretaz | 17,582 | 27.6 | −6.9 |
| Independent | Katheryne Savage | 1,660 | 2.6 | +2.6 |
| Democrats | David Mackay | 1,383 | 2.2 | −7.4 |
| AAFI | Angela Walker | 577 | 0.9 | +0.9 |
| Independent | Geraldine Rawson | 453 | 0.7 | +0.7 |
| Independent | Ian Sykes | 364 | 0.6 | −0.9 |
| Federal | Stan Germaine | 280 | 0.4 | +0.4 |
| Imperial British | Cecil G. Murgatroyd | 258 | 0.4 | −0.1 |
| Independent | Salvatore Ferraro | 221 | 0.4 | +0.4 |
| Independent | Bob Lewis | 216 | 0.3 | +0.3 |
| Socialist Labour League | Richard Phillips | 136 | 0.2 | +0.2 |
| Independent | Bill French | 90 | 0.1 | +0.1 |
| Independent | Kon Kyrou | 81 | 0.1 | +0.1 |
| Independent | Julien Droulers | 68 | 0.1 | +0.1 |
| | Patricia Poulos | 61 | 0.1 | +0.1 |
| Independent | John Murray | 54 | 0.1 | +0.1 |
| Independent | Chris Vassis | 43 | 0.1 | +0.1 |
| Republican | Otto Kuhne | 35 | 0.1 | +0.1 |
| Independent | Will Kapphan | 34 | 0.1 | +0.1 |
| Independent | Felicia Potter | 30 | 0.1 | +0.1 |
| Total formal votes | | 63,801 | 93.6 | +0.00 |
| Informal votes | | 4,348 | 6.4 | +0.00 |
| Turnout | | 68,149 | 89.4 | −4.9 |
Two-party-preferred result
| Labor | Bill Kardamitis | 40,416 | 63.8 | +5.9 |
| Liberal | John Delacretaz | 22,942 | 36.2 | −5.9 |
Two-candidate-preferred result
| Independent | Phil Cleary | 41,708 | 65.7 | +65.7 |
| Labor | Bill Kardamitsis | 21,772 | 34.3 | −23.6 |
| Independent gain from Labor | | | | |

==== 1990 ====
1990 Australian federal election: Wills
| Party | Candidate | Votes | % | ±% |
|---|---|---|---|---|
| Labor | Bob Hawke | 32,596 | 48.7 | −9.3 |
| Liberal | John Delacretaz | 23,088 | 34.5 | +4.3 |
| Democrats | Philip Mendes | 6,413 | 9.6 | +3.2 |
| Democratic Labor | Mark Beshara | 2,564 | 3.8 | +3.8 |
| Independent | Ian Sykes | 986 | 1.5 | +0.4 |
| Democratic Socialist | Lali Chelliah | 678 | 1.0 | +1.0 |
| Imperial British | Cecil G. Murgatroyd | 319 | 0.5 | +0.5 |
| Independent | Marc Aussie-Stone | 316 | 0.5 | +0.5 |
| Total formal votes | | 66,960 | 93.6 | |
| Informal votes | | 4,541 | 6.4 | |
| Turnout | | 71,501 | 94.3 | |
Two-party-preferred result
| Labor | Bob Hawke | 38,708 | 57.9 | −8.2 |
| Liberal | John Delacretaz | 28,116 | 42.1 | +8.2 |
| Labor hold | | Swing | −8.2 | |

=== Elections in the 1980s ===
==== 1987 ====
1987 Australian federal election: Wills
| Party | Candidate | Votes | % | ±% |
|---|---|---|---|---|
| Labor | Bob Hawke | 35,849 | 61.8 | −4.7 |
| Liberal | Olga Venables | 15,318 | 26.4 | +3.0 |
| Democrats | Ken Eley | 3,729 | 6.4 | +2.4 |
| Independent | Fast Bucks | 1,400 | 2.4 | +2.4 |
| Independent | Lyn Teather | 1,092 | 1.9 | +1.9 |
| Independent | Ian Sykes | 650 | 1.1 | +1.1 |
| Total formal votes | | 58,038 | 91.4 | |
| Informal votes | | 5,480 | 8.6 | |
| Turnout | | 63,518 | 93.3 | |
Two-party-preferred result
| Labor | Bob Hawke | 40,519 | 69.9 | −0.4 |
| Liberal | Olga Venables | 17,432 | 30.1 | +0.4 |
| Labor hold | | Swing | −0.4 | |

==== 1984 ====
1984 Australian federal election: Wills
| Party | Candidate | Votes | % | ±% |
|---|---|---|---|---|
| Labor | Bob Hawke | 38,846 | 66.5 | +1.5 |
| Liberal | Victor Perton | 13,649 | 23.4 | −1.1 |
| Democrats | Peter Allan | 2,350 | 4.0 | −2.3 |
| Independent | Mark Ferguson | 1,360 | 2.3 | +2.3 |
| Independent | Lance Hutchinson | 1,056 | 1.8 | +1.8 |
| Democratic Labor | Gloria Brook | 856 | 1.5 | −0.2 |
| Independent | Martin Mantell | 242 | 0.4 | +0.4 |
| Independent | Glen Mann | 81 | 0.1 | +0.1 |
| Total formal votes | | 58,440 | 89.2 | |
| Informal votes | | 7,097 | 10.8 | |
| Turnout | | 65,537 | 94.2 | |
Two-party-preferred result
| Labor | Bob Hawke | 40,986 | 70.3 | −1.2 |
| Liberal | Victor Perton | 17,352 | 29.7 | +1.2 |
| Labor hold | | Swing | −1.2 | |

==== 1983 ====
1983 Australian federal election: Wills
| Party | Candidate | Votes | % | ±% |
|---|---|---|---|---|
| Labor | Bob Hawke | 45,571 | 67.6 | +2.5 |
| Liberal | Mark Hoysted | 14,773 | 21.9 | −4.5 |
| Democrats | John Hallam | 4,225 | 6.3 | +2.6 |
| Socialist Labour | Martin Mantell | 1,287 | 1.9 | +1.2 |
| Democratic Labor | Michael Verberne | 1,145 | 1.7 | −0.2 |
| Socialist Workers | Solomon Salby | 206 | 0.3 | −0.7 |
| Imperial British | Cecil G. Murgatroyd | 174 | 0.3 | +0.3 |
| Total formal votes | | 67,381 | 96.2 | |
| Informal votes | | 2,660 | 3.8 | |
| Turnout | | 70,041 | 95.3 | |
Two-party-preferred result
| Labor | Bob Hawke | | 74.1 | +4.2 |
| Liberal | Mark Hoysted | | 25.9 | −4.2 |
| Labor hold | | Swing | +4.2 | |

==== 1980 ====
1980 Australian federal election: Wills
| Party | Candidate | Votes | % | ±% |
|---|---|---|---|---|
| Labor | Bob Hawke | 42,815 | 65.1 | +7.5 |
| Liberal | Vincenzo d'Aquino | 17,337 | 26.4 | +0.0 |
| Democrats | Kenneth Goss | 2,407 | 3.7 | −4.8 |
| Democratic Labor | Thomas Stewart | 1,256 | 1.9 | −5.5 |
| Socialist Workers | Solomon Salby | 677 | 1.0 | +1.0 |
| Socialist Labour | Michael Head | 490 | 0.7 | +0.7 |
| Independent | Martin Newell | 410 | 0.6 | +0.6 |
| Communist | Philip Herington | 368 | 0.6 | +0.6 |
| Total formal votes | | 65,760 | 94.5 | |
| Informal votes | | 3,846 | 5.5 | |
| Turnout | | 69,606 | 94.3 | |
Two-party-preferred result
| Labor | Bob Hawke | | 69.9 | +7.3 |
| Liberal | Vincenzo d'Aquino | | 30.1 | −7.3 |
| Labor hold | | Swing | +7.3 | |

=== Elections in the 1970s ===
==== 1977 ====
1977 Australian federal election: Wills
| Party | Candidate | Votes | % | ±% |
|---|---|---|---|---|
| Labor | Gordon Bryant | 38,456 | 57.6 | −0.5 |
| Liberal | Thomas Burrowes | 17,597 | 26.4 | −8.4 |
| Democrats | Vernon Weaver | 5,703 | 8.5 | +8.5 |
| Democratic Labor | John Flint | 4,964 | 7.4 | +0.3 |
| Total formal votes | | 66,703 | 96.1 | |
| Informal votes | | 2,702 | 3.9 | |
| Turnout | | 69,442 | 94.5 | |
Two-party-preferred result
| Labor | Gordon Bryant | | 62.6 | +3.8 |
| Liberal | Thomas Burrowes | | 37.4 | −3.8 |
| Labor hold | | Swing | +3.8 | |

==== 1975 ====
1975 Australian federal election: Wills
| Party | Candidate | Votes | % | ±% |
|---|---|---|---|---|
| Labor | Gordon Bryant | 32,382 | 60.2 | −1.1 |
| Liberal | Howard Kiel | 17,562 | 32.7 | +2.9 |
| Democratic Labor | John Flint | 3,819 | 7.1 | +0.7 |
| Total formal votes | | 53,763 | 97.6 | |
| Informal votes | | 1,336 | 2.4 | |
| Turnout | | 55,099 | 95.9 | |
Two-party-preferred result
| Labor | Gordon Bryant | | 60.9 | −2.5 |
| Liberal | Howard Kiel | | 39.1 | +2.5 |
| Labor hold | | Swing | −2.5 | |

==== 1974 ====
1974 Australian federal election: Wills
| Party | Candidate | Votes | % | ±% |
|---|---|---|---|---|
| Labor | Gordon Bryant | 32,721 | 61.3 | +0.6 |
| Liberal | John Bales | 15,923 | 29.8 | +1.8 |
| Democratic Labor | John Flint | 3,430 | 6.4 | −4.9 |
| Australia | Stanley Bell | 944 | 1.8 | +1.8 |
| Republican | Bruce Drinkwater | 385 | 0.7 | +0.7 |
| Total formal votes | | 53,403 | 96.8 | |
| Informal votes | | 1,793 | 3.2 | |
| Turnout | | 55,196 | 95.8 | |
Two-party-preferred result
| Labor | Gordon Bryant | | 63.4 | +1.6 |
| Liberal | John Bales | | 36.6 | −1.6 |
| Labor hold | | Swing | +1.6 | |

==== 1972 ====
1972 Australian federal election: Wills
| Party | Candidate | Votes | % | ±% |
|---|---|---|---|---|
| Labor | Gordon Bryant | 30,410 | 60.7 | +9.8 |
| Liberal | John Gray | 14,015 | 28.0 | −1.6 |
| Democratic Labor | John Flint | 5,650 | 11.3 | −0.6 |
| Total formal votes | | 50,075 | 96.5 | |
| Informal votes | | 51,897 | 95.8 | |
| Turnout | | 50,075 | 96.5 | |
Two-party-preferred result
| Labor | Gordon Bryant | | 61.8 | +5.4 |
| Liberal | John Gray | | 38.2 | −5.4 |
| Labor hold | | Swing | +5.4 | |

=== Elections in the 1960s ===
==== 1969 ====
1969 Australian federal election: Wills
| Party | Candidate | Votes | % | ±% |
|---|---|---|---|---|
| Labor | Gordon Bryant | 25,839 | 50.9 | −0.7 |
| Liberal | Peter Frankel | 15,046 | 29.6 | −3.5 |
| Democratic Labor | John Flint | 6,021 | 11.9 | −3.3 |
| Independent | John Bennett | 3,367 | 6.6 | +6.6 |
| Independent | Milan Breier | 280 | 0.6 | +0.6 |
| Independent | Geraldine Phelan | 251 | 0.5 | +0.5 |
| Total formal votes | | 50,804 | 93.9 | |
| Informal votes | | 3,325 | 6.1 | |
| Turnout | | 54,129 | 95.5 | |
Two-party-preferred result
| Labor | Gordon Bryant | | 56.4 | +3.3 |
| Liberal | Peter Frankel | | 43.6 | −3.3 |
| Labor hold | | Swing | +3.3 | |

==== 1966 ====
1966 Australian federal election: Wills
| Party | Candidate | Votes | % | ±% |
|---|---|---|---|---|
| Labor | Gordon Bryant | 18,455 | 53.6 | −0.5 |
| Liberal | David Hutchinson | 10,714 | 31.1 | +2.2 |
| Democratic Labor | John Flint | 5,239 | 15.2 | −1.7 |
| Total formal votes | | 34,408 | 95.1 | |
| Informal votes | | 1,776 | 4.9 | |
| Turnout | | 36,184 | 94.8 | |
Two-party-preferred result
| Labor | Gordon Bryant | | 55.1 | −0.7 |
| Liberal | David Hutchinson | | 44.9 | +0.7 |
| Labor hold | | Swing | −0.7 | |

==== 1963 ====
1963 Australian federal election: Wills
| Party | Candidate | Votes | % | ±% |
|---|---|---|---|---|
| Labor | Gordon Bryant | 20,197 | 54.1 | −3.9 |
| Liberal | James Muntz | 10,795 | 28.9 | +6.7 |
| Democratic Labor | John Hardy | 6,315 | 16.9 | −2.9 |
| Total formal votes | | 37,307 | 97.5 | |
| Informal votes | | 945 | 2.5 | |
| Turnout | | 38,252 | 96.2 | |
Two-party-preferred result
| Labor | Gordon Bryant | | 55.8 | −4.2 |
| Liberal | James Muntz | | 44.2 | +4.2 |
| Labor hold | | Swing | −4.2 | |

==== 1961 ====
1961 Australian federal election: Wills
| Party | Candidate | Votes | % | ±% |
|---|---|---|---|---|
| Labor | Gordon Bryant | 22,115 | 58.0 | +4.3 |
| Liberal | William Pyatt | 8,454 | 22.2 | −4.3 |
| Democratic Labor | Bill Bryson | 7,553 | 19.8 | −0.1 |
| Total formal votes | | 38,122 | 96.7 | |
| Informal votes | | 1,300 | 3.3 | |
| Turnout | | 39,422 | 95.3 | |
Two-party-preferred result
| Labor | Gordon Bryant | | 60.0 | +4.3 |
| Liberal | William Pyatt | | 40.0 | −4.3 |
| Labor hold | | Swing | +4.3 | |

=== Elections in the 1950s ===
==== 1958 ====
1958 Australian federal election: Wills
| Party | Candidate | Votes | % | ±% |
|---|---|---|---|---|
| Labor | Gordon Bryant | 21,308 | 53.7 | +6.4 |
| Liberal | Alfred Wall | 10,498 | 26.5 | −1.5 |
| Democratic Labor | Bill Bryson | 7,881 | 19.9 | −4.8 |
| Total formal votes | | 39,687 | 97.1 | |
| Informal votes | | 1,170 | 2.9 | |
| Turnout | | 40,857 | 96.2 | |
Two-party-preferred result
| Labor | Gordon Bryant | | 55.7 | +1.3 |
| Liberal | Alfred Wall | | 44.3 | −1.3 |
| Labor hold | | Swing | +1.3 | |

==== 1955 ====
1955 Australian federal election: Wills
| Party | Candidate | Votes | % | ±% |
|---|---|---|---|---|
| Labor | Gordon Bryant | 19,363 | 47.3 | −18.5 |
| Liberal | Alfred Wall | 11,478 | 28.0 | −4.9 |
| Labor (A-C) | Bill Bryson | 10,115 | 24.7 | +24.7 |
| Total formal votes | | 40,956 | 96.9 | |
| Informal votes | | 1,316 | 3.1 | |
| Turnout | | 42,272 | 94.5 | |
Two-party-preferred result
| Labor | Gordon Bryant | 22,269 | 54.4 | −12.5 |
| Liberal | Alfred Wall | 18,687 | 45.6 | +12.5 |
| Labor hold | | Swing | −12.5 | |

==== 1954 ====
1954 Australian federal election: Wills
| Party | Candidate | Votes | % | ±% |
|---|---|---|---|---|
| Labor | Bill Bryson | 27,538 | 62.4 | +13.5 |
| Liberal | Ian Ingram | 16,595 | 37.6 | +4.1 |
| Total formal votes | | 44,133 | 98.7 | |
| Informal votes | | 590 | 1.3 | |
| Turnout | | 44,723 | 96.4 | |
| Labor hold | | Swing | +0.6 | |

==== 1951 ====
1951 Australian federal election: Wills
| Party | Candidate | Votes | % | ±% |
|---|---|---|---|---|
| Labor | Bill Bryson | 21,136 | 48.9 | +4.7 |
| Liberal | Baden Grafen | 14,461 | 33.5 | −1.8 |
| Progressive Labor | Doris Blackburn | 7,595 | 17.6 | −3.0 |
| Total formal votes | | 43,192 | 98.2 | |
| Informal votes | | 782 | 1.8 | |
| Turnout | | 43,974 | 96.3 | |
Two-party-preferred result
| Labor | Bill Bryson | 26,682 | 61.8 | +3.0 |
| Liberal | Baden Grafen | 16,510 | 38.2 | −3.0 |
| Labor hold | | Swing | +3.0 | |

=== Elections in the 1940s ===
==== 1949 ====
1949 Australian federal election: Wills
| Party | Candidate | Votes | % | ±% |
|---|---|---|---|---|
| Labor | Bill Bryson | 18,918 | 44.2 | +0.7 |
| Liberal | Allan Tyrer | 15,101 | 35.3 | +3.3 |
| Blackburn-Mutton Labor | Doris Blackburn | 8,801 | 20.6 | −2.7 |
| Total formal votes | | 42,820 | 98.6 | |
| Informal votes | | 613 | 1.4 | |
| Turnout | | 43,433 | 96.4 | |
Two-party-preferred result
| Labor | Bill Bryson | 25,162 | 58.8 | −2.7 |
| Liberal | Allan Tyrer | 17,658 | 41.2 | +2.7 |
| Labor notional hold | | Swing | −2.7 | |
