= Sykes v Cleary =

1992 High Court of Australia case

- Court: High Court of Australia as the Court of Disputed Returns
- Decided: 25 November 1992
- Citations: [1992] HCA 60, (1992) 176 CLR 77

Case history
- Prior actions: Sykes v Cleary [1992] HCA 32, (1992) 107 ALR 577; (1992) 66 ALJR 577

Court membership
- Judges sitting: Mason CJ, Brennan, Deane, Dawson, Toohey, Gaudron & McHugh JJ

Case opinions
- 6:1 A teacher employed by a State held an "office of profit under the Crown" within the meaning of s 44(iv) and so was "incapable of being chosen" . 5:2 A dual citizen will be disqualified unless they have taken all reasonable steps to renounce the other citizenship.

Sykes v Cleary (Note: The Case Stated (by Dawson J), and then the individual judgments, are separately paragraph-numbered.) was a significant decision of the High Court of Australia sitting as the Court of Disputed Returns on 25 November 1992. The case was a leading decision on Section 44 of the Constitution of Australia, dealing with both what constitutes an office of profit under the Crown and allegiance to a foreign power. The majority held that a teacher employed by the State of Victoria held an "office of profit under the Crown" within the meaning of s 44(iv) and so was "incapable of being chosen". A person who held dual citizenship was incapable of being chosen unless they had taken all reasonable steps to renounce the other citizenship.

== Background ==
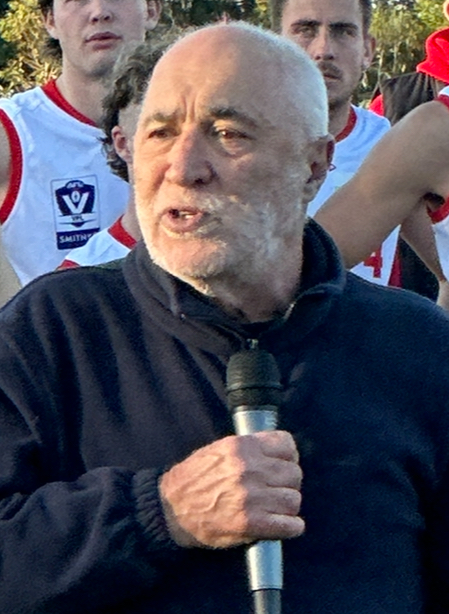
Phil Cleary

The former Labor Party Prime Minister Bob Hawke had resigned as the member for Wills in 1992. Independent candidate Phil Cleary was declared elected in the 1992 by-election; he had the highest first-preference vote, (Note: Cleary 21,391; Delacretaz 17,582; Kardamitsis 18,784; Sykes 364 (and 17 other candidates).) and an absolute majority of the votes after an initial distribution of preferences. (Note: Cleary 41,708; Kardamitsis 21,772 (of 63,801 valid votes).) Another candidate, Ian Sykes, challenged the result in the High Court, sitting as the Court of Disputed Returns. If Cleary were to be excluded, on a recount the seat would most likely go to the Labor candidate Bill Kardamitsis or the Liberal candidate John Delacretaz, so Sykes challenged them too. (Note: A further candidate was also challenged, but no argument was presented. Sykes himself had obtained very few votes, so had a negligible chance of being declared elected.) Sykes claimed that Cleary was disqualified by Constitution s 44(iv) and the others by s 44(i). The Court upheld Sykes's claims and declared the election void. No by-election was held, owing to the imminence of a general election. In the general election of 1993, Cleary and Kardamitsis stood again for Wills and Cleary was elected.

=== Facts ===
Cleary was a secondary school teacher, in the Victorian public school system, employed on a permanent and full-time basis. He had taken leave without pay to campaign for the election and intended to resign if elected.

Kardamitsis had been born in Greece as a Greek citizen and Delacretaz in Switzerland as a Swiss citizen. They migrated to Australia and became Australian citizens. Kardamitsis was born in Greece in 1952, migrated to Australia in 1969 and was naturalised in 1975; Delacretaz was born in Switzerland in 1923, migrated to Australia in 1951 and was naturalised in 1960. They had maintained no legally relevant contacts with their former countries. They had become naturalised as Australian citizens at times when that required renunciation of all other allegiances and appear to have assumed this precluded dual citizenship. They had not applied to their former countries to proactively renounce any such citizenships, although the law of each country permitted renunciation.

== Judgment ==
=== Office of profit under the Crown: s 44(iv) ===
The Court decided by a 6:1 majority that Cleary held an "office of profit under the Crown" within the meaning of s 44(iv) and so had been "incapable of being chosen".

Mason CJ, Toohey and McHugh JJ held in a joint judgment (with which Brennan, Dawson and Gaudron JJ generally agreed) that the centuries-old phrase "office of profit under the Crown" includes today not only public servants as ordinarily understood, but extends to "at least those persons who are permanently employed by government". it was found persuasive, although not conclusive, that Cleary's position was statutorily defined as that of an "officer".

The reasons behind s 44(iv), so far as it concerns public servants, were said to derive from traditions of the British House of Commons: that a public servant could not simultaneously attend adequately to both the duties of a public servant and those of a member of the Parliament, and also could be subject to the opinions of the minister to whom they were responsible; this situation would impinge on both the independence of members of the Parliament and the maintenance of a "politically neutral public service". That neutrality also requires public servants to refrain from "active and public participation in party politics". These reasons apply to a public servant who is a permanent teacher, even though (it was accepted) "a teacher is not an instance of the archetypical public servant at whom the disqualification was primarily aimed".

It did not matter that Cleary was employed by "the Crown" in right of the State of Victoria and not in right of the Commonwealth; since the exception to s 44(iv) includes ministers of a State, s 44(iv) itself must include State officers. Nor that Cleary had been on leave without pay to contest the election; he continued to occupy the position.

It did not matter, either, that Cleary had resigned from his position on hearing the outcome of the distribution of preferences and before the result was declared. The words "being chosen" were held to refer to a process of choice, which begins on the polling day. More fully, "incapable of being chosen" extends back to nomination. The process does not include the" declaration of the poll, which is only "the announcement of the choice made".

Deane J dissented, holding that Cleary had not been "incapable of being chosen" and been validly elected. In Deane's view, it is sufficient if the candidate is qualified at the moment when the result of the poll is declared, by which point Cleary had resigned from his position. Deane was concerned that to require candidates always to be qualified at the point of nomination deters the more than ten per cent (at that time) of the workforce who are employed in the public service of the Commonwealth or a State. He thought that taking leave without pay or other emoluments, intending to resign if electoral success became apparent, is "preferable [...] to the rather devious procedure of an ostensible termination of employment" under a guarantee of reinstatement if not elected, as has been established by Commonwealth and State legislation.

==== Consequences of disqualification ====
It was argued on behalf of Kardamitsis that, if Cleary was disqualified, there should be a "special count" in which his preferences would be distributed and another candidate declared elected. But the Court thought that omitting Cleary from the field of candidates could distort the voters' "real intentions".

The majority held that, for those reasons, the whole election was void.

=== Allegiance to a foreign power: s 44(i) ===
Because the Court held that the by-election was void because Cleary held an office of profit under the crown, it was unnecessary for the Court to decide the challenge to the eligibility of other candidates under s 44(i). The Court chose however to consider their eligibility as Kardamitsis and Delacretaz might wish to stand in the next election. The majority of 5:2 held that they were disqualified by s 44(i).

Mason CJ, Toohey and McHugh JJ held that both Kardamitsis and Delacretaz were still, in the words of s 44(i), "a subject or a citizen or entitled to the rights or privileges of a subject or a citizen of a foreign power", those rights and privileges being determined by that country's law. The wording of s 44(i) rendered applicable, but not conclusive, the test in international law of "real and effective nationality", which could particularly have benefited Kardamitsis; the judgment listed his extensive participation in Australian public life, involving repeated oaths of Australian allegiance as a local councillor and a justice of the peace. Kardamitsis and Delacretaz might have benefited from that test if they had "taken reasonable steps" to renounce the foreign citizenship. They explained:

What amounts to the taking of reasonable steps to renounce foreign nationality must depend upon the circumstances of the particular case. What is reasonable will turn on the situation of the individual, the requirements of the foreign law and the extent of the connection between the individual and the foreign State of which he or she is alleged to be a subject or citizen. And it is relevant to bear in mind that a person who has participated in an Australian naturalization ceremony in which he or she has expressly renounced his or her foreign allegiance may well believe that, by becoming an Australian citizen, he or she has effectively renounced any foreign nationality.

However, neither Kardamitsis nor Delacretaz had taken any steps of renunciation.

Brennan and Dawson JJ agreed, with Brennan J adding that, if formal steps of renunciation or other release are available, they must be taken: "It is not sufficient [...] to make a unilateral declaration when some further step can reasonably be taken". Brennan J also analysed s 44(i) into three "categories of disqualification": (1) an act of acknowledgement of duty to the foreign power; (2) duty "reciprocal to" the status of subject or citizen under the law of that power; and (3) duty "reciprocal to" the rights or privileges conferred by the law of that power.

On these grounds, the majority decided that Kardamitsis and Delacretaz had been "incapable of being chosen". (The judgments showed them that they would have to make formal renunciation applications to their former homelands if they wished to stand for election again.)

Deane and Gaudron JJ dissented. Deane J found the "mental element" of the acknowledgement also in the second category or "limb":

The first limb of the sub-section (i.e. "is under any acknowledgment of allegiance, obedience, or adherence to a foreign power") involves an element of acceptance or at least acquiescence on the part of the relevant person. [...] In conformity with the purpose of the sub-section, the second limb (i.e. "is a subject or a citizen or entitled to the rights or privileges of a subject or citizen of a foreign power") should, in my view, be construed as impliedly containing a similar mental element with the result that it applies only to cases where the relevant status, rights or privileges have been sought, accepted, asserted or acquiesced in by the person concerned. The effect of that construction of the sub-section is that an Australian-born citizen is not disqualified by reason of the second limb of s.44(i) unless he or she has established, asserted, accepted, or acquiesced in, the relevant relationship with the foreign power. The position is more difficult in a case such as the present where the relationship with the foreign power existed before the acquisition (or re-acquisition) of Australian citizenship. In such a case, what will be involved is not the acquisition or establishment, for the purposes of s.44, of the relevant relationship with the foreign power but the relinquishment or extinguishment of it. It does, however, seem to me that the purpose which s.44 seeks to attain and which "must always be kept in mind" [In re Webster (1975)] would not have included the permanent exclusion from participation at the highest level in the political life of the nation of any Australian citizen whose origins lay in, or who has had some past association with, some foreign country which asserts an entitlement to refuse to allow or recognize his or her genuine and unconditional renunciation of past allegiance or citizenship. Accordingly, and notwithstanding that citizenship of a country is ordinarily a matter determined by the law of that country [...], the qualifying element which must be read into the second limb of s.44(i) extends not only to the acquisition of the disqualifying relationship by a person who is already an Australian citizen but also to the retention of that relationship by a person who has subsequently become an Australian citizen. A person who becomes an Australian citizen will not be within the second limb of s.44(i) if he or she has done all that can reasonably be expected of him or her to extinguish any former relationship with a foreign country to the extent that it involves the status, rights or privileges referred to in the sub-section.

Deane J then focussed on the statutory oath of Australian allegiance and its (former) inclusion of a renunciation of all other allegiances. (Note: Renunciation was included in the oath in 1966 and removed in 1986.) He understood this not only as a declaration by the migrant but also as "a clear representation by the Australian Government and people" that, for the purposes of Australian law, there had been a "final severing" of all other ties of nationality and a compliance with all requirements to become "a full and equal member of this nation". It would be inconsistent with that oath, for the new citizen to then apply to the foreign country to renounce its citizenship, thereby asserting the continuing existence of that citizenship and, as a citizen of that country, submitting to the discretion of its responsible minister. In Deane's view—although their circumstances differed and it would have been better if Delacretaz had exercised his automatic entitlement to renunciation—both Kardamitsis and Delacretaz had done "all that could reasonably be expected", for Australian purposes, to divest themselves of foreign nationality.

Gaudron J came to the same conclusion as Deane J although by a different route. She was unwilling to suppose that "the Parliament intended that the formal renunciation of all other allegiance, notwithstanding that it was solemnly sworn or affirmed, should be entirely devoid of legal effect". As to what that effect would be, in her view "the solution is not to be found in reading down s.44(i): rather, it lies in examination of the circumstances in which foreign law should be applied to determine questions arising under the subsection". Thus Kardamitsis' oath and renunciation should be respected and Greek law would come into the picture only if he had somehow reasserted Greek nationality—and he had not. Gaudron J observed that, when Delacretaz had taken the oath, it did not yet contain renunciation, but he had renounced all other nationality at an earlier stage of the naturalisation process. He should not then be expected to have approached Swiss authorities to relieve him of a citizenship that he had already renounced effectively for Australian purposes. Nor had he done anything to reassert Swiss nationality.

In the view of Deane and Gaudron JJ, Kardamitsis and Delacretaz had effectively renounced their foreign citizenships, long before the election, and so were not "incapable of being chosen".

Since renunciation procedures were available to both Kardamitsis and Delacretaz and they had not used them, the Court did not have to consider the situations where no such procedures are effectively available, either because renunciation is simply not permitted or because the country's authorities have refused to exercise a discretion to allow renunciation. However, Dawson J thought that in the first situation the candidate would not be precluded from election, there being "obviously no steps, save for unilateral renunciation, which that person can reasonably take", and in the second situation "need not necessarily" be precluded.
