= 1992 Wills by-election =

Australian federal by-election

- 11 April 1992

Division of Wills (Vic) in the Australian House of Representatives
- Turnout: 89.4% (▼4.9)
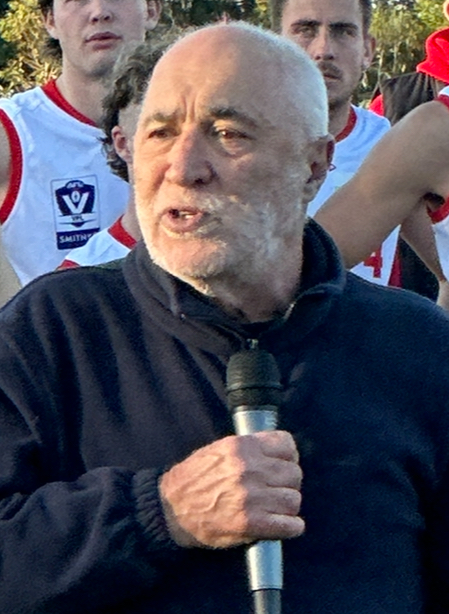

| | First party | Second party | Third party |
|---|---|---|---|
| Candidate | Phil Cleary | Bill Kardamitsis | John Delacretaz |
| Party | Independent | Labor | Liberal |
| Primary vote | 21,391 | 18,784 | 17,582 |
| Percentage | 33.5% | 29.4% | 27.9% |
| Swing | ▲33.5 | ▼19.3 | ▼6.9 |
| 2PP | 65.7% | 34.3% |
| 2PP swing | ▲65.7 | ▼23.6 |
MP before election
Bob Hawke
Labor
Elected MP
Phil Cleary
Independent

The 1992 Wills by-election was held on 11 April 1992 to elect the member for Wills in the Australian House of Representatives, following the resignation of Labor Party MP and former Prime Minister Bob Hawke.

The by-election was won by independent candidate Phil Cleary. There were 22 candidates, the largest number ever to contest any House of Representatives seat. Though 22 candidates contested the 2009 Bradfield by-election, nine of the candidates were from the Christian Democratic Party.

Cleary's election was declared void by the High Court on the grounds that, as a teacher employed by the Victorian state government, he held an office of profit under the Crown at the time he nominated. No second by-election was held due to the imminence of the 1993 federal election.

== Results ==
Wills by-election, 1992
| Party | Candidate | Votes | % | ±% |
|---|---|---|---|---|
| Independent | Phil Cleary | 21,391 | 33.5 | +33.5 |
| Labor | Bill Kardamitsis | 18,784 | 29.4 | −19.3 |
| Liberal | John Delacretaz | 17,582 | 27.6 | −6.9 |
| Independent | Katheryne Savage | 1,660 | 2.6 | +2.6 |
| Democrats | David Mackay | 1,383 | 2.2 | −7.4 |
| AAFI | Angela Walker | 577 | 0.9 | +0.9 |
| Independent | Geraldine Rawson | 453 | 0.7 | +0.7 |
| Independent | Ian Sykes | 364 | 0.6 | −0.9 |
| Federal | Stan Germaine | 280 | 0.4 | +0.4 |
| Imperial British | Cecil G. Murgatroyd | 258 | 0.4 | −0.1 |
| Independent | Salvatore Ferraro | 221 | 0.4 | +0.4 |
| Independent | Bob Lewis | 216 | 0.3 | +0.3 |
| Socialist Labour League | Richard Phillips | 136 | 0.2 | +0.2 |
| Independent | Bill French | 90 | 0.1 | +0.1 |
| Independent | Kon Kyrou | 81 | 0.1 | +0.1 |
| Independent | Julien Droulers | 68 | 0.1 | +0.1 |
| | Patricia Poulos | 61 | 0.1 | +0.1 |
| Independent | John Murray | 54 | 0.1 | +0.1 |
| Independent | Chris Vassis | 43 | 0.1 | +0.1 |
| Republican | Otto Kuhne | 35 | 0.1 | +0.1 |
| Independent | Will Kapphan | 34 | 0.1 | +0.1 |
| Independent | Felicia Potter | 30 | 0.1 | +0.1 |
| Total formal votes | | 63,801 | 93.6 | +0.00 |
| Informal votes | | 4,348 | 6.4 | +0.00 |
| Turnout | | 68,149 | 89.4 | −4.9 |
Two-party-preferred result
| Labor | Bill Kardamitis | 40,416 | 63.8 | +5.9 |
| Liberal | John Delacretaz | 22,942 | 36.2 | −5.9 |
Two-candidate-preferred result
| Independent | Phil Cleary | 41,708 | 65.7 | +65.7 |
| Labor | Bill Kardamitsis | 21,772 | 34.3 | −23.6 |
| Independent gain from Labor | | | | |

== See also ==
- Electoral results for the Division of Wills
- List of Australian federal by-elections
- Sykes v Cleary – 1992 High Court of Australia case
