= Bob Hawke College =

High school in Perth, Western Australia

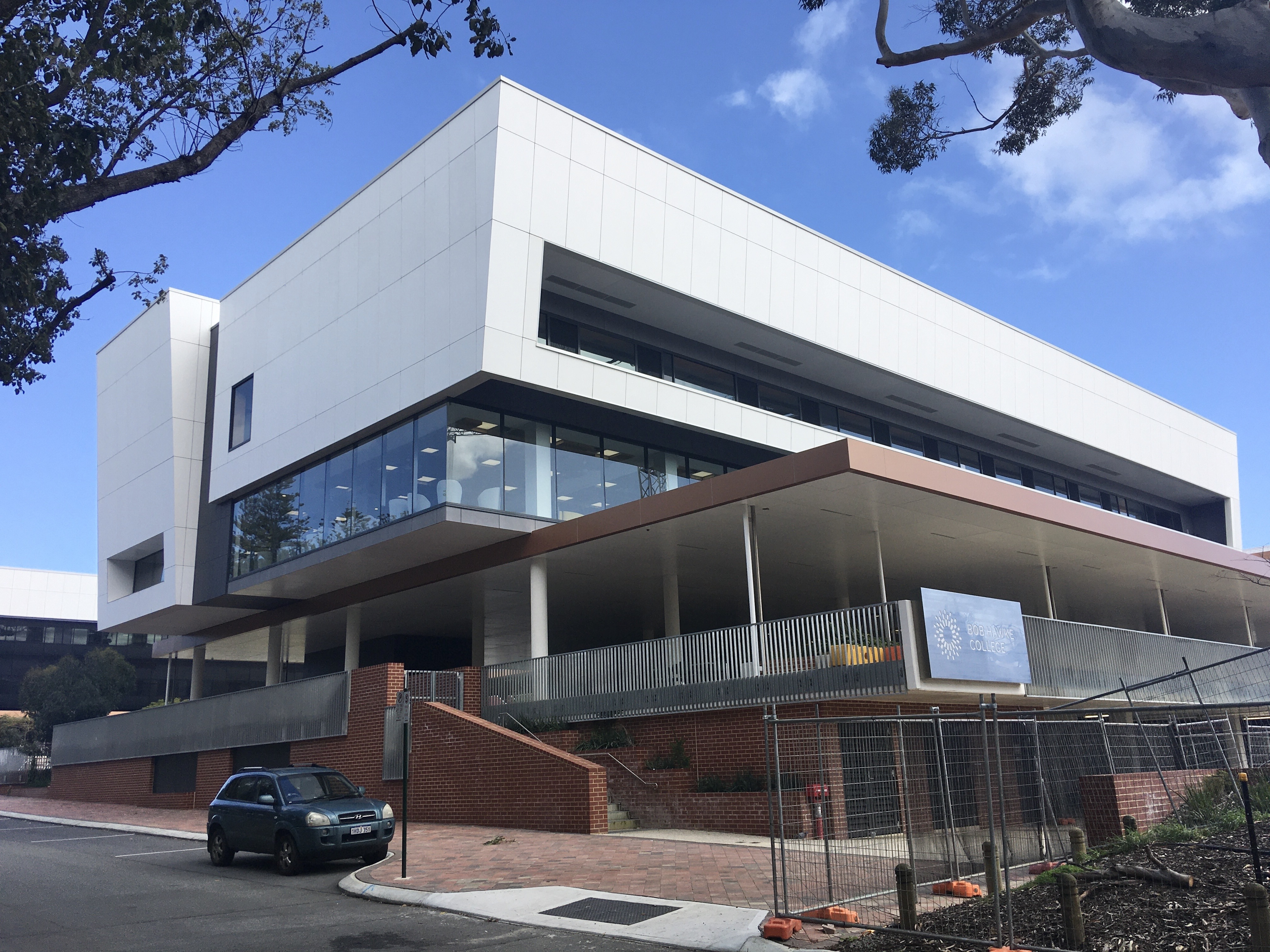
- Bob Hawke College in August 2021

Location
- Subiaco, Perth, Western Australia; Australia; 31°56′40″S 115°49′57″E

Information
- Other name: Inner City College
- Type: Public co-educational partially selective high school
- Motto: Extraordinary Together
- Established: 2020
- School code: 4213
- Principal: Rohan Smith
- Years: 7–12
- Enrolment: 2,000 (2025 estimate)
- Campus type: Urban
- Website: bobhawkecollege.wa.edu.au

Bob Hawke College is a public high school in the state of Western Australia, Australia and situated in the suburb of Subiaco. The school opened on 3 February 2020 with 250 Year 7 students, and has expanded to around 2,100 students from Years 7 to 12 in 2026.

The school integrates the playing surface of the former Subiaco Oval stadium, which was demolished in December 2019, into its campus. The refurbished oval was open to students in May 2020, and to the general public the following month.

== History ==
In 2017, the government of Western Australia proposed to move students from Perth Modern School to a new high-rise building in the Perth central business district. This proposal was opposed by many members of the Perth Modern School community. On 13 June 2017, the plan was changed to instead build a new school at Mueller Park, which is close to Perth Modern School. The college was expected to take pressure off Churchlands Senior High School, Mount Lawley Senior High School, Shenton College and Dianella Secondary College. During its planning and early construction, the college was known as Inner City College. After the death of Bob Hawke in May 2019, the school was confirmed to be named in honour of him.

At the start of 2024, the "Stage 2" building of the college was completed. The new four- storey campus includes a rooftop terrace and a concrete theatre. Costing $53.9 million, the campus doubled the school's capacity to 2,000 students, housing new classrooms for the performing arts, languages, and music. Two new media suites, engineering workshops, and a fitness centre were also built as part of Stage 2.
