= Mueller Park =

Park in Perth, Western Australia

Coordinates: 31.9446°S 115.8344°E

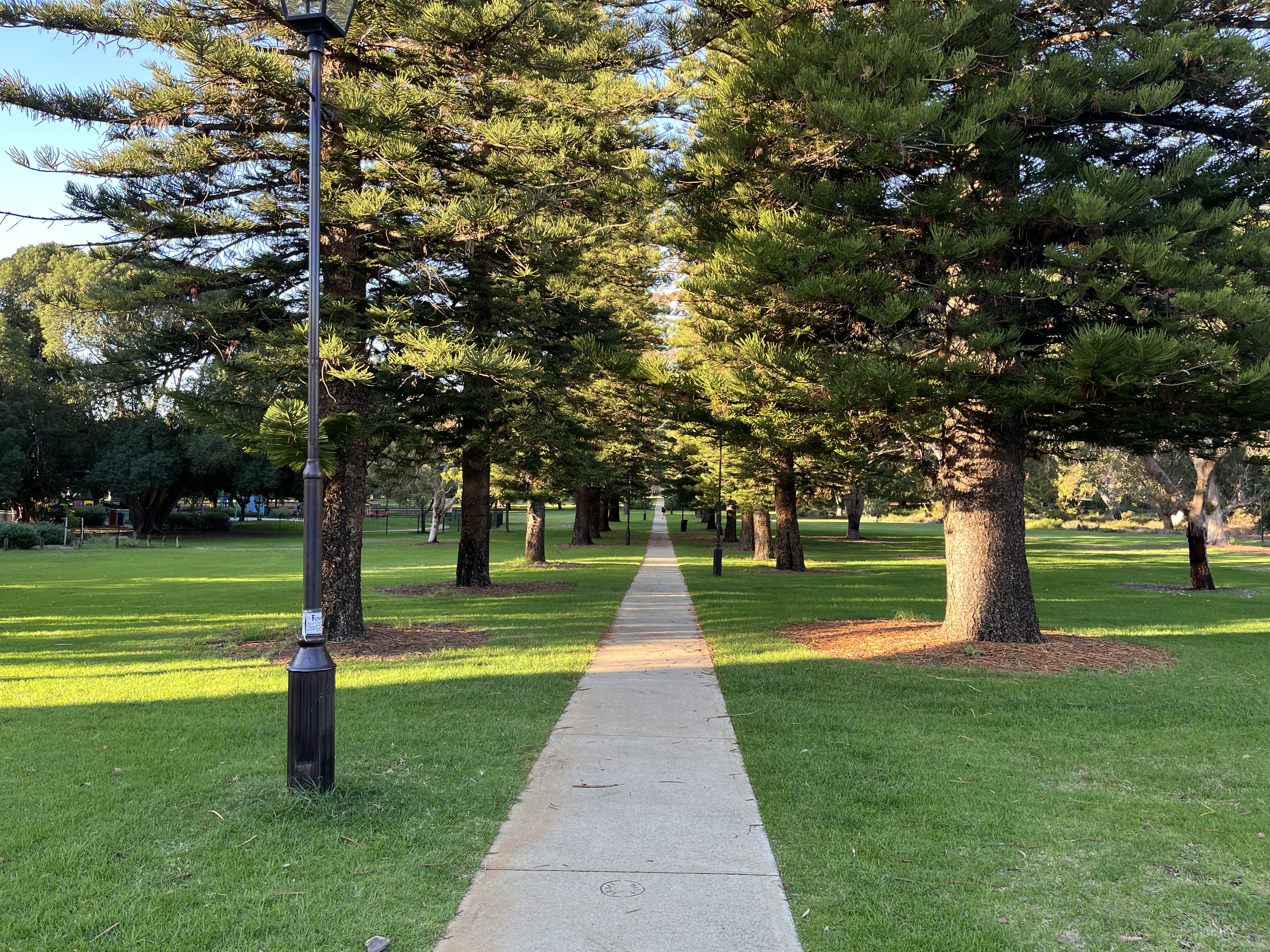
Mueller Park in May 2025

Mueller Park or Müller Park (German: [ˈmʏlɐ] MULL-er), formerly known as Kitchener Park, is a park in Subiaco, Western Australia, situated next to Bob Hawke College between Perth Modern School and Subiaco Oval. It originally comprised the land area which included Subiaco Oval and in the early 1900s housed tennis, croquet, bowls, cricket and football clubs.

== History ==
The park is named after German-Australian botanist Ferdinand von Mueller who described several hundred species of Australian flora and who participated in and promoted the exploration of Australia in the mid-nineteenth century. The Subiaco Municipal Council announced the name in July 1906.

In December 1916 the park was renamed Kitchener Park in response to war-time sensitivities. Present day Roberts Road and Winthrop Avenue (Nedlands) were renamed from Mueller Road and Ferdinand Street respectively at the same time. The park currently comprises 4.3 hectares (11 acres).

In 1981 the park was renamed back to its original name when the two-tier stand redevelopment of Subiaco Oval was completed.
