= Cecil G. Murgatroyd =

Australian politician and comedian (1958–2001)

Cecil Godfrey Murgatroyd
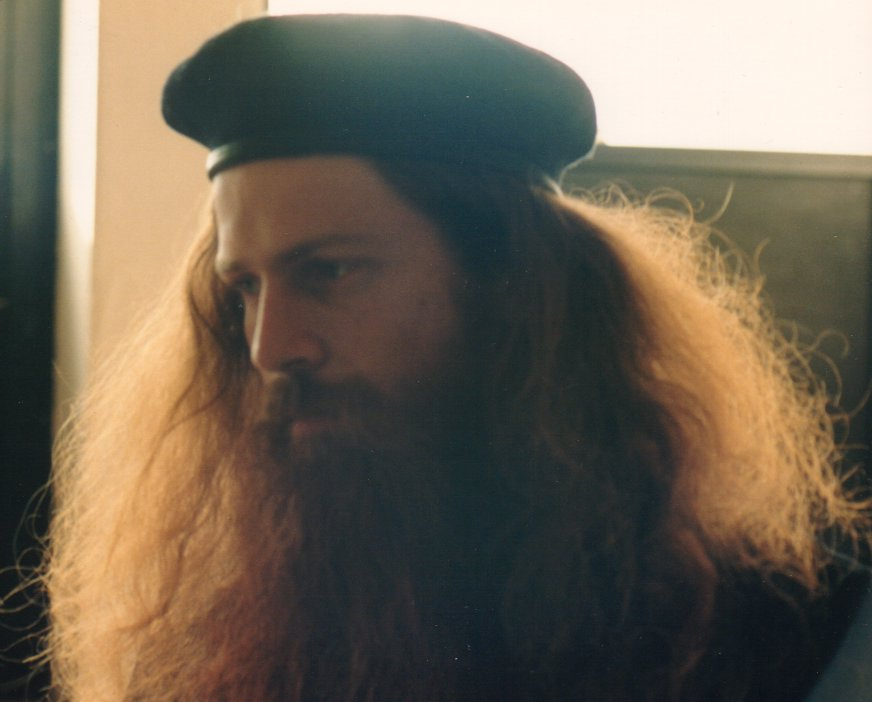
- Cecil G. Murgatroyd
- Born: Cecil Godfrey Murgatroyd; 22 May 1958; Ōpōtiki, New Zealand
- Died: 21 May 2001 (aged 42); Melbourne, Australia
- Occupations: Australian Politician, Musician, Comedian
- Spouse: Paula Ferrari (nee Cahill)
- Parent(s): Lewis Stanmore Collins and Kathleen Mary McFarlane Lennan

Cecil Godfrey Murgatroyd (22 May 1958 – 21 May 2001) was originally born Jeffrey David Collins, but changed his name to Cecil Godfrey Murgatroyd aged 21, in order to pursue his satirical political career without causing embarrassment to his devoted parents, Lew and Kath Collins. He was a great believer in the concept of “Juniority”, so when his 2-year-old nephew pronounced his name as “Cec” (not “Jeff”), he believed the toddler must be correct, which is how he became Cecil. Godfrey is a version of Jeffrey. His friends at the time chose Murgatroyd. He was born in Ōpōtiki, New Zealand but immigrated to Australia and became an Australian Citizen specifically to run against the sitting Prime Minister at the time, Bob Hawke. Bob Hawke inspired the name of his rock band “The Other Wankers”. When Bob Hawke was asked his opinion of Murgatroyd, he replied “arrrrr the wanker”. He was a talented musician, and comedian. He was known for being involved in New Zealand National Politics along with Australian Federal and State Politics, and for his role in the 1998 Australian Constitutional Convention. From 1981 until his death in 2001, he was generally associated with running and standing as a candidate for two non-serious parties: the Imperial British Conservative Party (IBCP) and the McGillicuddy Serious Party (McGSP); which operated in both countries. Murgatroyd's platforms were typically absurdist and of a 'pataphysical' nature.

Murgatroyd was initially active in New Zealand politics in the early 1980s as a candidate for the (then) Wizard of Christchurch's IBCP and as the founder of the Waikato Cavalry Regiment of Alf's Imperial Army in the city of Hamilton. In the 1981 election, he stood in the Waipa electorate for the Wizard or IBC party and came fourth with 125 votes.

In 1982 he moved to Melbourne, where he set up the Australian headquarters of the McGillicuddy Serious Party in 1984. After his move to Australia, he stood against, among others, Prime Minister Bob Hawke in two federal elections in the 1980s and 1990s. Bob Hawke likened him to the rear end of a donkey. He often returned to New Zealand to contest parliamentary elections, using tactics he described as being designed for "making elections interesting." In 1990 the McGillicuddy Serious Party invited him back to New Zealand to contest the seat of Christchurch North against New Zealand Prime Minister Mike Moore. In this campaign, he described himself as the McGSP's "Prime Ministerial specialist" due to his experience in Australia. Murgatroyd's aim in life was to be the first ever election candidate not to collect even one single vote, a record he hoped to achieve upon his return to New Zealand.

Murgatroyd was also involved in the Australian Constitutional Convention, being a candidate under the ticket "Queen Anne of Australia".

In his campaign as a candidate in the 1998 Victorian state election, Murgatroyd described himself as "a holy Prophet for the Senate". He proposed that new migrants would have to pass batting, bowling and fielding tests to assess their cricket skills, to improve Australia's future sporting prospects. He was diagnosed with cancer of the Bile Duct in 1999 and died in 2001 in Melbourne.

== The Other Wankers ==
Murgatroyd was a musician, and a comedian, composing his own lyrics to parodies of popular tunes and delighting audiences on university campuses where he performed for O-Week and other occasions.

In 1988 he teamed up with drummer Steve Danko and bass guitarist Bruce Armstrong to form The Other Wankers, a band devoted to promoting Sexual Self-Satisfaction, ostensibly as a way of combating AIDS. This project included the sale of T-shirts with TOW logos, badges bearing slogans such as "stay a virgin" and "get a grip", "pirate quality recordings" on cassette (sold in plain brown wrappers), and the Wank Art Colouring Book, a crudely produced A4-size booklet of clumsy pornographic line drawings by visual artist E. M. Christensen.

Murgatroyd's one great regret was that he never made a professional-quality recording of his music, and, although there are photographs of him in his many different guises, very little video footage of his performances survives.
