= Phil Cleary =

Australian rules footballer and politician (born 1952)

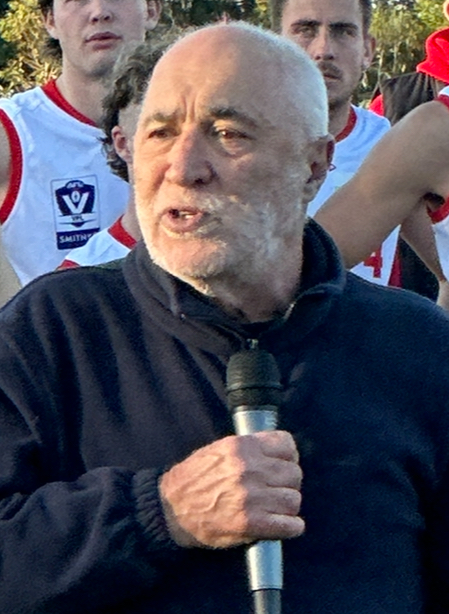

Member of the Australian Parliament for Wills
- In office 11 April 1992 – 25 November 1992; 13 March 1993 – 2 March 1996
- Preceded by: Bob Hawke
- Succeeded by: Kelvin Thomson

Personal details
- Born: Philip Ronald Cleary; 8 December 1952 (age 73) Melbourne, Victoria, Australia
- Party: Independent
- Other political affiliations: Phil Cleary Means Business (2016); Voice for the West (2014); Independent Australia (1998–2003)
- Occupation: Teacher
Australian rules football career
Personal information
- Position: Forward
Playing career
Years	Club	Games (Goals)
1975–1987	Coburg	205 (318)

Philip Ronald Cleary (born 8 December 1952) is an Australian political and sport commentator. He is a former Australian rules footballer who played 205 games at the Coburg Football Club, before serving as the member for Wills in the House of Representatives from 1992 until 1996.

== Football career ==
Cleary began his playing career at the Coburg Amateurs Football Club in the Victorian Amateur Football Association (VAFA) in the early 1970s. He wore number 1 at the club for the 1973 season.

He first came to notice as a prominent player and coach in Victoria's second-level Australian rules football competition, the Victorian Football Association (VFA), for the Coburg Football Club. He debuted with the club in 1975, playing in the reserves premiersip later that season.

Cleary went onto play 205 games — second only to Dave Starbuck in Coburg history — and kick 317 goals. He was a member of the 1979 premiership side and losing 1980 side. He coached the club between 1984 and 1992 (captain coach between 1984 and 1987, upon which he retired as a player), before leading them to back-to-back premierships in 1988–89.

In the 1986 VFA grand final against Williamstown, he was sensationally ordered off, only to be found not guilty at the tribunal. He coached the VFA representative side on five occasions without losing a game. He was one of the most well-known players in the VFA in his era, and was instantly recognisable from the thick beard he wore throughout his career.

He has had various coaching and mentoring roles in the Essendon District Football League, including at the West Coburg Football Club, where he coached the under-16s team to a premiership in 2008 and the under-18s team to a premiership in 2010. The latter side included future AFL players Brandon Ellis and Adam Saad.

== Political career ==
At the Wills by-election of 11 April 1992, caused by the resignation of former Prime Minister Bob Hawke, Phil Cleary was elected as an independent to the Australian House of Representatives from a field of 22 candidates, becoming the only non-Labor member to have ever held the seat. However, his election was successfully challenged in the High Court and declared void on 25 November, as Cleary was on unpaid leave from the Victorian Education Department, and the Section 44 of the Constitution of Australia forbids people employed by the Crown from standing for election. A second by-election was not held, as a general election was expected within a few months. At the 1993 Australian federal election, Cleary again stood as a candidate and was elected for a second time.

Cleary lost the seat to Labor at the 1996 federal election. Wills had undergone a redistribution, by adding territory to the division, which weakened Cleary's notional position against Labor. Cleary's vote of 22.7% was a decrease of 6.7% from the 29.4% he polled in 1993, on different boundaries.

While advocating an Australian Republic, he broke with the Australian Republican Movement (ARM) over disagreement about how the President of Australia should be chosen, forming a group called "Real Republic", which advocated direct election of the President as opposed to the model advocated by Malcolm Turnbull of the ARM, under which the President would be chosen by a joint sitting of the Parliament, and which was the model proposed in the 1999 referendum.

== Post-parliament ==
Cleary was a part of the ABC's telecast of VFA/VFL football as a match-day commentator from 1987 until the ABC lost the rights in 2014, juggling coaching and commentary duties for the first five seasons. He conducted interviews and acted as a boundary rider for the match of the day, writes a weekly column for the football magazine Inside Football, and regularly appears in the media on a range of social and political issues.

He has campaigned to stop male violence against women since his sister was murdered by her former partner in 1987.

He is a freelance journalist and public speaker and is the author of three books: Cleary Independent, Just Another Little Murder, and Getting Away with Murder.

Cleary contested the seat of Brunswick at the 2010 Victorian state election as an independent.

=== Defamation ===
In his 2005 book Getting Away with Murder, Cleary accused barrister Dyson Hore-Lacy of helping a man who killed his own wife to manufacture a provocation defence. In 2010, Hore-Lacy sued Cleary for defamation, won the case, and was awarded $630,000 in damages.

== Bibliography ==
- Cleary, P. 1998, Cleary Independent, HarperCollins Publishers. ISBN 9780732259259
- Cleary, P. 2003, Just Another Little Murder, Allen & Unwin. ISBN 9781865087894
- Cleary, P. 2005, Getting Away With Murder: The True Story of Julie Ramage's Death, Allen & Unwin. ISBN 9781741146912

Parliament of Australia
Preceded by Bob Hawke	Member for Wills; 1992–1996	Succeeded by Kelvin Thomson
