= The Federal Party of Australia =

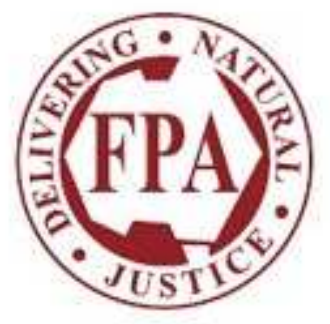
- Abbreviation: FPA
- President: Garth Eaton (after August 1988)
- Founder: Brian Axelby; Garth Eaton; Keith Horsley
- Founded: 5 May 1988
- Registered: 4 November 1991
- Dissolved: c. 2019
- Preceded by: Political Reformation; Council of Australia
- Headquarters: Brisbane, Qld (1988−2003); Townsville, Qld (2003−2019)
- Youth wing: Young Federals Movement
- Slogan: "Delivering Natural Justice"

The Federal Party of Australia (FPA), also known simply as the Federals, was an Australian political party based in Queensland.

The party was founded in May 1988 as a successor to the Political Reformation Council of Australia. It was registered with the Australian Electoral Commission in November 1991. Their first candidate was Stan Germaine, who received 280 votes at the 1992 Wills by-election.

The FPA was deregistered on 6 February 1997 after failing to endorse candidates at elections for four years. The party initially remained active, including a plan to contest the 2019 federal election which did not eventuate, but faded away soon after.

Policies included introducing optional preferential voting for elections in the House of Representatives (replacing compulsory preferential voting).
