= Bob Hawke =

Prime Minister of Australia from 1983 to 1991

The Honourable Bob Hawke AC GCL
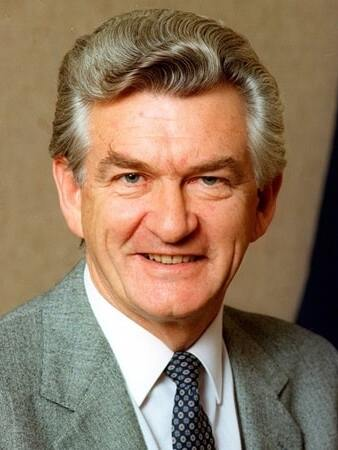
- Official portrait, 1983

23rd Prime Minister of Australia
- In office 11 March 1983 – 20 December 1991
- Monarch: Elizabeth II
- Governors-General: Sir Ninian Stephen; Bill Hayden
- Deputy: Lionel Bowen; Paul Keating; Brian Howe
- Preceded by: Malcolm Fraser
- Succeeded by: Paul Keating

13th Leader of the Labor Party
- In office 8 February 1983 – 19 December 1991
- Deputy: Lionel Bowen; Paul Keating; Brian Howe
- Preceded by: Bill Hayden
- Succeeded by: Paul Keating

Leader of the Opposition
- In office 8 February 1983 – 11 March 1983
- Prime Minister: Malcolm Fraser
- Deputy: Lionel Bowen
- Preceded by: Bill Hayden
- Succeeded by: Andrew Peacock

Member of the Australian Parliament for Wills
- In office 18 October 1980 – 20 February 1992
- Preceded by: Gordon Bryant
- Succeeded by: Phil Cleary

National President of the Labor Party
- In office 7 June 1973 – 2 August 1978
- Preceded by: Tom Burns
- Succeeded by: Neil Batt

National President of the Australian Council of Trade Unions
- In office 10 September 1969 – 1 September 1980
- Preceded by: Albert Monk
- Succeeded by: Cliff Dolan

Personal details
- Born: Robert James Lee Hawke; 9 December 1929 Border Town, South Australia, Australia
- Died: 16 May 2019 (aged 89) Northbridge, New South Wales, Australia
- Resting place: Macquarie Park Cemetery and Crematorium, Sydney, New South Wales, Australia
- Party: Labor
- Spouses: Hazel Masterson (m. 1956; div. 1994); Blanche d'Alpuget (m. 1995)
- Children: 4
- Parents: Clem Hawke (father); Edith Lee (mother)
- Relatives: Bert Hawke (uncle)
- Education: University of Western Australia (BA, LLB); University College, Oxford (BLitt); Australian National University (PhD, not completed)
- Occupation: Politician; trade unionist
- Website: Bob Hawke Prime Ministerial Library
- Bob Hawke's voice Hawke speaking after a meeting with U.S. President Ronald Reagan; 23 June 1988

Robert James Lee Hawke (9 December 1929 – 16 May 2019) was the 23rd prime minister of Australia, serving from 1983 to 1991. He held office as leader of the Australian Labor Party (ALP), having previously served as president of the Australian Council of Trade Unions from 1969 to 1980 and as president of the Labor Party national executive from 1973 to 1978.

Hawke was born in Border Town, South Australia. (Note: Spelt "Border Town" until 1979) He attended the University of Western Australia and went on to study at University College, Oxford as a Rhodes Scholar. In 1956, Hawke joined the Australian Council of Trade Unions (ACTU) as a research officer. Having risen to become responsible for national wage case arbitration, he was elected as president of the ACTU in 1969, where he achieved a high public profile. In 1973, he was appointed as president of the Labor Party.

In 1980, Hawke stood down from his roles as ACTU and Labor Party president to announce his intention to enter parliamentary politics, and was subsequently elected to the Australian House of Representatives as a member of parliament (MP) for the division of Wills at the 1980 federal election. Three years later, he was elected unopposed to replace Bill Hayden as leader of the Australian Labor Party, and within five weeks led Labor to a landslide victory at the 1983 election, and was sworn in as prime minister. He led Labor to victory a further three times, with successful outcomes in 1984, 1987 and 1990 elections, making him the most electorally successful prime minister in the history of the Labor Party.

The Hawke government oversaw one of the largest overhauls of Australia's political economy in its history. A defining feature of the Hawke term was the close co-operation between business, the government and trade unions via conferences such as the national economic summit, the tax summit and the accord.

Key reforms implemented by the Hawke government included widespread deregulation, dramatic cuts to tariffs as well as business subsidies, the introduction of universal healthcare under Medicare, increased federal expenditure on education, creating APEC, floating the Australian dollar, enacting the Sex Discrimination Act to prevent discrimination in the workplace, declaring "Advance Australia Fair" as the country's national anthem, initiating superannuation pension schemes for all workers, negotiating a ban on mining in Antarctica and overseeing passage of the Australia Act that removed all remaining jurisdiction by the United Kingdom from Australia.

Instead of supporting the public ownership of government industries, the Hawke government sought to redistribute money from the wealthy to the poor via direct fiscal transfers and training programs to help people find employment. Measures implemented by the Hawke government towards this end included the creation of programs such as Newstart, commonwealth rent assistance and the Family Tax Benefit as well as increased progressiveness in taxation. The Hawke government privatised state-owned enterprises such as Qantas.

In June 1991, Hawke faced a leadership challenge by the Treasurer, Paul Keating, but Hawke managed to retain power; however, Keating mounted a second challenge six months later, and won narrowly, replacing Hawke as prime minister. Hawke subsequently retired from parliament, pursuing both a business career and a number of charitable causes, until his death in 2019, aged 89. Hawke remains his party's longest-serving prime minister, and Australia's third-longest-serving prime minister behind Robert Menzies and John Howard. He is also the only prime minister to be born in South Australia and the only one raised and educated in Western Australia. Hawke holds the highest-ever approval rating for an Australian prime minister, reaching 75% approval in 1984. Hawke is frequently ranked within the upper tier of Australian prime ministers by historians.

== Early life and family ==
Bob Hawke was born on 9 December 1929 in Border Town, South Australia, the second child of Arthur "Clem" Hawke (1898–1989), a Congregationalist minister, and his wife Edith Emily (Lee) (1897–1979) (known as Ellie), a schoolteacher. His uncle, Bert, was the Labor premier of Western Australia between 1953 and 1959.

Hawke's brother Neil, who was seven years his senior, died at the age of seventeen after contracting meningitis, for which there was no cure at the time. Ellie Hawke subsequently developed an almost messianic belief in her son's destiny, and this contributed to Hawke's supreme self-confidence throughout his career. At the age of fifteen, he presciently boasted to friends that he would one day become the prime minister of Australia.

At the age of seventeen, Hawke had a serious crash while riding his Panther motorcycle that left him in a critical condition for several days. This near-death experience acted as his catalyst, driving him to make the most of his talents and not let his abilities go to waste. He joined the Labor Party in 1947 at the age of eighteen.

== Education and early career ==
Hawke was educated at West Leederville State School, Perth Modern School and the University of Western Australia, graduating in 1952 with Bachelor of Arts and Bachelor of Laws degrees. He was also president of the university's guild during the same year. The following year, Hawke won a Rhodes Scholarship to attend University College, Oxford, where he began a Bachelor of Arts course in philosophy, politics and economics (PPE). He soon found he was covering much the same ground as he had in his education at the University of Western Australia, and transferred to a Bachelor of Letters course. He wrote his thesis on wage-fixing in Australia and successfully presented it in January 1956.

In 1956, Hawke accepted a scholarship to undertake doctoral studies in the area of arbitration law in the law department at the Australian National University in Canberra. Soon after his arrival at ANU, he became the students' representative on the University Council. A year later, he was recommended to the president of the ACTU to become a research officer, replacing Harold Souter who had become ACTU Secretary. The recommendation was made by Hawke's mentor at ANU, H. P. Brown, who for a number of years had assisted the ACTU in national wage cases. Hawke decided to abandon his doctoral studies and accept the offer, moving to Melbourne with his wife Hazel.

== Australian Council of Trade Unions ==
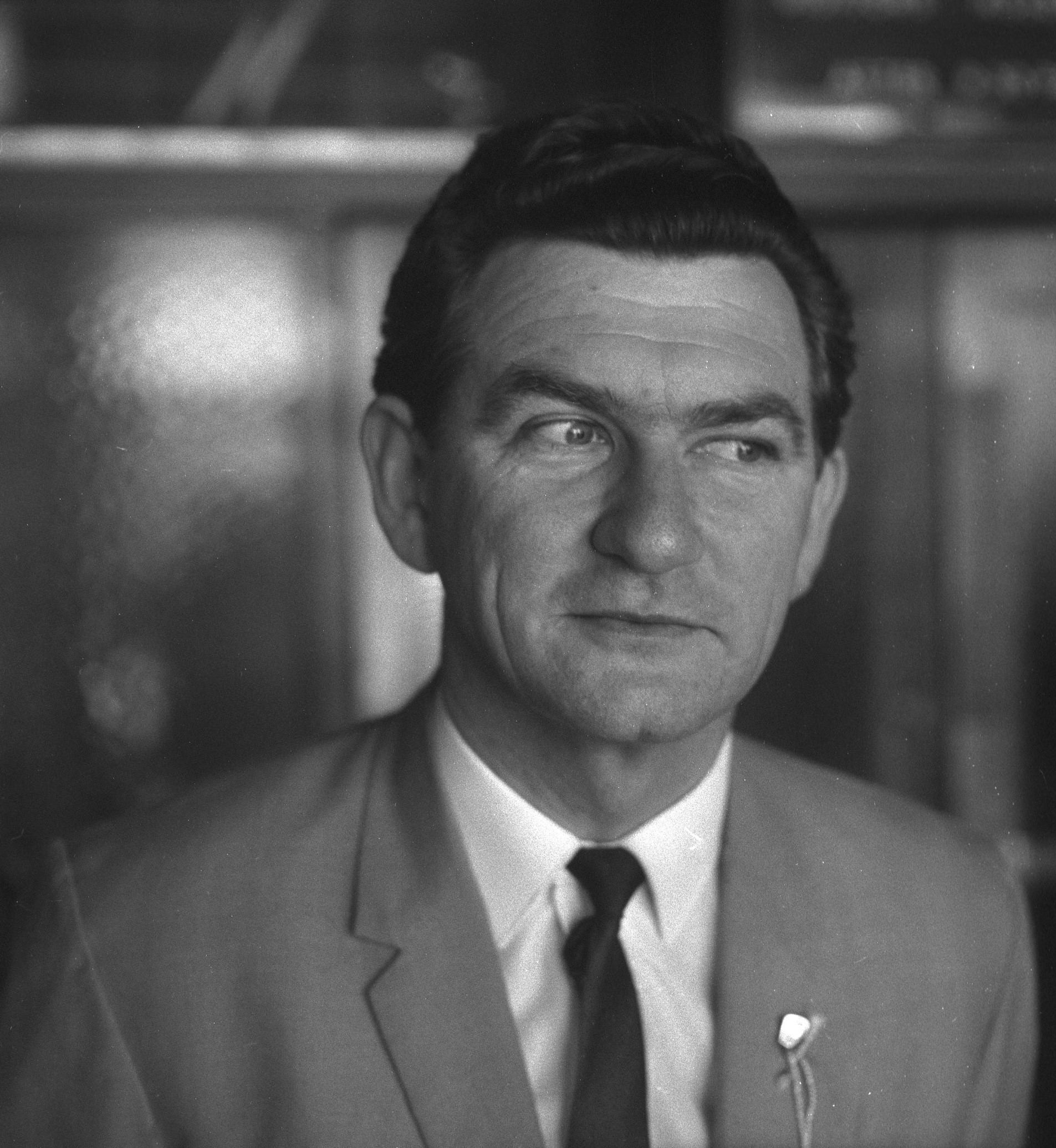
Hawke is elected President of the ACTU at Paddington Town Hall, Sydney, 10 September 1969

Not long after Hawke began work at the ACTU, he became responsible for the presentation of its annual case for higher wages to the national wages tribunal, the Commonwealth Conciliation and Arbitration Commission. He was first appointed as an ACTU advocate in 1959. The 1958 case, under previous advocate R.L. Eggleston, had yielded only a five-shilling increase. The 1959 case found for a fifteen-shilling increase, and was regarded as a personal triumph for Hawke. He went on to attain such success and prominence in his role as an ACTU advocate that, in 1969, he was encouraged to run for the position of ACTU President, despite the fact that he had never held elected office in a trade union.

He was elected ACTU President in 1969 on a modernising platform by the narrow margin of 399 to 350, with the support of the left of the union movement, including some associated with the Communist Party of Australia; AMIEU secretary and known communist George Seelaf played a major role in his election. He later credited Ray Gietzelt, General Secretary of the FMWU, as the single most significant union figure in helping him achieve this outcome. Questioned after his election on his political stance, Hawke stated that "socialist is not a word I would use to describe myself", saying instead his approach to politics was pragmatic. His commitment to the cause of Jewish Refuseniks purportedly led to a planned assassination attempt on Hawke by the Popular Front for the Liberation of Palestine, and its Australian operative Munif Mohammed Abou Rish.

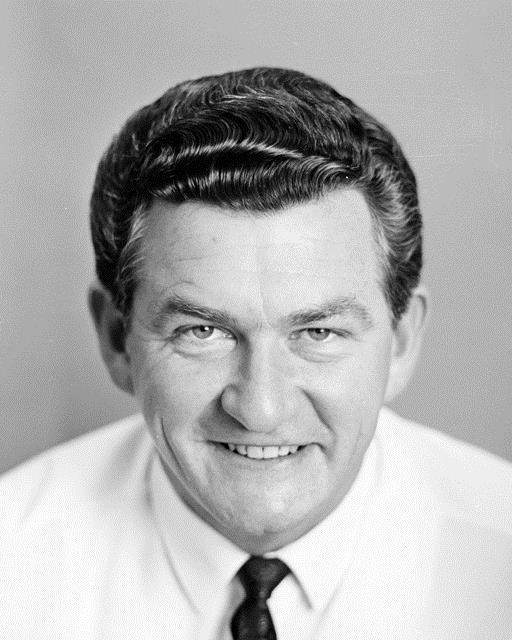
Hawke as ACTU President in 1970

In 1971, Hawke along with other members of the ACTU requested that South Africa send a non-racially biased team for the rugby union tour, with the intention of unions agreeing not to serve the team in Australia. Prior to arrival, the Western Australian branch of the Transport Workers' Union, and the Barmaids' and Barmens' Union, announced that they would serve the team, which allowed the Springboks to land in Perth. The tour commenced on 26 June and riots occurred as anti-apartheid protesters disrupted games. Hawke and his family started to receive malicious mail and phone calls from people who thought that sport and politics should not mix. Hawke remained committed to the ban on apartheid teams and later that year, the South African cricket team was successfully denied and no apartheid team was to ever come to Australia again. It was this ongoing dedication to racial equality in South Africa that would later earn Hawke the respect and friendship of Nelson Mandela.

In industrial matters, Hawke continued to demonstrate a preference for, and considerable skill at, negotiation, and was generally liked and respected by employers as well as the unions he advocated for. As early as 1972, speculation began that he would seek to enter the Parliament of Australia and eventually run to become the Leader of the Australian Labor Party. But while his professional career continued successfully, his heavy drinking and womanising placed considerable strains on his family life.

In June 1973, Hawke was elected as the Federal President of the Labor Party. Two years later, when the Whitlam government was controversially dismissed by the Governor-General, Hawke showed an initial keenness to enter Parliament at the ensuing election. Harry Jenkins, the MP for Scullin, came under pressure to step down to allow Hawke to stand in his place, but he strongly resisted this push. Hawke eventually decided not to attempt to enter Parliament at that time, a decision he soon regretted. After Labor was defeated at the election, Whitlam initially offered the leadership to Hawke, although it was not within Whitlam's power to decide who would succeed him. Despite not taking on the offer, Hawke remained influential, playing a key role in averting national strike action.

During the 1977 federal election, he emerged as a strident opponent of accepting Vietnamese boat people as refugees into Australia, stating that they should be subject to normal immigration requirements and should otherwise be deported. He further stated only refugees selected off-shore should be accepted.

Hawke resigned as President of the Labor Party in August 1978. Neil Batt was elected in his place. The strain of this period took its toll on Hawke and in 1979 he suffered a physical collapse. This shock led Hawke to publicly announce his alcoholism in a television interview, and that he would make a concerted—and ultimately successful—effort to overcome it. He was helped through this period by the relationship that he had established with writer Blanche d'Alpuget, who, in 1982, published a biography of Hawke. His popularity with the public was, if anything, enhanced by this period of rehabilitation, and opinion polling suggested that he was a more popular public figure than either Labor Leader Bill Hayden or Liberal Prime Minister Malcolm Fraser.

=== Informer for the United States ===
During the period of 1973 to 1979, Hawke acted as an informant for the United States government. According to Coventry, Hawke as concurrent leader of the ACTU and ALP informed the US of details surrounding labour disputes, especially those relating to American companies and individuals, such as union disputes with Ford Motor Company and the black ban of Frank Sinatra. The major industrial action taken against Sinatra came about because Sinatra had made sexist comments against female journalists. The dispute was the subject of the 2003 film The Night We Called It a Day.

In retaliation, unions grounded Sinatra's private jet in Melbourne, demanding he apologise. The popular view was that Mr Hawke engaged in protracted, boozy negotiations with Ol' Blue Eyes to reach a settlement. The [diplomatic] cables say the US embassy reached a deal with Mr Hawke to end the standoff, no apology was sought from Sinatra and that most of Mr Hawke's time was spent with the singer's lawyer.

Hawke was described by US diplomats as "a bulwark against anti-American sentiment and resurgent communism during the economic turmoil of the 1970s", and often disputed with the Whitlam government over issues of foreign policy and industrial relations. US diplomats played a major role in shaping Hawke's consensus politics and economics. Although Hawke spoke regularly to United States diplomats in the 1970s, there were many other prominent people from trade unions, party organisations and also politicians at that time who secretly gave information. Biographer Troy Bramston rejects the view that Hawke's discussions with diplomats at the US Embassy amounted to Hawke being a "spy" given it was so common for unionists and politicians to share and trade information.

== Member of Parliament ==
Hawke's first attempt to enter Parliament came during the 1963 federal election. He stood in the seat of Corio in Geelong and managed to achieve a 3.1% swing against the national trend, although he fell short of ousting longtime Liberal incumbent Hubert Opperman. Hawke rejected several opportunities to enter Parliament throughout the 1970s, something he later wrote that he "regretted". He eventually stood for election to the House of Representatives at the 1980 election for the safe Melbourne seat of Wills, securing victory by a 20% margin. Immediately upon his election to Parliament, Hawke was appointed to the Shadow Cabinet by Labor Leader Bill Hayden as Shadow Minister for Industrial Relations, Employment and Youth Affairs.

Hayden, after having led the Labor Party to narrowly lose the 1980 election, was increasingly subject to criticism from Labor MPs over his leadership style. To quell speculation over his position, Hayden called a leadership spill on 16 July 1982, believing that if he won he would be guaranteed to lead Labor through to the next election. Hawke decided to challenge Hayden in the spill, but Hayden defeated him by five votes; the margin of victory, however, was too slim to dispel doubts that he could lead the Labor Party to victory at an election. Despite his defeat, Hawke began to agitate more seriously behind the scenes for a change in leadership, with opinion polls continuing to show that Hawke was a far more popular public figure than both Hayden and Prime Minister Malcolm Fraser. Hayden was further weakened after Labor's unexpectedly poor performance at a by-election in December 1982 for the Victorian seat of Flinders, following the resignation of the sitting member, former deputy Liberal leader Phillip Lynch. Labor needed a swing of 5.5% to win the seat and had been predicted by the media to win, but could only achieve 3%.

Labor Party power-brokers, such as Graham Richardson and Barrie Unsworth, now openly switched their allegiance from Hayden to Hawke. More significantly, Hayden's staunch friend and political ally, Labor's Senate Leader John Button, had become convinced that Hawke's chances of victory at an election were greater than Hayden's. Initially, Hayden believed that he could remain in his job, but Button's defection proved to be the final straw in convincing Hayden that he would have to resign as Labor Leader. Less than two months after the Flinders by-election result, Hayden announced his resignation as Leader of the Labor Party on 3 February 1983. Hawke was subsequently elected as Leader unopposed on 8 February, and became Leader of the Opposition in the process. Having learned that morning about the possible leadership change, on the same day that Hawke assumed the leadership of the Labor Party, Malcolm Fraser called a snap election for 5 March 1983, unsuccessfully attempting to prevent Labor from making the leadership change. However, he was unable to have the Governor-General confirm the election before Labor announced the change.

At the 1983 election, Hawke led Labor to a landslide victory, achieving a 24-seat swing and ending seven years of Liberal Party rule.

With the election called at the same time that Hawke became Labor leader this meant that Hawke never sat in Parliament as Leader of the Opposition having spent the entirety of his short Opposition leadership in the election campaign which he won.

== Prime Minister of Australia (1983–1991) ==
=== Leadership style ===
After Labor's landslide victory, Hawke was sworn in as the prime minister by the governor-general Ninian Stephen on 11 March 1983. The style of the Hawke government was deliberately distinct from the Whitlam government, the Labor government that preceded it. Rather than immediately initiating multiple extensive reform programs as Whitlam had, Hawke announced that Malcolm Fraser's pre-election concealment of the budget deficit meant that many of Labor's election commitments would have to be deferred. As part of his internal reforms package, Hawke divided the government into two tiers, with only the most senior ministers sitting in the Cabinet of Australia. The Labor caucus was still given the authority to determine who would make up the Ministry, but this move gave Hawke unprecedented powers to empower individual ministers. Following his election victory, Hawke expressed his belief that “The work and efforts, the experience and the experiments, the success or failure of this Australian Labor Government, are critically important to the whole future of the Labor cause, the cause of social democracy, throughout the industrialised world.”

After Australia won the America's Cup in 1983 Hawke said "any boss who sacks anyone for not turning up today is a bum", effectively declaring an impromptu national public holiday.

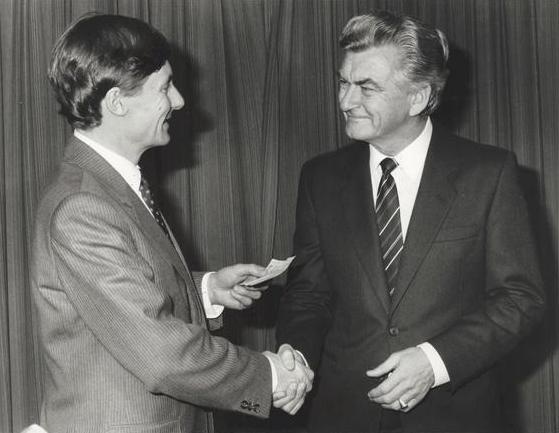
Hawke presenting a relief cheque to John Bannon, Premier of South Australia following the 1983 Ash Wednesday bushfires

In particular, the political partnership that developed between Hawke and his Treasurer, Paul Keating, proved to be essential to Labor's success in government, with multiple Labor figures in years since citing the partnership as the party's greatest ever. The two men proved a study in contrasts: Hawke was a Rhodes Scholar; Keating left high school early. Hawke's enthusiasms were cigars, betting and most forms of sport; Keating preferred classical architecture, Mahler symphonies and collecting British Regency and French Empire antiques. Despite not knowing one another before Hawke assumed the leadership in 1983, the two formed a personal as well as political relationship which enabled the Government to pursue a significant number of reforms, although there were occasional points of tension between the two.

The Labor Caucus under Hawke also developed a more formalised system of parliamentary factions, which significantly altered the dynamics of caucus operations. Unlike many of his predecessor leaders, Hawke's authority within the Labor Party was absolute. This enabled him to persuade MPs to support a substantial set of policy changes which had not been considered achievable by Labor governments in the past. Individual accounts from ministers indicate that while Hawke was not often the driving force behind individual reforms, outside of broader economic changes, he took on the role of providing political guidance on what was electorally feasible and how best to sell it to the public, tasks at which he proved highly successful. Hawke took on a very public role as prime minister, campaigning frequently even outside of election periods, and for much of his time in office proved to be incredibly popular with the Australian electorate; to this date he still holds the highest ever AC Nielsen approval rating of 75%.

=== Economic policy ===
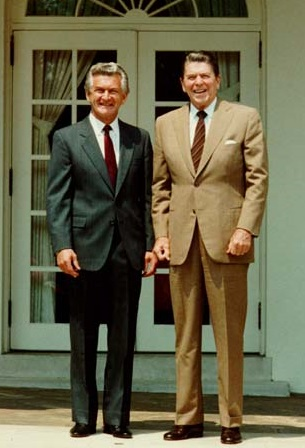
Hawke and US President Ronald Reagan at the White House in November 1984

The Hawke government oversaw significant economic reforms, and is often cited by economic historians as being a "turning point" from a protectionist, agricultural model to a more globalised and services-oriented economy. According to the journalist Paul Kelly, "the most influential economic decisions of the 1980s were the floating of the Australian dollar and the deregulation of the financial system". Although the Fraser government had played a part in the process of financial deregulation by commissioning the 1981 Campbell Report, opposition from Fraser himself had stalled this process. Shortly after its election in 1983, the Hawke government took the opportunity to implement a comprehensive program of economic reform, in the process "transform(ing) economics and politics in Australia".

Hawke and Keating together led the process for overseeing the economic changes by launching a "National Economic Summit" one month after their election in 1983, which brought together business and industrial leaders together with politicians and trade union leaders; the three-day summit led to a unanimous adoption of a national economic strategy, generating sufficient political capital for widespread reform to follow. Among other reforms, the Hawke government floated the Australian dollar, repealed rules that prohibited foreign-owned banks to operate in Australia, dismantled the protectionist tariff system, privatised several state sector industries, ended the subsidisation of loss-making industries, and sold off part of the state-owned Commonwealth Bank.

The taxation system was also significantly reformed, with income tax rates reduced and the introduction of a fringe benefits tax and a capital gains tax; the latter two reforms were strongly opposed by the Liberal Party at the time, but were never reversed by them when they eventually returned to office in 1996. Partially offsetting these imposts upon the business community—the "main loser" from the 1985 Tax Summit according to Paul Kelly—was the introduction of full dividend imputation, a reform insisted upon by Keating. Funding for schools was also considerably increased as part of this package, while financial assistance was provided for students to enable them to stay at school longer; the number of Australian children completing school rose from 3 in 10 at the beginning of the Hawke government to 7 in 10 by its conclusion in 1991. Considerable progress was also made in directing assistance "to the most disadvantaged recipients over the whole range of welfare benefits."

=== Social and environmental policy ===
Although criticisms were leveled against the Hawke government that it did not achieve all it said it would do on social policy, it nevertheless enacted a series of reforms which remain in place to the present day. From 1983 to 1989, the Government oversaw the permanent establishment of universal health care in Australia with the creation of Medicare, doubled the number of subsidised childcare places, began the introduction of occupational superannuation, oversaw a significant increase in school retention rates, created subsidised homecare services, oversaw the elimination of poverty traps in the welfare system, increased the real value of the old-age pension, reintroduced the six-monthly indexation of single-person unemployment benefits, and established a wide-ranging programme for paid family support, known as the Family Income Supplement.

A number of other new social security benefits were introduced under the Hawke-Keating Government. In 1984, for instance, a remote area allowance was introduced for pensioners and beneficiaries residing in special areas of Tax Zone A, and in 1985 a special addition to family allowances was made payable (as noted by one study) “to certain families with multiple births (three children or more) until the children reach six years of age.” The following year, rent assistance was extended to unemployment beneficiaries, together with a young homeless allowance for sickness and unemployment beneficiaries under the age of 18 who were homeless and didn't have parental or custodial support. However, the payment of family allowances for student children reaching the age of 18 was discontinued except in the case of certain families on low incomes.

During the 1980s, the proportion of total government outlays allocated to families, the sick, single parents, widows, the handicapped, and veterans was significantly higher than under the previous Fraser and Whitlam governments.

In 1984, the Hawke government enacted the landmark Sex Discrimination Act 1984, which eliminated discrimination on the grounds of sex within the workplace. In 1989, Hawke oversaw the gradual re-introduction of some tuition fees for university study, setting up the Higher Education Contributions Scheme (HECS). Under the original HECS, a fee of A$1,800, equivalent to A$4,281 in 2022, was charged to all university students, and the Commonwealth paid the balance. A student could defer payment of this HECS amount and repay the debt through the tax system, when the student's income exceeds a threshold level. As part of the reforms, Colleges of Advanced Education entered the university sector by various means. By doing so, university places were able to be expanded. Further notable policy decisions taken during the Government's time in office included the public health campaign regarding HIV/AIDS, and Indigenous land rights reform, with an investigation of the idea of a treaty between Aboriginal and Torres Strait Islander peoples and the Government being launched, although the latter would be overtaken by events, notably the Mabo court decision.

The Hawke government also drew attention for a series of notable environmental decisions, particularly in its second and third terms. In 1983, Hawke personally vetoed the construction of the Franklin Dam in Tasmania, responding to a groundswell of protest around the issue. Hawke also secured the nomination of the Wet Tropics of Queensland as a UNESCO World Heritage Site in 1987, preventing the forests there from being logged. Hawke would later appoint Graham Richardson as Environment Minister, tasking him with winning the second-preference support from environmental parties, something which Richardson later claimed was the major factor in the government's narrow re-election at the 1990 election. In the Government's fourth term, Hawke personally led the Australian delegation to secure changes to the Protocol on Environmental Protection to the Antarctic Treaty, ultimately winning a guarantee that drilling for minerals within Antarctica would be totally prohibited until 2048 at the earliest. Hawke later claimed that the Antarctic drilling ban was his "proudest achievement".

=== Industrial relations policy ===
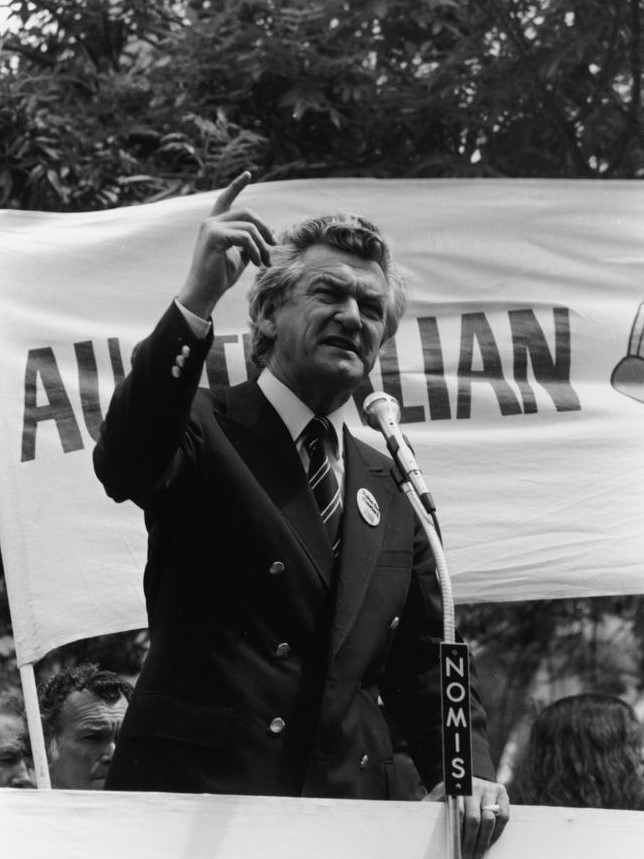
Hawke addresses the Labour Day crowd, 1980

As a former ACTU President, Hawke was well-placed to engage in reform of the industrial relations system in Australia, taking a lead on this policy area as in few others. Working closely with ministerial colleagues and the ACTU Secretary, Bill Kelty, Hawke negotiated with trade unions to establish the Prices and Incomes Accord in 1983, an agreement whereby unions agreed to restrict their demands for wage increases, and in turn the Government guaranteed to both minimise inflation and promote an increased social wage, including by establishing new social programmes such as Medicare.

Inflation had been a significant issue for the previous decade prior to the election of the Hawke government, regularly running into double-digits. The process of the Accord, by which the Government and trade unions would arbitrate and agree upon wage increases in many sectors, led to a decrease in both inflation and unemployment through to 1990. Criticisms of the Accord would come from both the right and the left of politics. Left-wing critics claimed that it kept real wages stagnant, and that the Accord was a policy of class collaboration and corporatism. By contrast, right-wing critics claimed that the Accord reduced the flexibility of the wages system. Supporters of the Accord, however, pointed to the improvements in the social security system that occurred, including the introduction of rental assistance for social security recipients, the creation of labour market schemes such as NewStart, and the introduction of the Family Income Supplement. In 1986, the Hawke government passed a bill to de-register the Builders Labourers Federation federally due to the union not following the Accord agreements.

Despite a percentage fall in real money wages from 1983 to 1991, the social wage of Australian workers was argued by the Government to have improved drastically as a result of these reforms, and the ensuing decline in inflation. The Accord was revisited six further times during the Hawke government, each time in response to new economic developments. The seventh and final revisiting would ultimately lead to the establishment of the enterprise bargaining system, although this would be finalised shortly after Hawke left office in 1991.

=== Foreign policy ===
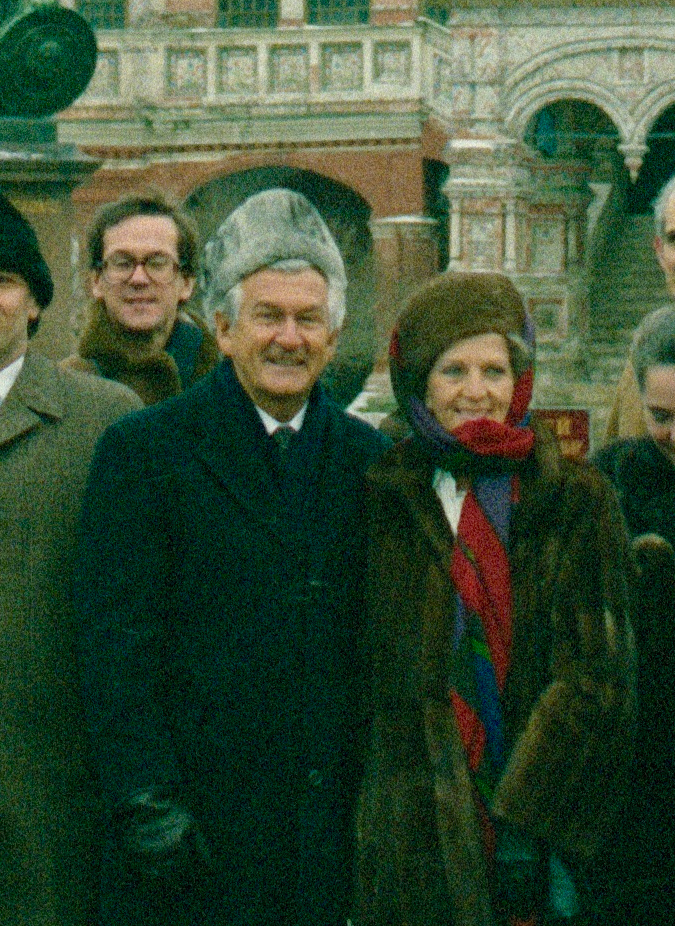
Hawke with wife Hazel in Moscow, 1987

Arguably the most significant foreign policy achievement of the Government took place in 1989, after Hawke proposed a south-east Asian region-wide forum for leaders and economic ministers to discuss issues of common concern. After winning the support of key countries in the region, this led to the creation of the Asia-Pacific Economic Cooperation (APEC). The first APEC meeting duly took place in Canberra in November 1989; the economic ministers of Australia, Brunei, Canada, Indonesia, Japan, South Korea, Malaysia, New Zealand, Philippines, Singapore, Thailand and the United States all attended. APEC would subsequently grow to become one of the most pre-eminent high-level international forums in the world, particularly after the later inclusions of China and Russia, and the Keating government's later establishment of the APEC Leaders' Forum.

Elsewhere in Asia, the Hawke government played a significant role in the build-up to the United Nations peace process for Cambodia, culminating in the Transitional Authority; Hawke's Foreign Minister Gareth Evans was nominated for the Nobel Peace Prize for his role in negotiations. Hawke also took a major public stand after the 1989 Tiananmen Square protests and massacre; despite having spent years trying to get closer relations with China, Hawke gave a tearful address on national television describing the massacre in graphic detail, and unilaterally offered asylum to over 42,000 Chinese students who were living in Australia at the time, many of whom had publicly supported the Tiananmen protesters. Hawke did so without even consulting his Cabinet, stating later that he felt he simply had to act.

The Hawke government pursued a close relationship with the United States, assisted by Hawke's close friendship with US Secretary of State George Shultz; this led to a degree of controversy when the Government supported the US's plans to test ballistic missiles off the coast of Tasmania in 1985, as well as seeking to overturn Australia's long-standing ban on uranium exports. Although the US ultimately withdrew the plans to test the missiles, the furore led to a fall in Hawke's approval ratings. Shortly after the 1990 election, Hawke would lead Australia into its first overseas military campaign since the Vietnam War, forming a close alliance with US President George H. W. Bush to join the coalition in the Gulf War. The Royal Australian Navy contributed several destroyers and frigates to the war effort, which successfully concluded in February 1991, with the expulsion of Iraqi forces from Kuwait. The success of the campaign, and the lack of any Australian casualties, led to a brief increase in the popularity of the Government.

Through his role on the Commonwealth Heads of Government Meeting, Hawke played a leading role in ensuring the Commonwealth initiated an international boycott on foreign investment into South Africa, building on work undertaken by his predecessor Malcolm Fraser, and in the process clashing publicly with Prime Minister of the United Kingdom Margaret Thatcher, who initially favoured a more cautious approach. The resulting boycott, led by the Commonwealth, was widely credited with helping bring about the collapse of apartheid, and resulted in a high-profile visit by Nelson Mandela in October 1990, months after the latter's release from a 27-year stint in prison. During the visit, Mandela publicly thanked the Hawke government for the role it played in the boycott.

=== Election wins and leadership challenges ===
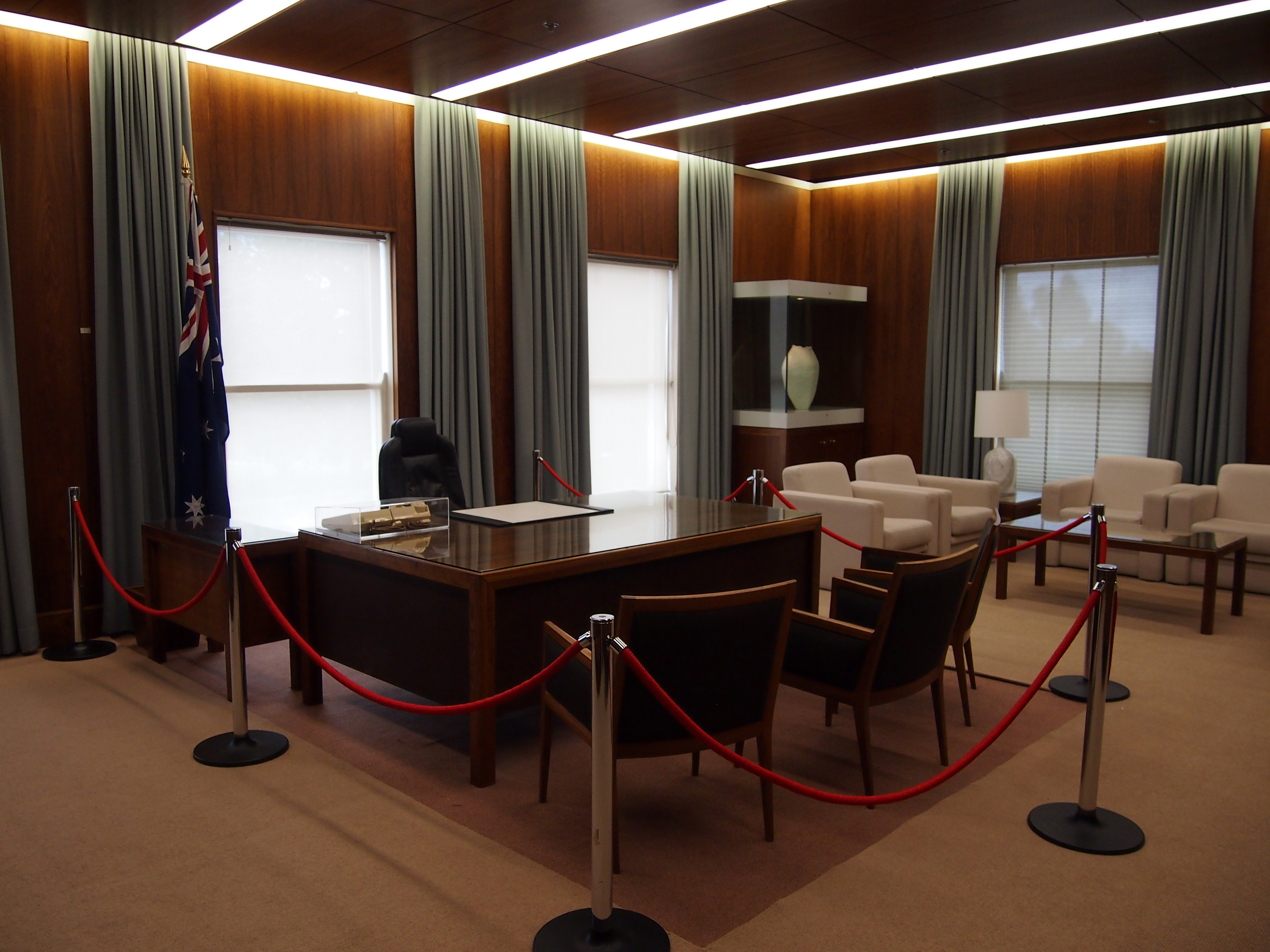
Prime Minister's Office preserved from Hawke's time in office in 1988, Old Parliament House

Hawke benefited greatly from the disarray into which the Liberal Party fell after the resignation of Fraser following the 1983 election. The Liberals were torn between supporters of the more conservative John Howard and the more liberal Andrew Peacock, with the pair frequently contesting the leadership. Hawke and Keating were also able to use the concealment of the size of the budget deficit by Fraser before the 1983 election to great effect, damaging the Liberal Party's economic credibility as a result.

However, Hawke's time as prime minister also saw friction develop between himself and the grassroots of the Labor Party, many of whom were unhappy at what they viewed as Hawke's iconoclasm and willingness to cooperate with business interests. Hawke regularly and publicly expressed his willingness to cull Labor's "sacred cows". The Labor Left faction, as well as prominent Labor backbencher Barry Jones, offered repeated criticisms of a number of government decisions. Hawke was also subject to challenges from some former colleagues in the trade union movement over his "confrontationalist style" in siding with the airline companies in the 1989 Australian pilots' strike.

Nevertheless, Hawke was able to comfortably maintain a lead as preferred prime minister in the vast majority of opinion polls carried out throughout his time in office. He recorded the highest popularity rating ever measured by an Australian opinion poll, reaching 75% approval in 1984. After leading Labor to a comfortable victory in the snap 1984 election, called to bring the mandate of the House of Representatives back in line with the Senate, Hawke was able to secure an unprecedented third consecutive term for Labor with a comfortable victory in the double dissolution election of 1987. Hawke was subsequently able to lead the nation in the bicentennial celebrations of 1988, culminating with him welcoming Queen Elizabeth II to open the newly constructed Parliament House.

The late-1980s recession, and the accompanying high interest rates, saw the Government fall in opinion polls, with many doubting that Hawke could win a fourth election. Keating, who had long understood that he would eventually succeed Hawke as prime minister, began to plan a leadership change; at the end of 1988, Keating put pressure on Hawke to retire in the new year. Hawke rejected this suggestion but reached a secret agreement with Keating, the so-called "Kirribilli Agreement", stating that he would step down in Keating's favour at some point after the 1990 election. Hawke subsequently won that election, in the process leading Labor to a record fourth consecutive electoral victory, albeit by a slim margin. Hawke appointed Keating as deputy prime minister to replace the retiring Lionel Bowen.

By the end of 1990, frustrated by the lack of any indication from Hawke as to when he might retire, Keating made a provocative speech to the Federal Parliamentary Press Gallery. Hawke considered the speech disloyal, and told Keating he would renege on the Kirribilli Agreement as a result. After attempting to force a resolution privately, Keating finally resigned from the Government in June 1991 to challenge Hawke for the leadership. His resignation came soon after Hawke vetoed in Cabinet a proposal backed by Keating and other ministers for mining to take place at Coronation Hill in Kakadu National Park. Hawke won the leadership spill, and in a press conference after the result, Keating declared that he had fired his "one shot" on the leadership. Hawke appointed John Kerin to replace Keating as treasurer.

Despite his victory in the June spill, Hawke quickly began to be regarded by many of his colleagues as a "wounded" leader; he had now lost his long-term political partner, his ratings in opinion polls were beginning to fall significantly, and after nearly nine years as prime minister, there was speculation that it would soon be time for a new leader. Hawke's leadership was ultimately irrevocably damaged at the end of 1991; after Liberal Leader John Hewson released 'Fightback!', a detailed proposal for sweeping economic change, including the introduction of a goods and services tax, Hawke was forced to sack Kerin as treasurer after the latter made a public gaffe attempting to attack the policy. Keating duly challenged for the leadership a second time on 19 December, arguing that he would be better placed to defeat Hewson; this time, Keating succeeded, narrowly defeating Hawke by 56 votes to 51.

In a speech to the House of Representatives following the vote, Hawke declared that his nine years as prime minister had left Australia a better and wealthier country, and he was given a standing ovation by those present. He subsequently tendered his resignation to the Governor-General and pledged support to his successor. Hawke briefly returned to the backbench, before resigning from Parliament on 20 February 1992, sparking a by-election which was won by the independent candidate Phil Cleary from among a record field of 22 candidates. Keating would go on to lead Labor to a fifth victory at the 1993 election, although he was defeated by the Liberal Party at the 1996 election.

Hawke wrote that he had very few regrets over his time in office, although stated he wished he had been able to advance the cause of Indigenous land rights further. His bitterness towards Keating over the leadership challenges surfaced in his earlier memoirs, although by the 2000s Hawke stated he and Keating had buried their differences, and that they regularly dined together and considered each other friends. The publication of the book Hawke: The Prime Minister, by Hawke's second wife, Blanche d'Alpuget, in 2010, reignited conflict between the two, with Keating accusing Hawke and d'Alpuget of spreading falsehoods about his role in the Hawke government. Despite this, the two campaigned together for Labor several times, including at the 2019 election, where they released their first joint article for nearly three decades; Craig Emerson, who worked for both men, said they had reconciled in later years after Hawke grew ill.

== Retirement and later life ==
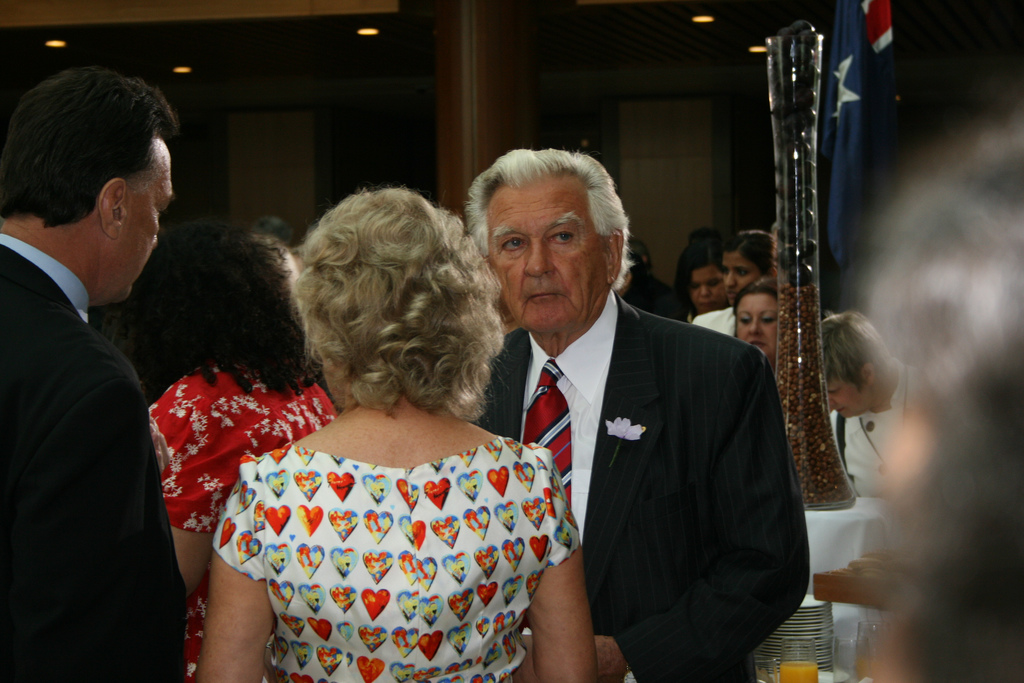
Hawke at Parliament House for the Apology to the Stolen Generations in 2008

After leaving Parliament, Hawke entered the business world, taking on a number of directorships and consultancy positions which enabled him to achieve considerable financial success. He avoided public involvement with the Labor Party during Keating's tenure as prime minister, not wanting to be seen as attempting to overshadow his successor. After Keating's defeat and the election of the Howard government at the 1996 election, he returned to public campaigning with Labor and regularly appearing at election launches. Despite his personal affection for Queen Elizabeth II, boasting that he had been her "favourite Prime Minister", Hawke was an enthusiastic republican and joined the campaign for a Yes vote in the 1999 republic referendum.

In 2002, Hawke was named to South Australia's Economic Development Board during the Rann government. In the lead up to the 2007 election, Hawke made a considerable personal effort to support Kevin Rudd, making speeches at a large number of campaign office openings across Australia, and appearing in multiple campaign advertisements. As well as campaigning against WorkChoices, Hawke also attacked John Howard's record as treasurer, stating "it was the judgement of every economist and international financial institution that it was the restructuring reforms undertaken by my government, with the full cooperation of the trade union movement, which created the strength of the Australian economy today". In February 2008, after Rudd's victory, Hawke joined former prime ministers Gough Whitlam, Malcolm Fraser and Paul Keating in Parliament House to witness the long anticipated apology to the Stolen Generations.

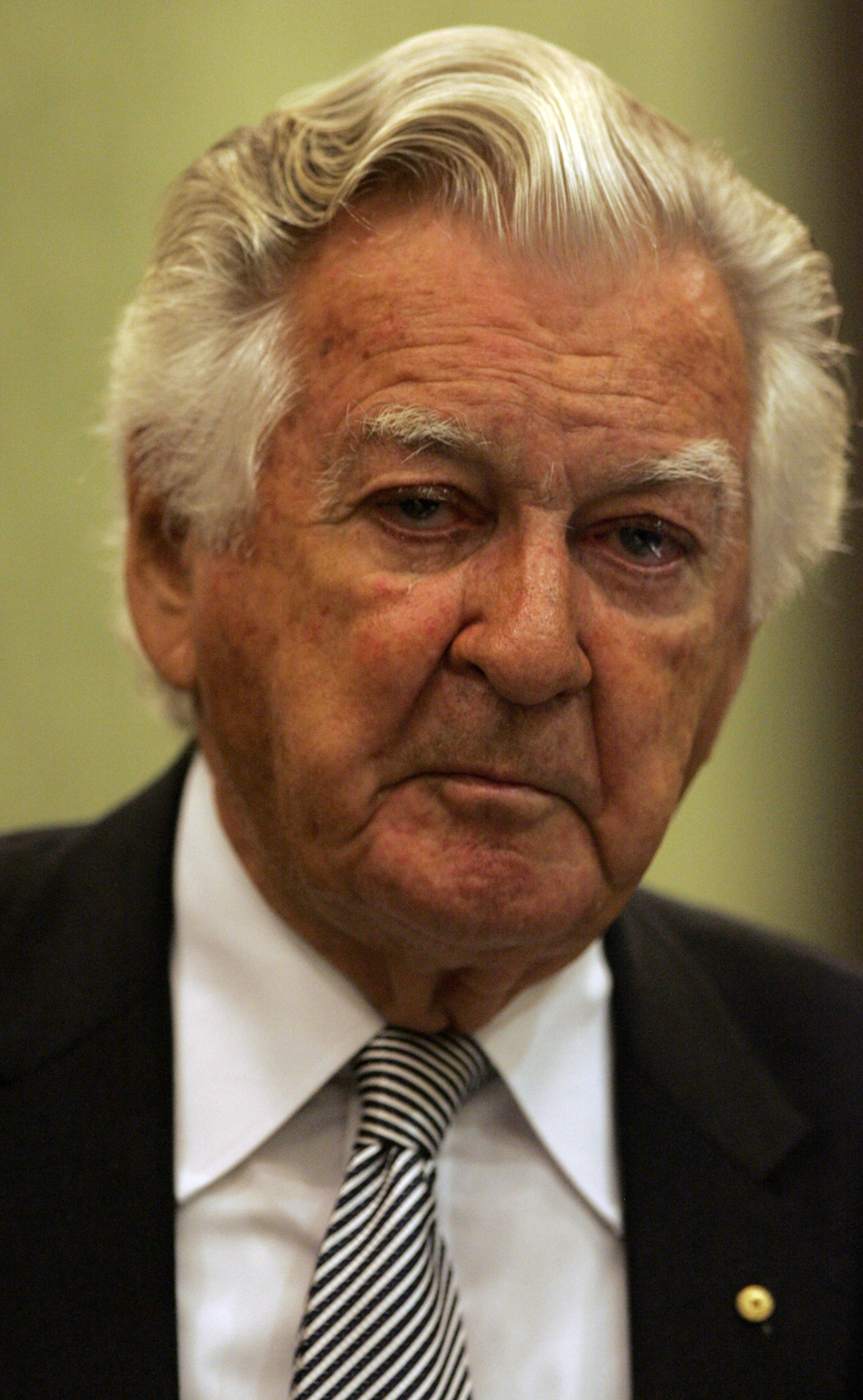
Hawke in 2012

In 2009, Hawke helped establish the Centre for Muslim and Non-Muslim Understanding at the University of South Australia. Interfaith dialogue was an important issue for Hawke, who told The Adelaide Review that he was "convinced that one of the great potential dangers confronting the world is the lack of understanding in regard to the Muslim world. Fanatics have misrepresented what Islam is. They give a false impression of the essential nature of Islam."

In 2016, after taking part in Andrew Denton's Better Off Dead podcast, Hawke added his voice to calls for voluntary euthanasia to be legalised. Hawke labelled as 'absurd' the lack of political will to fix the problem. He revealed that he had such an arrangement with his wife Blanche should such a devastating medical situation occur. He also publicly advocated for nuclear power and the importation of international spent nuclear fuel to Australia for storage and disposal, stating that this could lead to considerable economic benefits for Australia.

In late December 2018, Hawke revealed that he was in "terrible health". While predicting a Labor win in the upcoming 2019 federal election, Hawke said he "may not witness the party's success". In May 2019, the month of the election, he issued a joint statement with Paul Keating endorsing Labor's economic plan and condemning the Liberal Party for "completely [giving] up the economic reform agenda". They stated that "Shorten's Labor is the only party of government focused on the need to modernise the economy to deal with the major challenge of our time: human induced climate change". It was the first joint press statement released by the two since 1991.

In March 2022, Troy Bramston, a journalist for The Australian and a political historian, wrote an unauthorised biography of Hawke titled Bob Hawke: Demons and Destiny. Hawke gave Bramston full access to his previously unavailable personal papers and granted a series of interviews for the book. Bramston was the last person to interview Hawke before his death. The book, drawing on extensive Australian and international archives, and interviews with more than 100 people, is regarded as "definitive" and was shortlisted for the Australian Political Book of the Year Award.

On 16 May 2019, two days before the election, Hawke died at his home in Northbridge at the age of 89, following a short illness. His family held a private cremation on 27 May at Macquarie Park Cemetery and Crematorium where he was subsequently interred. A state memorial was held at the Sydney Opera House on 14 June; speakers included Craig Emerson as master of ceremonies and Kim Beazley reading the eulogy, as well as Paul Keating, Julia Gillard, Bill Kelty, Ross Garnaut, and incumbent prime minister Scott Morrison and Opposition Leader Anthony Albanese.

== Personal life ==
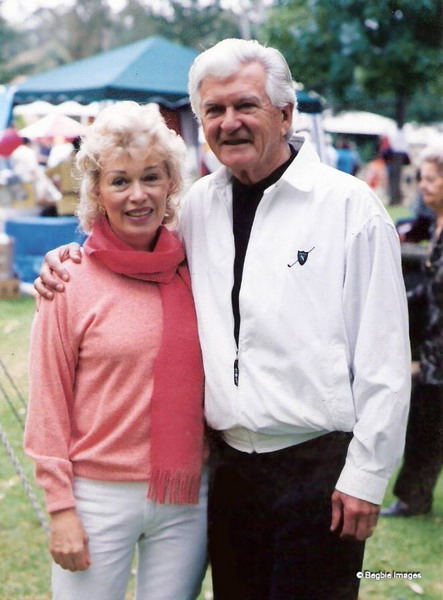
Hawke and his wife, Blanche d'Alpuget, in 2006

Hawke married Hazel Masterson in 1956 at Perth Trinity Church. They had three children: Susan (born 1957), Stephen (born 1959) and Roslyn (born 1961). Their fourth child, Robert Jr, died in early infancy in 1963. Hawke was named Victorian Father of the Year in 1971, an honour which his wife disputed due to his heavy drinking and womanising. The couple divorced in 1994, after he left her for the writer Blanche d'Alpuget, whom he married the following year, and the two lived together in Northbridge, a suburb on the North Shore of Sydney. The divorce estranged Hawke from some of his family for a period, although they had reconciled by the 2010s. Hawke was a supporter of National Rugby League club the Canberra Raiders.

=== Alcoholism and abstinence ===
Throughout his life before politics, Hawke was a heavy drinker. Hawke eventually suffered from alcohol poisoning following the death of his and Hazel's infant son in 1963. He publicly announced in 1980 that he would abstain from alcohol to seek election to Parliament, in a move which garnered significant public attention and support. It is popularly stated that Hawke began to drink again following his retirement from politics, although to a more manageable extent; on several occasions, in his later years, videos of Hawke downing beer at cricket matches would frequently go viral. There is evidence that Hawke did drink alcohol while in office, provided by then vice-president of the United States of America, George H. W. Bush, who later recalled shared drunken behaviour during Hawke's 1983 first official visit to the United States.

=== Religious views ===
On the subject of religion, Hawke wrote, while attending the 1952 World Christian Youth Conference in India, that "there were all these poverty stricken kids at the gate of this palatial place where we were feeding our face and I just (was) struck by this enormous sense of irrelevance of religion to the needs of people". He subsequently abandoned his Christian beliefs. By the time he entered politics he was a self-described agnostic. Hawke told Andrew Denton in 2008 that his father's Christian faith had continued to influence his outlook, saying "My father said if you believe in the fatherhood of God you must necessarily believe in the brotherhood of man, it follows necessarily, and even though I left the church and was not religious, that truth remained with me."

== Legacy ==
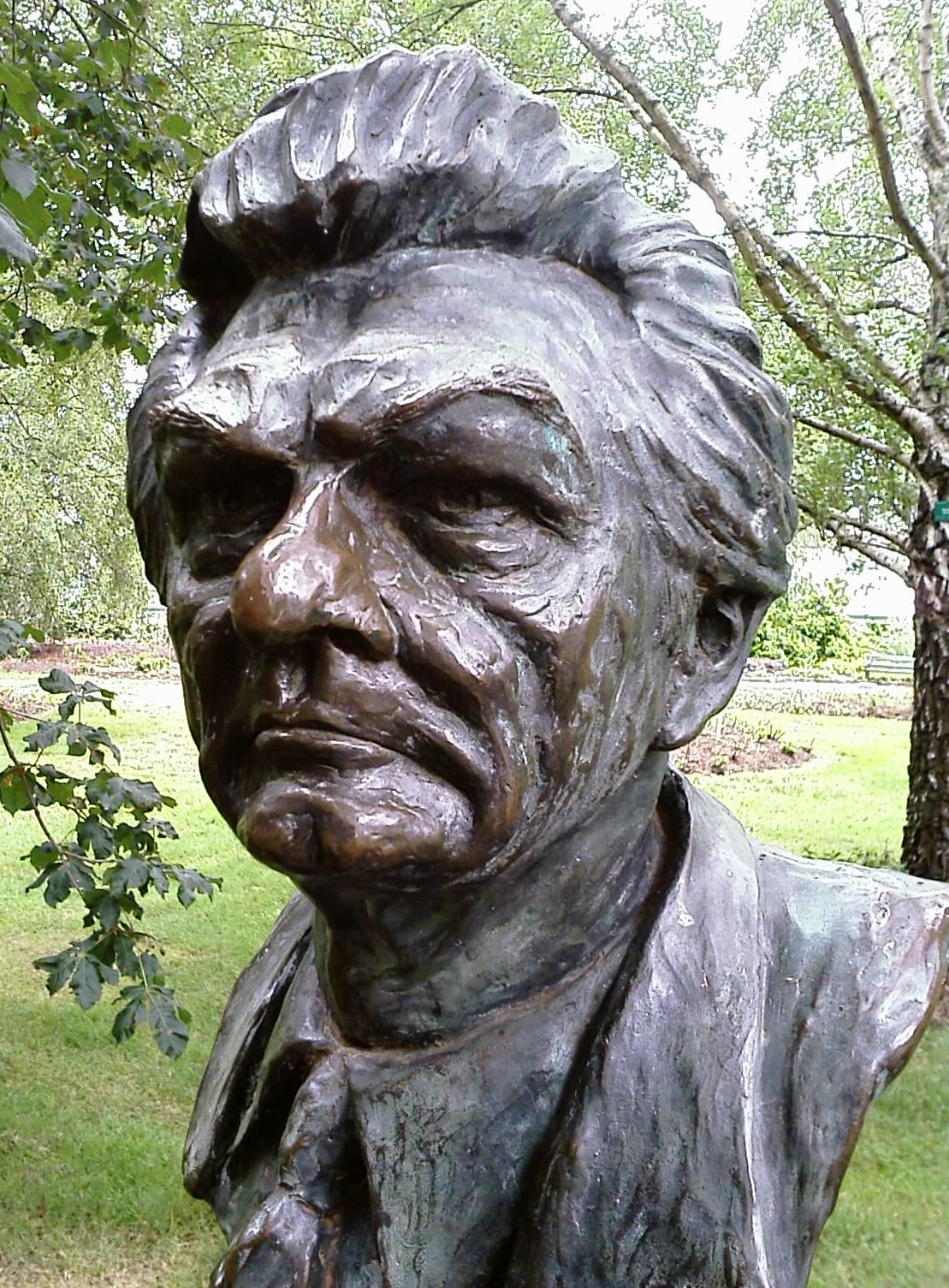
Bust of Hawke in the Prime Ministers Avenue in the Ballarat Botanical Gardens

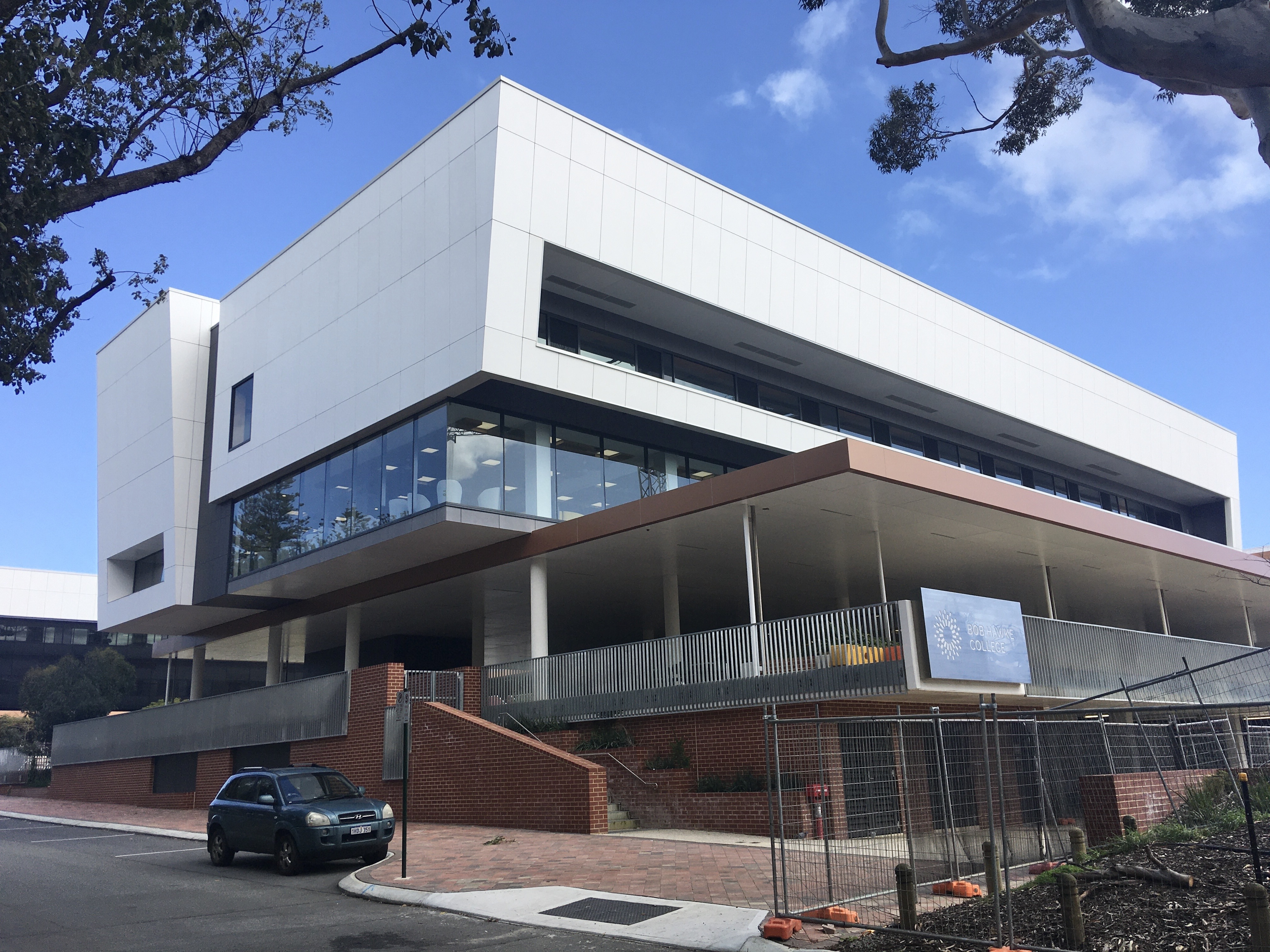
Bob Hawke College in Perth

A bust of Hawke in the Prime Ministers Avenue in the Ballarat Botanical Gardens is part of the Prime Ministers Avenue in the gardens, created by cartoonist Peter Nicholson.

The Bob Hawke Prime Ministerial Library was established in 1997 by the University of South Australia in Adelaide. It was the first of its kind in the world to be founded during the lifetime of a prime minister. The library was expanded following Hawke's death in 2019. The Bob Hawke Collection forms the bulk of its archives, and includes a large collection of his notes, personal papers, state gifts, biographical texts, newspaper extracts, photographs, political comics, articles, recordings and transcripts of speeches and media events, including documents from ministers from his cabinet. Notable artefacts held at the library include a hide belt gifted by former president Ronald Reagan, the jacket he wore to the 1983 America's Cup celebrations, a replica of a Panther Model 100 motorcycle that he crashed as a university student, and several prime ministerial briefcases.

The Bob Hawke Gallery in Bordertown, which contains memorabilia from his life, was opened by Hawke in 2002. Hawke House, the house in Bordertown where Hawke spent his early childhood, was purchased by the Australian Government in 2021 and opened as an accommodation and function space in May 2024. A bronze bust of Hawke is located at the town's civic centre.

A biographical television film, Hawke, premiered on the Ten Network in Australia on 18 July 2010, with Richard Roxburgh playing the title character. Rachael Blake and Felix Williamson portrayed Hazel Hawke and Paul Keating, respectively. Roxburgh reprised his role as Hawke in the 2020 episode "Terra Nullius" of the Netflix series The Crown.

The Australian Government pledged $5 million in July 2019 to establish a new annual scholarship—the Bob Hawke John Monash Scholarship—through the General Sir John Monash Foundation.

Bob Hawke College, a high school in Subiaco, Western Australia named after Hawke, was opened in February 2020.

In March 2020, the Australian Electoral Commission announced that it would create a new Australian electoral division in the House of Representatives named in honour of Hawke. The Division of Hawke was first contested at the 2022 federal election, and is located in the state of Victoria, near the seat of Wills, which Hawke represented from 1980 to 1992.

In December 2020, the Western Australian Government announced that it had purchased Hawke's childhood home in West Leederville and would maintain it as a state asset. The property will also be assessed for entry onto the State Register of Heritage Places.

=== Eponyms and tributes ===
- (Australia) Division of Hawke, an Australian electoral division in the state of Victoria first contested in 2022
- The Hawke Centre and the Bob Hawke Prime Ministerial Library at the University of South Australia
- Bob Hawke College, a public high-density secondary school in Subiaco, Western Australia founded in 2020
- (Victoria (state)) Bob Hawke Community Centre located in the inner-Melbourne suburb of Coburg
- Hawke House, a museum and hospitality business operated from the birth home of Bob Hawke in Bordertown, South Australia
- Bob Hawke Gallery, located within the civic centre of Bordertown, South Australia
- Hawke's Brewing, a brewing company named in honour of Hawke, which also operates the Bob Hawke Beer and Leisure Centre in Marrickville, New South Wales
- Hawke Avenue and Hawke Avenue Park in Collingwood Park, Queensland
- Bob Hawke Memorial Grove, a living memorial of Australian Christmas bush near his former home for 25 years in Northbridge, New South Wales
- (Australia) Hawke's Hut, officially the The Hon R J L Hawke AC Living Quarters are facilities at Wilkins Aerodrome, part of the Australian Antarctic Program
- (Australia) Bob Hawke Antarctic Science Fellowship, officially the RJL Hawke Post-Doctoral Fellowship for Antarctic Environmental Science is a 3-year government-funded fellowship through the Australian Antarctic Division
- (Western Australia) Bob Hawke Aboriginal Teacher Scholarships, a Western Australian government-funded scholarship program for indigenous tertiary education students
- Bob Hawke Regional Academic Scholarships, a program through Bob Hawke College awarding scholarships to students from regional and remote Western Australia
- (Australia) Bob Hawke John Monash Scholarship, an annual scholarship through Australian National University for "talented young Australians with ability and leadership potential to develop their skills at leading overseas universities"

== Honours ==
=== Australian honours and awards ===
- 1979: Companion of the Order of Australia (AC), "For services to trade unionism and industrial relations"
- (Australia) 2001: Centenary Medal

=== Foreign honours ===
- (Thailand) 1989: Knight Grand Cordon of the Order of the White Elephant
- (United Kingdom) 1999: Freedom of the City of London
- (Papua New Guinea) 2009: Grand Companion of the Order of Logohu
- (Japan) 2012: Grand Cordon of the Order of the Rising Sun

=== Fellowships ===
- (United Kingdom) 1952: University College, Oxford, Rhodes Scholarship

=== Honorary degrees ===
- 1984: University of Western Australia, Honorary Doctor of Letters
- (China) 1986: Nanjing University, Honorary doctorate
- (Israel) 1987: Hebrew University of Jerusalem, Honorary doctorate
- 1987: University of New South Wales, Honorary doctorate
- 1998: University of South Australia, Honorary doctorate
- (Japan) 2003: Rikkyo University, Honorary Doctor of Humanities
- (United Kingdom) 2003: University of Oxford, Honorary Doctor of Civil Law
- (New South Wales) 2013: Macquarie University, Honorary Doctor of Letters
- (New South Wales) 2016: University of Sydney, Honorary Doctor of Letters

=== Other ===
- (Victoria (state)) 1971: Victorian Father of the Year, awarded by YMCA Australia
- (Australia) 1978: Rostrum Award of Merit, for "excellence in the art of public speaking over a considerable period and his demonstration of an effective contribution to society through the spoken word"
- (Australia) 2009: Australian Labor Party Life membership, Bob Hawke became only the third person to be awarded life membership of the Australian Labor Party, after Gough and Margaret Whitlam. During the conferring, Prime Minister Kevin Rudd referred to Hawke as "the heart and soul of the Labor Party".
- 2014: University of Western Australia Student Guild Life membership
- (Australia) 2015: Australian Manufacturing Workers Union Life membership
- (Australia) 2016: Australian Services Union Life membership

== See also ==
- Hawke–Keating government
- First Hawke Ministry
- Second Hawke Ministry
- Third Hawke Ministry
- Fourth Hawke Ministry
- Political families of Australia
- Australian Council of Trade Unions
- Prices and Incomes Accord

== Bibliography ==
- Anson, Stan (1991). Hawke: An Emotional Life. Macphee Gribble.
- Blewett, Neal; Grattan, Michelle (2000). Australian Prime Ministers. Sydney: New Holland Publishers. ISBN 1-86436-756-3.
- Bolton, Geoffrey (1990). The Oxford History of Australia: The Middle Way: 1942–1988.
- Bramston, Troy (2022). Bob Hawke: Demons and Destiny. Viking. ISBN 9780143788096.
- Bramston, Troy; Ryan, Susan (2003). The Hawke Government : A Critical Retrospective. Pluto. ISBN 1-86403-264-2.
- d'Alpuget, Blanche (1984). Robert J. Hawke, a biography. Schwartz in conjunction with Landsdowne Press. ISBN 0-86753-001-4.
- d'Alpuget, Blanche (2011). Hawke: The Early Years. Melbourne University Publishing. ISBN 978-0-522-85800-6.
- d'Alpuget, Blanche (2019). Bob Hawke: The Complete Biography. Simon & Schuster. ISBN 978-1-76085-326-6.
- Davidson, Graham; Hirst, John; MacIntyre, Stuart (1998). The Oxford Companion to Australian History. Oxford University Press. ISBN 0-19-553597-9.
- Edwards, John (1996). Keating, The Inside Story. Penguin. ISBN 0-14-026601-1.
- Hawke, Bob (1994). The Hawke Memoirs. Heinemann. ISBN 0-85561-502-8.
- Hurst, John (1983). Hawke PM. Angus & Robertson. ISBN 0-207-14806-6.
- Jaensch, Dean (1989). The Hawke-Keating Hijack. Allen and Unwin. ISBN 0-04-370192-2.
- Jaensch, Dean; Teichmann, Max (1992). The Macmillan Dictionary of Australian Politics.
- Kelly, Paul (1984). The Hawke ascendency: a definitive account of its origins and climax, 1975–1983. Angus & Robertson. ISBN 978-0-207-14727-2.
- Kelly, Paul (1992). The End of Certainty: The story of the 1980s. Allen & Unwin. ISBN 1-86373-227-6.
- Macklin, Robert (2017). Dragon and Kangaroo: Australia and China's Shared History from the Goldfields to the Present Day. Hachette Australia. pp. 273–286. Archived from the original on 29 September 2021.
- Mills, Stephen (1993). The Hawke Years. Viking. ISBN 0-670-84563-9.
- Richardson, Graham (1994). Whatever It Takes. Bantam. ISBN 1-86359-332-2.

Trade union offices
Preceded by Albert Monk	President of the Australian Council of Trade Unions; 1969–1980	Succeeded by Cliff Dolan
Parliament of Australia
Preceded by Gordon Bryant	Member for Wills; 1980–1992	Succeeded by Phil Cleary
Political offices
Preceded by Mick Young	Opposition Spokesperson on Industrial Relations, Employment and Youth Affairs; 1980–1983	Succeeded by Himself as Opposition Spokesperson on Industrial Relations
Preceded by Mick Young	Opposition Spokesperson on Industrial Relations, Employment and Youth Affairs; 1980–1983	Succeeded by Mick Young as Opposition Spokesperson on Immigration, Employment and Youth Affairs
Preceded by Himself as Opposition Spokesperson on Industrial Relations, Employment and Youth Affairs	Opposition Spokesperson on Industrial Relations; 1983	Succeeded by Ian Macphee as Shadow Minister for Employment and Industrial Relations
Preceded by Bill Hayden	Leader of the Opposition of Australia; 1983	Succeeded by Andrew Peacock
Preceded by Malcolm Fraser	Prime Minister of Australia; 1983–1991	Succeeded by Paul Keating
Party political offices
Preceded by Tom Burns	President of the Australian Labor Party National Executive; 1973–1978	Succeeded by Neil Batt
Preceded by Bill Hayden	Leader of the Australian Labor Party; 1983–1991	Succeeded by Paul Keating
