= Electoral results for the Division of Gellibrand =

Australian division election results

This is a list of electoral results for the Division of Gellibrand in Australian federal elections from the division's creation in 1949 until the present.

== Members ==
Member	Party	Term
Jack Mullens	Labor	1949–1955
Jack Mullens	Labor (A-C)	1955
Hector McIvor	Labor	1955–1972
Ralph Willis	Labor	1972–1998
Nicola Roxon	Labor	1998–2013
Tim Watts	Labor	2013–present

== Election results ==
=== Elections in the 2020s ===
==== 2025 ====
2025 Australian federal election: Gellibrand
Party	Candidate	Votes	%	±%
Labor	Tim Watts	49,044	46.62	+3.81
Liberal	Ben Reeson	27,539	26.18	−1.03
Greens	Ponraj Krishna Pandi	17,933	17.05	+1.47
One Nation	Stephen Bennett	6,290	5.98	+2.87
Family First	Jo Garcia	4,396	4.18	+4.18
Total formal votes		105,202	96.75	+1.72
Informal votes		3,538	3.25	−1.72
Turnout		108,740	91.41	+7.81
Two-party-preferred result
Labor	Tim Watts	68,489	65.10	+3.90
Liberal	Ben Reeson	36,713	34.90	−3.90
Labor hold		Swing	+3.90	

==== 2022 ====
2022 Australian federal election: Gellibrand
Party	Candidate	Votes	%	±%
Labor	Tim Watts	39,382	42.72	−6.30
Liberal	Monica Clark	24,869	26.97	−3.80
Greens	Suzette Rodoreda	15,241	16.53	+2.67
United Australia	Abraham Isac	5,080	5.51	−0.14
One Nation	Rob Braddock	2,802	3.04	+3.04
Liberal Democrats	Chloe Glasson	2,185	2.37	+2.37
Victorian Socialists	Andrew Charles	1,503	1.63	+1.63
Federation	Sharynn Moors	1,135	1.23	+1.23
Total formal votes		92,197	95.12	−1.25
Informal votes		4,729	4.88	+1.25
Turnout		96,926	89.67	−1.22
Two-party-preferred result
Labor	Tim Watts	56,738	61.54	−1.48
Liberal	Monica Clark	35,459	38.46	+1.48
Labor hold		Swing	−1.48	

Alluvial diagram for preference flows in the seat of Gellibrand in the 2022 federal election. indicates at what stage the winning candidate had over 50% of the votes and was declared the winner.

=== Elections in the 2010s ===
==== 2019 ====
2019 Australian federal election: Gellibrand
Party	Candidate	Votes	%	±%
Labor	Tim Watts	47,942	48.66	+2.43
Liberal	Anthony Mitchell	28,895	29.33	−0.46
Greens	Bernadette Thomas	16,303	16.55	−2.40
United Australia	Lisa Bentley	5,391	5.47	+5.47
Total formal votes		98,531	96.49	+0.40
Informal votes		3,582	3.51	−0.40
Turnout		102,113	91.83	+2.77
Two-party-preferred result
Labor	Tim Watts	63,878	64.83	−0.29
Liberal	Anthony Mitchell	34,653	35.17	+0.29
Labor hold		Swing	−0.29	

==== 2016 ====
2016 Australian federal election: Gellibrand
Party	Candidate	Votes	%	±%
Labor	Tim Watts	43,340	46.90	+0.86
Liberal	Ben Willis	24,607	26.63	−0.08
Greens	Jonathon Marsden	19,855	21.48	+4.75
Independent	David Tran	4,615	4.99	+4.99
Total formal votes		92,417	95.98	+1.60
Informal votes		3,868	4.02	−1.60
Turnout		96,285	88.77	−1.84
Two-party-preferred result
Labor	Tim Watts	63,060	68.23	+1.70
Liberal	Ben Willis	29,357	31.77	−1.70
Labor hold		Swing	+1.70	

==== 2013 ====
2013 Australian federal election: Gellibrand
Party	Candidate	Votes	%	±%
Labor	Tim Watts	40,236	46.04	−12.90
Liberal	David McConnell	23,343	26.71	+4.29
Greens	Rod Swift	14,623	16.73	+1.50
Palmer United	Dwayne Singleton	3,413	3.91	+3.91
Sex Party	Allan Cashion	2,540	2.91	+2.91
Family First	Kerry Arch	2,266	2.59	+0.21
Christians	Anthony O'Neill	967	1.11	+1.11
Total formal votes		87,388	94.38	−0.29
Informal votes		5,202	5.62	+0.29
Turnout		92,590	90.65	−0.91
Two-party-preferred result
Labor	Tim Watts	58,139	66.53	−7.60
Liberal	David McConnell	29,249	33.47	+7.60
Labor hold		Swing	−7.60	

==== 2010 ====
2010 Australian federal election: Gellibrand
Party	Candidate	Votes	%	±%
Labor	Nicola Roxon	48,971	58.81	−1.41
Liberal	David McConnell	19,070	22.90	+0.06
Greens	Rodney Solin	12,779	15.35	+5.97
Family First	Liz Mumby	1,440	1.73	−0.29
Socialist Alliance	Ben Courtice	528	0.63	−0.96
Socialist Equality	Tania Baptist	475	0.57	+0.57
Total formal votes		83,263	95.00	−0.78
Informal votes		4,378	5.00	+0.78
Turnout		87,641	91.66	−2.50
Two-party-preferred result
Labor	Nicola Roxon	61,531	73.90	+2.44
Liberal	David McConnell	21,732	26.10	−2.44
Labor hold		Swing	+2.44	

=== Elections in the 2000s ===
==== 2007 ====
2007 Australian federal election: Gellibrand
Party	Candidate	Votes	%	±%
Labor	Nicola Roxon	50,681	60.22	+5.60
Liberal	Wayne Tseng	19,220	22.84	−8.73
Greens	Robert Gibson	7,898	9.38	+0.30
Independent	Dave O'Neil	1,950	2.32	+2.32
Family First	Mukesh Garg	1,700	2.02	+0.18
Socialist Alliance	Ben Courtice	1,334	1.59	+0.95
Democrats	Rachel Richards	1,088	1.29	−0.01
Citizens Electoral Council	Rodney Doel	285	0.34	+0.15
Total formal votes		84,156	95.78	+2.35
Informal votes		3,712	4.22	−2.35
Turnout		87,868	94.20	+0.80
Two-party-preferred result
Labor	Nicola Roxon	60,134	71.46	+6.51
Liberal	Wayne Tseng	24,022	28.54	−6.51
Labor hold		Swing	+6.51	

==== 2004 ====
2004 Australian federal election: Gellibrand
Party	Candidate	Votes	%	±%
Labor	Nicola Roxon	43,383	54.62	−4.78
Liberal	David McConnell	25,069	31.57	+5.38
Greens	Nam Bui	7,210	9.08	+2.78
Family First	Michael Lee	1,463	1.84	+1.84
Democrats	Max Grarock	1,032	1.30	−5.91
Independent	Wajde Assaf	606	0.76	+0.76
Socialist Alliance	Linda Waldron	508	0.64	+0.64
Citizens Electoral Council	Kel Isherwood	149	0.19	+0.19
Total formal votes		79,420	93.43	−1.90
Informal votes		5,587	6.57	+1.90
Turnout		85,007	93.40	−0.47
Two-party-preferred result
Labor	Nicola Roxon	51,587	64.95	−5.46
Liberal	David McConnell	27,833	35.05	+5.46
Labor hold		Swing	−5.46	

==== 2001 ====
2001 Australian federal election: Gellibrand
Party	Candidate	Votes	%	±%
Labor	Nicola Roxon	46,124	60.40	−7.07
Liberal	Christopher Tann	19,191	25.13	+5.15
Democrats	Rachel Richards	5,256	6.88	+2.40
Greens	Michele Finey	4,831	6.33	+3.47
	Jorge Jorquera	963	1.26	+1.26
Total formal votes		76,365	95.10	−0.68
Informal votes		3,938	4.90	+0.68
Turnout		80,303	93.31	
Two-party-preferred result
Labor	Nicola Roxon	54,814	71.78	−4.13
Liberal	Christopher Tann	21,551	28.22	+4.13
Labor hold		Swing	−4.13	

=== Elections in the 1990s ===
==== 1998 ====
1998 Australian federal election: Gellibrand
Party	Candidate	Votes	%	±%
Labor	Nicola Roxon	51,443	67.47	+4.02
Liberal	Anthony Cursio	15,233	19.98	−1.81
Democrats	David Wark	3,420	4.49	−0.82
One Nation	Nikolas Kavalenka	2,638	3.46	+3.46
Greens	Liz Ingham	2,180	2.86	−0.44
Unity	Adrian Shorland	1,078	1.41	+1.41
Natural Law	Michael Pollock	249	0.33	−0.09
Total formal votes		76,241	95.78	+1.21
Informal votes		3,360	4.22	−1.21
Turnout		79,601	93.75	−0.61
Two-party-preferred result
Labor	Nicola Roxon	57,875	75.91	+4.68
Liberal	Anthony Cursio	18,366	24.09	−4.68
Labor hold		Swing	+4.68	

==== 1996 ====
1996 Australian federal election: Gellibrand
Party	Candidate	Votes	%	±%
Labor	Ralph Willis	46,533	63.45	−5.85
Liberal	John Best	15,978	21.79	−0.88
Democrats	Khiet Nguyen	3,889	5.30	+2.03
Greens	Janet Rice	2,440	3.33	+3.33
Call to Australia	Peter Sanko	1,630	2.22	+1.30
Independent	John Kelly	1,392	1.90	+1.90
AAFI	Luke Spencer	1,166	1.59	+1.59
Natural Law	Marco Andreacchio	306	0.42	−0.44
Total formal votes		73,334	94.57	−1.37
Informal votes		4,214	5.43	+1.37
Turnout		77,548	94.35	−0.70
Two-party-preferred result
Labor	Ralph Willis	51,902	71.23	−4.33
Liberal	John Best	20,965	28.77	+4.33
Labor hold		Swing	−4.33	

==== 1993 ====
1993 Australian federal election: Gellibrand
Party	Candidate	Votes	%	±%
Labor	Ralph Willis	47,968	69.11	+14.55
Liberal	Chris Macgregor	15,779	22.73	−3.79
Democrats	Alan Parker	2,275	3.28	−7.29
	Nada Benson	2,236	3.22	+3.22
Natural Law	Leon Staropoli	585	0.84	+0.84
Call to Australia	Peter Sanko	570	0.82	+0.82
Total formal votes		69,413	95.93	+2.47
Informal votes		2,944	4.07	−2.47
Turnout		72,357	95.05	
Two-party-preferred result
Labor	Ralph Willis	52,259	75.38	+6.87
Liberal	Chris Macgregor	17,072	24.62	−6.87
Labor hold		Swing	+6.87	

==== 1990 ====
1990 Australian federal election: Gellibrand
Party	Candidate	Votes	%	±%
Labor	Ralph Willis	36,267	54.6	−10.3
Liberal	Tim Warner	17,631	26.5	+2.0
Democrats	Frank Fichera	7,023	10.6	+4.4
Independent	Richard Phillips	2,487	3.7	+3.7
Independent	Don Veitch	1,593	2.4	+2.4
Democratic Socialist	Garry Walters	1,478	2.2	+2.2
Total formal votes		66,479	93.5	
Informal votes		4,649	6.5	
Turnout		71,128	94.7	
Two-party-preferred result
Labor	Ralph Willis	45,444	68.5	−2.1
Liberal	Tim Warner	20,888	31.5	+2.1
Labor hold		Swing	−2.1	

=== Elections in the 1980s ===
==== 1987 ====
1987 Australian federal election: Gellibrand
Party	Candidate	Votes	%	±%
Labor	Ralph Willis	38,451	64.9	−4.6
Liberal	Tim Warner	14,506	24.5	+0.5
Democrats	Susan Holmes	3,665	6.2	+2.5
Independent	Rosalba Vicari	1,569	2.6	+2.6
Socialist Workers	James Doughney	1,097	1.9	+0.8
Total formal votes		59,288	91.9	
Informal votes		5,245	8.1	
Turnout		64,533	93.4	
Two-party-preferred result
Labor	Ralph Willis	41,804	70.6	−2.8
Liberal	Tim Warner	17,390	29.4	+2.8
Labor hold		Swing	−2.8	

==== 1984 ====
1984 Australian federal election: Gellibrand
Party	Candidate	Votes	%	±%
Labor	Ralph Willis	40,777	69.5	−0.6
Liberal	Christopher Gowing	14,073	24.0	+2.7
Democrats	Shirley Bold	2,148	3.7	−0.3
Democratic Labor	Margaret Reed	982	1.7	+1.7
Socialist Workers	James Doughney	672	1.1	−3.1
Total formal votes		58,652	88.1	
Informal votes		7,913	11.9	
Turnout		66,565	94.6	
Two-party-preferred result
Labor	Ralph Willis	43,000	73.3	−2.2
Liberal	Christopher Gowing	15,624	26.7	+2.2
Labor hold		Swing	−2.2	

==== 1983 ====
1983 Australian federal election: Gellibrand
Party	Candidate	Votes	%	±%
Labor	Ralph Willis	47,412	70.4	+4.9
Liberal	Peter Goudge	14,120	21.0	−1.2
Socialist Workers	James Doughney	2,842	4.2	+0.8
Democrats	Barry McLeod	2,695	4.0	−5.0
Australian National Party	Augustus Titter	304	0.5	+0.5
Total formal votes		67,373	96.2	
Informal votes		2,678	3.8	
Turnout		70,051	95.4	
Two-party-preferred result
Labor	Ralph Willis		75.9	+2.5
Liberal	Peter Goudge		24.1	−2.5
Labor hold		Swing	+2.5	

==== 1980 ====
1980 Australian federal election: Gellibrand
Party	Candidate	Votes	%	±%
Labor	Ralph Willis	43,474	65.5	+7.2
Liberal	John Kelly	14,711	22.2	−0.9
Democrats	Shirley Bold	5,955	9.0	+0.4
Socialist Workers	Lynne Bryer	2,268	3.4	+3.4
Total formal votes		66,408	94.4	
Informal votes		3,184	4.6	
Turnout		69,592	95.0	
Two-party-preferred result
Labor	Ralph Willis		73.4	+8.9
Liberal	John Kelly		26.6	−8.9
Labor hold		Swing	+8.9	

=== Elections in the 1970s ===
==== 1977 ====
1977 Australian federal election: Gellibrand
Party	Candidate	Votes	%	±%
Labor	Ralph Willis	38,433	58.3	−3.1
Liberal	Anton Zajc	15,241	23.1	−6.6
Democratic Labor	Bert Bailey	6,606	10.0	+1.0
Democrats	June Smith	5,663	8.6	+8.6
Total formal votes		65,943	95.2	
Informal votes		3,295	4.8	
Turnout		69,238	95.6	
Two-party-preferred result
Labor	Ralph Willis		64.5	+2.3
Liberal	Anton Zajc		35.5	−2.3
Labor hold		Swing	+2.3	

==== 1975 ====
1975 Australian federal election: Gellibrand
Party	Candidate	Votes	%	±%
Labor	Ralph Willis	32,669	61.4	−4.5
Liberal	Iris Williams	15,779	29.7	+7.2
Democratic Labor	Bert Bailey	4,769	9.0	−0.3
Total formal votes		53,217	97.1	
Informal votes		1,591	2.9	
Turnout		54,808	95.5	
Two-party-preferred result
Labor	Ralph Willis		62.2	−5.9
Liberal	Iris Williams		37.8	+5.9
Labor hold		Swing	−5.9	

==== 1974 ====
1974 Australian federal election: Gellibrand
Party	Candidate	Votes	%	±%
Labor	Ralph Willis	35,578	65.9	+1.5
Liberal	Cecile Storey	12,158	22.5	−3.1
Democratic Labor	Bert Bailey	5,009	9.3	−0.7
Australia	Veronica Schwarz	1,252	2.3	+2.3
Total formal votes		53,997	96.3	
Informal votes		2,054	3.7	
Turnout		56,051	95.7	
Two-party-preferred result
Labor	Ralph Willis		68.1	+2.7
Liberal	Cecile Storey		31.9	−2.7
Labor hold		Swing	+2.7	

==== 1972 ====
1972 Australian federal election: Gellibrand
Party	Candidate	Votes	%	±%
Labor	Ralph Willis	32,029	64.4	+2.1
Liberal	David Munro	12,722	25.6	+1.4
Democratic Labor	Robin Thomas	4,951	10.0	−3.5
Total formal votes		49,702	96.0	
Informal votes		2,056	4.0	
Turnout		51,758	95.1	
Two-party-preferred result
Labor	Ralph Willis		65.4	+1.7
Liberal	David Munro		34.6	−1.7
Labor hold		Swing	+1.7	

=== Elections in the 1960s ===
==== 1969 ====
1969 Australian federal election: Gellibrand
Party	Candidate	Votes	%	±%
Labor	Hector McIvor	31,458	62.3	+8.0
Liberal	Ian Crouch	12,245	24.2	−1.2
Democratic Labor	Robin Thomas	6,798	13.5	+1.2
Total formal votes		50,501	94.7	
Informal votes		2,849	5.3	
Turnout		53,350	95.4	
Two-party-preferred result
Labor	Hector McIvor		63.7	+1.9
Liberal	Ian Crouch		36.3	−1.9
Labor hold		Swing	+1.9	

==== 1966 ====
1966 Australian federal election: Gellibrand
Party	Candidate	Votes	%	±%
Labor	Hector McIvor	19,913	55.3	−8.9
Liberal	John McArthur	8,777	24.4	+3.4
Democratic Labor	Robin Thomas	4,426	12.3	+1.1
Communist	Ian Daykin	2,890	8.0	+4.4
Total formal votes		36,006	94.1	
Informal votes		2,274	5.9	
Turnout		38,280	95.9	
Two-party-preferred result
Labor	Hector McIvor		62.8	−5.9
Liberal	John McArthur		37.2	+5.9
Labor hold		Swing	−5.9	

==== 1963 ====
1963 Australian federal election: Gellibrand
Party	Candidate	Votes	%	±%
Labor	Hector McIvor	25,035	64.2	−0.9
Liberal	Harley Price	8,183	21.0	+0.6
Democratic Labor	Jan Roszkowski	4,375	11.2	−0.7
Communist	David Davies	1,395	3.6	+1.1
Total formal votes		38,988	97.0	
Informal votes		1,193	3.0	
Turnout		40,181	96.6	
Two-party-preferred result
Labor	Hector McIvor		68.7	+0.2
Liberal	Harley Price		31.3	−0.2
Labor hold		Swing	+0.2	

==== 1961 ====
1961 Australian federal election: Gellibrand
Party	Candidate	Votes	%	±%
Labor	Hector McIvor	25,634	65.1	+2.1
Liberal	Reginald Cannon	8,031	20.4	+2.3
Democratic Labor	Jan Roszkowski	4,691	11.9	−5.1
Communist	Frank Johnson	1,000	2.5	+0.6
Total formal votes		39,356	96.5	
Informal votes		1,439	3.5	
Turnout		40,795	96.2	
Two-party-preferred result
Labor	Hector McIvor		68.5	+2.0
Liberal	Reginald Cannon		31.5	−2.0
Labor hold		Swing	+2.0	

=== Elections in the 1950s ===
==== 1958 ====
1958 Australian federal election: Gellibrand
Party	Candidate	Votes	%	±%
Labor	Hector McIvor	25,054	63.0	+1.6
Liberal	Barry Maddern	7,211	18.1	−4.0
Democratic Labor	James Eudey	6,760	17.0	+2.5
Communist	Frank Johnson	758	1.9	−0.1
Total formal votes		39,783	96.4	
Informal votes		1,465	3.6	
Turnout		41,248	96.3	
Two-party-preferred result
Labor	Hector McIvor		66.5	+0.4
Liberal	Barry Maddern		33.5	−0.4
Labor hold		Swing	+0.4	

==== 1955 ====
1955 Australian federal election: Gellibrand
Party	Candidate	Votes	%	±%
Labor	Hector McIvor	24,324	61.4	−10.0
Liberal	John Bown	8,741	22.1	−2.0
Labor (A-C)	James Eudey	5,733	14.5	+14.5
Communist	Frank Johnson	788	2.0	−2.3
Total formal votes		39,586	96.0	
Informal votes		1,654	4.0	
Turnout		41,240	95.2	
Two-party-preferred result
Labor	Hector McIvor		66.1	−9.1
Liberal	John Bown		33.9	+9.1
Labor hold		Swing	−9.1	

==== 1954 ====
1954 Australian federal election: Gellibrand
Party	Candidate	Votes	%	±%
Labor	John Mullens	25,637	66.7	+1.8
Liberal	George Carrington	10,235	26.6	+1.6
Communist	Alex Dobbin	2,584	6.7	−3.3
Total formal votes		38,456	98.5	
Informal votes		605	1.5	
Turnout		39,061	96.3	
Two-party-preferred result
Labor	John Mullens		72.8	−1.6
Liberal	George Carrington		27.2	+1.6
Labor hold		Swing	−1.6	

==== 1951 ====
1951 Australian federal election: Gellibrand
Party	Candidate	Votes	%	±%
Labor	John Mullens	25,863	64.9	+13.6
Liberal	Gordon Trewin	9,973	25.0	−2.8
Communist	Alex Dobbin	4,003	10.0	+6.5
Total formal votes		39,839	97.8	
Informal votes		896	2.2	
Turnout		40,735	96.5	
Two-party-preferred result
Labor	John Mullens		74.4	+4.7
Liberal	Gordon Trewin		25.6	−4.7
Labor hold		Swing	+4.7	

=== Elections in the 1940s ===
==== 1949 ====
1949 Australian federal election: Gellibrand
Party	Candidate	Votes	%	±%
Labor	John Mullens	20,519	51.3	−22.5
Liberal	William Massey	8,904	22.2	−4.0
Independent Labor	Angus Macdonald	6,323	15.8	+15.8
Independent	William Anderson	2,865	7.2	+7.2
Communist	John Arrowsmith	1,418	3.5	+3.5
Total formal votes		40,029	97.5	
Informal votes		1,011	2.5	
Turnout		41,040	97.1	
Two-party-preferred result
Labor	John Mullens		69.7	−4.1
Liberal	William Massey		30.3	+4.1
Labor notional hold		Swing	−4.1	
