= October surprise =

Event that may influence a US election

In United States politics, an October surprise is a news event that may influence the outcome of an upcoming November election (particularly one for the presidency), whether deliberately planned or spontaneously occurring. Because the date for national elections (as well as many state and local elections) is in early November (with in-person early voting, absentee, and mail-in voting also generally taking place in most states during the period of late-September to early November), events that take place in October have greater potential to influence the decisions of prospective voters and allow less time to take remedial action; thus, relatively last-minute news stories could either change the course of an election or reinforce the inevitable. Common political events that have been referred to as an October surprise include political scandals, sudden international crises, criminal investigations, health issues involving a candidate, news leaks, natural disasters, and major policy announcements.

The term "October surprise" was coined by William Casey when he served as campaign manager of Ronald Reagan's 1980 presidential campaign; however, there were October election-upending events that predated the coining of the term.

== Prior to 1980 ==
=== 19th century ===
In mid-October 1840, shortly before the 1840 presidential election, federal prosecutors announced plans to charge top Whig Party officials with "most stupendous and atrocious fraud" for paying Pennsylvanians to cross state lines and vote for Whig candidates in New York during the 1838 elections. Whig candidate William Henry Harrison later won the election.

In 1844, an abolitionist newspaper published an article, purportedly based on a book titled Roorback's Tour Through the Southern and Western States in the Year 1836, implying that James K. Polk (who later won the election) had his slaves branded. For some decades afterward, a practice similar to the modern "October surprise", in which the occurrence turned out to be untrue, was called "roorbacking" or "roorbaching".

On October 20, 1880, shortly before the 1880 presidential election, a forged letter was published purportedly written by James A. Garfield voicing support for Chinese immigration to the United States. At the time, most white Americans opposed Chinese immigration and both presidential candidates were in favor of immigration restrictions. Garfield later won the election.

In the week leading up to the 1884 presidential election, Republican nominee James G. Blaine attended a meeting in which Presbyterian preacher Samuel D. Burchard claimed that the Democrats were the party of "Rum, Romanism, and Rebellion". Blaine's failure to object to Burchard's message cost him support from anti-prohibitionists, Roman Catholic immigrants, and southerners, playing a role in his narrow loss to Democratic candidate Grover Cleveland.

Two weeks before the 1888 presidential election, the Republicans published a letter by Lionel Sackville-West, the British ambassador to the United States. In the letter, Sackville-West suggested that Democratic presidential candidate Grover Cleveland was preferred as president from the British point of view. The letter had a galvanizing effect on Irish-American voters exactly comparable to the "Rum, Romanism, and Rebellion" blunder of the previous presidential election by trumpeting Great Britain's support for the Democrats. That drove Irish-American voters into the Republican fold, and Cleveland lost the presidency to Republican candidate Benjamin Harrison.

=== 20th century ===
In the weeks leading up to the 1920 presidential election, rumors circulated that Warren G. Harding was of African-American descent. Harding's campaign feared that the rumor would affect his popularity amongst white southerners and sought to prove Harding's whiteness. Harding later won the election.

Less than a month before the 1940 presidential election, President Roosevelt's press secretary Stephen Early kneed a black police officer in the groin outside Madison Square Garden. Roosevelt had already been facing skepticism from black voters because of his failure to desegregate the military. Roosevelt responded days before the election by appointing the nation's first black general, Benjamin O. Davis Sr., and announcing the creation of the Tuskegee Airmen. He later won the election.

The Suez Crisis and Hungarian Revolution have both been described as October surprises during the 1956 presidential election. Republican Dwight D. Eisenhower was reelected in the 1956 presidential election.

On October 7, 1964, just under a month before the 1964 presidential election, one of President Johnson's top aides, Walter Jenkins, was arrested for disorderly conduct with another man (homosexual activity) at the Washington D.C. YMCA, a place described by the Toledo Blade as "so notorious a gathering place of homosexuals that the District police had long since staked it out with peepholes for surveillance". Johnson later won the election.

During the 1968 presidential election, Hubert Humphrey—who was rising sharply in the polls due to the collapse of the George Wallace vote—began to distance himself publicly from the Johnson administration on the Vietnam War, calling for a bombing halt. The key turning point for Humphrey's campaign came when President Johnson officially announced a bombing halt, and even a possible peace deal, the weekend before the election. The "Halloween Peace" gave Humphrey's campaign a badly needed boost. In addition, Senator Eugene McCarthy finally endorsed Humphrey in late October after previously refusing to do so, and by election day the polls were reporting a dead heat. However, Nixon won the election in a close race.

During the 1972 presidential election between the Republican incumbent Richard Nixon and the Democratic nominee George McGovern, the United States was in the fourth year of negotiations to end the lengthy and domestically divisive Vietnam War. On October 26, 1972, twelve days before the election on November 7, the United States' chief negotiator and presidential National Security Advisor Henry Kissinger appeared at a press conference held at the White House and announced "We believe that peace is at hand." Nixon, despite having vowed to end the war during his presidential election campaign four years earlier, had failed to cease hostilities but had withdrawn all American ground combat units and most other American military personnel. While Nixon was nevertheless already widely considered to be assured of re-election, Kissinger's "peace is at hand" declaration increased Nixon's already high standing with the electorate: in the event, Nixon defeated McGovern in every state except Massachusetts and won by 23.2 points in the nationwide popular vote, which was the largest margin since 1936. Remaining U.S. military personnel were withdrawn in 1973, but U.S. involvement in Vietnam continued until 1975.

== 1980 presidential election ==
=== Origin of term ===
In the 1980 presidential election, Republican challenger Ronald Reagan feared that a last-minute deal to release American hostages held in Iran might earn incumbent Jimmy Carter enough votes to win re-election. As it happened, in the days prior to the election, press coverage was consumed with the Iranian government's decision—and Carter's simultaneous announcement—that the hostages would not be released until after the election.

William Casey, the manager of the Reagan campaign, was the first person to mention the idea of an "October surprise" to the press. On the morning of July 17, he told the press at the Republican convention that he was concerned that Carter would use the advantage of incumbency to spring an event that would benefit him politically. Casey mentioned that Carter had done this during the Wisconsin primary—in reference to Carter's announcement on election morning that he had "good news" concerning the hostages. Casey mentioned to the press that he was setting up an "intelligence operation" to monitor Carter's political activities to keep abreast of such a possibility.

The intelligence operation the Reagan campaign set up was extensive. It used military contacts at key air force bases to keep track of military flight movement which could be used to gauge government action concerning the hostages. The operation had also compiled a list of the embargoed military equipment that the U.S. government had of the Iranians that Carter could use to barter in exchange for the release of the hostages. To keep abreast of international information concerning the hostages, the Reagan campaign tapped former Secretary of State Henry Kissinger and his extensive network of international contacts.

The Reagan campaign's ominous warnings of a possible October surprise to the press was done for strategic reasons. It was intended to prepare the voters, so that if some good October news happened, the voters would look at the event as a political ploy by the Carter campaign to win the election. Personal papers left by Joseph V. Reed Jr. indicate that the "team" around David Rockefeller, the chairman of Chase Bank, "collaborated closely with the Reagan campaign in its efforts to pre-empt and discourage what it derisively labeled an 'October surprise'—a pre-election release of the American hostages, the papers show. The Chase team helped the Reagan campaign gather and spread rumors about possible payoffs to win the release, a propaganda effort that Carter administration officials have said impeded talks to free the captives." Rockefeller, a lifelong Republican, assisted the Reagan campaign because he had a negative view on Carter's dovish foreign policy, and also because Chase Bank's balance sheet held $360 million (equivalent to $1.18 billion in 2025) in loans to Iran and more than $500 million (equivalent to $1.64 billion in 2025) in frozen Iranian deposits.

Jack Anderson wrote an article in The Washington Post in the fall of 1980 about a possible October surprise, in which he alleged that the Carter administration was preparing a major military operation in Iran for rescuing U.S. hostages in order to help him get re-elected. Subsequent allegations surfaced against Reagan alleging that his team had actively impeded the hostage release.

=== Secret deal accusation ===
After the release of the hostages on January 20, 1981, minutes after Reagan's inauguration, some charged that the Reagan campaign had made a secret deal with the Iranian government whereby the Iranians would hold the hostages until after Reagan was elected and inaugurated. Gary Sick, member of the U.S. National Security Council under Presidents Ford and Carter (before being relieved of his duties weeks into Reagan's term), made the accusation in a New York Times editorial in the run-up to the 1992 election. The initial bipartisan response from Congress was skeptical: House Democrats refused to authorize an inquiry, and Senate Republicans denied a $600,000 appropriation for a probe. Eight former hostages also sent an open letter demanding an inquiry in 1991. In subsequent Congressional testimony, Sick said that the popular media had distorted and misrepresented the accusers, reducing them to "gross generalizations" and "generic conspiracy theorists". Sick penned a book on the subject and sold the film rights to it for a reported $300,000. His sources and thesis were contested by a number of commentators on both sides of the aisle.

Abolhassan Banisadr, the former President of Iran, has also stated "that the Reagan campaign struck a deal with Tehran to delay the release of the hostages in 1980", asserting that "by the month before the American Presidential election in November 1980, many in Iran's ruling circles were openly discussing the fact that a deal had been made between the Reagan campaign team and some Iranian religious leaders in which the hostages' release would be delayed until after the election so as to prevent President Carter's re-election." He repeated the charge in My Turn to Speak: Iran, the Revolution & Secret Deals with the U.S. Former Lieutenant Governor of Texas Ben Barnes asserts that during the 1980 election campaign, he accompanied Connally on a trip through several Middle Eastern capitals, during which Connally consistently conveyed to regional leaders that they should inform the Iranian government that Iran should wait to release American hostages until after the election. Upon their return to the U.S., Barnes claims that Connally briefed Casey on their trip in an airport lounge.

Four people identified by Barnes confirmed to a reporter for The New York Times that Barnes had conveyed these incidents to them in the years before Barnes went public with his story: Mark K. Updegrove, former director of the Lyndon Baines Johnson Library and Museum, Tom Johnson, one of LBJ's aides, Larry Temple, one of Connally's and Johnson's aides, and H.W. Brands, an historian at the University of Texas. Moreover, Brands wrote about Barnes's story in his 2015 biography of Reagan, although the account went largely unnoticed at the time; however, The New York Times also observed that "Confirming Mr. Barnes's account is problematic" and the fact that John Connally III said he was with his father when he briefed Reagan about the trip, and nothing on this subject was discussed.

Barbara Honegger, a 1980 Reagan–Bush campaign staffer and later a Reagan White House policy analyst, claims to have discovered information that made her believe that George H. W. Bush and William Casey had conspired to assure that Iran would not free the U.S. hostages until Jimmy Carter had been defeated in the 1980 presidential election, and she alleges that arms sales to Iran were a part of that bargain. Two separate congressional investigations looked into the charges, both concluding that there was no plan to seek to delay the hostages' release.

== 1992 presidential election ==
In June 1992, Ronald Reagan's Secretary of Defense Caspar Weinberger was indicted in the Iran–Contra affair. Although he claims to have been opposed to the sale on principle, Weinberger participated in the transfer of United States TOW missiles to Iran that were used to stop Saddam Hussein's massive tank army, and was later indicted on several felony charges of lying to the Iran-Contra independent counsel during its investigation. Republicans angrily accused Independent Counsel Lawrence E. Walsh of timing Weinberger's indictment to hurt George H. W. Bush's re-election chances. Throughout the campaign as Weinberger's trial approached, more concrete information on Bush's direct role emerged, including statements by Reagan Middle East specialist Howard Teicher that Bush knew of the arms deal in spring 1986 and an Israeli memo that made it clear that Bush was well versed in the deal by July 1986.

== 2000 presidential election ==
Days before the November 7 election, Thomas J. Connolly of Scarborough, Maine, a prominent defense attorney and 1998 Democratic candidate for governor, confirmed to a reporter that Republican presidential candidate George W. Bush had been arrested for drunk driving in that state in 1976. Bush confirmed the report in a press conference moments after it was revealed.

== 2003 California gubernatorial recall election ==
On October 2, 2003, the Los Angeles Times released a story about Arnold Schwarzenegger and subsequent allegations that he was a womanizer guilty of multiple acts of sexual misconduct in past decades. The story was released just before the 2003 California recall (which was scheduled for October 7), prompting many pundits to charge that the timing of the story was aimed specifically at derailing the recall campaign. The following day, ABC News and The New York Times reported that in 1975 Schwarzenegger had praised Adolf Hitler during interviews for the film Pumping Iron, which was responsible for the bodybuilder-turned-actor's fame. The twin controversies later led Los Angeles Times columnist Steve Lopez to coin the term "gropenfuhrer" to describe California's governor-elect (a compounded pun on the Nazi paramilitary rank Gruppenführer and the words to grope and Führer); a series of Doonesbury strips made the term famous.

== 2004 presidential election ==
On October 27, The New York Times reported the disappearance of a huge cache of explosives from a warehouse in al Qa'qaa (the missing explosives in Iraq). The John Kerry campaign blamed the Bush administration for this supposed mismanagement; administration officials charged that the Times had gotten the story wrong, and that the explosives had been cleared from the storage facility before the looting was supposed to have taken place.

On October 29, the Arabic news agency Al Jazeera aired a video of Osama bin Laden. In a speech that justified and took responsibility for the actions of September 11, bin Laden called out the Bush administration and the American position in the Israeli–Palestinian conflict. Bin Laden was quoted as saying: "Your security does not lie in the hands of Kerry, Bush, or al-Qaeda. Your security is in your own hands." This is believed to have helped President Bush's campaign as it thrust the war on terror back into the public eye. There is debate as to whether bin Laden was aware of the effect the video would have on the elections; the "Bush bounce" from the video did not surprise most outside observers of the 2004 election. It has been claimed that Saudi Prince Bandar bin Sultan Al Saud cut the price of oil (thus reducing gas prices) to help ensure a Bush victory. According to a 60 Minutes broadcast, "Prince Bandar enjoys easy access to the Oval Office. His family and the Bush family are close. And Woodward told us that Bandar has promised the president that Saudi Arabia will lower oil prices in the months before the election to ensure the U.S. economy is strong on Election Day."

== 2006 midterm elections ==
Two studies by The Lancet on mortality in Iraq before and after the 2003 invasion of Iraq have been described as October surprises for the 2004 and 2006 elections. Les Roberts acknowledged that the 2004 study was timed to appear just before the presidential election, though he denied that it was meant to favor one candidate over another. Although the studies used standard epidemiological methods, was peer-reviewed and supported by a majority of statisticians and epidemiologists, political critics have dismissed the studies based on a variety of alleged shortcomings.

The Mark Foley scandal, in which the congressman resigned over sexual computer messages that he exchanged with underage congressional pages, broke on September 28, 2006, and dominated the news in early October. Bloomberg.com wrote, "The October surprise came early this election year...." Allegations that both Republicans and Democrats had knowledge of Foley's actions months before the breaking of the story only fueled the speculation regarding the possibly politically motivated timing of the story's release.

News that the Saddam Hussein trial verdict would be rendered on November 5, 2006, just two days ahead of the U.S. midterm elections, led Tom Engelhardt of magazine The Nation to dub it, on October 17, the "November Surprise". In a White House Press gaggle on November 4, 2006, a reporter suggested that the timing of the verdict might be an attempt to influence the outcome of the November election, to which White House Press Secretary Tony Snow replied "Are you smoking rope?" Snow later told CNN's Late Edition, "The idea is preposterous, that somehow we've been scheming and plotting with the Iraqis".

== 2008 presidential election ==
On October 31, 2008, four days before the 2008 presidential election, the Associated Press reported that Zeituni Onyango, half-aunt of Democratic candidate Barack Obama, was living as an illegal immigrant in Boston. She had been denied asylum and ordered to leave the United States in 2004.

Some have also described the stock market crash and October 2008 record rise in unemployment as an "October Surprise", although the downturn in the American and global stock markets started in September.

== 2012 presidential election ==
Hurricane Sandy was labeled the October surprise by some in the media at the time, though there some researchers found no evidence that it impacted the outcome of the election after the fact.

== 2014 midterm elections ==
The Ebola virus epidemic was considered an October surprise by some media outlets.

== 2016 presidential election ==
=== Access Hollywood tape ===
On October 7, a recording from 2005 was released in which Republican Party nominee Donald Trump, using explicit language in a conversation with Access Hollywood anchor Billy Bush (nephew of Republican President George H. W. Bush and first cousin of Republican President George W. Bush and his brother, Republican former Florida governor and 2016 primary candidate Jeb Bush), stated "when you're a star, they let you do it. You can do anything... Grab them by the pussy. You can do anything." Several politicians from both major parties expressed their disapproval of these remarks. Trump, who had been accused of sexism on several occasions before, later apologized for these remarks, saying they "don't reflect who I am."

The remarks led to many Republicans withdrawing their endorsement of Trump, including Arizona Senator John McCain, New Hampshire Senator Kelly Ayotte, and Carly Fiorina. Many others who had not previously endorsed him asked him to step aside as the Republican nominee, including former Secretary of State Condoleezza Rice.

=== WikiLeaks ===
Also, on October 7, WikiLeaks began a two-month campaign to release emails and excerpts from John Podesta's account. They would later become known as the Podesta Leaks. They shed a negative light on Democratic Party nominee Hillary Clinton and included recordings of excerpts of speeches given by Clinton to a variety of banks, a debate question being leaked to Clinton before the debate, a stance on trade deals different from those purported by Clinton during her campaign, along with her belief that it is beneficial to hold both public and private beliefs.

=== James Comey investigation ===
Three weeks later, on October 28, then-FBI Director James Comey announced in a letter to Congress that he would take "appropriate investigative steps" to review additional emails related to Hillary Clinton's use of a private email server. This was announced after newly discovered emails were found on a computer that the FBI seized during an investigation of former congressman Anthony Weiner, who had been accused of sending explicit pictures to a minor. According to law enforcement officials, the emails were found on a computer used by both Weiner and his then-wife, top Clinton aide Huma Abedin. Several hours later, Hillary Clinton responded to the decision of the Director by calling on the FBI to be fully transparent and to release "full and complete facts" on what the emails contained. On October 30, it was reported that 650,000 emails on Weiner's computer were to be investigated, potentially being relevant to this particular and other cases. Almost all ended up being duplicates, and when Comey revealed that the investigation found nothing on November 6, some Clinton aides later worried that it put the emails back in the news cycle two days before the election. Comey also received criticism for only publicly disclosing the Clinton email investigations and keeping quiet about the inquiry into Russian attempts to boost Donald Trump. A 2018 inspector general report of the decision to reopen the investigation in October described it as "a serious error in judgment." Daniel Drezner argued it was the greatest October surprise of the modern presidency.

== 2018 midterm elections ==
A caravan of migrants from Central America became the "October surprise" of 2018. President Trump tweeted false information about the caravan and later released a Republican television advertisement that many criticized as racist (Fox News, NBC, and Facebook removed the ad after they deemed it racist, and CNN refused to air it). The story dominated discussion on many news networks, with many pundits criticizing Trump. News host Shepard Smith said on his Fox News show that the migrant caravan "hysteria" was actually intended to stoke fear before the midterm election and ridiculed Trump's false claims.

== 2020 presidential election ==
On October 2, Trump announced that he and Melania Trump had tested positive for COVID-19. This was considered by some after the event to be an October surprise, and this positive diagnosis was part of a more significant outbreak that occurred in the White House in October 2020 and had been traced back to the fast-tracked ceremony to announce Amy Coney Barrett as the successor to Ruth Bader Ginsburg's Supreme Court seat. Infectious disease expert Anthony Fauci has described the event as a "super spreader" event that reportedly infected over 30 people, including senior White House officials. The Economist argued that the polling shift from the COVID case was erased before election day, arguing it was likely not an October surprise.

An October 14 article by the New York Post about emails found on an external hard drive of a laptop computer belonging to Joe Biden's son Hunter was considered an October surprise. However, NBC News described it as a "failed one."

== 2022 midterm elections ==
On October 3, 2022, The Daily Beast reported that former football player Herschel Walker, the Republican nominee in the 2022 United States Senate election in Georgia, paid for his wife's 2009 abortion despite claiming to be "100% pro-life". Walker's son Christian, who has a large following as a right-wing social media influencer, additionally stated that the woman whose abortion Walker paid for was Christian's mother. Christian Walker additionally slammed his father's comments on being a "family man", claiming Herschel Walker "left us to bang a bunch of women, threatened to kill us, and had us move over 6 times in 6 months running from [his] violence", additionally revealing that Herschel Walker's family had never wanted him to run for office. Walker narrowly lost to Raphael Warnock in a runoff election.

== 2024 presidential election ==
On October 27, at a Donald Trump rally at Madison Square Garden in New York City, comedian Tony Hinchcliffe described the U.S. territory of Puerto Rico as a "floating island of garbage"; the remarks were considered to be a potential October surprise due to its impact on Puerto Rican voters, especially in Pennsylvania, a key battleground state with half a million Puerto Ricans. A poll among Latino voters in Pennsylvania showed that 69% of respondents found the joke to be "more racist than humorous," and 51% indicated that the remarks at the Trump rally influenced their voting preferences toward Harris.

However, this did not prove to impact Trump, who would go on to take Pennsylvania and clinch a second term as president; his overall support from Latino voters had also increased.

== 2026 midterm elections ==
On October 9, 2026, President Trump announced a deal to obtain diesel from Russia to potentially lower gas prices. This move was seen as an October surprise by some, as it was seen as a move by Trump to abandon Ukraine and its European allies to instead align with Russia in the Russo-Ukrainian war.

A campaign ad for Vivek Ramaswamy in the 2026 Ohio gubernatorial election was deemed an October surprise by The Washington Post. The TV ad featured Democratic candidate Amy Acton's estranged mother, who lost custody of her when she was 12 years old due to Acton being sexually assaulted by her mother's boyfriend. In the ad, Acton's mother accuses her of lying about being sexually assaulted as a child. The video was widely condemned by multiple politicians across both parties, including incumbent governor Mike DeWine.

On October 26, 2026, Haley Stevens, who lost the 2026 Michigan Senate Democratic Primary to Dr. Abdul El-Sayed by less than a point, called on El-Sayed to denounce an advertisement aired by Rebellion PAC which she claims contained antisemitic rhetoric. El-Sayed denounced the ad, but asked Stevens to stay away from future campaign events, and she was privately urged not to show up to a unity event with Jim Clyburn through her colleague Debbie Dingell. On the morning of November 1, 2026, Stevens formally endorsed El-Sayed's Republican opponent, Mike Rogers, in a move that was widely condemned by her party and resulted in her expulsion from the Michigan Democratic Party.

== Impact on outcome ==
The October surprise has been subject to debate due to its inconsistency in affecting the overall outcome. The increased prevalence of early, absentee, and mail-in voting has meant that many votes may have already been cast. In addition, in elections that see high political polarization, a candidate's supporters may be unswayed by an October surprise event affecting their candidate. They view it as politically-motivated content or fake news, and sometimes view it positively in relation to their candidate instead. As a result, an October surprise generally matters less in relation to partisan and wide margin elections, and matters more in close elections with many undecided voters. Some October surprises may also fail to capture public attention, especially if accompanied by other major news events unrelated to the election.

Some political campaigns may release as many small pieces of opposition research as possible in October, in an attempt to sway undecided and swing voters.

== See also ==
- Foreign interference in United States elections
- Opposition research

=== Related works or historical examples ===
- Canadian Bacon, a film about a fictional war to distract attention from a presidential scandal
- Ralph Willis letter, a forgery which influenced the 1996 Australian federal election
- Wag the Dog, a novel and film describing a fictional war started solely to distract attention from a presidential scandal
- Zinoviev letter, a forgery which influenced the 1924 United Kingdom general election
