= Herschel Walker =

American diplomat and former football player (born 1962)

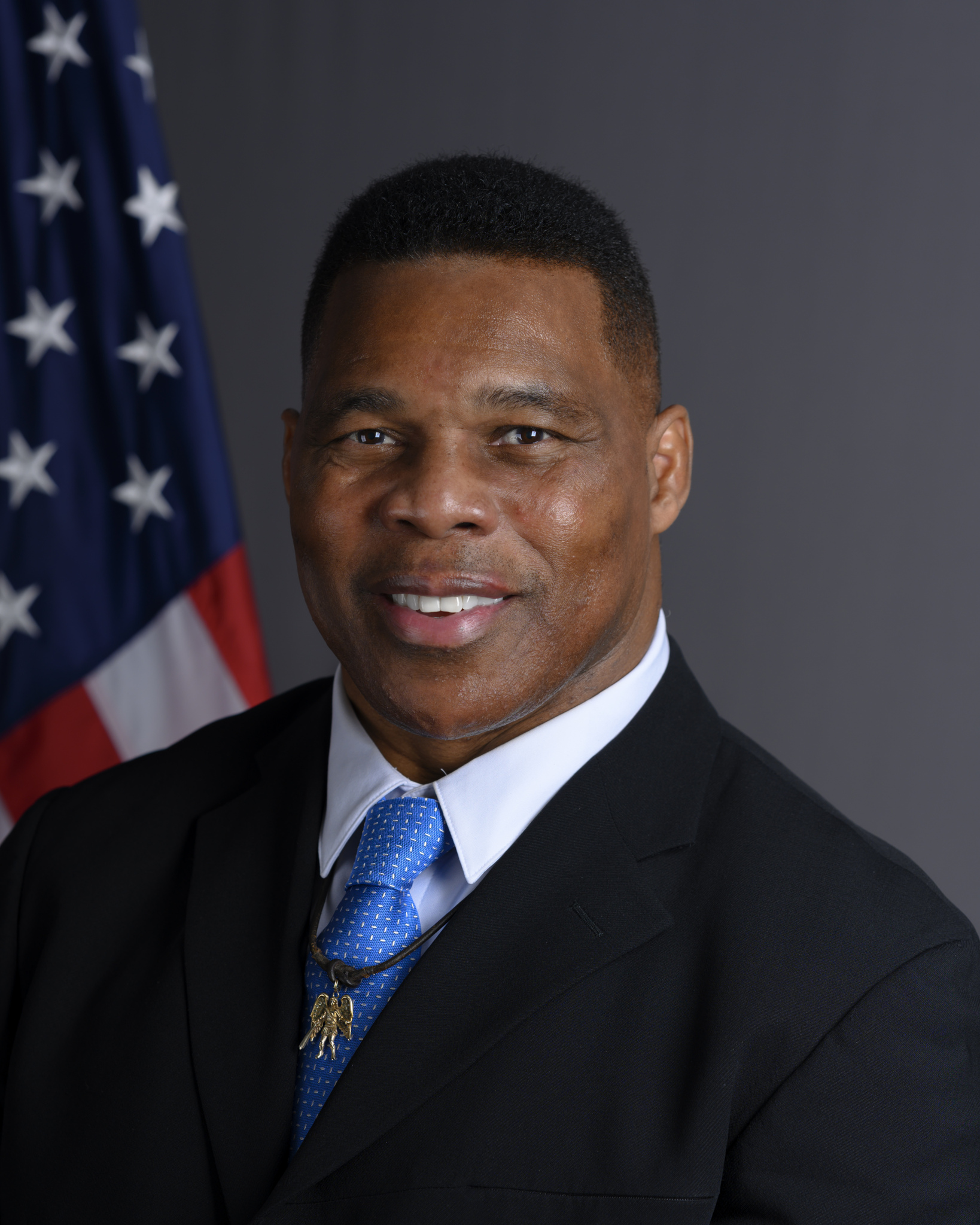
- Official portrait, 2025

14th United States Ambassador to the Bahamas
- Incumbent
- Assumed office December 9, 2025
- President: Donald Trump
- Preceded by: Nicole Avant (2011)

Co-Chair of the President's Council on Physical Fitness and Sports
- In office 2018–2022
- President: Donald Trump; Joe Biden
- Preceded by: Dominique Dawes; Drew Brees
- Succeeded by: Elena Delle Donne; José Andrés

Personal details
- Born: Herschel Junior Walker; March 3, 1962 (age 64) Augusta, Georgia, U.S.
- Party: Republican
- Spouse(s): Cindy DeAngelis Grossman (m. 1983; div. 2002) Julie Blanchard (m. 2021)
- Children: 4, including Christian
- Education: University of Georgia (BS)
- Awards: Full list
- Football career

No. 34
- Position: Running back

Personal information
- Listed height: 6 ft 1 in (1.85 m)
- Listed weight: 225 lb (102 kg)

Career information
- High school: Johnson County (Wrightsville, Georgia)
- College: Georgia (1980–1982)
- NFL draft: 1985: 5th round, 114th overall pick

Career history
- New Jersey Generals (1983–1985); Dallas Cowboys (1986–1989); Minnesota Vikings (1989–1991); Philadelphia Eagles (1992–1994); New York Giants (1995); Dallas Cowboys (1996–1997)

Awards and highlights
- USFL MVP (1985); 2× Second-team All-Pro (1987, 1988); 2× Pro Bowl (1987, 1988); National champion (1980); Heisman Trophy (1982); SEC Athlete of the Year (1983); 3× SEC Player of the Year (1980–1982); 3× Unanimous All-American (1980–1982); SEC All-Time Team (1982); First-team AP All-Time All-American (2025); Georgia Bulldogs No. 34 retired

Career NFL statistics
- Rushing attempts: 1,954
- Rushing yards: 8,225
- Rushing touchdowns: 61
- Receptions: 512
- Receiving yards: 4,859
- Receiving touchdowns: 21
- Stats at Pro Football Reference
- College Football Hall of Fame
- Martial arts career
- Height: 6 ft 1 in (185 cm)
- Weight: 220 lb (100 kg; 15 st 10 lb)
- Division: Heavyweight
- Reach: 76 in (193 cm)
- Stance: Orthodox
- Fighting out of: San Jose, California, U.S.
- Team: American Kickboxing Academy
- Trainer: Bob Cook
- Rank: 5th degree black belt in Taekwondo

Mixed martial arts record
- Total: 2
- Wins: 2
- By knockout: 2
- Losses: 0

Other information
- Mixed martial arts record from Sherdog

Herschel Junior Walker (born March 3, 1962) is an American diplomat and former professional football running back who has served as United States ambassador to the Bahamas since 2025. A member of the Republican Party, he previously played in the National Football League (NFL) for 12 seasons. He was also the Republican nominee in the 2022 U.S. Senate election in Georgia.

Walker played college football for the Georgia Bulldogs, winning the Heisman Trophy in 1982. He spent the first three seasons of his professional career from 1983 to 1985 with the New Jersey Generals of the United States Football League (USFL) and was MVP in his final year with the league. After the USFL folded, Walker joined the NFL with the Dallas Cowboys, earning consecutive Pro Bowl and second-team All-Pro honors from 1987 to 1988. In 1989, Walker was traded to the Minnesota Vikings, which is regarded as one of the most lopsided trades in NFL history and credited with establishing the Cowboys' dynasty of the 1990s. He was later a member of the Philadelphia Eagles and New York Giants before retiring with the Cowboys. Walker was inducted to the College Football Hall of Fame in 1999.

Outside of football, Walker was a member of the United States' bobsleigh team at the 1992 Winter Olympics and pursued business ventures in food processing. From 2019 to 2020, he served as a co-chair on the President's Council on Sports, Fitness, and Nutrition under President Donald Trump. Walker launched his first political campaign in Georgia's 2022 U.S. Senate election, losing to Democratic incumbent Raphael Warnock in a runoff. In 2025, Walker was confirmed by the Senate in a 51–47 vote as the United States ambassador to the Bahamas during Trump's second presidency.

== Early life and education ==
Walker was born in Augusta, Georgia, to Willis and Christine Walker. He was raised in Wrightsville, Georgia. He was one of seven children. Walker said that as a child, he was overweight and had a stutter.

Walker attended Johnson County High School in Wrightsville, where he played football, basketball, and competed in track. He played for the Johnson County Trojans high school football team from 1976 to 1979. In his senior year, he rushed for 3,167 yards to lead the Trojans to win their first state championship. He was awarded the inaugural Dial Award as 1979 national high school scholar-athlete of the year.

Walker also competed on the Trojans track and field team in events ranging from the 100-yard dash to the shot put. He won the shot put, 100-yard dash, and 220-yard dash events at the Georgia High School Association T&F State Championships. He also anchored the 4×400 team to victory.

Walker played running back and ran on the track and field team for the University of Georgia, where he was a three-time unanimous All-American (football and track), and winner of the 1982 Heisman Trophy and Maxwell Award. He is the first NCAA player who played only three years to finish in the top 10 in rushing yards, a mark later tied by Jonathan Taylor. During his freshman season in 1980, Walker set the NCAA freshman rushing record which was later broken by Taylor. Walker finished third in Heisman voting. Walker was the first "true freshman" to become a first-team All-American. As a freshman, he played a major role in helping Georgia go undefeated and win the de facto national championship with a victory over Notre Dame in the Sugar Bowl. In 1999, Walker was elected to the College Football Hall of Fame.

In his 2008 autobiography, Walker wrote that he was the Beta Club president and class valedictorian at Johnson County High School. In December 2021, Walker's Senate campaign website claimed he graduated as the valedictorian of the entire high school, but CNN found no evidence for this claim. The claim on Walker's website was later removed and amended to state that Walker graduated high school "top of his class".

Starting in 2017, Walker has made the false claim that he had graduated from University of Georgia "in the top 1% of his class". In fact, he did not graduate, and left college to join the USFL. He had yet to return to complete his degree. In December 2021, Walker's Senate campaign website deleted the assertions about his education after The Atlanta Journal-Constitution inquired about it, with Walker acknowledging in a statement that he left the university prior to graduation to play professional football. Walker later falsely asserted he never said he graduated from the university. 42 years after his initial enrollment, he returned to the institution and graduated with a Bachelor of Science in Family and Consumer Sciences degree in Housing Management and Policy on December 16, 2024.

== Professional football career ==
=== United States Football League ===
Walker signed with the New Jersey Generals in 1983, owned by Oklahoma oil tycoon J. Walter Duncan, who after the 1983 season sold the team to Donald Trump. Walker attracted only one major promotional offer, a joint project of McDonald's and Adidas.

In the 1983 USFL season, he led the league in rushing yards with 1,812 on 412 carries for 17 touchdowns. He had 1,000-yard rushing seasons in all three years of the USFL as the highlight of the Generals as a franchise (who never won a playoff game in their existence). In the final season of 1985, he ran for 2,411 yards with 21 touchdowns to lead the league in rushing. In three USFL seasons, he ran for a total of 5,562 rushing yards and 1,484 receiving yards.

=== National Football League ===
==== Dallas Cowboys (first stint) ====
The Dallas Cowboys, aware of Walker's earlier interest in playing for them, acquired Walker's NFL rights by selecting him in the fifth round (114th overall) of the 1985 NFL draft.

In 1986, he was signed by the Cowboys and moved to fullback, so he could share backfield duties with Tony Dorsett, becoming the second Heisman backfield tandem in NFL history, after George Rogers and Earl Campbell teamed with the 1984 New Orleans Saints. This move created tension, as it would limit Dorsett's playing time, and because Walker's $5 million five-year contract exceeded his $4.5 million five-year contract. Walker rushed for the game-winning touchdown with a minute to play in the 31–28 victory against the New York Giants in the season opener. In the week 15 game against the Philadelphia Eagles, he had a franchise-record 292 yards of total offense, including the NFL's longest run of the year with an 84-yarder for a touchdown and an 84-yard touchdown reception.

In 1987, Walker complained to Cowboys management about being moved around between three different positions (running back, fullback, wide receiver) and that Dorsett had more carries. He would be the team's main running back, playing in 12 games (11 starts), while registering 891 rushing yards, 715 receiving yards, and 8 touchdowns. Dorsett played in 12 games (6 starts) and had two healthy DNP (Did Not Play), which would make him demand a trade that would send him to the Denver Broncos.

Walker established himself as an NFL running back in 1988, becoming a one-man offense, reaching his NFL career highs of 1,514 rushing yards and 505 receiving yards, while playing seven positions: halfback, fullback, tight end, H-back, wide receiver, both in the slot and as a flanker. He became the 10th player in NFL history to amass more than 2,000 combined rushing and receiving yards in a season. In the process he achieved two consecutive Pro Bowls (1987 and 1988).

In 1989, the Cowboys traded Walker to the Minnesota Vikings for a total of five players (linebacker Jesse Solomon, defensive back Issiac Holt, running back Darrin Nelson, linebacker David Howard, defensive end Alex Stewart) and six future draft picks. The five players were tied to potential draft picks Minnesota would give Dallas if a player was cut (which led to Emmitt Smith, Russell Maryland, Kevin Smith, and Darren Woodson).

==== Minnesota Vikings ====
Walker's trade to Minnesota was initially considered by many as supplying the Vikings with the "missing piece" for a Super Bowl run; however, over time, as the Cowboys' fortunes soared and the Vikings' waned, it became viewed as, perhaps, the most lopsided trade in NFL history. From the moment he arrived in Minneapolis, "Herschel Mania" erupted. After a 2½ hour practice where he studied 12 offensive plays, Walker debuted against the Green Bay Packers.

He received three standing ovations from the record Metrodome crowd of 62,075, producing a Vikings win after four successive losses and 14 of the prior 18 games with the Packers. In 42 total games with the Vikings, he ultimately ran for 2,264 yards with 20 touchdowns while catching 86 passes. Scout.com says, "Walker was never used properly by the coaching brain trust." In Walker's total tenure with the Vikings, he reached the playoffs just one time with them, doing so in the 1989 season. Facing the San Francisco 49ers in the Divisional Round, he carried the ball nine times for 29 yards while catching two passes for 14 yards and taking five kicks for 97 yards as the 49ers walloped the Vikings 41–13.

"Herschel the Turkey", a mock honor given out by the Star Tribune newspaper to inept Minnesota sports personalities, is named for him.

==== Philadelphia Eagles ====
After three seasons in Minnesota, the Philadelphia Eagles signed Walker in 1992 hoping he would help them reach the Super Bowl. That year, he rushed 267 times for 1,070 rushing yards and eight rushing touchdowns to go along with 38 receptions for 278 receiving yards and two receiving touchdowns as the Eagles advanced to the Divisional Round before being eliminated.

In the 1993 season, Walker rushed 174 times for 746 rushing yards and one rushing touchdown. He was a significant part of the receiving game for the 8–8 Eagles with 75 receptions for 610 receiving yards and three receiving touchdowns.

In 1994 he became the first NFL player to have one-play gains of 90 or more yards rushing, receiving and kick-returning in a single season. He spent three seasons in Philadelphia, leaving after the Eagles signed free agent Ricky Watters.

==== New York Giants ====
The New York Giants signed Walker in 1995 to a three-year contract worth $4.8 million as a third-down back. Walker led the Giants with 45 kick returns at 21.5 yards per return in 1995, his only season with the team.

==== Dallas Cowboys (second stint) ====
In 1996, he rejoined the Dallas Cowboys as a kickoff return specialist and third-down back. He also played fullback, but primarily as a ball-handler instead of a blocker out of I-Form and pro-sets. Walker retired at the end of the 1997 season.

== Career statistics ==
=== NFL ===
Year	Team	GP	Rushing					Receiving					Kick returns				
Year	Team	GP	Att	Yds	Avg	Lng	TD	Rec	Yds	Avg	Lng	TD	Ret	Yds	Avg	Lng	TD
1986	DAL	16	151	737	4.9	84	12	76	837	11.0	84	2	0	0	0.0	0	0
1987	DAL	12	209	891	4.3	60	7	60	715	11.9	44	1	0	0	0.0	0	0
1988	DAL	16	361	1,514	4.2	38	5	53	505	9.5	50	2	0	0	0.0	0	0
1989	DAL	5	81	246	3.0	20	2	22	261	11.9	52	1	0	0	0.0	0	0
1989	MIN	11	169	669	4.0	47	5	18	162	9.0	24	2	13	374	28.8	93	1
1990	MIN	16	184	770	4.2	58	5	35	315	9.0	52	4	44	966	22.0	64	0
1991	MIN	15	198	825	4.2	71	10	33	204	6.1	32	0	5	83	16.6	21	0
1992	PHI	16	267	1,070	4.0	38	8	38	278	7.3	19	2	3	69	23.0	34	0
1993	PHI	16	174	746	4.3	35	1	75	610	8.1	41	3	11	184	16.7	30	0
1994	PHI	16	113	528	4.7	91	5	50	500	10.0	93	2	21	581	27.7	94	1
1995	NYG	16	31	126	4.1	36	0	31	234	7.5	55	1	41	881	21.5	67	0
1996	DAL	16	10	83	8.3	39	1	7	89	12.7	34	0	27	779	28.9	67	0
1997	DAL	16	6	20	3.3	11	0	14	149	10.6	64	2	50	1,167	23.3	49	0
Career		187	1,954	8,225	4.2	91	61	512	4,859	9.5	93	21	215	5,084	23.6	94	2

=== USFL ===
New Jersey Generals
Year	Rushing					Receiving					Kick returns					2Pt
Year	Att	Yds	Avg	Lng	TD	Rec	Yds	Avg	Lng	TD	Ret	Yds	Avg	Lng	TD	2Pt
1983	412	1,812	4.4	80	17	53	489	9.2	65	1	3	69	23.0	27	0	1
1984	293	1,339	4.6	69	16	40	528	13.2	50	5	0	0	0.0	0	0	1
1985	438	2,411	5.5	88	21	37	467	12.6	68	1	0	0	0.0	0	0	0
Career	1,143	5,562	4.9	88	54	130	1,484	11.4	68	7	3	69	23.0	27	0	2

=== College ===
Season	Team	Rushing					Receiving		
Season	Team	Att	Yds	Avg	Lng	TD	Rec	Yds	TD
1980	Georgia	274	1,616	5.9	76	15	7	70	1
1981	Georgia	385	1,891	4.9	32	18	14	84	2
1982	Georgia	335	1,752	5.2	59	16	5	89	1
Career		994	5,259	5.3	76	49	26	243	4

== Awards and honors ==
NFL

- 2× Second-team All-Pro (1987, 1988)
- 2× Pro Bowl (1987, 1988)

USFL

- USFL MVP (1985)

NCAA

- National champion (1980)
- Heisman Trophy (1982)
- Maxwell Award (1982)
- Walter Camp Award (1982)
- SN Player of the Year (1982)
- UPI Player of the Year (1982)
- Chic Harley Award (1982)
- SEC Athlete of the Year (1983)
- 3× SEC Player of the Year (1980–1982)
- 3× Unanimous All-American (1980–1982)
- 3× First-team All-SEC (1980–1982)
- SEC All-Time Team (1982)
- First-team AP All-Time All-American (2025)
- Georgia Bulldogs No. 34 retired
- American Academy of Achievement Golden Plate Award

Halls of Fame

- College Football Hall of Fame — Class of 1999
- National High School Hall of Fame — Class of 2003
- International Sports Hall of Fame — Class of 2017

State/local

- On July 4, 2017, during Wrightsville's annual Fourth of July celebration and parade, Trojan Way, the street where Johnson County High School resides, was officially renamed Herschel Walker Drive.

== Other athletic and competitive activities ==
He won the 1987 and 1988 Superstars competitions.

In 1992, Walker competed in the Winter Olympics in Albertville, France as a member of the United States' bobsleigh team. Originally selected for the four-man team, he eventually competed as the brakeman (or pusher) in the two-man competition. Walker and his teammate Brian Shimer placed seventh.

In November 2007, Walker appeared on the HDNet show Inside MMA as a guest. He indicated he would take part in a mixed martial arts reality show in the near future (along with José Canseco) and that he would have an official MMA fight at the conclusion of the show. In September 2009, it was announced that Walker had been signed by MMA promotion company Strikeforce to compete in their heavyweight division at the age of 47.

He began a 12-week training camp with trainer "Crazy" Bob Cook at the American Kickboxing Academy in October 2009 in San Jose, California. In his MMA debut on January 30, 2010, Walker defeated Greg Nagy via technical knock-out due to strikes at Strikeforce: Miami.

In 2009, Walker was a contestant in the second season of the reality television show The Celebrity Apprentice.

Strikeforce confirmed that Walker would face former WEC fighter Scott Carson when he made his second appearance in the Strikeforce cage. Walker was forced off the Strikeforce card on December 4 due to a cut suffered in training that required seven stitches. They fought instead on January 29, 2011, and Walker defeated Carson via TKO (strikes) at 3:13 of round 1.

In 2014, Walker won season 3 of Rachael vs. Guy: Celebrity Cook-Off.

Walker has a fifth-degree black belt in taekwondo.

=== Mixed martial arts record ===
Professional record breakdown
2 matches	2 wins	0 losses
By knockout	2	0

Res.	Record	Opponent	Method	Event	Date	Round	Time	Location	Notes
Win	2–0	Scott Carson	TKO (strikes)	Strikeforce: Diaz vs. Cyborg	January 29, 2011	1	3:13	San Jose, California United States	
Win	1–0	Greg Nagy	TKO (punches)	Strikeforce: Miami	January 30, 2010	3	2:17	Sunrise, Florida, United States	Heavyweight debut.

== Business activities ==
In 1984, Walker franchised a D'Lites fast food restaurant in Athens, Georgia.

In 2002, Walker created Renaissance Man Food Services, which distributes chicken products. Originally, his producer was Sysco Corp. following a casual conversation with a Sysco vice president who asked him to provide some chicken-breading recipes from his mother. He founded Savannah-based H. Walker Enterprises in 2002 as an umbrella company for most of his other business ventures, the largest of which was Renaissance Man Food Services.

Walker has a history of exaggerating the number of people employed by and the assets of his companies; the failure of several business enterprises led to creditors bringing lawsuits. Walker touted Renaissance Man Food Services as one of the largest minority-owned meat processors in the nation, with $70 million in annual sales. In subsequent deposition testimony in a lawsuit, however, Walker gave far lower figures, saying that his company averaged about $1.5 million in annual profits from 2008 and 2017.

Walker has touted Renaissance Man Food Services as a "mini-Tyson Foods", and also said that the company controlled multiple chicken processing plants. However, in a 2018 declaration submitted in a legal case against his company, Walker acknowledged that the company did not actually own any chicken processing plants and instead partnered with plant owners to sell branded chicken products. Walker's business associates later testified that Walker licensed his name to the chicken-related enterprise.

In 2009, Walker told the media that Renaissance Man Food Services had over 100 employees. In 2018, Walker told the media that Renaissance Man Food Services had "over 600 employees." In 2020, Renaissance Man Food Services informed the U.S. government that it had eight employees. The Atlanta Journal-Constitution suggested that Walker's overestimate of employees could "refer to chicken processing jobs, which are not actually part of Walker's business".

In April 2020, Renaissance Man Food Services applied for a Paycheck Protection Program (PPP) loan due to the economic impact of the COVID-19 pandemic, and the company ultimately received two PPP loans totaling $180,000 (of which $111,300 was forgiven). On Twitter in April 2020, Walker mocked "big companies" that received PPP money, suggesting that they were "giving back" the money due to being "ashamed". This was despite Walker being a board member of the Sotherly Hotel Group, owner of the Georgian Terrace Hotel and other hotels; the group received over $9 million of PPP loans in April 2020 while firing 90% of its hotel staff, according to company documents submitted to the U.S. government. According to government records, Walker was paid $247,227 in total from Sotherly from 2016 to 2021.

Walker said that "part of its corporate charter" was to donate 15% of profits to charities. However, none of the four charities that Walker named as beneficiaries confirmed they actually received any donations.

== Political career ==
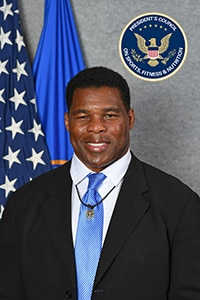
Walker's official portrait as a co-chair of the President's Council on Sports, Fitness and Nutrition

In 2014, Walker appeared in a commercial paid for by the United States Chamber of Commerce supporting Jack Kingston's bid in the Republican primary election for the 2014 U.S. Senate election in Georgia. In 2018, Walker endorsed Republican Brian Kemp in the 2018 Georgia gubernatorial election. In 2020, Walker endorsed U.S. Senator Kelly Loeffler. Walker supported Donald Trump in the 2016 and 2020 presidential elections, and spoke on Trump's behalf at the 2020 Republican National Convention.

=== Co-Chair of the President's Council on Physical Fitness and Sports ===
In 2018, President Trump appointed Walker to the President's Council on Sports, Fitness, and Nutrition. Trump reappointed him to another two year-term in December 2020. He was removed from the position in March 2022 by President Biden after he was asked to resign.

=== 2022 U.S. Senate election in Georgia ===
In 2021, then-former President Donald Trump encouraged Walker to run for the U.S. Senate in Georgia. Walker, a Texas resident, needed to re-establish residency in Georgia to do so. Walker's contemplation of entering the race "froze" the Republican field because other prospective candidates for the nomination waited for his decision. In July 2021, Fox News reported that some Georgia Republicans were not sure how effective a candidate Walker would be, citing the fact that his positions on issues of importance to Republican voters were unknown.

In August 2021, Walker announced his run for the Senate seat held by Democrat Raphael Warnock. Walker began his campaign with high favorability ratings and support from self-identified moderate Republicans, and, in October 2021, was endorsed by Senate Minority Leader Mitch McConnell, in a sign that the Republican establishment was lining up behind him.

In June 2022, The Atlanta Journal-Constitution found Walker's claims about working in law enforcement were either false or unverifiable. Walker has been named as an honorary deputy sheriff in Cobb County and Johnson County. In 2019, Walker said he "spent time at Quantico at the FBI training school" and was "an agent" when, in reality, Walker lacked the bachelor's degree required for FBI training. Previously, in 1989, Walker told the media that he "had fun" while attending an FBI school in Quantico for a week, speaking of an "obstacle course and you shoot at targets".

Many of Walker's statements on the campaign trail have been described as "gaffes" or "head-scratching at best". In an editorial for CNN, Chris Cillizza described Walker as a "walking gaffe machine", and disputed several statements Walker had made.

On October 5, 2022, Walker's campaign fired Taylor Crowe, his campaign political director, over suspicions that he leaked information to the media.

On October 14, 2022, Walker and his Democratic challenger, Raphael Warnock, faced off in their only debate for the Senate election. The New York Times described Walker's demeanor throughout the debate as "aggressive and persistent," with his frequent interruptions of Warnock and mocking of him for dodging questions. Walker repeatedly tried to link Warnock with President Joe Biden, who carried a low approval rating. During a portion of the debate focusing on crime, Walker revealed what appeared to be a law enforcement badge (Note: According to a spokesperson from Walker's campaign, the badge was an honorary badge from the Cobb County Sheriff Department that Walker received for community service. However, The New York Times also notes the badge Walker presented on the debate stage was not an authentic badge that trained sheriffs carry, but was rather "an honorary badge often given to celebrities in sports or entertainment.") to illustrate his closeness to law enforcement; he was admonished by the moderators since props were not allowed during the debate. The Hill wrote Walker won a "moral victory by avoiding disaster" and "more than avoided embarrassment."

Since no candidate received a majority of the vote in the general election on November 8, 2022, he faced incumbent Democrat Raphael Warnock in a runoff election on December 6, 2022, and narrowly lost. The final tally of votes was 51.40% for Warnock and 48.60% for Walker. Walker conceded the election that night, stating: "I'm not going to make any excuses now because we put up one heck of a fight. [...] I want you to continue to believe in this country, believe in our elected officials, and most of all, stay together".

=== U.S. ambassador to the Bahamas ===
On December 17, 2024, Walker was named by President-elect Donald Trump as his presumptive nominee for the position of U.S. Ambassador to the Bahamas. On March 25, 2025, his nomination was referred to the U.S. Senate Committee on Foreign Relations. In June 2025, Walker disclosed his financial assets, while also pledging to resign from leadership positions at his businesses and divest individual stock holdings if confirmed. He appeared before the United States Senate Committee on Foreign Relations in September 2025, answering questions about drug trafficking and Chinese influence in the Caribbean.

On October 7, 2025, Walker’s nomination was confirmed by the Senate in a 51–47 vote. He was the first ambassador confirmed to the position since 2011. He presented his credentials to Governor-General of the Bahamas Cynthia A. Pratt on December 9, 2025.

== Political positions ==
=== 2020 presidential election ===
After Joe Biden won the 2020 presidential election, Walker tweeted a video supporting Trump's efforts to overturn the election results. Walker has spread many conspiracy theories about the 2020 presidential election. Walker claimed that Biden "didn't get 50 million" votes; Biden indeed received over 80 million votes. Walker alleged that there was "country-wide election fraud" and urged Trump and "true patriots" to carry out "a total cleansing" to "prosecute all the bad actors". He urged re-votes in the states of Arizona, Georgia, Michigan, Nevada, North Carolina, Pennsylvania and Wisconsin. Walker also spread a conspiracy theory about the 2021 United States Capitol attack, suggesting it was a "well-planned" distraction from election fraud.

In July 2022, when asked whether Joe Biden had fairly defeated Donald Trump in Georgia, Walker replied, "I have no clue." In the October debate with Warnock, when asked if Joe Biden was the winner of the 2020 election, Walker stated, "President Biden won and Raphael Warnock won."

=== Abortion ===
In May 2022, Walker stated he opposes abortion, and wants no exceptions to abortion bans. He also called for more money to promote adoption and to support single parents. "You never know what a child is going to become. And I've seen some people, they've had some tough times, but I always said, 'No matter what, tough times make tough people.'" When asked about the impact of the issue on the November 2022 election, Walker described abortion rights as among the "things that people are not concerned about". In September 2022, Walker endorsed legislation proposed by Senator Lindsey Graham that would ban abortion after 15 weeks of pregnancy nationwide, except in cases of rape, incest, and threat to the life of the patient. During his October debate with Raphael Warnock, Walker softened his position on abortion, saying he supported the Georgia law allowing exceptions for rape and threats to the mother's life and health.

On October 3, 2022, The Daily Beast published allegations from a woman who said that Walker impregnated her and paid for her abortion in 2009 when they were dating. The woman supported the allegation by producing images of a personal check from Walker, a get-well card with Walker's purported signature, and a $575 receipt for an abortion. The Daily Beast said that it corroborated the story with a friend of the woman, who "took care of her in the days after the procedure". Walker stated, "I never asked anyone to get an abortion. I never paid for an abortion." When asked about the check, Walker said, "I give money to people all the time, because I'm always helping people". Walker said he would sue The Daily Beast for defamation. After Walker said on October 5 that he did not know the identity of the woman accusing him, The Daily Beast reported that the woman is the mother of one of Walker's children; she told The Daily Beast that she had another child with Walker years after the abortion, despite Walker stating that it was not a convenient time for him to have a child, a sentiment he also raised prior to the abortion.

Within a week of the original allegations' publication, The New York Times interviewed the same woman, as well as her friend, corroborating the reporting by The Daily Beast. The woman additionally told The New York Times that she ended her relationship with Walker when he advised her to have a second abortion in 2011. Family court records in New York confirm that Walker and the woman had a son, who was born in 2012. On October 7, 2022, Walker acknowledged that his accuser was the mother of his son, and as to whether she had an abortion, Walker said: "I'm not saying she did or didn't have one [an abortion]. I'm saying I don't know anything about that." He acknowledged the possibility of having given his accuser a 'get well' card and a check for other reasons, but said he could not remember doing so.

In an October 26, 2022, press conference organized by attorney Gloria Allred, a second woman, who has not identified herself, alleged she had been pressured by Walker to get an abortion in 1993 after a years-long extramarital relationship with him. Walker denied the allegation, saying it was a "lie". On November 22, Allred held another press conference, where the second woman also spoke, and audio recordings of Walker were shared. The woman read out letters that she said Walker wrote, including one to her which stated: "I'm sorry I have put you through all this stuff." Allred read out a signed declaration of a friend of the second woman, which stated that the second woman originally said that she had a miscarriage, but the friend suspected that it was an abortion because the friend knew that Walker was married at the time and did not want to have a child with the second woman; years later, the second woman told the friend that Walker actually sent her to a clinic for an abortion.

=== Economy ===
Walker favors reducing federal regulations to boost business. He supports widespread tax cuts, building the Keystone Pipeline and increasing production of fossil fuels. He proposes to "lower healthcare costs by increasing competitive market options". Walker supports putting closed oil fields back into production and rolling back oil-field regulations in order to reduce inflation.

=== Environment and climate change ===
When asked about the Green New Deal environmental program, Walker said that he opposed it because "Since we don't control the air our good air decided to float over to China's bad air so when China gets our good air, their bad air got to move. So it moves over to our good air space. Then now we got we to clean that back up." In August 2022, in response to questions about the passage of the Inflation Reduction Act of 2022, which includes funding to counteract climate change, Walker said, "They continue to try to fool you that they are helping you out. But they're not". Possibly referring to a provision that allocated $1.5 billion to the U.S. Forest Service's Urban and Community Forestry Program, Walker added, "Because a lot of money, it's going to trees. Don't we have enough trees around here?" Walker told supporters at a November 2022 rally that America isn't "ready for the green agenda. ... What we need to do is keep having those gas-guzzling cars. We got the good emissions under those cars".

=== Guns ===
When asked in May 2022 on how to tackle gun violence, Walker said: "Cain killed Abel and that's a problem that we have. What we need to do is look into how we can stop those things." Walker then suggested "getting a department that can look at young men that's looking at women, that's looking at their social media", and also by "putting money into the mental health field ... rather than departments that want to take away your rights." When asked if he supported new gun laws in the wake of the Uvalde school shooting, Walker responded: "What I like to do is see it and everything and stuff."

=== LGBT rights ===
Walker opposes allowing trans women in women's sports competitions, stating in September 2022: "Let's get men out of women's sports". Walker also discussed transgender children in general, stating, "they're telling the young kids in school, you can be a boy tomorrow even if you're a girl... But I want the young kids to know you go to heaven. Jesus may not recognize you. Because he made you a boy. He made you a girl."

Asked about same-sex marriage, Walker said states should be free to decide the legality of same-sex marriage.

=== National security ===
Walker supports a wall at the border with Mexico. He wants the United States to "heavily invest" in the military.

== Electoral history ==
2022 U.S. Senate election in Georgia, Republican primary
Party	Candidate	Votes	%
Republican	Herschel Walker	803,560	68.18%
Republican	Gary Black	157,370	13.35%
Republican	Latham Saddler	104,471	8.86%
Republican	Josh Clark	46,693	3.96%
Republican	Kelvin King	37,930	3.22%
Republican	Jonathan McColumn	28,601	2.43%
Total votes		1,178,625	100.0%

2022 U.S. Senate election in Georgia
Party	Candidate	Votes	%	±%
Democratic	Raphael Warnock (incumbent)	1,946,117	49.44%	+1.05%
Republican	Herschel Walker	1,908,442	48.49%	−0.88%
Libertarian	Chase Oliver	81,365	2.07%	+1.35%
Total votes		3,935,924	100.0%	

2022 U.S. Senate runoff election in Georgia
Party	Candidate	Votes	%	±%
Democratic	Raphael Warnock (incumbent)	1,820,633	51.40%	+0.36%
Republican	Herschel Walker	1,721,244	48.60%	−0.36%
Total votes		3,541,877	100.0%	
Democratic hold				

== Personal life ==
Walker has lived in Westlake, Texas, and in the Las Colinas area of Irving, Texas. As of June 2025, Walker's net worth is between $32.1 million and $80.5 million according to his financial assets disclosure.

In August 2021, as he was preparing to run for U.S. Senate, Walker registered to vote in Georgia and listed his residence as Buckhead, Georgia; the property is owned by his wife Julie Blanchard. However, in a January 2022 political campaign event, Walker said: "I live in Texas … I was sitting in my home in Texas …" Tax records also show that Walker's primary residence for 2021 and 2022 is still registered as Tarrant County, Texas, where he continues to receive property tax breaks.

=== Relationships and children ===
Walker married Cindy DeAngelis Grossman, whom he met in college, in 1983. They have a son, Christian, a social media influencer After 19 years of marriage, Walker and Grossman divorced in 2002. Julie Blanchard in 2012 said that she was Walker's fiancée; Walker married Blanchard in 2021.

Walker has two additional sons and a daughter whom he did not publicly acknowledge before his 2022 US Senate campaign; he did so in June 2022, one day after The Daily Beast reported on one of his additional sons. Walker said that month, during a conference, that he "never denied" having four children. The Daily Beast later reported that Walker had lied to his 2022 Senate campaign about how many children he had, while The Atlanta Journal-Constitution reported "allies to Walker" stating that Walker had not been honest about how many children he had. Walker said that he did not publicly acknowledge his children to prevent exposing them to unwanted attention, and criticized the claim that "I hide my children because I don't discuss them with reporters to win a campaign". Earlier during his Senate campaigning, Walker repeatedly discussed his relationship with eldest son Christian.

Prior to publicly acknowledging his other children, in a 2020 interview, Walker said that fatherless households were a "major, major problem" in African-American communities. In October 2022, Walker's adult son Christian criticized Walker, stating, "my favorite issue to talk about is father absence. Surprise! Because it affected me. ... He has four kids, four different women. Wasn't in the house raising one of them. He was out having sex with other women." Also in October 2022, the mother of another of Walker's sons (born in 2012), said that Walker had seen his son "maybe ... three times", with Walker's parenting contributions mostly being court-ordered child support and sporadic gifts, while suggesting that the gifts were actually from Walker's fiancée/wife Julie Blanchard, and not from him.

=== Domestic violence allegations ===
In September 2001, when Walker and Grossman were estranged, an Irving, Texas, police report stated that police were called to Grossman's home by Walker's therapist due to Walker's visit there; Walker was "volatile", had a weapon, and was scaring Grossman. The report stated that Walker "talked about having a shoot-out with police"; the therapist, Jerry Mungadze, defused the situation after speaking to Walker for at least half an hour. The report stated that police confiscated a SIG Sauer handgun from Walker's car, put his home on a "caution list" due to Walker's "violent tendencies", but did not arrest or charge Walker. In a separate incident, Mungadze told the media that when he conducted a therapy session with Walker and Grossman, he called 911 because Walker "threatened to kill" all three of them, prompting the police to arrive; the result of the incident was Walker hitting a door, breaking his fist.

In filing for divorce in December 2001, Grossman accused him of "physically abusive and extremely threatening behavior." After the divorce, she told the media that, during their marriage, Walker pointed a pistol at her head and said: "I'm going to blow your f'ing brains out." She also said he had used knives to threaten her. In 2005, a restraining order was imposed on Walker regarding Grossman, after Grossman's sister stated in an affidavit that Walker told her "unequivocally that he was going to shoot my sister Cindy and her [new] boyfriend in the head." As a result, a temporary gun-owning ban was also issued to Walker by a judge. Walker stated that he does not remember the assault or the threats and attributed his aberrant behavior with his wife and others to his dissociative identity disorder for which he was diagnosed in 2001.

In January 2012, a woman, Myka Dean, made a report to Irving, Texas, police that when she attempted to end a 20-year "on-off" relationship with Walker, he "lost it" and threatened to wait at her home to "blow her head off". The responding police officer described this as "extreme threats". Federal records show that Dean, as well as her mother and stepfather, were business partners of Walker's, for his company Renaissance Man Inc. Dean died in 2019; Walker's 2022 political campaign stated that the allegations in the 2012 police report were false, and that Walker still had a good relationship with Dean's parents.

In October 2022, Walker's adult son Christian publicly accused Walker of having threatened to kill him and his mother. He addressed Walker on Twitter, stating: "You're not a 'family man' when you left us to bang a bunch of women, threatened to kill us, and had us move over 6 times in 6 months running from your violence ... how DARE YOU LIE and act as though you're some 'moral, Christian, upright man' ... You've lived a life of DESTROYING other peoples lives." Soon after Christian made the allegations, Walker wrote on Twitter that he loved his son "no matter what".

In December 2022, The Daily Beast reported that Cheryl Parsa, an ex-girlfriend of Walker who lives in Dallas, had alleged that in 2005, during their relationship, she found Walker with another woman. According to Parsa, Walker got angry, put his hands on Parsa's neck and chest, and swung a fist at her.

=== Mental health ===
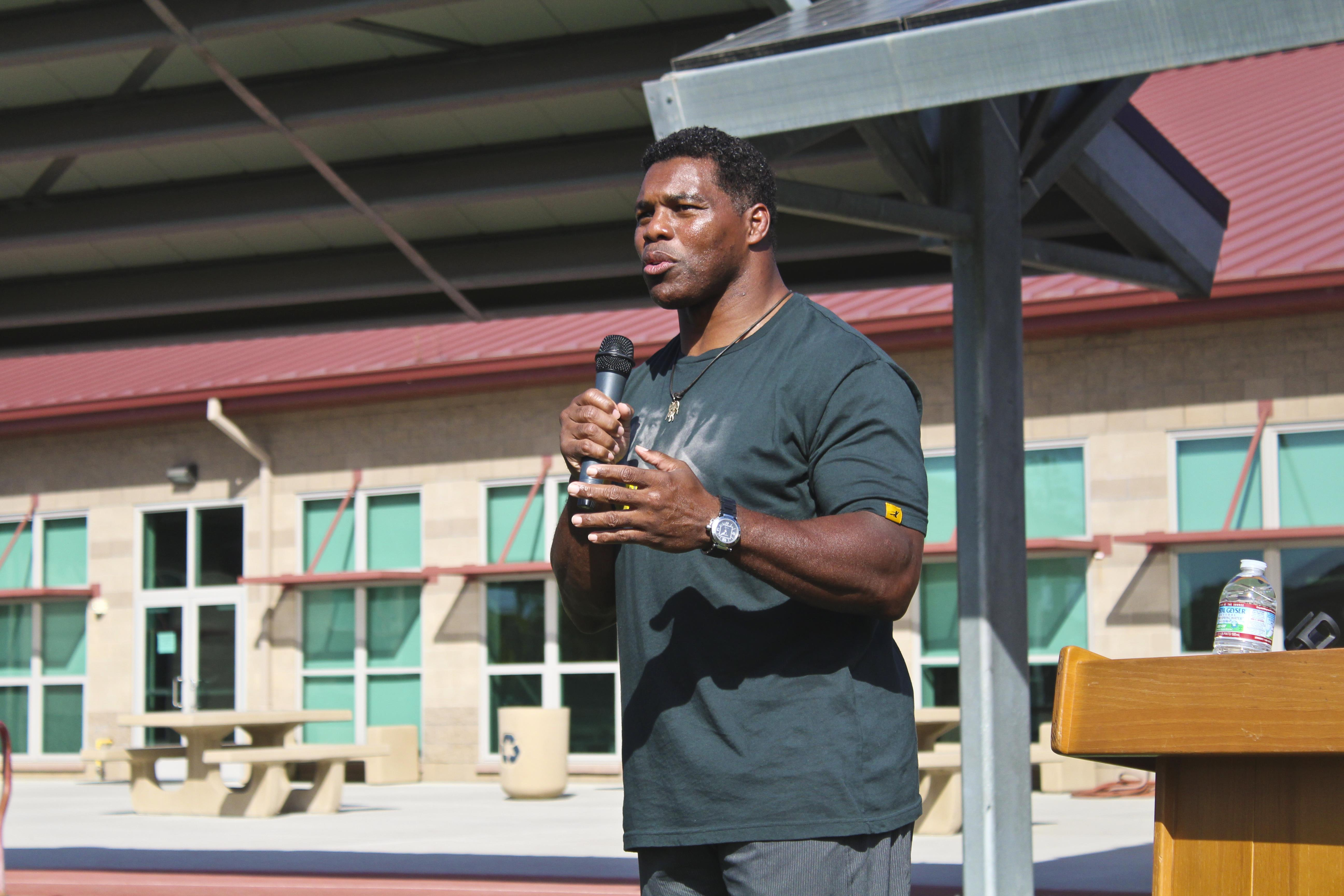
Walker giving a speech on mental health, 2017

Walker has spoken publicly about being diagnosed with dissociative identity disorder and has served as spokesperson for a mental health treatment program for veterans. Walker says he wrote the 2008 book Breaking Free: My Life with Dissociative Identity Disorder to help dispel myths about mental illness and to help others. DID is among the most controversial of the dissociative disorders and among the most controversial disorders found in the DSM-5-TR, with many psychiatrists expressing doubts of its validity.

In the book, Walker wrote that he had a dozen distinct identities, or alters. According to Walker, some of his alters did many good things, but other alters exhibited extreme and violent behavior, which Walker said he mostly could not remember. A competitive alter caused him to play Russian roulette in 1991, as he saw "mortality as the ultimate challenge", he wrote. He was formally diagnosed with the disorder in 2001, after he sought professional help for being tempted to murder a man who was late in delivering a car to him.

Walker attributed his divorce to his behavior caused by the disorder. According to Walker's ex-wife, for the first 16 years of their marriage, Walker's alters were somehow controlled, and she had no idea that he had any disorder. Grossman said that the situation greatly deteriorated once Walker was diagnosed, after which he began to exhibit either "very sweet" alters or "very violent" alters who looked "evil". She said that in one situation where Walker exhibited two alters, she was in bed when he held a straight razor to her throat and repeatedly stated that he would kill her. Walker did not deny Grossman's account, saying that he did not remember it, because blackouts were a symptom of the disorder.

While receiving treatment for dissociative identity disorder in May 2002, Walker was the subject of an Irving, Texas, police report made by a friend of Grossman, Walker's ex-wife. She said that he followed her home and that she was "very frightened" of Walker, but did not want police to make contact with him as it would "only make the problem worse." She reported previously having a "confrontation" with Walker sometime around 2001, which was followed by Walker calling her to threaten her and "having her house watched".

== See also ==
- Black conservatism in the United States
- List of American sportsperson-politicians
- List of multi-sport athletes
- List of Strikeforce alumni

== Notes ==
Party political offices
Preceded by Kelly Loeffler	Republican nominee for U.S. Senator from Georgia (Class 3); 2022	Most recent
Diplomatic posts
Preceded by Kimberly Furnish; Acting	United States Ambassador to The Bahamas; 2025–present	Incumbent
