= Morey letter =

1880 American political forgery

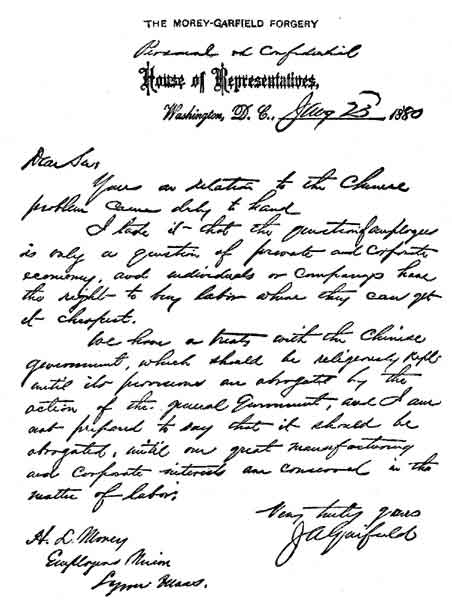
The Morey Letter

The Morey letter was a forged letter that appeared during the 1880 United States presidential election. It was purportedly from James A. Garfield, the Republican presidential candidate, and suggested that Garfield was in favor of Chinese immigration at a time when many white Americans were strongly opposed.

== Scandal ==
The letter was written on House of Representative official stationery dated January 23, 1880 and addressed to H. L. Morey of the Employers Union in Lynn, Massachusetts. The letter stated, "individuals and companies have the right to buy labor where they can get it cheapest. We have a treaty with the Chinese government ... I am not prepared to say that it should be abrogated until our great manufacturing and corporate interests are conserved in the matter of labor."

On October 21, New York newspaper The Truth featured the letter with a quote from a reporter saying that a friend of Garfield's had confirmed that the handwriting was indeed Garfield's.

== Reaction ==
=== Democratic attacks ===
Democrats used this letter to their advantage and started to print and circulate the letter wherever they could. They were able to get over 500,000 copies out. They put the letter in store windows and sent it to areas with a great number of Chinese immigrants, to maximize controversy. The letter was an October surprise that the Democrats thought would flip the vote to their favor. They even called the letter "Garfield's death warrant".

=== Garfield's response ===
Garfield received a telegraph on October 20, 1880, about a letter the candidate had allegedly written regarding "the Chinese question", that is, the question of the railroad companies hiring and importing Chinese labor to complete projects. Later that same day, he received the text of the letter.

Garfield requested a photo reproduction of the letter, and once he laid eyes upon it, he denied that he wrote the letter. He stated that it was a "manifestly bungling attempt to copy [his] hand and signature".

During this time, Republicans also sent an investigator to Lynn, Massachusetts to try to find any trace of the letter. The investigator could not find H. L. Morey or the Employers Union. Shortly after, Garfield wrote and told the Republican National Committee to reproduce a letter of him denying that the letter was his.

Garfield's real letter did not get published by any newspaper for about a week, and was often printed side by side with the original Morey letter.

== Result ==
Democrats said that the delay was evidence of Garfield's guilt. Most voters eventually thought the letter was a forgery, and just another political trick to win votes. The Morey letter was thought to be a forgery emanating from Democratic Party operatives, and produced a backlash against the Democrats.

Garfield narrowly lost the state of California by 144 votes. His popular vote margin was the smallest in US history; however, he had a decisive victory in the electoral college.

While never proven, there was much public speculation at the time that Stanley Huntley, journalist at the Brooklyn Eagle and creator of the Spoopendyke humor stories, was the author of the Morey letter. Huntley himself had made fun of the question of who wrote the letter in one of his stories.
