= Ralph Willis letter =

Forged document circulated during the 1996 Australian federal election

The Ralph Willis letter was forged correspondence released by Australian Labor Party's Treasurer Ralph Willis in May 1996, in the last week of the 1996 Australian federal election.

It has been blamed for the crushing defeat of Labor Prime Minister Paul Keating and the ascendancy of the Liberals' John Howard. Labor stayed out of power federally until 2007.

== Incident ==
In the last week of campaigning, the news was dominated by the "Ralph Willis letter". Willis released two letters purporting to be secret correspondence between Liberal Opposition Leader John Howard and Liberal Premier of Victoria, Jeff Kennett. It dealt with the impact of the Coalition's funding plans for the states. Howard quickly denounced the letter as a forgery, and claims of Labor skullduggery dominated the close of the campaign, drowning out anything Prime Minister Paul Keating said.

Willis acted unilaterally in releasing the correspondence. He suggested that the letters revealed that the Coalition government led by John Howard would cut grants to the states. However, media examination quickly revealed the letter to be a forgery. Labor claimed the forged documents had been foisted on Willis by the Melbourne University Liberal Club students.

Keating's Labor government suffered a severe defeat.

== Aftermath ==
After the election, Willis chose to move to the backbench and announced his retirement from Parliament prior to the 1998 election.

According to legal gossip sheet Justinian in 2002, left wing writer Bob Ellis in Goodbye Jerusalem: night thoughts of a Labor outsider (1997) claimed that the Ralph Willis letter was the cause of Keating's defeat. An anonymous writer named "Theodora" wrote that Waterfront (2002) by Anne Davies and Helen Trinca had regaled Ellis's "rant".

In 2019, The Saturday Paper reported that the forgery was the work of university students. Nicola Gobbo, later to be known as Lawyer X, first came to public attention during the campaign. Gobbo, then a Young Labor member, publicly claimed that the forger was a then-Liberal staffer and later Senate president Scott Ryan, who had intended for the forgery to pass initial inspection then rebound on Labor. Gobbo backed up her story with a statutory declaration, but Ryan denied the claim.

== See also ==
- October surprise – Event that may influence a US election
- Zinoviev letter – Forged document by the Daily Mail
