= Ralph Willis =

Australian politician (born 1938)

The Honourable Ralph Willis AO
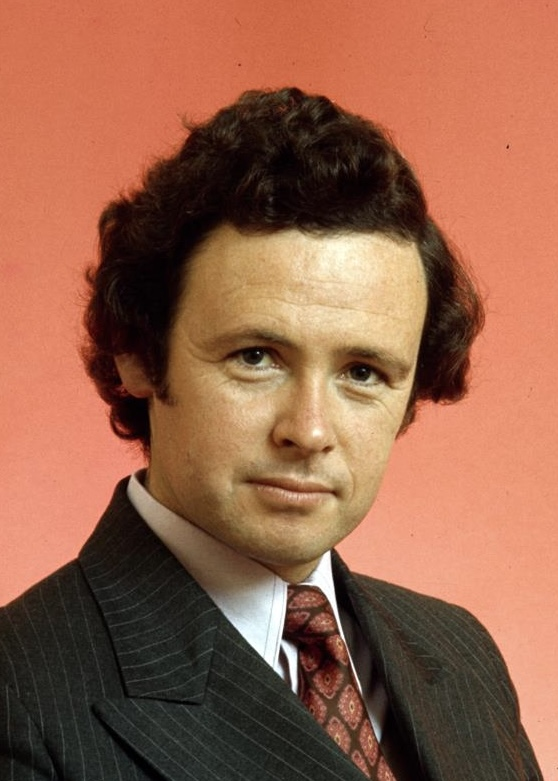
- Official portrait, 1974

Treasurer of Australia
- In office 23 December 1993 – 11 March 1996
- Prime Minister: Paul Keating
- Preceded by: John Dawkins
- Succeeded by: Peter Costello
- In office 9 December 1991 – 27 December 1991
- Prime Minister: Bob Hawke; Paul Keating
- Preceded by: John Kerin
- Succeeded by: John Dawkins

Minister for Finance
- In office 27 December 1991 – 23 December 1993
- Prime Minister: Paul Keating
- Preceded by: Kim Beazley
- Succeeded by: Kim Beazley
- In office 4 April 1990 – 9 December 1991
- Prime Minister: Bob Hawke
- Preceded by: Peter Walsh
- Succeeded by: Kim Beazley

Vice-President of the Executive Council
- In office 27 May 1992 – 24 March 1993
- Preceded by: Graham Richardson
- Succeeded by: Frank Walker

Minister for Transport and Communications
- In office 2 September 1988 – 4 April 1990
- Prime Minister: Bob Hawke
- Preceded by: Gareth Evans
- Succeeded by: Kim Beazley

Minister for Industrial Relations
- In office 11 March 1983 – 2 September 1988
- Prime Minister: Bob Hawke
- Preceded by: Ian Macphee
- Succeeded by: Peter Morris

Member of the Australian Parliament for Gellibrand
- In office 2 December 1972 – 31 August 1998
- Preceded by: Hector McIvor
- Succeeded by: Nicola Roxon

Personal details
- Born: 14 April 1938 (age 88) Melbourne, Victoria, Australia
- Party: Australian Labor Party
- Spouse: Carol Dawson
- Education: University of Melbourne
- Occupation: Unionist

Ralph Willis AO (born 14 April 1938) is an Australian former politician who served as a Cabinet Minister during the entirety of the Hawke-Keating government from 1983 to 1996, most notably as Treasurer of Australia from 1993 to 1996 and briefly in 1991. He also served as Minister for Industrial Relations, Minister for Transport and Communications and Minister for Finance. He represented the Victorian seat of Gellibrand in the House of Representatives from 1972 to 1998.

== Early life ==
Willis was born in Melbourne on 14 April 1938. He is the son of Doris and Stan Willis; his father was a boilermaker who became a prominent trade unionist and served as federal president of the Boilermakers' Society of Australia and Boilermakers and Blacksmiths Society of Australia.

Willis spent his early years in North Melbourne. The family moved to Footscray in Melbourne's western suburbs when he was two years old. He attended University High School and went on to complete a Bachelor of Commerce at the University of Melbourne. He initially intended to work as a teacher but subsequently joined the Commonwealth Public Service as a research assistant in the Department of Labour and National Service.

In 1960, Willis resigned from the public service to work as a research assistant for future prime minister Bob Hawke, then working as research officer for the Australian Council of Trade Unions (ACTU). They worked closely together over a ten-year period, preparing and presenting national wage cases to the Commonwealth Conciliation and Arbitration Commission. In 1969, Willis replaced Hawke as research officer and advocate upon Hawke's election as ACTU president. He remained in the position until his election to parliament in 1972, with one of his last cases before the commission being a successful argument for gender equality in award wages.

== Political career ==
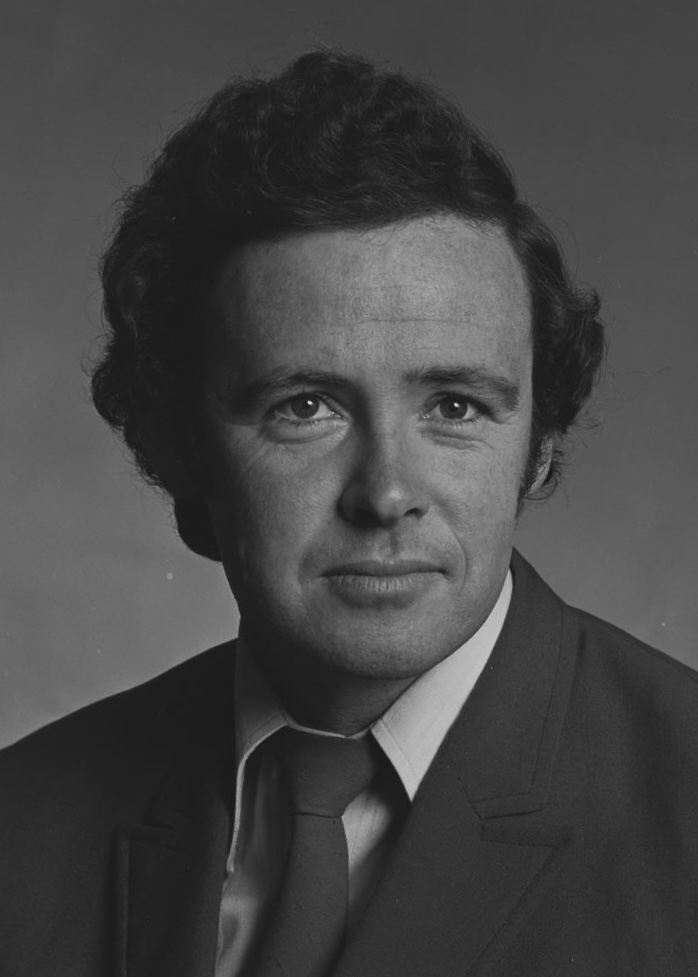
Willis in 1973.

In 1972, the year that the Whitlam government was elected, Willis was elected to the House of Representatives for the safe Labor seat of Gellibrand in Melbourne's western suburbs. After Labor's defeat at the 1975 election, Willis was appointed to the Shadow Cabinet, serving initially as shadow minister for industrial relations, and from 1980 as shadow treasurer. In January 1983, however, he was replaced as shadow treasurer by Opposition Leader Bill Hayden, who gave the position to Paul Keating in an unsuccessful attempt to shore up his own position as party leader.

=== Hawke government ===
As a former ACTU official, Willis was regarded as a protégé of Bob Hawke, and some expected Hawke to make him treasurer upon his election as prime minister in March 1983. However Hawke decided to appoint Paul Keating to the role instead, making Willis the Minister for Employment Relations and giving him a major role in establishing and overseeing the Prices and Incomes Accord, one of the central policy reforms of the Hawke government. Willis retained this role following the 1984 and 1987 elections, before being appointed Minister for Transport and Communications in 1988.

After the 1990 election, Willis became minister for finance. Following Keating's resignation as treasurer in June 1991 in an unsuccessful attempt to challenge Hawke for the leadership, there was media speculation that Willis would be given the role, but he was passed over a second time when Hawke ultimately decided to appoint John Kerin. However, Kerin's period as treasurer was troubled, and after Hawke was forced to sack Kerin for making a public gaffe in December 1991, Willis was finally appointed to the role of treasurer in his place.

=== Keating government ===
Willis's initial time as treasurer was brief as Paul Keating launched a second and this time successful challenge to Hawke, just three weeks later. Keating had long promised to appoint his close political ally John Dawkins as treasurer, and so Keating moved Willis back to the role of finance minister in order to accommodate this. Willis retained the role after Labor unexpectedly won a fifth consecutive election in 1993, and was expected to remain in the role until the sudden resignation of Dawkins in December 1993, who had grown frustrated with the role. Willis was duly appointed as treasurer for a second time by Keating, and was responsible for helping to roll-out the Government's major 'One Nation' economic package on which it had won the 1993 election, including a round of middle-income tax cuts and the establishment of a national infrastructure commission.

In late 1995, Willis was briefly acting prime minister when Prime Minister Paul Keating, Deputy Prime Minister Kim Beazley, Government Senate leader Gareth Evans (in his capacity as foreign minister) and Deputy Government Senate leader Robert Ray (in his capacity as defence minister) were all in Indonesia for the signing of a security agreement between Australia and Indonesia.

Willis remained as treasurer until the 1996 election, which Labor heavily lost; in the weeks before the election, Willis chose to unilaterally release a letter purportedly written by Liberal Victorian Premier Jeff Kennett. Known as the Ralph Willis letter, it suggested that a Coalition government led by John Howard would cut grants to the states. However, media examination quickly revealed the letter to be a forgery, allegedly foisted on Willis by Melbourne University Liberal Club students. This successful ruse had a significantly adverse impact upon the last week of Labor's campaign.

After the 1996 election, Willis chose to move to the backbench and announced his retirement from Parliament prior to the 1998 election. Willis was one of only three people to be a member of the Cabinet continuously during the Hawke-Keating government between 1983 and 1996, the other two being Kim Beazley and Gareth Evans. At the time of his retirement from Parliament, Willis was the last Labor MP from the time of the Whitlam government still serving, alongside Peter Morris who retired from Parliament with Willis. Following his retirement from politics, Willis has served on several boards of companies and charities.

== Honours ==
Willis was awarded the Centenary Medal in 2001 for long service to the Commonwealth Parliament. On 13 June 2011, he was named an Officer of the Order of Australia for distinguished service to the Parliament of Australia, particularly in the areas of economic development and industrial relations, to the superannuation industry, and to the community.

On 2 June 2009, Willis was conferred with the degree of doctor of the university Honoris Causa from Victoria University for services to Australia and in particular the Western Suburbs of Melbourne.

== Sources ==
- "2004 Federal Election". Australian Broadcasting Corporation.
- "Ralph Willis awarded Honorary Degree by VU".
- "Mietta Foundation Board Members Brief CVs". Archived from the original on 13 February 2005.
- "GELLIBRAND, Vic". Archived from the original on 20 January 2004.
- "Meet the Western Health Board".

Parliament of Australia
Preceded by Hector McIvor	Member of Parliament for Gellibrand; 1972–1998	Succeeded by Nicola Roxon
Political offices
Preceded by Ian Macphee	Minister for Industrial Relations; 1983–1988	Succeeded by Peter Morris
Preceded by Gareth Evans	Minister for Transport and Communications; 1988–1990	Succeeded by Kim Beazley
Preceded by Peter Walsh	Minister for Finance; 1990–1991	Succeeded by Kim Beazley
Preceded by John Kerin	Treasurer of Australia; 1991	Succeeded by John Dawkins
Preceded by Kim Beazley	Minister for Finance; 1991–1993	Succeeded by Kim Beazley
Preceded by John Dawkins	Treasurer of Australia; 1993–1996	Succeeded by Peter Costello
