= Nicola Roxon =

Australian politician

The Honourable Nicola Roxon
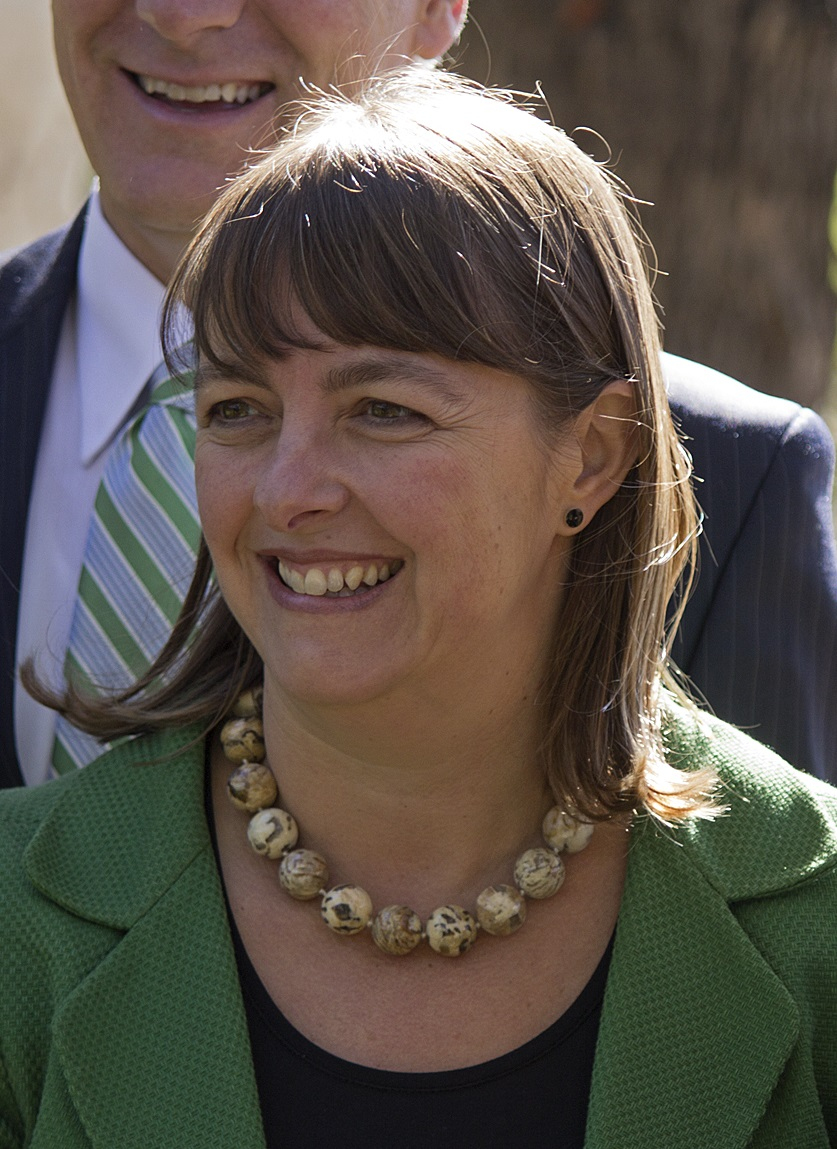

Attorney-General of Australia
- In office 14 December 2011 – 2 February 2013
- Prime Minister: Julia Gillard
- Preceded by: Robert McClelland
- Succeeded by: Mark Dreyfus

Minister for Health and Ageing
- In office 3 December 2007 – 14 December 2011
- Prime Minister: Kevin Rudd; Julia Gillard
- Preceded by: Tony Abbott
- Succeeded by: Tanya Plibersek (Health); Mark Butler (Mental Health and Ageing)

Member of the Australian Parliament for Gellibrand
- In office 3 October 1998 – 5 August 2013
- Preceded by: Ralph Willis
- Succeeded by: Tim Watts

Personal details
- Born: 1 April 1967 (age 59) Sydney, Australia
- Party: Labor Party
- Spouse: Michael Kerrisk
- Children: 1 daughter
- Education: University of Melbourne

Nicola Louise Roxon (born 1 April 1967) is an Australian former politician. After politics, she has worked as a company director and academic.

Roxon represented the lower house seat of Gellibrand in Victoria for the Australian Labor Party; from the 1998 federal election until her retirement in August 2013. Between 2011 and 2013, Roxon was the first female Attorney-General of Australia.

Post politics, Roxon was appointed an adjunct professor at Victoria University, board chair at VicHealth, and at HESTA.

== Early and personal life ==
Roxon was born in Sydney. She is the second of three daughters and the niece of the late Australian journalist and Sydney Push member Lillian Roxon. Her paternal grandparents were Jewish and migrated from Poland to Australia in 1937. Anglicising the family name from Ropschitz to Roxon, her grandfather worked as a GP in Gympie and Brisbane, Queensland. Her mother Lesley trained as a pharmacist, while her father Jack was a microbiologist. He was a strong influence in her life and she was devastated by his death from cancer when she was 10 years old.

Roxon was educated at the Methodist Ladies' College in the suburb of Kew in Melbourne. She studied for a Bachelor of Arts and Bachelor of Laws at the University of Melbourne, winning the university medal for law. She ultimately came to the view that "governments have got a role to make sure they can help people in circumstances they can't control—either through their health failing or an accident".

Between 1992 and 1994, Roxon was employed as a judge's associate to High Court Justice Mary Gaudron. She then became involved with the trade union movement, joining the National Union of Workers as an organiser. Roxon was also an industrial lawyer and senior associate with the law firm Maurice Blackburn and Co. from 1996 to 1998.

== Political career ==
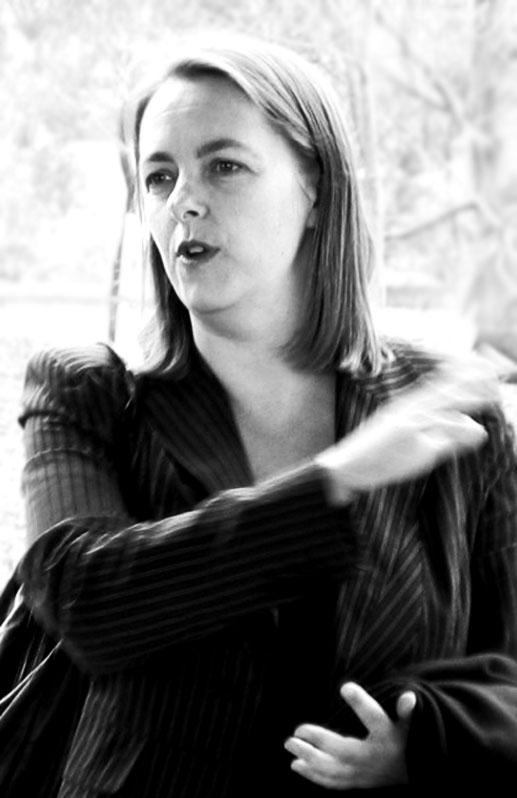
Roxon in 2008

Roxon was elected to the comfortably safe Labor seat of Gellibrand in 1998, succeeding longtime member Ralph Willis.

She served on a number of committees, including the Standing Committee on Industry, Science and Resources and the Joint Select Committee on the Republic Referendum.

Roxon was promoted to the Shadow Ministry after Labor's loss in the 2001 election. Initially, she was appointed Shadow Minister for Child Care, Family Support and Youth. Roxon then had a brief stint as Shadow Minister for Population and Immigration later that year, when Julia Gillard moved from the Immigration portfolio to Health. In 2003, new leader Mark Latham appointed her shadow Attorney-General and Shadow Minister Assisting the Leader on the Status of Women. She remained as Shadow Attorney-General following Latham's election loss in the 2004 election, holding this position until 2006. Kevin Rudd appointed her to the position of Shadow Health Minister upon his elevation to the Labor leadership in December 2006, and she retained the portfolio when Labor won government, replacing Tony Abbott as Minister for Health and Ageing.

Roxon made headlines during the 2007 federal election campaign when, on 31 October 2007, then Health Minister Tony Abbott arrived half an hour late for a televised debate. After apologising on behalf of the absent party to the audience of media and health industry figures, Roxon had the debate to herself and made light of the situation by stating that her staff felt she did a good impersonation of Abbott and could play his part. When Abbott arrived, he apologised for being late, but swore at Roxon when she claimed he could have been on time if he had wanted to.

=== Minister for Health ===
In February 2009, Roxon attempted to introduce legislation backing the alcopops tax increase into parliament.

In 2010, Roxon aimed to introduce major health reform in Australia. She said the Government would hold a referendum on hospital reform even if the Senate rejected the idea.

In 2012, Roxon was featured in the Australian Story television program in an episode entitled "Kicking The Habit", about her advocacy for plain cigarette packaging.

=== Attorney-General ===
Prime Minister Julia Gillard implemented a major change to her Cabinet on 14 December 2011. Roxon was promoted from Health and Ageing to become Australia's first woman to serve as Attorney-General. In a reshuffle announced on 2 March 2012, Roxon was given the additional portfolio of Emergency Management. She was sworn into that portfolio on 5 March.

In May 2012, Attorney-General Roxon announced that the Australian Government would not approach the British Government to seek a pardon for Harry "Breaker" Morant because Morant and his two fellow officers did, in fact, kill unarmed prisoners and others during the Second Boer War.

=== Resignation ===
Roxon resigned as Attorney-General on 2 February 2013. She continued as a backbencher for the remainder of her term, and retired when the parliament was dissolved before the 2013 federal election.

She was inducted onto the Victorian Honour Roll of Women in 2014.

== See also ==
- First Rudd Ministry
- First Gillard Ministry
- Second Gillard Ministry

Parliament of Australia
Preceded by Ralph Willis	Member of Parliament for Gellibrand; 1998–2013	Succeeded by Tim Watts
Political offices
Preceded by Tony Abbott	Minister for Health and Ageing; 2007–2011	Succeeded by Tanya Plibersek as Minister for Health
Preceded by Tony Abbott	Minister for Health and Ageing; 2007–2011	Succeeded by Mark Butler as Minister for Mental Health and Ageing
Preceded by Robert McClelland	Attorney-General of Australia; 2011–2013	Succeeded by Mark Dreyfus
