= Division of Gellibrand =

Australian federal electoral division

Coordinates: 37.836°S 144.846°E

Gellibrand Australian House of Representatives Division
- Interactive map of electorate boundaries from the 2025 federal election
- Created: 1949
- MP: Tim Watts
- Party: Labor
- Namesake: Joseph Gellibrand
- Electors: 118,992 (2025)
- Area: 144 km^{2} (55.6 sq mi)
- Demographic: Inner metropolitan
Electorates around Gellibrand:
Gorton	Fraser	Fraser
Lalor	Gellibrand	Port Phillip
Lalor	Port Phillip	Port Phillip

The Division of Gellibrand (/dʒɛlibrænd/) is an Australian Electoral Division in Victoria. The division was created in 1949 and is named after Joseph Gellibrand, a pioneer settler of the Melbourne area. It is located in the industrial inner western suburbs of Melbourne.

== Geography ==
Since 1984, federal electoral division boundaries in Australia have been determined at redistributions by a redistribution committee appointed by the Australian Electoral Commission. Redistributions occur for the boundaries of divisions in a particular state, and they occur every seven years, or sooner if a state's representation entitlement changes or when divisions of a state are malapportioned.

Gellibrand is located in the industrial inner western suburbs of Melbourne and includes Altona, Altona North, Altona Meadows, Kingsville, Laverton, Laverton North, Newport, Seabrook, Seaholme, Seddon, South Kingsville, Williams Landing, Williamstown and Williamstown North; and parts of Point Cook and Truganina.

== History ==
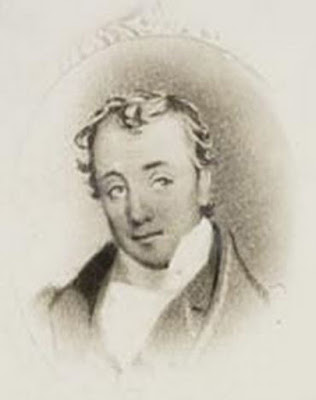
Joseph Gellibrand, the division's namesake

The Division has been held by the Australian Labor Party for its entire existence; it is located in Labor's traditional heartland of western Melbourne, and is characterised by a very diverse, multicultural population. Labor has never tallied less than 60 percent of the two-party vote, and until 2010 always won an outright majority on first preferences alone.

Its most prominent members have been Ralph Willis, a Cabinet minister in the Hawke and Keating governments, and Nicola Roxon, a Cabinet minister in the Rudd government and the Gillard government and first female Attorney-General.

In recent years there has been considerable gentrification in the inner-city suburbs such as Footscray, Williamstown and Yarraville, and a consequent rise in the progressive Greens vote, which rose to 37 percent in Footscray in the 2013 election. In the west, a solid patch of working-class suburbia remain strongly Labor-leaning.

For several years, Gellibrand was Labor's safest seat in the Federal Parliament. The current member for Gellibrand since the 2013 election is Labor's Tim Watts.

== Members ==
Image	Member	Party	Term	Notes
	Jack Mullens (1896–1978)	Labor	10 December 1949 – April 1955	Previously held the Victorian Legislative Assembly seat of Footscray. Did not contest and failed to win the Division of Melbourne in 1955
	Jack Mullens (1896–1978)	Labor (Anti-Communist)	April 1955 – 10 December 1955	Previously held the Victorian Legislative Assembly seat of Footscray. Did not contest and failed to win the Division of Melbourne in 1955
	Hector McIvor (1900–1992)	Labor	10 December 1955 – 2 November 1972	Retired
	Ralph Willis (1938–)	Labor	2 December 1972 – 31 August 1998	Served as minister under Hawke and Keating. Retired
	Nicola Roxon (1967–)	Labor	3 October 1998 – 5 August 2013	Served as minister under Rudd and Gillard. Retired
	Tim Watts (1982–)	Labor	7 September 2013 – present	Incumbent

== Election results ==
2025 Australian federal election: Gellibrand
Party	Candidate	Votes	%	±%
Labor	Tim Watts	49,044	46.62	+3.81
Liberal	Ben Reeson	27,539	26.18	−1.03
Greens	Ponraj Krishna Pandi	17,933	17.05	+1.47
One Nation	Stephen Bennett	6,290	5.98	+2.87
Family First	Jo Garcia	4,396	4.18	+4.18
Total formal votes		105,202	96.75	+1.72
Informal votes		3,538	3.25	−1.72
Turnout		108,740	91.41	+7.81
Two-party-preferred result
Labor	Tim Watts	68,489	65.10	+3.90
Liberal	Ben Reeson	36,713	34.90	−3.90
Labor hold		Swing	+3.90	
