= Johnson County School District =

School district in Georgia (U.S. state)

Address
- 221 Herschel Walker Drive Wrightsville, Georgia, 31096; United States
- Coordinates: 32.728489°N 82.72481°W

District information
- Grades: Pre-school - 12
- Superintendent: Dr. Christopher Watkins
- Accreditations: Southern Association of Colleges and Schools; Georgia Accrediting Commission

Students and staff
- Enrollment: 1,030
- Faculty: 75

Other information
- Telephone: (478) 864-3302
- Fax: (478) 864-4053
- Website: www.johnson.k12.ga.us

Johnson County High School

Location
- 150 Herschel Walker Drive; Wrightsville, (Johnson County), Georgia 31096; United States

Information
- Type: Public high school
- Principal: Reid Bethea
- Staff: 24.00 (FTE)
- Enrollment: 292 (2023-24)
- Student to teacher ratio: 12.17
- Colors: Blue and white
- Nickname: Trojans
- Website: Johnson County High School

The Johnson County School District is a public school district in Johnson County, Georgia, United States, based in Wrightsville. It serves the communities of Adrian, Kite, and Wrightsville.

== Schools ==
The Johnson County School District has one elementary school, one middle school, and one high school.

=== Elementary school ===
- Johnson County Elementary School

=== Middle school ===
- Johnson County Middle School

=== High school ===
- Johnson County High School
