= Christian Walker (media personality) =

Internet personality (born 1999)

- Born: September 30, 1999 (age 26); Dallas, Texas, U.S.
- Education: University of California, Los Angeles (BA)
- Occupations: Internet personality; comedian
- Years active: 2020–present

TikTok information
- Page: Christian Walker
- Followers: 1.3 million

Christian Walker (born September 30, 1999) is an American media personality on TikTok. He is the son of Herschel Walker, whom Christian exposed for various scandals during the 2022 United States Senate election in Georgia.

== Career ==
Walker joined TikTok in 2020 and originally posted content in support of conservative talking points. His account primarily represented his self-described position as a "free-speech radicalist" and a Christian "conservative populist." As a conservative content creator, Walker originally went viral in 2020 for calling the Black Lives Matter movement "ghetto" and a “terrorist organization.” Walker also has criticized Pride month and the pride flag as well. His content has been described as "spewing random GOP talking points in a Starbucks drive-through," and Walker has been in social media feuds with other celebrities, including Kehlani.

In 2020, Walker led a "Gays for Trump" parade in West Hollywood. Walker posted a photo of Trump praising him on election day in 2020.

=== Herschel Walker's 2022 Senate campaign ===
Initially during his father's 2022 Senate campaign, Christian Walker supported his father's run for office, appearing in at least one of his father's campaign events at Mar-a-Lago. After a Daily Beast expose, Christian Walker alleged Herschel Walker paid for abortions, despite his father's anti-abortion stance during the campaign. Christian Walker also alleged that his father was regularly violent to his mother. Christian Walker specifically identified the lack of a strong father as a major facet of his conservative content, and alleged that Herschel Walker's family all urged him not to run.

After his father's loss, Christian Walker criticized his father on Twitter, as well as the strategy pursued by the Georgia Republican Party. In 2023, Christian Walker criticized Matt Schlapp for sexually assaulting a male staffer during his father's campaign.

=== Content rebrand ===
In 2022, Walker moved back to California from Florida, despite originally decrying California's purported left-leaning ideals. Since 2022, Walker's content underwent a "rebrand", to appear "more middle of the aisle." Walker has removed much of his political content from his social media platforms, arguing that he no longer wishes to let politics and anger fuel his content.

== Personal life ==
In 2016, he won a competitive cheerleading award as a 16 year old. He went to school at University of California, Los Angeles, where he performed as a competitive cheerleader. As of 2022, Walker stated he does not identify with the label of gay, but is attracted to men.
