= Jack Mullens =

Australian politician

Jack Mullens CBE
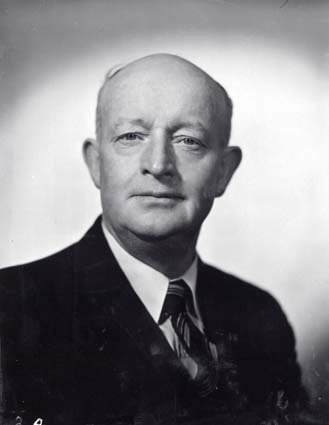

Member of the Australian Parliament for Gellibrand
- In office 10 December 1949 – 10 December 1955
- Preceded by: New seat
- Succeeded by: Hector McIvor

Personal details
- Born: 18 July 1896 Ballarat, Victoria, Australia
- Died: 5 September 1978 (aged 82) Glen Huntly, Victoria, Australia
- Party: Labor (1937–55); Labor (A-C) (1955)
- Spouse(s): Catherine O'Loughlin; Teresa Mary Clarke
- Occupation: Teacher

John Michael Mullens, CBE (18 July 1896 – 5 September 1978) was an Australian politician. He was an Australian Labor Party member of the Victorian Legislative Assembly from 1937 to 1945 (representing the seat of Footscray and an Australian Labor Party and then Australian Labor Party (Anti-Communist) member of the Australian House of Representatives from 1949 to 1955 (representing the seat of Gellibrand).

== Early life and career ==
Mullens was born in Ballarat East and educated at St Patrick's College, Ballarat. He was a clerk and then a school teacher before entering politics.

He was a Labor councillor of the City of Footscray from 1927 to 1930 and mayor from 1928 to 1929. In 1929, as Footscray mayor, he sharply criticised the decision of the McPherson state government to site livestock saleyards at adjacent Kensington. This led to McPherson personally threatening Mullens - in his day job a teacher at Francis Street State School in Yarraville - with disciplinary action for criticising the government while in its employ. The teachers' union expressed support for Mullens and newspaper coverage was generally critical of McPherson's actions, and two days later the state government announced that no action would be taken against Mullens. Mullens was defeated at the 1930 council elections, which saw the Footscray Labor councillors routed.

He also served as president of the Henry Lawson Memorial and Literary Society of Footscray, which was responsible for installing a memorial statue to Henry Lawson in Footscray Park.

Following his council defeat, Mullens resigned as a school teacher and became the licensee of a St Kilda hotel. He later sold his interest in the hotel, and was working as a salesman when he entered state politics in 1937.

== State politics ==
He was elected to the Legislative Assembly at the 1937 state election in the seat of Footscray, which had been left vacant by the death of former Labor leader George Prendergast two months before polling day. Parker Moloney had initially been selected as the Footscay candidate by the Labor central executive, but withdrew amidst a local backlash over being denied a vote, with Mullens then selected as the replacement candidate. Mullens went to easily win the seat. In his maiden speech, he again strongly opposed the still-proposed saleyards in Kensington.

Mullens was an outspoken anti-Communist in parliament and publicly campaigned against communist ideas. In 1944, Mullens proposed that the Arbitration Court should be given jurisdiction to oversee trade union elections, which sparked a hostile response nationally by several major unions. In his last term, he was vice-chairman and then chairman of the state public works committee.

The Footscray seat was heavily altered in a redistribution before the 1945 state election, and the new boundaries left Mullens and neighbouring MP Jack Holland, whose seat of Flemington had been abolished, facing a preselection battle for the Footscray seat. Mullens had been experiencing health issues, and was in hospital for a period in July 1945. He initially nominated to recontest, but then withdrew his nomination and did not contest the election.

It was reported that Mullens would be "offered a responsible administrative position" by the Commonwealth Government following his withdrawal from the Footscray preselection contest, and in 1946 he was appointed as a commissioner of the State Savings Bank of Victoria.

== Federal politics ==
In 1948, Mullens announced that he would seek Labor preselection for the new federal seat of Gellibrand at the 1949 election. It met with opposition from workers at the large Imperial Freezing Works in Footscray, who disliked Mullens due to his hostility to the meatworkers' unions active there. Mullens dismissed the opposition as Marxist "character assassination". Mullens comfortably won Labor preselection and went on to win the seat at the election.

In federal parliament, Mullens dissented from federal Labor's opposition to banning the Communist Party of Australia and clashed with federal Leader H. V. Evatt.

In 1955, together with six colleagues, he was expelled from the Labor Party and formed the Australian Labor Party (Anti-Communist). He contested Melbourne in 1955. Although he and all six of his colleagues were defeated in the elections of that year, the party itself became the Democratic Labor Party, which was instrumental in keeping Labor out of power in Canberra for twenty-three years.

In 1958, Evatt alleged in parliament that in 1955 Mullens had secretly met with federal Liberal Party president W. H. Anderson and various agents and arranged for the DLP to receive substantial financial assistance. He further alleged that Mullens had been placed on the payroll of a company linked to Anderson under a false name.

Mullens died at Glen Huntly in 1978.

Parliament of Australia
New division	Member for Gellibrand; 1949–1955	Succeeded by Hector McIvor
