= Tim Watts (politician) =

Australian politician (born 1982)

The Honourable Tim Watts MP
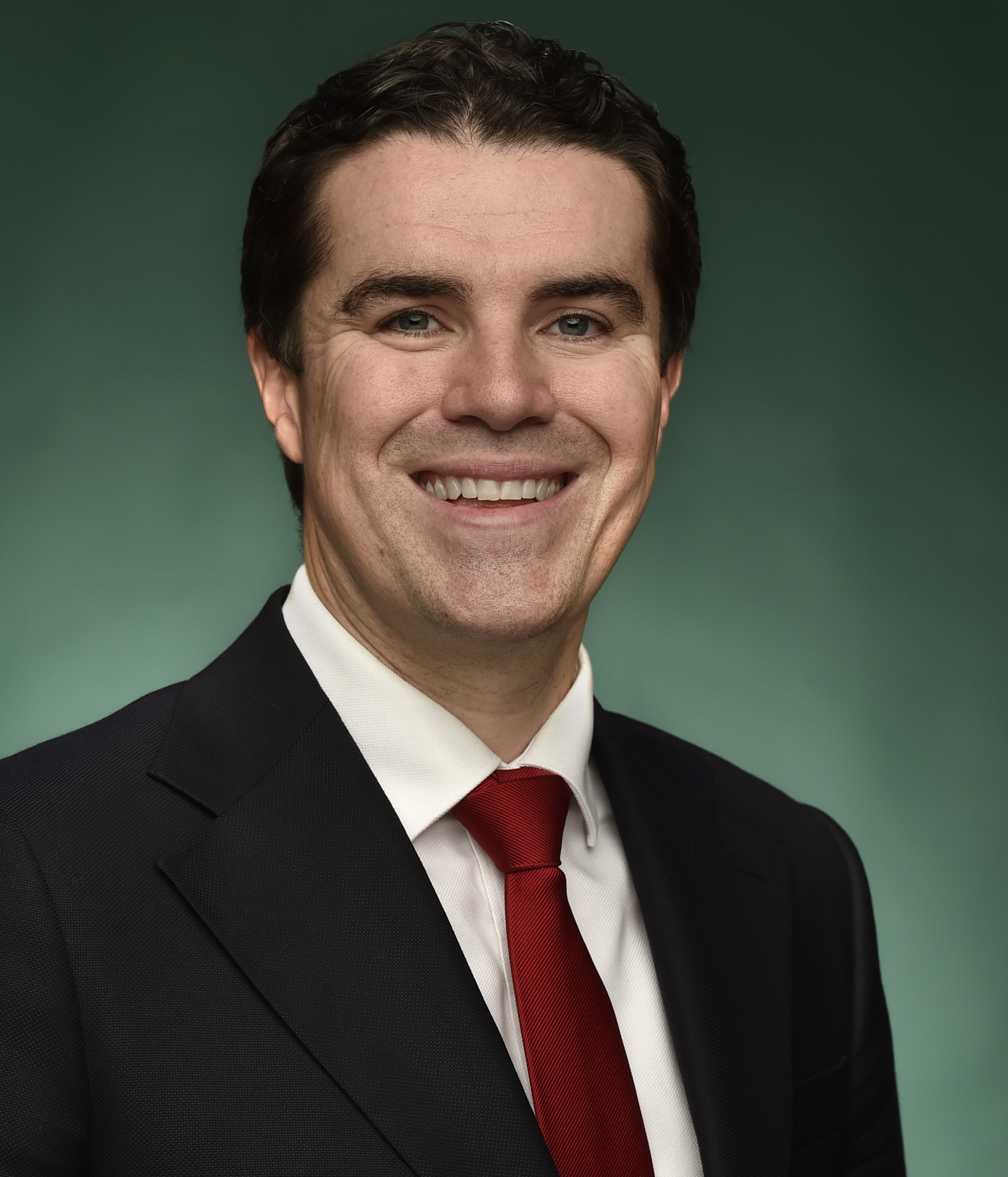

Special Envoy for Indian Ocean Affairs
- Incumbent
- Assumed office 13 May 2025
- Prime Minister: Anthony Albanese
- Minister: Penny Wong
- Preceded by: Position created

Assistant Minister for Foreign Affairs
- In office 1 June 2022 – 13 May 2025
- Prime Minister: Anthony Albanese
- Minister: Penny Wong
- Preceded by: Steven Ciobo (2015)
- Succeeded by: Matt Thistlethwaite

Member of the Australian Parliament for Gellibrand
- Incumbent
- Assumed office 7 September 2013
- Preceded by: Nicola Roxon

Personal details
- Born: Timothy Graham Watts; 8 June 1982 (age 44) Toowoomba, Queensland, Australia
- Party: Australian Labor Party
- Spouse: Joyce Kwok
- Children: 2
- Education: Bond University; Monash University; London School of Economics
- Profession: Lawyer
- Website: www.timwatts.net.au

Timothy Graham Watts (born 8 June 1982) is an Australian politician. He is a member of the Australian Labor Party (ALP) and has been a member of the House of Representatives since the 2013 federal election, representing the Victorian seat of Gellibrand. Since May 2025, he has served as the Special Envoy for Indian Ocean Affairs in the second Albanese ministry. From June 2022 to May 2025, Watts served as Assistant Minister for Foreign Affairs in the first Albanese ministry.

== Early life ==
Watts was born on 8 June 1982 in Toowoomba, Queensland. He is a descendant of John Watts, an immigrant from England who was a member of the first parliament of Queensland.

Watts attended Centenary Heights State High School in Toowoomba. He holds a Bachelor of Laws with Honours from Bond University, a Master of Public Policy and Management from Monash University and a Master of Science in Politics and Communications from the London School of Economics and Political Science.

== Career ==
Watts worked as a solicitor with Mallesons Stephen Jaques from 2003 to 2005. He subsequently worked for Senator Stephen Conroy as deputy chief of staff from 2005 to 2009, and briefly as a senior adviser to Victorian premier John Brumby. In 2009 he was recruited by Telstra to advise on the company's relationship with the new National Broadband Network, with the title of corporate relations manager. His appointment was seen as part of a strategy by the new CEO David Thodey to repair Telstra's relationship with the federal government, which had deteriorated under his predecessor Sol Trujillo.

== Politics ==
In April 2013, Watts won ALP preselection for the Division of Gellibrand, following the retirement of the incumbent MP Nicola Roxon. He was initially one of five candidates for preselection, including future senator Kimberley Kitching and Roxon's preferred candidate Katie Hall. However, the others withdrew prior to the final ballot. He reportedly had the support of Stephen Conroy's Centre Unity faction. Watts didn't live in the seat then.

Watts retained Gellibrand for the ALP at the 2013 federal election. In parliament he has served on a number of standing committees. Following the 2019 election, he was appointed to new leader Anthony Albanese's shadow ministry as an assistant shadow minister with the portfolios of communications and cyber security. In February 2021 he announced plans for a national ransomware strategy.

In 2020, Watts was mentioned in secret recordings made of ALP powerbroker Adem Somyurek, who described him as "bowing to me".

== Political positions ==
=== Family violence ===
Following the murder of Fiona Warzywoda in the electorate in 2014, Watts campaigned for preventing and removing family violence across Melbourne's West and Australia.

In 2014, Watts launched the bipartisan "Parliamentarians against Family Violence" with Coalition MPs Andrew Broad and Ken Wyatt. Australian of the Year, Rosie Batty addressed a meeting of the group in 2015, expressing that "Cross-party commitment is important to the issue of family and domestic violence".

In response, former Labor Leader, Mark Latham used a column in the Australian Financial Review to label Watts as "symptomatic of the decline in Labor's thinking" and argue that "Watts has fallen for the feminist line on domestic violence".

In 2015, Watts and fellow Labor MP Terri Butler introduced a private member's bill to criminalise the non-consensual sharing of private sexual material.

In an opinion piece published by the Chifley Research Centre, Watts called for action in response to the issue of family violence. He has written on the importance of engaging with the states, territories and relevant stakeholders, as well as the use of effective communication in achieving successful policy outcomes to the issue.

=== Foreign affairs ===
Watts has been an outspoken advocate of Australian Aid in the Parliament and has travelled to Cambodia and Papua New Guinea to visit Australian funded development programs in those countries.

Watts has been an advocate of greater Australian engagement in Asia, speaking frequently about Asian-Australian diaspora communities. He has been a delegate to a number of bilateral events such as the Australian Chinese Youth Dialogue, Australian Indian Youth Dialogue and CAUSINDY. He was also a program participant for the Asialink Leaders Course in 2017.

Watts has also written on the economic growth of Indonesia in recent years, stating "there is no other nation in Asia more important to our future than Indonesia". Subsequently, he has called for an increase to the cap on working holiday visas for Indonesians and argued that it is time Australians consider Indonesia as "critical" to both the economic prosperity and security of the country.

=== New Australian flag ===
Watts has written on the importance of multiculturalism in modern Australian society, and in doing so has called for a new Australian flag which does not bear the Union Jack. He described the importance of national symbols and the importance in ensuring they are reflective of the "modern, multicultural, Southeast Asian nation we have become".

== Publications ==
In 2015, Watts and Labor MP Clare O'Neil released Two Futures: Australia at a critical moment through Text Publishing, which sought to address long-term policy challenges facing Australia. In 2019 he released another book, The Golden Country: Australia's Changing Identity.

== Personal life ==
Watts lives in Footscray with his wife and two children. He has an investment property in Kingston.

From about 2006 to 2013, Watts was the author of a blog entitled "Blogging the Bookshelf", in which he discusses the books that he has been reading.

Watts supports the Western Bulldogs in the Australian Football League.

Parliament of Australia
Preceded by Nicola Roxon	Member for Gellibrand; 2013–present	Incumbent
Political offices
Vacant Title last held by Steven Ciobo as Parliamentary Secretary	Assistant Minister for Foreign Affairs; 2022–present	Incumbent
