= Hector McIvor =

Australian politician (1900–1992)

Hector McIvor OBE
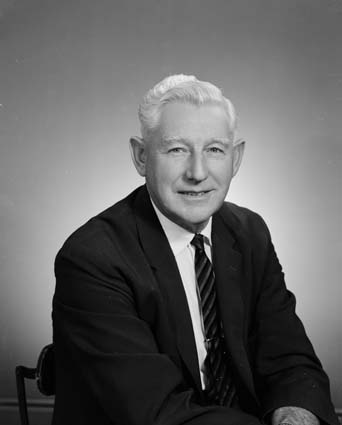

Member of the Australian Parliament for Gellibrand
- In office 10 December 1955 – 2 November 1972
- Preceded by: Jack Mullens
- Succeeded by: Ralph Willis

Personal details
- Born: 24 November 1900 Melbourne, Victoria
- Died: 12 May 1992 (aged 91)
- Party: Australian Labor Party
- Occupation: Oil company representative

Hector James McIvor, OBE (24 November 1900 – 12 May 1992) was an Australian politician. Born in Melbourne, he attended state schools before becoming a representative for an oil company. He was active in local politics as a member of Footscray City Council. In 1955, he was elected to the Australian House of Representatives as the Labor member for Gellibrand, succeeding the Labor-turned-Labor (Anti-Communist) MP Jack Mullens. McIvor held the seat until his retirement in 1972. He died in 1992.

Parliament of Australia
Preceded by Jack Mullens	Member for Gellibrand; 1955–1972	Succeeded by Ralph Willis
