= Hawke government =

Government of Australia (1983 to 1991)

Hawke government

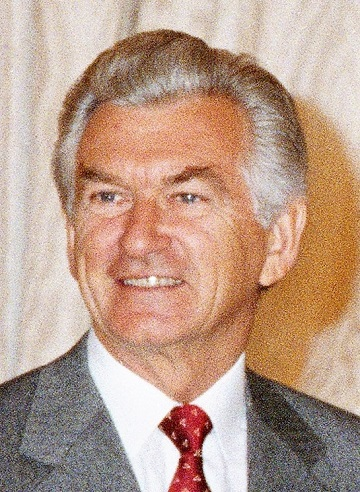

In office
- 11 March 1983 – 20 December 1991
- Monarch: Elizabeth II
- Prime Minister: Bob Hawke
- Deputy: Lionel Bowen (1983–1990); Paul Keating (1990–1991); Brian Howe (1991)
- Party: Labor
- Origin: Won 1983 election
- Demise: Hawke loses 1991 Labor leadership spill
- Predecessor: Fraser government
- Successor: Keating government

The Hawke government was the federal executive government of Australia led by Prime Minister Bob Hawke of the Australian Labor Party (ALP) from 1983 to 1991. The government followed the Liberal-National Coalition Fraser government and was succeeded by another Labor administration, the Keating government, led by Paul Keating after an internal party leadership challenge in 1991. Keating was Treasurer through much of Hawke's term as prime minister and the period is sometimes termed the Hawke-Keating government.

== Background ==
Bob Hawke was president of the Australian Council of Trade Unions (ACTU) from 1969 to 1980. On 14 October 1980, he was preselected as the Australian Labor Party candidate for the Seat of Wills and resigned from the ACTU. Hawke won the seat at the 1980 Election and was appointed as Shadow Minister for Industrial Relations, Employment and Youth Affairs by Opposition Leader Bill Hayden. In 1982, amongst the early 1980s recession, he initiated a leadership challenge against Hayden, and narrowly lost. At the February 1983 Funeral of former Labor Prime Minister Frank Forde, Hayden was persuaded by colleagues to step down, leaving the way open for Hawke to assume leadership of the ALP. In announcing his resignation, Hayden famously remarked that, given the electoral climate, "a drover's dog could lead the Labor Party to victory".

Long-serving Liberal prime minister Malcolm Fraser announced an election that same day, with a date set for 5 March. Hawke served just one month as Opposition Leader (and without sitting in Parliament as one) before taking the ALP to victory against Fraser at the 1983 Election. Labor had been out of office since the divisive Dismissal of the Whitlam government in 1975.

== Terms in office ==
Hawke led the Australian Labor Party to a landslide victory against Malcolm Fraser's Liberal-National Coalition government at the 1983 Australian Federal Election, with Labor seizing 75 seats in the Australian House of Representatives against the Liberal Party's 33 and the National Party 17. He went on to become Australia's longest serving Labor prime minister and remains the third longest serving Australian prime minister after Robert Menzies and John Howard.

Hawke again led the party to the 1984 Election and was returned with a reduced majority, in an expanded House of Representatives: with Labor taking 82 seats to the Coalition's 66. Labor went on to a third straight victory at the 1987 Election and increased its majority from 16 to 24 seats. Hawke fought his final election in 1990, with Labor winning a nine-seat majority. Hawke retired from Parliament in February 1992, following the December 1991 leadership spill which saw him replaced as leader by Paul Keating.

=== Early years ===
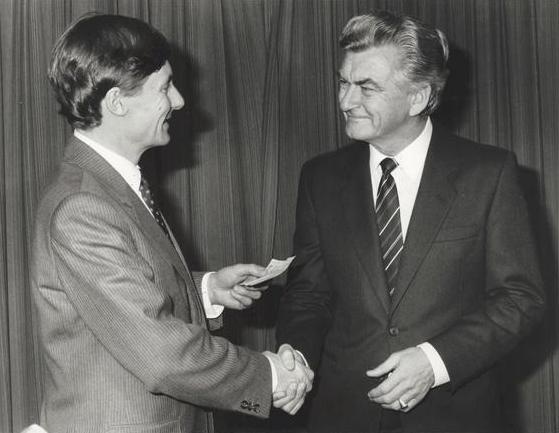
A cheque for Ash Wednesday bushfire relief to South Australian Premier John Bannon is presented by Hawke in April 1983.

The inaugural days of the Hawke government were distinctly different from those of the Whitlam era. Rather than immediately initiating extensive reform programmes, Hawke announced that Fraser's pre-election concealment of the budget deficit meant that many of Labor's election commitments would have to be deferred. Hawke convinced the Labor caucus to divide the ministry into two tiers, with only the most important Ministers attending regular cabinet meetings. This was to avoid what Hawke viewed as the unwieldy nature of the 27-member Whitlam cabinet. The caucus under Hawke exhibited a much more formalised system of parliamentary factions, which significantly altered the dynamics of caucus operations.

Hawke and Keating formed an effective political partnership despite their differences. Hawke was a Rhodes Scholar; Keating left high school early. Hawke's enthusiasms were cigars, horse racing and sport whereas Keating preferred classical architecture, Mahler symphonies, and antique collecting. Hawke was consensus-driven whereas Keating revelled in debate. Hawke was a lapsed Protestant and Keating was a practising Catholic, although the extent of his commitment to formal practices are debated . While the impetus for economic reform largely came from Keating, Hawke took the role of reaching consensus and providing political guidance on what was electorally feasible and how best to sell it to the public. In his first term, Hawke set the record for the highest approval rating on the ACNielsen Poll (a record which still stands as of 2008).

The government benefited from the disarray within the Liberal opposition after the resignation of Fraser. The Liberals were divided between supporters of John Howard and Andrew Peacock. The conservative Premier of Queensland, Sir Joh Bjelke-Petersen, also helped Hawke with his "Joh for Canberra" campaign in 1987, which proved highly damaging for the conservatives. Exploiting these divisions, Hawke led the Labor Party to comfortable election victories in 1984 and 1987.

In its first months in office the government stopped the construction of the Franklin Dam, on the Franklin River in Tasmania, responding to protest about the issue.

=== Economic policy ===
1983 ABC news report on the first day of trading with a floating Australian dollar.

The Hawke government came to power in 1983 amidst an economic downturn, but pursued a number of economic reforms that assisted in a strong recovery through the 1980s. Economic factors at play during the Hawke government were globalisation, micro-economic reform and industrial relations reform, as well as the opening of Australian finance and industry to international competition and adjustments to the role of trade unions. Hawke concluded his tenure during the worst downturn in Australia since the Great Depression.

Major economic reforms included the floating of the Australian dollar, deregulation of financial markets, dismantling of the tariff system, privatised state sector industries, ended subsidisation of loss-making industries, and the sale of the state-owned Commonwealth Bank, Telstra, Qantas and CSL.

Hawke's prime ministership saw friction between himself and the grassroots of the Labor Party, who were unhappy at what they viewed as Hawke's iconoclasm and willingness to co-operate with business interests. The Socialist Left faction, as well as prominent Labor figure Barry Jones, offered severe criticism of a number of government decisions. He has also received criticism for his 'confrontationalist style' in siding with the airlines in the 1989 Australian pilots' strike. The Hawke government did, however, significantly increase the social wage as part of its Accord with the trade unions, a social democratic policy continued by the Keating government. Improvements to the social wage included improved affordability of and access to key services such as health and child-care and health, together with large increases to payments for low-wage and jobless families with children. Indexation of child payments was also introduced, while coverage of occupational superannuation pensions was also widened significantly, from 46% of employees in 1985 to 79% in 1991.

During the course of the 1980s and early 1990s, government benefits substantially improved the incomes of the bottom 20% of households, with rent assistance, family payments, and sole parent benefits all substantially boosted in real terms. According to some historians, when examining the economic reforms carried out during the Eighties in both Australia and New Zealand, "some modest case can be mounted for Labor in Australia as refurbisher of the welfare state". From 1983 to 1996, improved service provision, higher government transfer payments, and changes to the taxation system "either entirely offset, or at the very least substantially moderated, the increase in inequality of market incomes over the period". During the period 1983 to 1996, Australia was one of the leading OECD countries in terms of social expenditure growth, with total social spending increasing by more than four percentage points of GDP compared to an OECD average of around 2.5 percentage points.

"Active society" measures were also introduced in an attempt to limit the growth of poverty and inequality. From 1980 to 1994, financial assistance for low-income families in Australia increased from 60% of the OECD average in 1980 to 140% in 1994, and it is argued that the social and economic policies delivered under the government-trade union Accord had some substantial success in reducing family poverty, as characterised by reductions in child poverty from the early Eighties onwards. According to the OECD, the percentage of Australians living in poverty fell during the Hawke government's time in office, from 11.6% of the population in 1985–86 to 9.3% in 1989–90. Child poverty also fell dramatically under the Hawke-Keating government, with the percentage of children estimated to be living in poverty falling from nearly 16% in 1985 to around 11% by 1995. As noted by Brian Howe, social policy under Hawke was effective in reducing poverty and protecting those most vulnerable to massive social and economic change. According to some observers, "improvements in government policies and programs in income support payments, and services such as education, health, public housing and child care, and the progressive nature of the income tax system, have all contributed to the result that Australia appears to have become a more equal society over the period from 1981–82 to 1993–94".

In 1984, the government introduced its three mine policy to limit the number of uranium mines in the Australia to three. The policy resulted from the strength of the anti-nuclear movement within Labor.

The 1987 budget extended rental assistance to all Family Allowance Supplement recipients together with longer-term unemployment benefit beneficiaries. A family package was introduced that same year, designed not only to improve the adequacy of welfare payments for low-income families, but was also designed to ensure that participating in part-time work or full-time work didn't lead to a loss in income support. The Hawke government's achievements in boosting financial support to low-income households were substantial, with the family assistance package bringing significant benefits to millions of low-income families in the years ahead. As noted by Ann Harding at the University of Canberra:

To appreciate the scale of these changes, let us look at the Browns, a hypothetical family. Mr Brown works for a low wage, Mrs Brown looks after two children, and they rent their home. In late 1982 the Browns received just under $13 a week in family allowance – about $25 per week in 1995–96 dollars. In contrast, in January 1996 a family like the Browns would receive $93.10 in family payment and up to $40 a week in rent assistance. You put this in perspective; such a family would have received assistance worth about 4 per cent of average weekly ordinary time earnings in November 1982, but 20 per cent of such earnings in early 1996. We are thus talking about very major changes in the amount of assistance available to low-income working families with children.

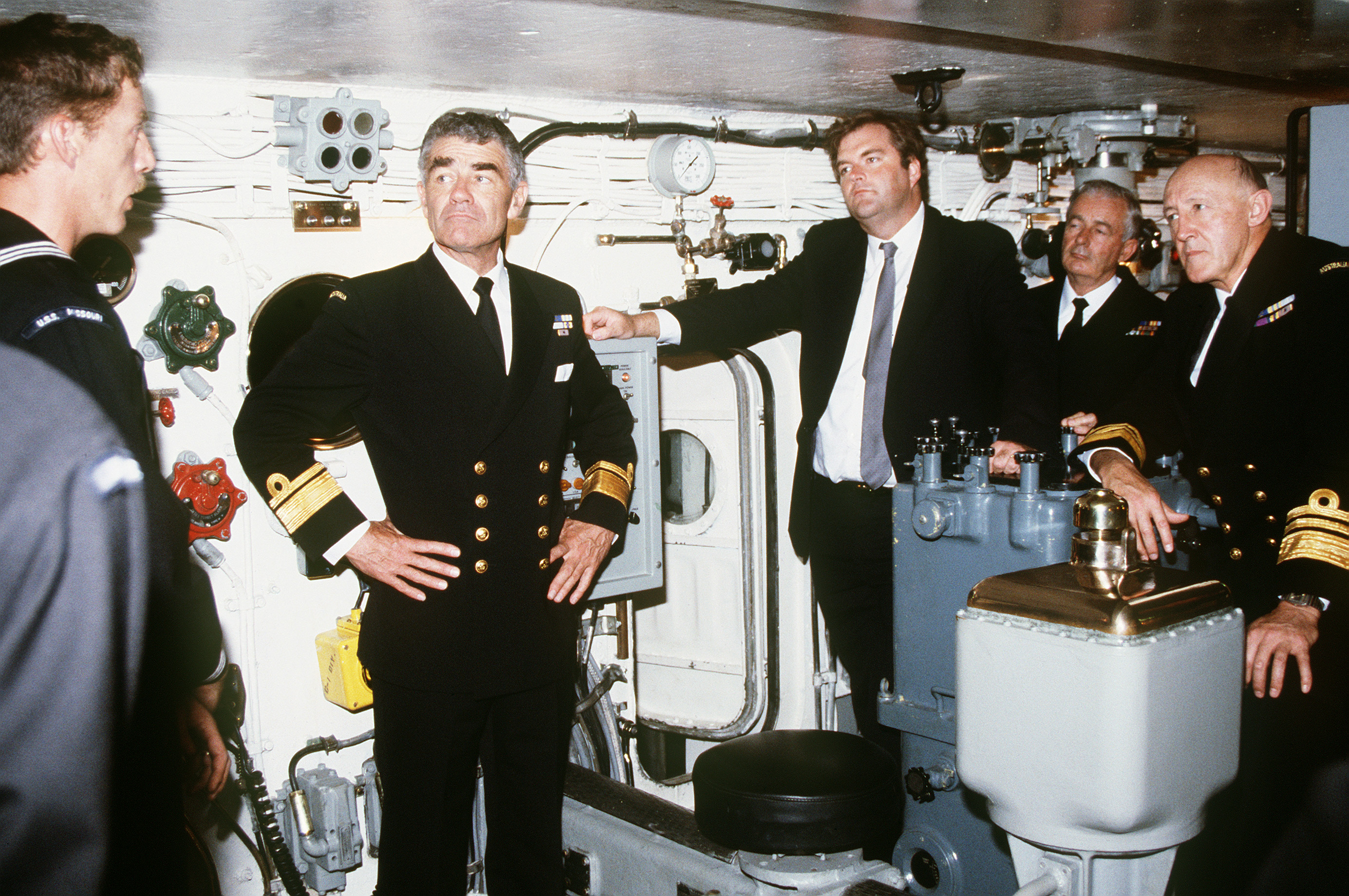
Defence Minister Kim Beazley (middle) in 1986.

The Hawke government carried out a series of other measures during its time in office. Upon taking office in 1983, a Community Employment Program was set up, providing a large number of work experience opportunities in the public and non-profit sectors. Together with smaller programs such as the Community Youth Support scheme (CYSS), this played a major role in both alleviating and reversing the effects of the 1982 economic recession. A Home and Community Care Program (HACC) was established to provide community-based services for frail aged people and people with disabilities, while to combat homelessness a Supported Accommodation Assistance program was introduced to assist those who are homeless, at risk of homelessness, or escaping domestic violence. A bereavement payment equivalent to fourteen weeks pension for the surviving member of a pensioner couple was also introduced, together with an Asylum Seeker Assistance scheme to provide help to applicants for refugee status in need. A wide range of measures were introduced to protect the environment., such a Landcare program, which was established to promote environmental conservation. In addition, spending on housing, education, and health was increased, while an anti-poverty trap package was introduced in the 1985 budget. That same year, rent assistance was extended to include unemployed and low-income working families. The 1985 Tax Summit led to a reduction of loopholes and distortions in the tax system, while the Family Assistance Package (introduced in 1987) significantly strengthened the amount of income support for hundreds of thousands of low-income families. Some sole parents and unemployed persons benefited from other measures designed to reduce barriers to workforce participation, deal with their housing costs, and increase their incomes. In addition, a new Child Support Agency was established, designed to provide a more efficient system of maintenance and tackle child poverty. Funding for public housing and disadvantaged students was also considerably increased. Various measures were also introduced which enhanced the rights of women in the workplace. The Sex Discrimination Act of 1984 prohibited sex discrimination in employment while the Affirmative Action (Equal Employment Opportunity for Women) Act of 1986 required all higher education institutions and all private companies with more than 100 employees to introduce affirmative action programmes on behalf of women. A year later, equal opportunity legislation for the Commonwealth Public Service was introduced. In 1986, a Disability Services Act was passed to expand opportunities for the participation of disabled persons in local communities.

A major cash benefit for low-income working households, known as the Family Allowance Supplement, was introduced which reduced poverty and provided a better-graduated system of family income support. This new benefit significantly boosted the level of income support for families principally dependent on social welfare benefits. The supplement was also made fully payable, tax-free, to low-income families who were principally reliant on wages, albeit for those who earned below a certain amount. Above that amount, the payment rate fell by 50 cents for every additional dollar of other income until it vanished entirely from families approaching the middle-income range. In addition, the social security rent allowance was extended to these families if they lived in private rental accommodation. The rates of payment were also index-linked to inflation, while additional benchmarks were fixed to help achieve and maintain relativities with community earnings levels. As a result of the FAS, major improvements were made in the financial position of working families on low incomes. In his memoirs, Hawke described this as "the greatest social reform of my government, and perhaps of all Labor governments".

To increase workforce participation, a Jobs, Education and Training Program (JET) for sole parents was launched, comprising a package of measures aimed at liberalising income tests measures, ensuring access to child care, and upgrading the skills of single parents. This reform (which haws introduced with the intention of combating high levels of poverty amongst single parents) helped to enable many single parents to take on part-time work and increase their earnings. Between 1986 and 1996, according to one estimate, the percentage of single parents receiving 90% or more of their income from benefits fell from 47% to less than 36%. Other important social security initiatives introduced for the unemployed included the introduction of the New Employment Entry payment, while some administrative obstacles and income tests were relaxed.

==== 1990s recession ====
In October 1987, the international Stock Market Slump saw markets crash around the world. The crisis originated when Japan and West Germany pushed up interest rates, pressuring US rates also to rise, triggering a massive sell off of US shares. Global share prices fell an average of 25%, but Australia saw a 40% decline.

The Hawke government responded to the crisis initially by asking the Conciliation and Arbitration Commission to defer its national wage case. Treasurer Keating was advised to tighten monetary policy, but, with forthcoming by-elections and a state election in New South Wales, the government opted to delay the potentially unpopular move, which would raise interest rates. Commodity prices dropped and the Australian dollar sharply declined. The Reserve Bank conducted a $2 billion intervention to hold the dollar at 68c but it crashed to 51c. In December 1987, Keating said that the Australian economy would weather the storm because the Hawke government had already balanced its Budget and brought down inflation.

The government postponed policy adjustments, planning a mini-Budget for May. Hawke wrote to US President Reagan calling on the US to reduce its Budget deficit. The Business Council called for wage reductions, decreased government expenditure, a lower dollar and deregulation of the labour market. Seven months into the crisis, Hawke told the State Premiers that the "savings of Australia must be freed" to go into business investment for export expansion, and funding to the States was cut. A phase out of tariff protections was continued and company tax was cut by 10% to 39%. In the May mini-Budget, payment to the states was cut by $870 million and tax cuts deferred. The government declared cost cutting was completed.

A surge in commodity prices began in 1986 and assisted the economy to a small 1987 surplus of $2.3 Billion. With commodity prices now over their peak, economic conditions were entering a decline, with high interest rates, a growing current account deficit, declining demand, increasing foreign debt and a wave of corporate collapses. Furthermore, the collapse of the Eastern Bloc economies, was to see wool and wheat prices decline, savaging Australia's agricultural sector.

Keating budgeted a record $9.1 billion surplus for 1989–90, and Labor won the 1990 election, aided by the support of environmentalists. To court the green vote, environment minister Graham Richardson had placed restrictions on mining and logging which had a further detrimental effect on already rising unemployment. David Barnett wrote in 1997 that Labor fiscal policy at this time "self-defeating as "with one hand it was imposing a monetary squeeze, while on the other it was encouraging spending with wage increases and tax cuts".

By July 1990, Australia was entering severe recession. Initially, the Treasurer had insisted Australia would face a "soft landing", but after receiving the September quarter accounts indicating a large contraction of 1.6 per cent, he adopted a different political strategy, instead arguing that the downturn was a necessary correction by opening a press conference in November as follows:

The first thing to say is, the accounts do show that Australia is in a recession. The most important thing about that is that this is a recession that Australia had to have – Treasurer Paul Keating, November 1990.

The popularity of Hawke's prime ministership, along with the health of the Hawke-Keating political partnership deteriorated along with the Australian economy and Keating began to position himself for a challenge. The government promised economic recovery for 1991 and launched a series of asset sales to increase revenue. GDP sank, unemployment rose, revenue collapsed and welfare payments surged.

The Opposition turned to economist John Hewson as its new leader. Hewson argued that the nation was in economic crisis. He said the Hawke-Keating government had increased the severity of the recession by initially encouraging the economy to boom post-stock crash as elections were approaching, which necessitated higher interest rates and tighter monetary policy than would otherwise have been necessary. Hewson called for a radical reform program and formulated a package which included a consumption tax policy and industrial relations reform to address the poor economic situation. The Fightback! policy was launched in November 1991. The comprehensive plan further destabilised Hawke's leadership.

The ACTU campaigned for a wage increase. Hawke brokered an increase for waterside workers and public servants. By April 1991, unemployment was nearing 10% and rising. On 3 June, Keating challenged Hawke for the leadership of Labor, but lost the vote and became a destabilising presence on the back bench. The new treasurer, John Kerin and deputy prime minister Brian Howe blamed Keating's 1990 economic policy for the poor state of the Australian economy. Industrial Relations Minister Peter Cook indicated an intention to introduce a more flexible wage system. In his July budget, Kerin forecast a deficit of $4.7 billion. In a press conference, Kerin was unable to recall what GOS – gross operating surplus – stood for. In December, shortly before Keating's successful second challenge against Hawke, Kerin was removed as treasurer and appointed minister for transport and communications and the minister for finance, Ralph Willis, became treasurer. Hawke attributed the change to loss of confidence in communication.

By 1992, shortly after Hawke lost office, unemployment had reached 11 per cent, the highest level in Australia since the Great Depression of the 1930s.

=== Health care ===
In health, the Whitlam government's universal health insurance system (Medibank), which had been dismantled by Fraser, was restored under a new name, Medicare while a Pharmaceutical Allowance was also introduced to help pay towards the cost of prescription medicines. The government's response to the AIDS concern is also considered to have been a success. In addition, nursing education was transferred from hospital-based programs to the tertiary education sector, while Australia's first ever national mental health policy was proclaimed.

=== Australia Acts and national symbolism ===
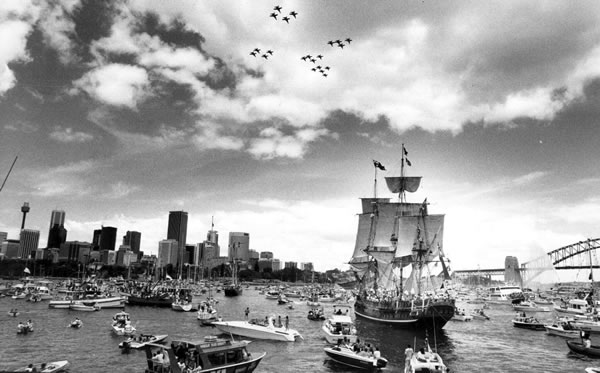
Tall ship First Fleet Re-enactment on Sydney Harbour, Australia Day, 1988.

In April 1984, the Hawke government proclaimed Advance Australia Fair as Australia's national anthem, settling an ongoing debate, and at the same time declared green and gold as the national colours of Australia.

The Hawke government secured passage of the Australia Acts in 1986, severing remaining constitutional ties to Britain: ending the inclusion into Australian law of British Acts of Parliament, and abolishing remaining provisions for appeals to the Judicial Committee of the Privy Council in London.

Canberra's New Parliament House was officially opened by Queen Elizabeth II in a grand ceremony in May 1988 and Australian Bicentenary was marked by huge pomp and ceremony across Australia to mark anniversary of the arrival of the First Fleet of British ships at Sydney in 1788. The government refused to fund the tall ship First Fleet Re-enactment Voyage which was staged on Sydney Harbour on Australia Day out of respect for Indigenous Australians.

=== Indigenous affairs ===
In 1988 Hawke was the first to promise a treaty between Aboriginal peoples and the government, after receiving the Barunga Statement from Aboriginal elders, which called for such a treaty to be concluded. Despite public interest and growing support, concerns were raised over possible implications of such a treaty, such as financial compensation, and no such treaty was ever concluded.

In 1984, Hawke appointed Charles Perkins as Secretary of the Department of Aboriginal Affairs, making him the first Indigenous Australian to head a Commonwealth department. In 1989 the Hawke government replaced the Department of Aboriginal Affairs with an Aboriginal and Torres Strait Islander Commission as the main administrative and funding agency for Indigenous Australians. The Aboriginal and Torres Strait Islander Commission began work in March 1990.

In 1985, the Hawke government officially returned ownership of Uluru (formerly known as Ayers Rock), with Governor General Sir Ninian Stephen presiding over the ceremony handing the title deeds to the local Pitjantjatjara people. The transfer was done on the basis that a lease-back to the National Parks and Wildlife Service and joint management by members of the local Mutijulu community would be settled upon.

In the final year of Hawke's prime ministership, the Royal Commission into Aboriginal Deaths in Custody released its final report, having investigated some 99 deaths between 1980 and 1989.

=== Multiculturalism ===
In 1986, the Australian Institute of Multicultural Affairs (AIMA), established in 1979 by the previous government, was dismantled by the Hawke government. In 1987 the Office of Multicultural Affairs (OMA) was created in the Department of the Prime Minister and Cabinet. This was partly because of a poor reaction to the 1986 budget, which led to the need for better information to be gathered on multicultural issues, and also because it was recommended by the Jupp Review of Migrant and Multicultural Programs and Services. Putting it in PMC gave multicultural affairs the same status as women's and Aboriginal issues. Peter Shergold was appointed director, who turned the focus on the economic benefits of a culturally diverse society. OMA advised the PM and Minister for Immigration and Ethnic Affairs as well as the newly-established Australian Council of Multicultural Affairs, with Justice Sir James Gobbo as chair.

In 1989, following community consultations and drawing on the advice of the Advisory Council for Multicultural Affairs (ACMA), the Hawke government produced the National Agenda for a Multicultural Australia, which had bipartisan political support.

After Keating became prime minister in 1991, the OMA was wound down, and was abolished in 1996 by the Howard government.

=== Education ===
In education, the Hawke government sought to significantly widen educational opportunities for all Australians. Increased funds were made available for most schools, while both TAFE and higher education were expanded. Measures were taken to improve educational opportunities for Aboriginal Australians, as demonstrated by the government providing funding of almost $100 million from 1984 to 1992 for parental education, student support and tutorial assistance through its Aboriginal Education Direct Assistance Program. In addition, an Aboriginal and Torres Strait Islander Capital Grants Program was established to construct and renovate school buildings in remote area communalities. Government expenditure on education under Hawke also rose significantly. On a per-student basis, the increase in Commonwealth funding amounted to 136% for government schools and 71% for non-government schools. A Participation and Equity Program was also established which provided around $250 million mainly to schools with low retention to the end of secondary education from 1983 to 1987.

Student numbers in training and vocational education (mainly in TAFE colleges) rose by over 25% under Hawke. University enrolments rose by almost 57%, from 357,000 in 1984 to 559,000 in 1992. The percentage of students in secondary education rose substantially, from 35% in 1982 to 77% in 1992, partly as a result of greater financial assistance to students from low-income backgrounds.

=== Introduction of HECS ===
In 1989, the Hawke Labor government gradually re-introducing fees for university study. It set up the Higher Education Contributions Scheme (HECS), which was first proposed by Professor Murray Wells and subsequently developed by economist and lecturer at the Australian National University, Bruce Chapman and championed by Education Minister John Dawkins (see Dawkins Revolution). Under the original HECS, a $1,800 fee was charged to all university students, and the Commonwealth paid the balance. A student could defer payment of this HECS amount (in which case it was called a HECS debt) and repay the debt through the tax system, when the student's income exceeds a threshold level. As part of the reforms, Colleges of Advanced Education entered the University sector by various means. The HECS system was accepted by both federal political parties and has survived until today, though with a number of changes.

=== Foreign affairs ===
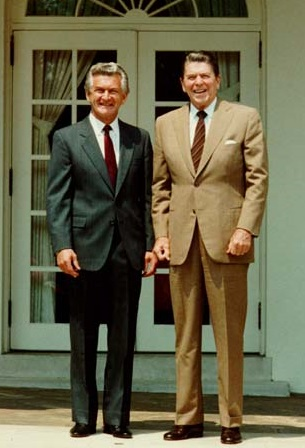
Bob Hawke with United States president Ronald Reagan in 1985.

Bill Hayden was Minister for Foreign Affairs in the Hawke government from 1983, until his 1988 resignation from Parliament to take up the position of Governor General of Australia. The portfolio then passed to Gareth Evans. Hawke sought to raise Australia's international profile in the United States, the Soviet Union, China, Japan and south-east Asia and also took an interest in the Israeli–Palestinian conflict.

With Soviet General Secretary Mikhail Gorbachev running his policy of Perestroika and Glasnost, Hawke visited Moscow in 1987 for discussions on trade and foreign policy. The Hawke government was the last Australian Government to operate within the international climate of the Cold War, which came to a conclusion in the aftermath of the 1989 Fall of the Berlin Wall. Hawke developed warm relations with Republican Party Presidents Ronald Reagan and George H W Bush, as well as Secretary of State George Shultz. By Hawke's own account, he was an enthusiastic supporter of the US Alliance, though, on various occasions, he had to persuade less enthusiastic members of his caucus to toe the party line. In 1985, the MX Missile controversy saw Hawke, under pressure from within the Labor Party, withdraw support for the splash down and monitoring of long range missile tests planned by the United States in Australian waters. That same year, the ANZUS Alliance was shaken by the decision of New Zealand to block visits by nuclear ships of the United States Navy at New Zealand ports. Hawke unsuccessfully lobbied New Zealand Prime Minister David Lange to change the policy and the ANZUS Treaty faced its most serious test.

As part of a policy of cultivating ties with neighbouring Indonesia, the Hawke government negotiated a zone of co-operation in an area between the Indonesian province of East Timor and northern Australia, known as the Timor Gap Treaty, signed between the governments of Australia and Indonesia. The signatories to the treaty were then Australian Foreign Affairs Minister Gareth Evans and then Indonesian Foreign Minister Ali Alatas. The treaty was signed on 11 December 1989 and came into force on 9 February 1991. It provided for the joint exploitation of petroleum resources in a part of the Timor Sea seabed which were claimed by both Australia and Indonesia and was considered controversial for its overt recognition of Indonesia's sovereignty over East Timor.

==== Gulf War ====
In the biggest mobilisation of Australian Forces since the Vietnam War, the government committed Australian naval forces to the 1991 Gulf War in support of the United States led coalition against the regime of Saddam Hussein, following the invasion of oil-rich Kuwait by Iraq on 2 August 1990.

The United States amassed a 30 nation coalition of some 30,000 troops and the UN Security Council issued an ultimatum to Iraq for the withdrawal. Operation Desert Storm, an air bombardment, followed by a 43-day war followed Iraq's failure to withdraw. The Royal Australian Navy (RAN) provided vessels for the multi-national naval force, patrolling the Persian Gulf to enforce the UN sanctions. The government elected to maintain an Australian naval presence in the Gulf following the surrender of Iraq and 1991 Peace Treaty. Ultimately, though Iraq withdrew from Kuwait, its failure to adhere to other conditions of the 1991 Treaty led to the second Iraq War a decade later. In an address to the nation explaining Australia's involvement, Hawke said that to protect small nations, sometimes "tragically", we must fight for peace.

=== Keating replaces Hawke ===
In 1990, a looming tight election saw a tough political operator, Graham Richardson, appointed Environment Minister, whose task it was to attract second-preference votes from the Australian Democrats and other environmental parties. Richardson claimed this as a major factor in the government's narrow re-election, and Hawke's last, in 1990. During Hawke's last months in office, employment assistance programs were expanded, while a Building Better Cities program was launched, promising higher investment in transport and other infrastructure, mainly in outer urban and regional areas.

Paul Keating became deputy prime minister following the retirement of Lionel Bowen in 1990. New economic challenges emerged in the wake of the 1987 New York Stock Market slump and the ALP lost ground at the 1990 Election. At Kirribilli House in 1988, Hawke and Keating had discussed the possibility of Hawke retiring after the 1990 Election and when Hawke refused to do so, Keating began to publicly hint at dissatisfaction at Hawke's leadership.

By 1991 Australia was in deep recession. By now the successful Hawke-Keating political partnership had fractured. Hawke's popularity had declined along with economic conditions. On 3 June, Keating challenged Hawke for the leadership, lost the party ballot and went to the backbench. John Kerin replaced Keating as treasurer after Keating resigned, although Bob Hawke himself was treasurer for a day after Paul Keating resigned. Kerin had been minister for primary industry but his period as treasurer was a difficult one, not least because of the ongoing tension between Bob Hawke and Paul Keating. Kerin resigned as treasurer shortly before Keating's second, successful, bid for leadership in December 1991.

On 12 December 1991, a group of Hawke's senior ministers – Kim Beazley, Michael Duffy, Nick Bolkus, Gareth Evans, Gerry Hand and Robert Ray – approached Hawke and asked him to resign. Hawke refused, but was persuaded to call another leadership spill for 19 December 1991. This time, Keating won a narrow victory, winning the leadership of the Labor Party and becoming Prime Minister of Australia on 20 December 1991.

== See also ==
- First Hawke ministry
- Second Hawke ministry
- Third Hawke ministry
- Fourth Hawke ministry
- First Keating ministry
- Second Keating ministry
