= 1991 Australian Labor Party leadership spill =

1991 Australian Labor Party leadership spill may refer to:

- June 1991 Australian Labor Party leadership spill
- December 1991 Australian Labor Party leadership spill
