= John Kerin =

Australian economist and politician (1937–2023)

The Honourable John Kerin AO FTSE
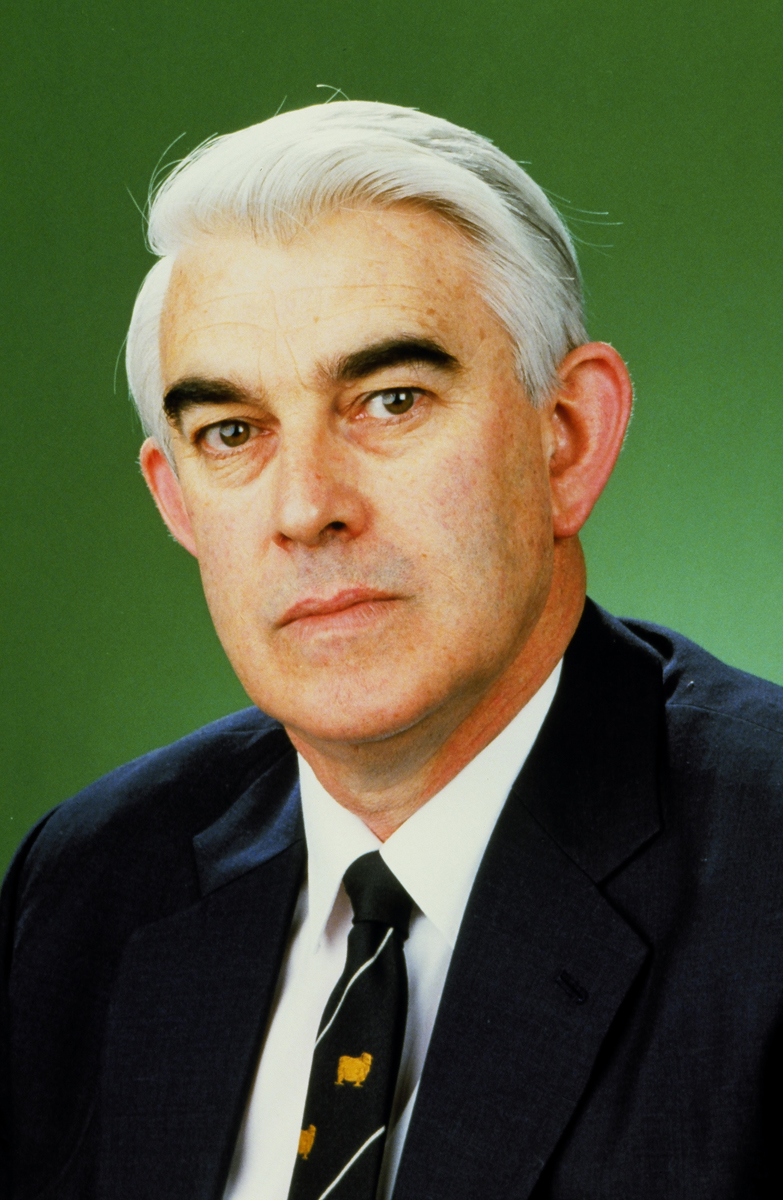

Minister for Trade and Overseas Development
- In office 27 December 1991 – 22 December 1993
- Prime Minister: Paul Keating
- Preceded by: Neal Blewett
- Succeeded by: Peter Cook

Minister for Transport and Communications
- In office 9 December 1991 – 27 December 1991
- Prime Minister: Bob Hawke; Paul Keating
- Preceded by: Kim Beazley
- Succeeded by: Graham Richardson

Treasurer of Australia
- In office 4 June 1991 – 8 December 1991
- Prime Minister: Bob Hawke
- Preceded by: Bob Hawke
- Succeeded by: Ralph Willis

Minister for Primary Industries and Energy
- In office 11 March 1983 – 3 June 1991
- Prime Minister: Bob Hawke
- Preceded by: Peter Nixon
- Succeeded by: Simon Crean

Member of the Australian Parliament for Werriwa
- In office 23 September 1978 – 22 December 1993
- Preceded by: Gough Whitlam
- Succeeded by: Mark Latham

Member of the Australian Parliament for Macarthur
- In office 2 December 1972 – 13 December 1975
- Preceded by: Jeff Bate
- Succeeded by: Michael Baume

Personal details
- Born: John Charles Kerin; 21 November 1937 Bowral, New South Wales, Australia
- Died: 29 March 2023 (aged 85)
- Party: Labor
- Profession: Economist

John Charles Kerin AO, FTSE (21 November 1937 – 29 March 2023) was an Australian economist and Labor Party politician who served in the House of Representatives from 1972 to 1975 and again from 1978 to 1993. He held a number of senior ministerial roles in both the Hawke and Keating governments, including six months as Treasurer of Australia and eight years as Minister for Primary Industries and Energy, holding the latter role for the longest period in Australian history.

== Early life and education ==
Kerin was born in Bowral in the Southern Highlands of New South Wales. Growing up in a rural area, he was educated at Hurlstone Agricultural High School and Bowral High School. He worked as a poultry farmer before later completing a Bachelor of Arts from the University of New England, Armidale, in 1967, and then a Bachelor of Economics from the Australian National University in 1977. In between studying for his two degrees, Kerin spent time working at the Australian Bureau of Agricultural and Resource Economics (ABARE).

== Political career ==
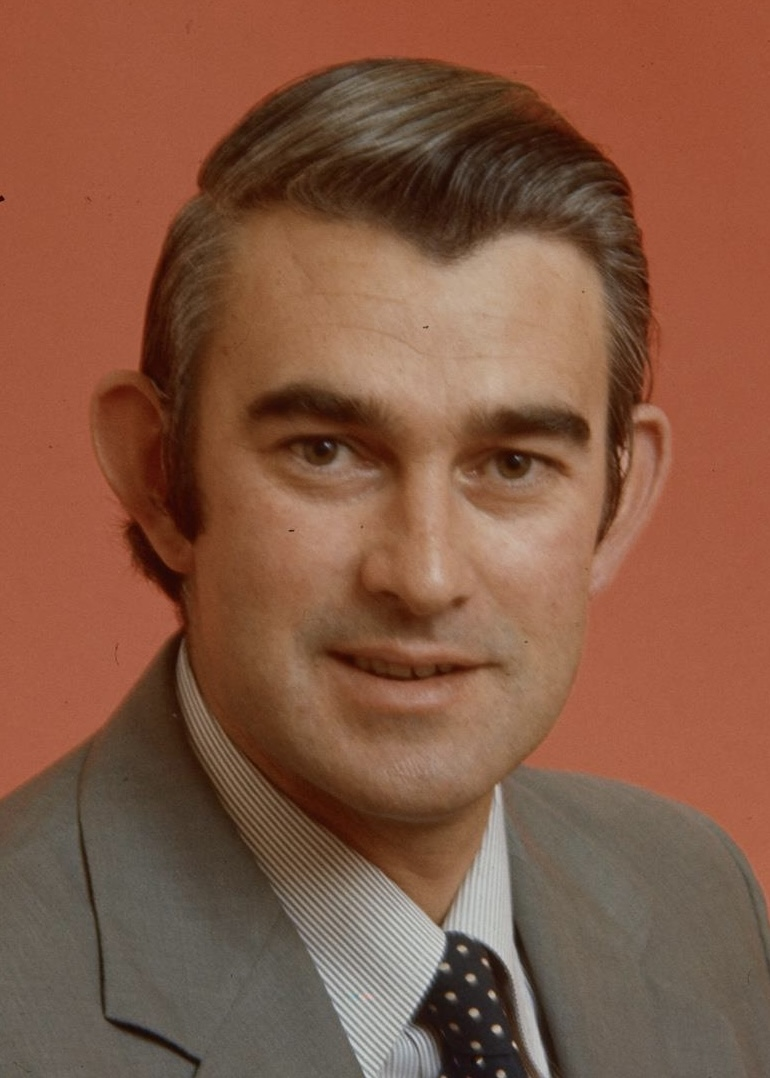
Kerin in 1974

Having joined the Labor Party as a student, Kerin was elected to the House of Representatives for the seat of Macarthur at the 1972 election. He remained on the backbench throughout the Whitlam government, but lost his seat in Labor's landslide defeat at the 1975 election, returning to work at the ABARE. He was later selected as Labor's candidate for the safe seat of Werriwa at the 1978 by-election caused by the retirement of former prime minister Gough Whitlam, who had held the seat since 1952.

After Labor's landslide victory at the 1983 election, newly elected Prime Minister Bob Hawke appointed Kerin as Minister for Primary Industries and Energy owing to Kerin's significant experience both in economics and working on commodities and agricultural policies. His background made Kerin a good fit for the role, and he remained in the position for almost the entirety of Hawke's time as prime minister, making him the longest-serving minister in this portfolio in Australian history on the Labor side, surpassed only by the Country Party's Sir Charles Adermann. During his time as Primary Industries and Energy Minister, Kerin played a key role in the Hawke government's numerous economic reforms, particularly the gradual abolition of most tariff protections on agricultural imports.

After Paul Keating resigned as Treasurer of Australia in June 1991 to mount an unsuccessful leadership challenge to Hawke, Kerin was appointed to replace him. Keating had been an influential and long-serving treasurer, as well as being Hawke's primary political partner, leading to significant and immediate media pressure on Kerin to see how he would compare. Kerin was highly regarded as Minister for Primary Industry. After an initially positive start, Kerin was judged by several journalists as failing to respond adequately to the Liberal–National Coalition's proposals for their new 'Fightback!' economic policy. Kerin was further undermined by hostile briefing by some from within the Labor Caucus, and ultimately his authority in office was fatally undermined when he made a public gaffe by appearing to forget the meaning of a gross operating surplus. Hawke felt that he had no option but to sack Kerin as treasurer, replacing him with Ralph Willis, and instead appointing Kerin as Minister for Transport and Communications.

However, his time in this role would be brief, as Keating mounted a successful challenge to Hawke's leadership less than a fortnight later. Having promised the portfolio of Transport and Communications to his close ally Graham Richardson, Keating moved Kerin to the role of Minister for Trade and Overseas Development. In this position, Kerin played a key role in preparing the groundwork for the APEC Leaders' Summit at which the Bogor Declaration would be declared, pledging significant movement towards free trade amongst Pacific economies. He was dropped from the ministry after the 1993 election and at the end of that year Kerin announced his retirement from Parliament, stating that he wished to move on to other things.

== Post-political career ==
After his retirement from politics in 1993, Kerin was appointed to a senior position at the Australian Meat and Livestock Corporation, and joined numerous boards of various charities and companies. Kerin remained active across a range of public policy issues in Australia. In October 2008 he was appointed to the board of the Commonwealth Scientific and Industrial Research Organisation. He was appointed the 2008 Distinguished Life Member of the Australian Agriculture and Resource Economics Society.

In October 2010 Kerin was appointed Chair of the Crawford Fund, a position he held until early 2017. The Crawford Fund aims to increase Australia's engagement in international agricultural research, development and education. In 2011 he resigned from the New South Wales branch of the Labor Party in protest at what he saw as the increasingly highly centralised nature of control over the operations of the organisation. He said that the administrative arm of the party had become increasingly involved in policy formulation, leaving little room for meaningful participation by rank and file party members. In August 2012, he rejoined the Party as a member in Canberra, where he stated he felt that local management of the party was more responsive to the concerns of members.

In 2017, Kerin released an extensive memoir of his experiences as Primary Industries and Energy Minister between 1983 and 1991.

Kerin died on 29 March 2023, at the age of 85.

== Honours ==
On 26 January 2001 Kerin was appointed a Member of the Order of Australia (AM). On 11 June 2018 he was advanced within the Order to Officer level (AO).

On 1 January 2001 Kerin was awarded the Centenary Medal.

Parliament of Australia
Preceded by Jeff Bate	Member for Macarthur; 1972–1975	Succeeded by Michael Baume
Preceded by Gough Whitlam	Member for Werriwa; 1978–1993	Succeeded by Mark Latham
Political offices
Preceded by Peter Nixon	Minister for Primary Industries and Energy; 1983–1991	Succeeded by Simon Crean
Preceded by Paul Keating	Treasurer of Australia; 1991	Succeeded by Ralph Willis
Preceded by Kim Beazley	Minister for Transport and Communications; 1991	Succeeded by Graham Richardson
Preceded by Neal Blewett	Minister for Trade and Overseas Development; 1991–1993	Succeeded by Peter Cook
