= Kirribilli Agreement of 1988 =

Political deal in Australia

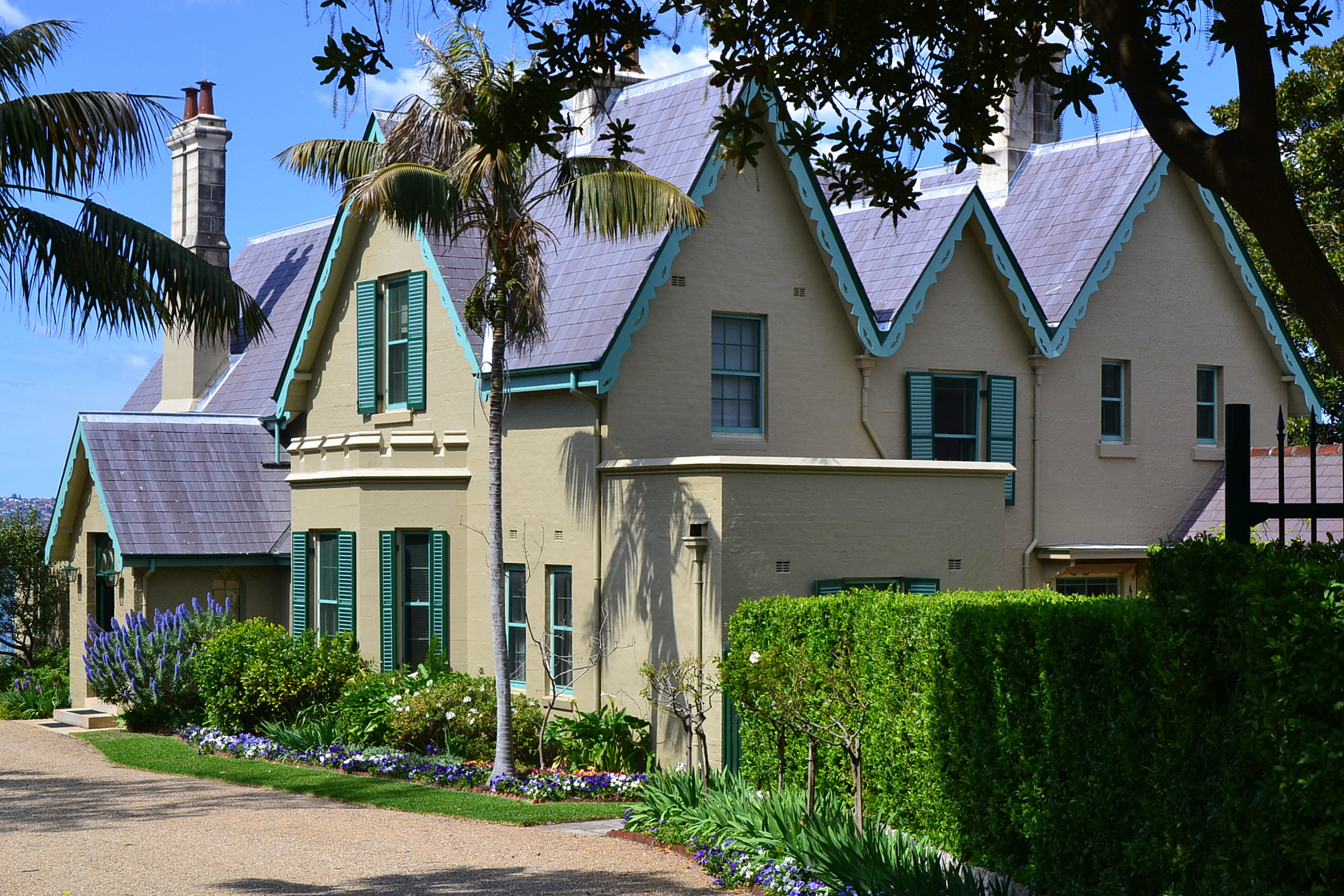
- Kirribilli House, the location of the deal
- Date: June 1988
- Location: Kirribilli House, Sydney
- Participants: Bob Hawke; Paul Keating; Bill Kelty; Sir Peter Abeles
- Outcome: Hawke reneged on the deal. Keating then twice challenged Hawke for the leadership in 1991, winning the second time, and becoming Prime Minister.

The Kirribilli Agreement of 1988 was a secret meeting between the Australian Prime Minister Bob Hawke and Treasurer Paul Keating. The two men met at Kirribilli House, the Prime Minister's official Sydney residence, to make an agreement as to when Hawke would hand over the leadership of the Australian Labor Party.

Several years earlier, while Labor was in opposition, Hawke was seeking the leadership. Keating was a primary figure of the New South Wales right faction, a key sector of the Labor Party. It is believed that Hawke told Keating that "two terms should do him". This resulted in Keating throwing his support behind Hawke, causing then-Leader Bill Hayden to resign and make way for Hawke to become Leader. In 1988, Hawke was enjoying high approval ratings, and leadership questions were not covered in the media often. Treasurer Keating wanted to make a formal agreement, with witnesses. Prime Minister Hawke invited ACTU Secretary Bill Kelty and Sir Peter Abeles to Kirribilli House, so that proper arrangement could be made. The two men came to an agreement, that presuming Hawke won the 1990 Australian election (which he did), he would step down as Prime Minister and hand over power to Keating – sometime during that term. Hawke made clear that if any details of their deal were made public, the entire agreement would be terminated.

As the years went on, the relationship between Keating and Hawke deteriorated. Hawke won the 1990 federal election with a very slim majority. After securing a fourth term in March 1990, Hawke reneged on the agreement in January 1991 following a "treacherous" speech by Keating, called the Placido Domingo speech, delivered to the National Press Club in December 1990 which belittled Hawke's leadership. During his final two years in office, Hawke's popularity collapsed. Unemployment from the global recession was continually rising, and the economy was being battered. In June 1991 Keating decided to challenge for the leadership of the Labor party, which Hawke decided to contest. Keating's leadership bid failed and he moved to the backbench.

During the final months of the Hawke Government, the economy weakened, and the government's popularity was falling, which prompted many high-profile Labor caucus members to throw their support behind Keating. Keating decided to challenge Hawke once more in December 1991. Keating won the leadership against Hawke, with 56 votes to 51. Keating was sworn in as Prime Minister of Australia on 20 December 1991. Hawke delivered his farewell address at Parliament House a day earlier.

In a biography of Hawke by Blanche d'Alpuget, Hawke's later second wife, d'Alpuget outlines a scathing attack on Keating and many senior members of his government. Meanwhile, Keating wrote a letter outlining his disapproval of Hawke's perceptions of him and leaked it to The Australian.

== See also ==
- Blair–Brown deal
