= Birthday cake (disambiguation) =

A birthday cake is a tradition in western culture.

It can also refer to:

- "Birthday Cake" (song), a 2011 sing by Rihanna
- "Birthday Cake", a song by Parachute Express
- "Birthday Cake", a song by Ivri Lider from the 2006 film The Bubble
- "Birthday Cake", a single by Cibo Matto from the album Viva! La Woman
- Birthday cake interview, an Australian political interview
- The Birthday Cake, 2021 a crime thriller film
- Birthday cake flavor, an artificial flavor profile
