= Birthday cake interview =

Australian political interview

- Date: 3 March 1993
- Time: 18:30
- Location: TCN, Sydney, Australia
- Cause: Hewson was unable to explain one of his Fightback! key tax policies on live television
- First reporter: Mike Willesee
- Participants: John Hewson
- Outcome: Thought to have contributed to Hewson's failure to win the 1993 federal election

The birthday cake interview was a live interview on Australian television in March 1993 in which Liberal Party Opposition Leader John Hewson was unable to clearly explain to reporter Mike Willesee whether a birthday cake would cost more or less under his proposed tax reforms. It is remembered as contributing to Hewson's unexpected failure as leader of the Coalition to win the federal election that took place ten days later.

== Background ==
After winning leadership of the Liberal Party, in November 1991 Hewson launched a comprehensive package of proposed reforms called Fightback!, after years of Australian Labor Party dominance in federal politics. The package included new social structures, industrial reforms and radical economic policies. One of its key elements was the introduction of a consumption tax called the Goods and Services Tax (GST), to be balanced by abolition of a range of other taxes such as sales tax, deep cuts in income tax for the middle and upper-middle classes, and increases in pensions and benefits to compensate the poor for the rise in prices flowing from the GST.

Labor Prime Minister Bob Hawke and his Treasurer John Kerin were unable to mount an effective response, and in December 1991, Paul Keating successfully challenged Hawke and became prime minister.

Through 1992, Keating mounted a campaign against the Fightback! package and, particularly, against the GST, which he described as an attack on the working class in that it shifted the tax burden from direct taxation of the wealthy to indirect taxation of the mass of consumers. He famously described Hewson as a "feral abacus".

== Interview ==
This assault forced Hewson into a partial backdown, agreeing not to levy the GST on food. However, this concession opened him to charges of weakness and inconsistency, and it also complicated the arithmetic of the taxes and benefits package by reducing the scope for the tax cuts, which were the most attractive elements of the package for middle-class voters. A particular problem was coming up with a precise legal definition for 'food'. The complications of the new package were demonstrated in the interview with Mike Willessee on 3 March 1993 on the Nine Network's A Current Affair, in which Hewson was unable to answer a seemingly straightforward question about whether a birthday cake would cost more or less under a Coalition government. He instead made a series of conditional responses about whether the cake would be decorated, have candles on it, and so on.

Willesee: "Can I just ask you a simple question as an example of this? If I buy a birthday cake from a cake shop and there- and GST is in place, do I pay more or less for that birthday cake?"

Hewson: "Well it will depend whether cakes today in that shop are subject to sales tax or they're not, firstly, and they may have a sales tax on them. Let's assume that they don't have a sales on them, then- then that birthday cake is going to be sales tax free, and of course you wouldn't pay- it would be exempt- it would s- there would be no GST on it under our system. If it was a s- one with a sales tax today, it would attract the GST and then the difference would be the difference between the two taxes, whatever the sales tax rate is on birthday cakes, how it's decorated, because there'll be sales tax perhaps on some of the decorations as well, and then of course the price- the price will reflect that accordingly. But the key point is that, uh, there- the average Australian will have more money in their pocket."

Willesee: "No, but just on the- just on the birthday cake, cause I tried to pick a simple example. You tell us in what you've published that the cost of cake goes down,...

Hewson: Mm.

Willesee: ...the cost of confectionary goes up..."

Hewson: That's right, there's-

Willesee: ...there's icing and maybe ice cream, and then there's candles on top of it.

Hewson: That's right, now that's the difficult- that's what I'm addressing in- in the question. To, uh, give you an accurate answer, I need to know exactly what type of cake to- to give a detailed answer. I mean, if it's just a cake from a cake shop that is not presently subject to sales tax...

Willesee: Yeah, ok.

Hewson: ...it will not attract the GST.

Willesee: But isn't- isn't that-

Hewson: If it is a cake shop- cake from a shop that has sales tax, and it's decorated in candles as you say, it attracts sales tax, then of course we scrap the sales tax...

Willesee: Yep...

Hewson: ...before the GST-

Willesee: Ok, it is just an example. If the answer to a birthday cake is so complex, you do have a problem with the overall GST, don't you?

== Aftermath ==
The following day, Keating paid a televised visit to a bakery, but the owner told him that although he disliked the proposed GST, taxes under the Labor government already had an adverse effect on his business. Keating appeared surprised that the owner paid both payroll and wholesale sales tax. The Coalition led by Hewson continued to be favoured to win the election on 13 March, with polls until election day predicting a Coalition victory.

However, Hewson was defeated. The birthday cake interview was widely seen as crucial in the loss of what many of his supporters had called an "unloseable election", making his tax proposal seem too complicated and Hewson himself ignorant about it.

After the election Fightback! was declared dead, and Hewson lost the Liberal leadership to Alexander Downer in May 1994 and retired from Parliament in 1995. The GST was dropped from the Liberal Party's agenda until the 1998 election campaign (by which time they had been in government for two years).

In August 2006, Andrew Denton conducted an in-depth interview with Hewson on the ABC TV program Enough Rope. Upon being shown footage of the birthday cake interview, Hewson commented, "Well I answered the question honestly. The answer's actually right. That doesn't count... I should have told him [Willesee] to get stuffed!" When asked what is was like returning to his parliamentary office after a "disaster" like that, Hewson replied "they were very quiet. Thought I'd done a superb job, which is a great worry, isn't it?"

Following Willesee's death on 1 March 2019, Hewson paid tribute to him on Ben Fordham Live, saying he "remember[s] him fondly" and "do[esn't] have any ill feelings towards him". Hewson remarked "these things happen, don't they? You get defined by those sorts of experiences and, um, you know, I've learnt from it". When asked by Fordham "now, how painful is it going to be if I just replay just a little bit of that famous interview?", Hewson replied "well, if you must," and chuckled. After hearing it again, Hewson called Willesee's query "good" and called his response "a particularly bad answer now that I hear it again". When asked whether he wanted to try again, he chuckled and said "no, not at all, mate". Fordham called him a good sport about it and Hewson replied "One of the things you learn in politics is that you can't afford to take yourself too seriously, a sense of humour matters a lot. It matters generally in life I think, but in politics you really do need to be able to look at yourself and have a bit of a laugh when, you know, you do something stupid or you do something wrong". Fordham remarked "Sometimes politicians come and go and they can be forgotten but if you're the subject of one of those famous moments, it means that, you know, you tend to live on and on and on, and sadly, with YouTube, that moment will be replayed millions of times today" and Hewson responded "Not exactly the place in history you'd want, is it?".
