= Kirribilli agreement =

Australian political leadership deal

A Kirribilli agreement (or Kirribilli deal), in Australian politics, is an agreement, typically confidential, between a leader and their deputy for the handing over of power on the satisfaction of an agreed precondition.

== Hawke – Keating ==
The term was first used to describe an agreement made in November 1988 between Prime Minister Bob Hawke, and his Treasurer Paul Keating, which was effected at Kirribilli House. Hawke agreed that he would resign in favour of Keating at an unspecified time after the 1990 election but before the subsequent election. On Keating's insistence, this undertaking was witnessed by ACTU Secretary Bill Kelty and businessman Sir Peter Abeles; both were mutual friends of Hawke and Keating. After securing a fourth term in March 1990, Hawke reneged on the agreement in January 1991 following a "treacherous" speech by Keating, called the Placido Domingo speech, delivered to the National Press Club in December 1990 which belittled Hawke's leadership. Keating resigned as Treasurer in June 1991 and challenged Hawke for the Prime Ministership. Although this initial challenge failed, he challenged Hawke a second time in December 1991 and won.

== Howard – Costello ==
Whilst still in opposition, John Howard reached a similar agreement with Peter Costello in December 1994 which was witnessed by the Liberal MP Ian McLachlan. McLachlan reported that Howard agreed, if Alexander Downer resigned and Howard became leader and subsequently Prime Minister after 1996, that he would hand over the leadership to Costello after one and a half terms. Howard reported that the meeting took place but that no exact deal was struck. After Howard became Prime Minister, approaching his 64th birthday and after two and a half terms in 2003, he asserted his intention to stay on as leader. Costello made several public statements that did little to hide his distemper at the decision.

After the 2004 election, Costello did not exercise his right to challenge for the leadership. Speculation throughout 2005 saw multiple cabinet ministers begin to be mentioned as possible successors to Howard, including Brendan Nelson, Alexander Downer, Tony Abbott and Malcolm Turnbull; of the four, Downer had already been Liberal leader and the remaining three would all serve as Liberal leader in the future. Costello fuelled speculation that he would challenge Howard for the leadership in 2006, but Howard ultimately remained Prime Minister and Costello Treasurer up to the 2007 election, where Howard lost his seat of Bennelong and his government was defeated. Costello declined to assume the leadership, even after Howard endorsed him as his successor.

== Other usage ==
The term has also been applied in various Australian state political environments including with Colin Barnett and Troy Buswell and with Mike Nahan and Liza Harvey in Western Australia; with Peter Beattie and Anna Bligh in Queensland; and in sport.

== See also ==
- Granita pact, a similar deal between Tony Blair and Gordon Brown for the prime ministership of the United Kingdom
