= December 1991 Australian Labor Party leadership spill =

December 1991 Australian Labor Party Leadership spill
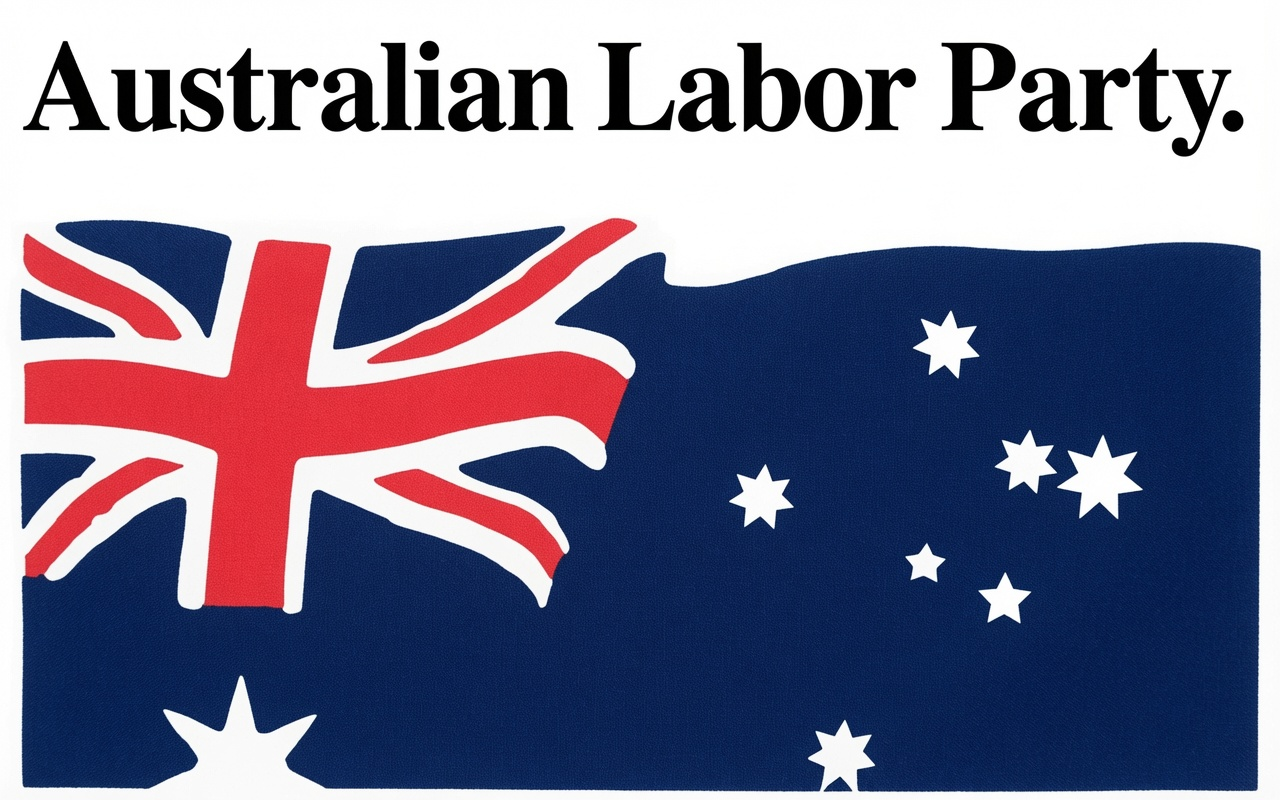
- 19 December 1991
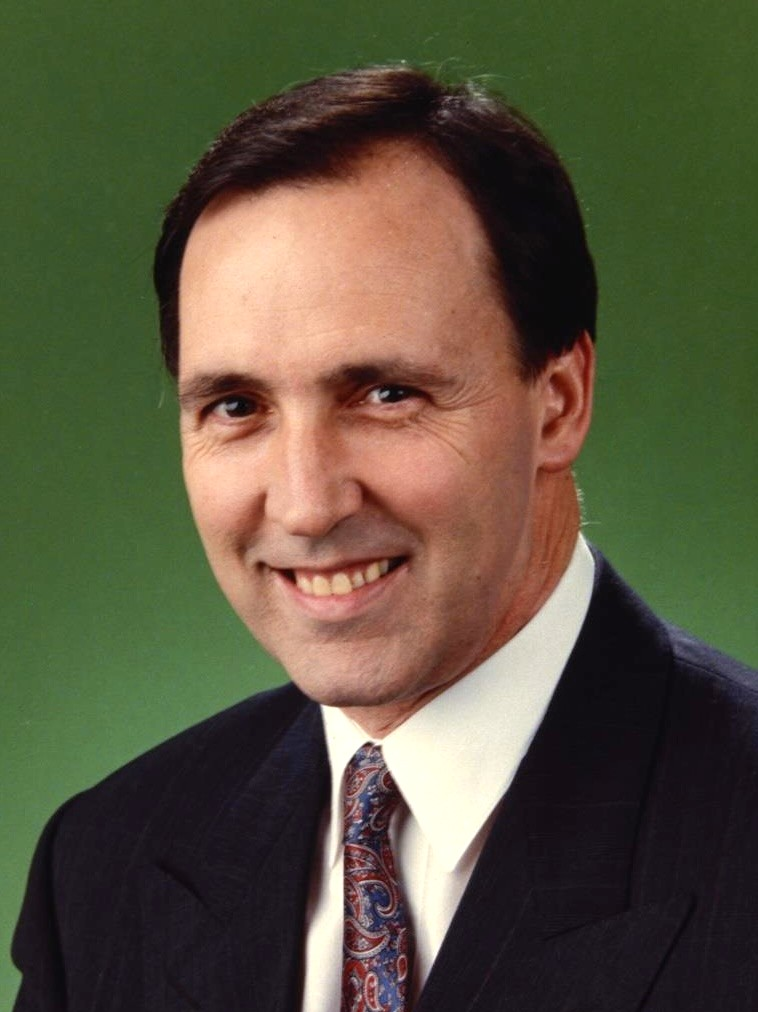

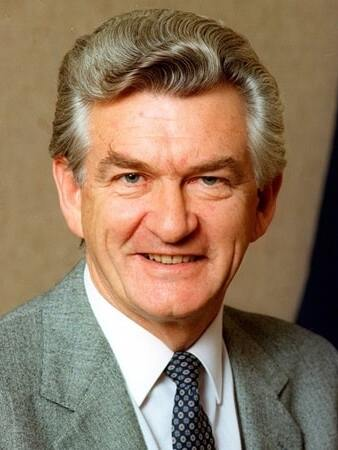
Candidate	Paul Keating	Bob Hawke
Caucus vote	56 (52.3%)	51 (47.7%)
Leader before election
Bob Hawke
Elected Leader
Paul Keating

A leadership spill of the Australian Labor Party (ALP), the party of government in the Parliament of Australia, was held on 19 December 1991, the second spill in a year. Backbencher and former treasurer Paul Keating defeated Prime Minister Bob Hawke, who had led Labor for eight and a half years.

== Background ==
Bob Hawke had been leader of the Labor Party since 3 February 1983, and prime minister since the 1983 election, with Labor winning a record four elections under his leadership. The unexpectedly close win at the 1990 election, coupled with the deepening economic recession, fuelled tensions within the government over economic policy, resulting in a breakdown of Hawke and Keating's previous "close cooperation". A re-energised Liberal opposition led by John Hewson, a qualified economist, gained ground in the opinion polls. Hawke had alienated key NSW Right powerbroker Graham Richardson in late 1990 by denying him the transport and communications portfolio, causing Richardson to support Keating as a leadership alternative, before bluntly telling Hawke he no longer had the support of the Right. He also reneged on an agreement with Paul Keating, known as the Kirribilli agreement, that he would hand over the leadership to him following the 1990 election. On 3 June 1991, Keating challenged for the leadership, but lost in a 66-44 vote and moved to the backbench.

By late 1991, Hawke's public support continued to decline as the Australian economy showed no signs of recovering from the recession and the opposition Liberals launched their Fightback! economic policy, without strong response from Hawke. The final straw was when Hawke sacked Keating's successor as treasurer, John Kerin for his perceived communication weaknesses in early December. Keating supporters began a campaign to undermine Hawke's leadership.

== Candidates ==
- Bob Hawke, incumbent leader, Prime Minister of Australia, member for Wills
- Paul Keating, former deputy prime minister, former treasurer, member for Blaxland

== Result ==
The following table gives the ballot results:

Name	Votes	Percentage
Paul Keating	56	52.3
Bob Hawke	51	47.7

Keating's second challenge was a success: he defeated Hawke by 56 votes to 51. Keating said Hawke had gone missing for four of his eight years as prime minister and had to be propped up by him.

Foreign Minister Gareth Evans was unable to attend the second ballot as he was overseas.

Evans, a Hawke supporter, was one of three Caucus members who could not vote on this spill. The others were another Hawke supporter Con Sciacca, as he was with his dying son, and Keating supporter Jim Snow.

Therefore if all three were in attendance Keating would still have won but with a vote of 57-53.

== Aftermath ==
Hawke resigned from Parliament shortly after losing the leadership, which resulted in Labor losing his seat to an Independent at the following by-election.

== See also ==
- June 1991 Australian Labor Party leadership spill
