= Bill Kelty =

Australian trade unionist (born 1948)

William John Kelty, AC (born 5 February 1948) is an Australian trade unionist and a well-known figure in the Australian labour movement, who served as Secretary of the Australian Council of Trade Unions (ACTU) from 1983 to 2000.

Born in Brunswick, Melbourne, Kelty was educated at La Trobe University where he studied economics. His professional union activity began in 1975 as a research officer for the Federated Storemen and Packers' Union (now part of the National Union of Workers).

He was a member of the Board of the Reserve Bank of Australia between 1987 and 1996. He resigned from the Board of the Reserve Bank on 4 March 1996 due to the election of the Howard Coalition Government two days earlier.

Kelty was an author of the Prices and Incomes Accord between the trade unions and the Labor government. He was Paul Keating's witness to the Kirribilli Pact concerning leadership of the Australian Labor Party. He has been a Commissioner of the Australian Football League (AFL) since 1998.

== Honours ==
Kelty was made a Companion of the Order of Australia in 2008.
