= Paul Keating =

Prime Minister of Australia from 1991 to 1996

The Honourable Paul Keating
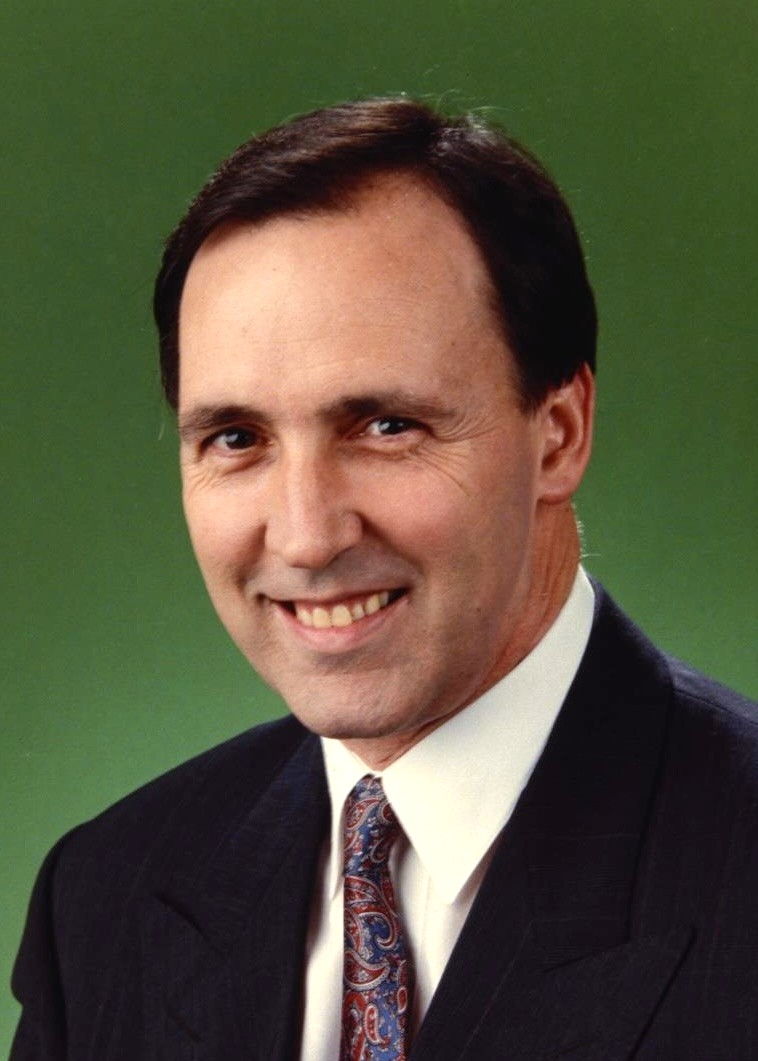
- Official portrait, 1993

24th Prime Minister of Australia
- In office 20 December 1991 – 11 March 1996
- Monarch: Elizabeth II
- Governors General: Bill Hayden; Sir William Deane
- Deputy: Brian Howe; Kim Beazley
- Preceded by: Bob Hawke
- Succeeded by: John Howard

14th Leader of the Labor Party
- In office 19 December 1991 – 19 March 1996
- Deputy: Brian Howe; Kim Beazley
- Preceded by: Bob Hawke
- Succeeded by: Kim Beazley
Previous offices 1975–1991
Deputy Prime Minister of Australia
In office 4 April 1990 – 3 June 1991
Prime Minister	Bob Hawke
Preceded by	Lionel Bowen
Succeeded by	Brian Howe
Deputy Leader of the Labor Party
In office 4 April 1990 – 3 June 1991
Leader	Bob Hawke
Preceded by	Lionel Bowen
Succeeded by	Brian Howe
Treasurer of Australia
In office 11 March 1983 – 3 June 1991
Prime Minister	Bob Hawke
Preceded by	John Howard
Succeeded by	John Kerin
Minister for Northern Australia
In office 21 October 1975 – 11 November 1975
Prime Minister	Gough Whitlam
Preceded by	Rex Patterson
Succeeded by	Ian Sinclair

Member of the Australian Parliament for Blaxland
- In office 25 October 1969 – 23 April 1996
- Preceded by: Eli Harrison
- Succeeded by: Michael Hatton

Personal details
- Born: 18 January 1944 (age 82) Darlinghurst, New South Wales, Australia
- Party: Labor
- Spouse: Annita van Iersel (m. 1976; div. 2008)
- Domestic partner: Julieanne Newbould (1999–present)
- Children: 4
- Education: De La Salle Catholic College; Belmore Technical College
- Profession: Trade unionist; politician
- Website: paulkeating.net.au
- Keating's voice Keating on the floating of the dollar 12 December 1983

Paul John Keating (born 18 January 1944) is an Australian former politician and trade unionist who served as the 24th prime minister of Australia and leader of the Labor Party from 1991 to 1996. He previously served as treasurer from 1983 to 1991 and as deputy prime minister from 1990 to 1991 under the prime ministership of Bob Hawke.

Born in Sydney, Keating left school at the age of 14. He joined the Labor Party at the same age, serving a term as State president of Young Labor and working as a research assistant for a trade union. He was elected to the Australian House of Representatives at the age of 25, winning the division of Blaxland at the 1969 federal election. He was briefly minister for Northern Australia from October to November 1975, in the final weeks of the Whitlam government - along with Doug McClelland, he is the last surviving minister who served under Gough Whitlam. After the Dismissal removed Labor from power, he held senior portfolios in the Shadow Cabinets of Whitlam and Bill Hayden. During this time he came to be seen as the leader of the Labor Right faction, and developed a reputation as a talented and fierce parliamentary performer.

After Labor's landslide victory at the 1983 election, Keating was appointed treasurer by prime minister Bob Hawke. The pair developed a powerful political partnership, overseeing significant reforms intended to liberalise and strengthen the Australian economy. These included the Prices and Incomes Accord, the float of the Australian dollar, the elimination of tariffs, the deregulation of the financial sector, achieving the first federal budget surplus in Australian history, and reform of the taxation system, including the introduction of capital gains tax, fringe benefits tax, and dividend imputation. He also became recognised for his sardonic rhetoric, as a controversial but deeply skilled orator. Keating became deputy prime minister in 1990, but in June 1991 he resigned from the ministry to unsuccessfully challenge Hawke for the leadership, believing he had reneged on the Kirribilli Agreement. He mounted a second successful challenge six months later, and became prime minister.

Keating was appointed prime minister in the aftermath of the early 1990s economic downturn, which he had famously described as "the recession that Australia had to have". This, combined with poor opinion polling, led many to predict Labor was certain to lose the 1993 election, but Keating's government was re-elected in an upset victory. In its second term, the Keating government enacted the landmark Native Title Act to enshrine Indigenous land rights, introduced compulsory superannuation and enterprise bargaining, created a national infrastructure development program, privatised Qantas, Commonwealth Serum Laboratories and the Commonwealth Bank, established the APEC leaders' meeting, and promoted republicanism by establishing the Republic Advisory Committee.

At the 1996 election, after 13 years in office, Keating's government suffered a landslide defeat to the Liberal–National Coalition, led by John Howard. Keating resigned as leader of the Labor Party and retired from Parliament shortly after the election, with his deputy Kim Beazley being elected unopposed to replace him. Keating has since remained active as a political commentator, whilst maintaining a broad series of business interests, including serving on the international board of the China Development Bank from 2005 to 2018. He has been critical of Labor Party policy such as AUKUS and urged closer relations with China and other countries in the Indo-Pacific region.

As prime minister, Keating performed poorly in opinion polls, and in August 1993, received the lowest approval rating for any Australian prime minister since modern political polling began. Since leaving office, Keating received broad praise from historians and commentators for his role in modernising the Australian economy as treasurer, although ratings of his premiership have been mixed. Keating has been recognised across the political spectrum for his charisma, debating skills, and his willingness to boldly confront social norms, including his famous Redfern Park Speech on the impact of colonisation in Australia and Aboriginal reconciliation.

== Early life and education ==
Paul John Keating was born on 18 January 1944 at St Margaret's Hospital in Darlinghurst, a suburb of Sydney. He is the eldest of four children born to Minnie Therese "Min" (née Chapman; 1920–2015) and Matthew John "Matt" Keating (1918–1978), a boilermaker who worked for the New South Wales Government Railways. On his father's side, Keating was descended from Irish immigrants born in counties Galway, Roscommon, and Tipperary. On his mother's side, he was of mixed English and Irish descent. Keating's maternal grandfather, Fred Chapman, was the son of two convicts, John Chapman and Sarah Gallagher, both of whom had been transported to Australia from England and Ireland respectively for theft in the 1830s.

Keating grew up in Bankstown, a working-class suburb in western Sydney, the family home from 1942 to 1966 being a modest fibro-and-brick bungalow at 3 Marshall Street (demolished for flat development in 2014). The suburb was nicknamed "Irishtown" during Keating's childhood, and sectarian antagonisms between Protestants and Roman Catholics were commonplace. Keating's upbringing was Catholic, with his father being involved with anti-Communist workers' organisations and Catholic social teaching having a significant impact on Keating's social perspective. His siblings include Anne Keating, a company director and businesswoman.

Leaving De La Salle College — now known as LaSalle Catholic College — at the age of 14, Keating left high school rather than pursuing higher education, instead working as a pay clerk at the Sydney County Council's electricity distributor. Keating also attended Belmore Technical High School to further his education. He then worked as research assistant for a trade union, having joined the Labor Party as soon as he was eligible. In 1966, he became president of New South Wales Young Labor. During the 1960s, Keating also managed a rock band named The Ramrods.

== Early political career ==
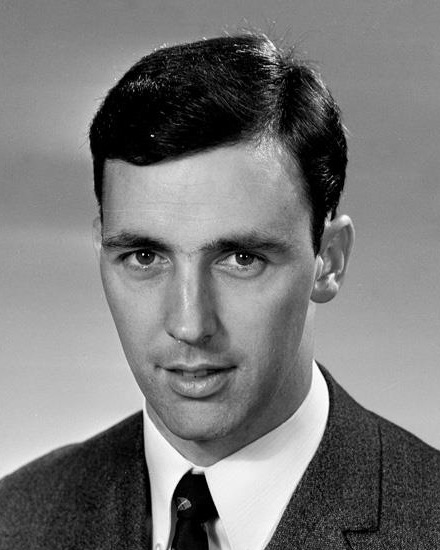
Keating in 1970, shortly after he was first elected to Parliament

Through his contacts in the unions and Young Labor, then known as Youth Council, Keating met future senior Labor figures such as Laurie Brereton, Graham Richardson and Bob Carr. He also developed a friendship with former New South Wales Premier Jack Lang, who Keating took on as a political mentor. In 1971, he succeeded in having Lang re-admitted to the Labor Party. Keating successfully gained the Labor nomination for the seat of Blaxland in the western suburbs of Sydney, and was elected to the House of Representatives in 1969 when he was just 25 years old.

Keating was initially more socially conservative; in his maiden speech he declared that the Liberal government had "boasted about the increasing number of women in the workforce. Rather than something to be proud of, I feel it is something of which we should be ashamed". He later voted against former prime minister John Gorton's motion to decriminalise homosexuality in 1973. According to Tom Uren he was originally a "very narrow-minded young man", who later "matured" and became far less socially conservative.

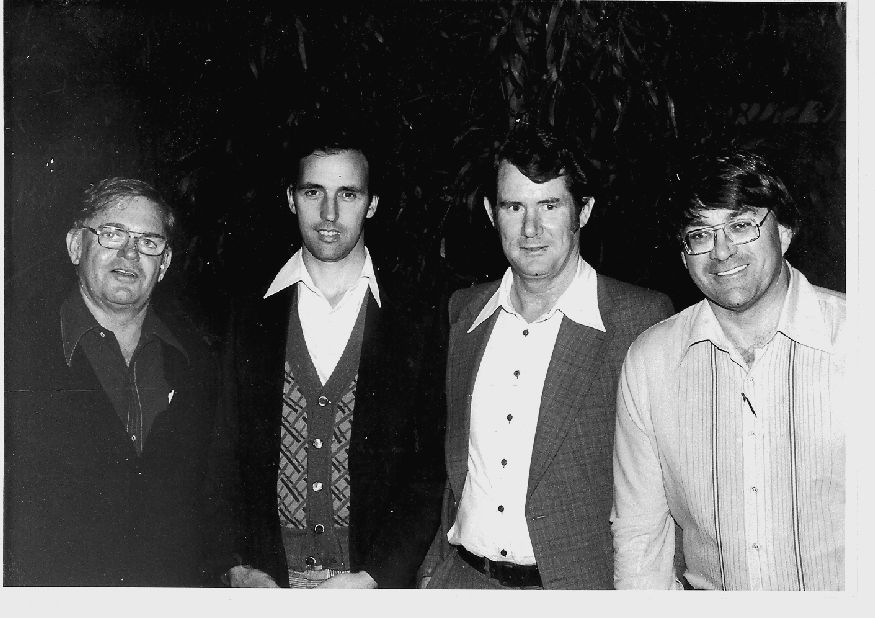
Keating aged 34, second from left, with Labor figures (from left) Colin Jamieson, Peter Walsh and Stewart West in Wickham, 1978

After Labor's victory at the 1972 election, Keating narrowly failed to be elected to serve in the Cabinet, instead being a backbencher for most of the Whitlam government. He was eventually appointed Minister for Northern Australia in October 1975, but served in the role only until the Government was controversially dismissed by Governor-General John Kerr the following month. In a 2013 interview with Kerry O'Brien, Keating called the dismissal a "coup" and raised the idea to "arrest [Kerr]" and "lock him up", adding that he would not have "[taken] it lying down" if he was prime minister.

After Labor's defeat in the 1975 election, Keating was quickly added to the Shadow Cabinet, serving as Shadow Minister for Minerals, Resources and Energy until January 1983. During this time he achieved a reputation as a flamboyant and fierce parliamentary performer, adopting the style of an aggressive debater. In 1981, he was elected president of the New South Wales Labor Party, thus becoming the leader of the influential Labor Right faction. At this time, he initially supported the former treasurer Bill Hayden for Labor Leader over the former ACTU President Bob Hawke as leadership tensions between the two men began to mount; he later explained that part of his reasoning was that he privately hoped to succeed Hayden himself in the near future. However, by 1982, the members of his faction had swung behind Hawke, and Keating endorsed his challenge. The formal announcement of Keating's support for Hawke was written by a fellow Labor politician, Gareth Evans.

Although Hayden survived the challenge, pressure continued to mount on him. In an attempt to shore up his position, Hayden promoted Keating to the role of Shadow Treasurer in January 1983. However this did not prove sufficient and Hayden resigned a month later, after a poor by-election result in the federal electorate of Flinders in Victoria. Hawke was elected unopposed to replace him and Hawke subsequently led Labor to a landslide victory in the 1983 election just six weeks later.

== Treasurer of Australia ==
=== Early days ===
Following Labor's victory in the 1983 election, Keating was appointed Treasurer of Australia by Prime Minister Bob Hawke; he succeeded John Howard in the position. He and Hawke were able to use the size of the budget deficit that the Hawke government had inherited from the Fraser government to question the economic credibility of the Liberal-National Coalition over the coming years. According to Hawke, the historically large $9.6 billion budget deficit left by the Coalition "became a stick with which we were justifiably able to beat the Opposition". Although Howard was widely regarded at this time as being "discredited" by the hidden deficit, he had in fact argued unsuccessfully against Fraser that the revised figures should be disclosed before the election.

In the ensuing years, Hawke and Keating developed an extremely powerful partnership, which proved to be essential to Labor's success in government; multiple Labor figures in years since have cited the partnership between the two as the party's greatest ever. The two men proved a study in contrasts: Hawke was a Rhodes Scholar; Keating left high school early. Hawke's enthusiasms were cigars, betting and most forms of sport; Keating preferred classical architecture, Mahler symphonies and collecting British Regency and French Empire antiques. Despite not knowing one another before Hawke assumed the leadership in 1983, the two formed a personal as well as political relationship which enabled the Government to pursue a significant number of reforms, although there were occasional points of tension between the two.

Keating, along with Hawke, oversaw a "National Economic Summit" in their first month in office, with Keating leading several sessions outlining the Government's economic agenda. The Summit, which brought together a significant number of senior business and industrial figures alongside trade union leaders and politicians, led to a unanimous adoption of a national economic strategy, generating sufficient political capital for the Government to begin a wide-ranging programme of economic reform previously resisted by much of the Labor Party.

=== Macroeconomic reforms ===
ABC News report on the first day of trading with a floating Australian dollar

Keating used the authority and relative autonomy provided to him by Hawke to become one of the major driving forces behind the various extensive macroeconomic reforms of the Government. In December 1983, Hawke and Keating approved the floating of the Australian dollar, disregarding advice from the Treasury Secretary John Stone to retain the fixed currency framework. The success of the move, which was lauded by economic and media commentators, gave confidence to Keating to pursue even more reforms. Over the Hawke government's first and second terms, Keating oversaw the gradual elimination of tariffs on imports, the privatisation of several state-owned companies such as Qantas, CSL Limited, and the Commonwealth Bank, the deregulation of significant sections of the banking system (including allowing for numerous foreign-owned banks to begin operating in Australia for the first time) and the granting of autonomy on decision-making to the Reserve Bank of Australia.

Keating was also instrumental in establishing the Hawke government's signature industrial relations and wages policy, the Prices and Incomes Accord. This was an agreement directly between the Australian Council of Trade Unions (ACTU) and the Government to guarantee a reduction in demands for wage increases, in exchange for the Government providing a significant increase in social programmes, including the introduction of Medicare and the Family Assistance Scheme; in so doing, the Government was able to reduce inflation and unemployment over the decade. Keating's management of the Accord, and the close working relationship he developed with ACTU Secretary Bill Kelty, became a source of significant political power for Keating, who negotiated multiple versions of the Accord with Kelty throughout the Hawke government. Through the power given to him, Keating was often able to bypass the Cabinet altogether, notably in exercising monetary policy, and he was regularly referred to as "the most powerful Treasurer in modern times".

In the wake of the raft of macroeconomic reforms introduced by Keating throughout the first term of the Hawke government in particular, in 1984 he was awarded the Euromoney Finance Minister of the Year, an award which became colloquially known in Australia as the "World's Greatest Treasurer", becoming the first Australian treasurer to be presented with the award.

=== Microeconomic reforms ===
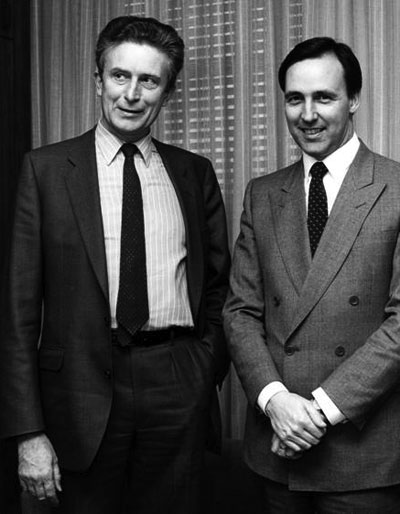
Keating with OECD Secretary-General Jean-Claude Paye, 1985

Throughout the second and third terms of the Hawke government, Keating led a significant overhaul of the long-stagnant Australian taxation system. In 1985, he became a passionate advocate within the Cabinet for the introduction of a broad-based consumption tax, similar in nature to the goods and services tax that was later introduced by the Howard government, as a means of addressing Australia's chronic balance of payments issue. In the build-up to the 1984 election, Hawke promised a policy paper on taxation reform to be discussed with all stakeholders at a "National Taxation Summit". Three options – A, B and C – were presented in the paper, with Keating and his Treasury colleagues fiercely advocating for C, which included a consumption tax of 15% on goods and services along with reductions in personal and company income tax, a fringe benefits tax and a capital gains tax. Although Keating was able to win the support of a reluctant Cabinet, Hawke believed that the opposition from the public, the ACTU, and the business community would be too great. He therefore decided to abandon any plans for a consumption tax, although the remainder of the reforms were adopted in the tax reform package. The loss of the consumption tax was seen a defeat for Keating; he later joked about it at a press conference, saying, "It's a bit like Ben Hur. We've crossed the line with one wheel off, but we have crossed the line."

Whilst the remainder of the package represented the biggest overhaul of the Australian taxation system for decades, Keating continued to agitate for further changes to address the balance of payments problems faced by Australia. On 14 May 1986, frustrated at the slow pace of dealing with the issue, he caused considerable public comment and a degree of controversy when he declared on a radio programme that if Australia did not address the problem, it risked degenerating to the status of a "banana republic". Although the remark was quickly disowned by Hawke in public, the Government increased efforts to deal with the growing balance of payments crisis. With no consumption tax to generate a significant increase in incomings, Keating and his ministerial colleagues led a process to significantly reduce Government outlays instead, resulting in some criticism from the grassroots of the Labor Party, who opposed cuts to spending. Despite the criticism, the Government was able to produce a national budget surplus for the years 1988, 1989 and 1990, with the surplus of 1988 proving to be the largest budget surplus in Australian history.

During the campaign for the 1987 election, Keating was credited as dealing a "fatal" blow to the Liberal-National Coalition's hopes for victory, after giving a press conference in which he exposed a significant accounting error in the costings the Liberal Party had released to demonstrate how its economic policies would be paid for. Then-Opposition Leader John Howard accepted the error, and subsequent opinion polling reported that the mistake greatly contributed to Labor's vote in what proved to be a landslide victory.

Keating's later tenure as treasurer was heavily criticised by some for consistently high interest rates, which he argued was necessary to reduce economic growth gradually so that demand for imports did not grow out of control. Throughout the 1980s, both the global and Australian economies grew quickly, and by the late 1980s, inflation had grown to around 9%. By 1988, the Reserve Bank of Australia began tightening monetary policy, and household interest rates peaked at 18%. It is often said that the bank was too slow in easing monetary policy, and that this ultimately led to a recession. In private, Keating had argued for rates to rise earlier than they did, and fall sooner, although his view was at odds with the Reserve Bank and his Treasury colleagues. Publicly, Hawke and Keating had said there would be no recession – or that there would be a "soft landing" – but this changed when Keating announced the country was indeed in recession in 1990, several months after the Hawke government had won an unprecedented fourth consecutive term in office. Announcing the recession, Keating described it as a "recession Australia had to have". The remark was referred to by political journalist Paul Kelly as "perhaps the most stupid remark of Keating's career, and it nearly cost him the Prime Ministership," though he said that, "...however, it is largely true that the boom begat the recession."

The economic reform package throughout the 1980s has been claimed by numerous economic commentators and journalists to have been the basis for an unprecedentedly long period of economic growth, with Australia's gross domestic product increasing every year for 30 years, and the end of chronic inflation and balance of payments difficulties, along with the increasingly globalised domestic economy, enabling long periods of stability and growth.

=== Leadership challenges ===
At the end of 1988, Keating, who had long believed that he would succeed Hawke as prime minister, began to put pressure on Hawke to retire in the new year. Hawke rejected this advice, but reached a secret agreement with Keating that he would remain as leader through to the 1990 election, and that he would resign in Keating's favour shortly after the election, which he convinced Keating he could win. Hawke subsequently won that election, albeit narrowly, and appointed Keating his deputy prime minister to replace the retiring Lionel Bowen. However, by the end of 1990, frustrated at the lack of any indication from Hawke as to when he might retire, Keating delivered a provocative speech questioning the direction of the government. As a result, Hawke told Keating he would renege on the deal on the basis that Keating had been publicly disloyal.

Although tensions between the two remained private for some time, Keating eventually resigned from the Cabinet in June 1991 and challenged for the leadership. Hawke won the ballot by 66 votes to 44, and in a press statement afterwards Keating declared that he had fired his "one shot" as regards the leadership. Publicly, at least, this seemed to spell the end of his leadership ambitions. Having failed to defeat Hawke, he realised that events would have to move very much in his favour for a second challenge to be even possible, and he strongly considered retiring from politics altogether. However, Hawke's leadership was regarded by many as being "wounded" as a result of losing his long-term political partner and the growing confidence of the Liberal-National Coalition under the new leadership of John Hewson. After Hawke was forced to sack John Kerin, the man appointed to replace Keating as treasurer, for a public gaffe in attempting to combat the Coalition's new 'Fightback!' policy, Keating took the opportunity to challenge a second time in December 1991, this time emerging victorious by 56 votes to 51. He paid tribute to Hawke's nine years as prime minister, and stated that he would provide a robust challenge to Hewson.

== Prime Minister of Australia (1991–1996) ==
On 20 December 1991, Keating was sworn in as prime minister by the Governor-General Bill Hayden. On becoming prime minister, he thought of becoming treasurer again, noting that state premiers had often been their own treasurers, but decided against it. John Dawkins was appointed treasurer instead.

Keating entered office with an extensive legislative agenda, including pursuing reconciliation with Australia's Indigenous population, deepening Australia's economic and cultural ties with Asia, and making Australia a republic. The addressing of these issues came to be known as his "big picture".

=== Indigenous land rights and domestic policy ===
ABC News footage of Keating visiting Indonesia in 1992 and meeting with Indonesian president Suharto

Shortly after Keating became prime minister, the High Court of Australia handed down a judgement in Mabo v Queensland, a long-running case on Indigenous land rights; the judgement would come to be known as Mabo, and declared that a right to native title did exist in Australia, overturning terra nullius, but not clarifying exactly who had the right to access the title. Keating led the Government's response to the ruling, beginning a high-profile public campaign on raising awareness of the issue, and advocating repeatedly in favour of the judgment and for an expansion of Aboriginal and Torres Strait Islander land rights. On 10 December 1992, he delivered a major address which came to be known as the Redfern Park Speech on Aboriginal reconciliation. The speech, in which he explicitly noted the responsibility of settler Australians for destroying much of Indigenous society, has since regularly been cited as among the greatest in Australian political history.

This work culminated in the passage of the Native Title Act in 1993, which "provide(d) a national system for the recognition and protection of native title and for its co-existence with the national land management system". As well as creating the legal field of native title, the act established an Aboriginal and Torres Strait Islander Social Justice Commissioner, who was required to prepare an annual report to the attorney-general on the operation of the Native Title Act and its effect on the exercise and enjoyment of human rights of Aboriginal and Torres Strait Islander peoples, and to report, when requested by the attorney-general, on any other matter relating to the rights of Indigenous people under the act.

Keating delivering the Redfern Park Speech on 10 December 1992

Elsewhere in domestic policy, Keating established and promoted the first Commonwealth cultural policy, known as 'Creative Nation'. The policy allocated AU$250 million over four years to promote the cultural and creative arts sectors in Australia. He had frequently espoused the benefits of the arts in public, and used the policy as an opportunity to develop the Australian cultural sector. During the Keating government, mandatory detention for asylum seekers was also introduced for the first time.

=== Superannuation and economic policy ===
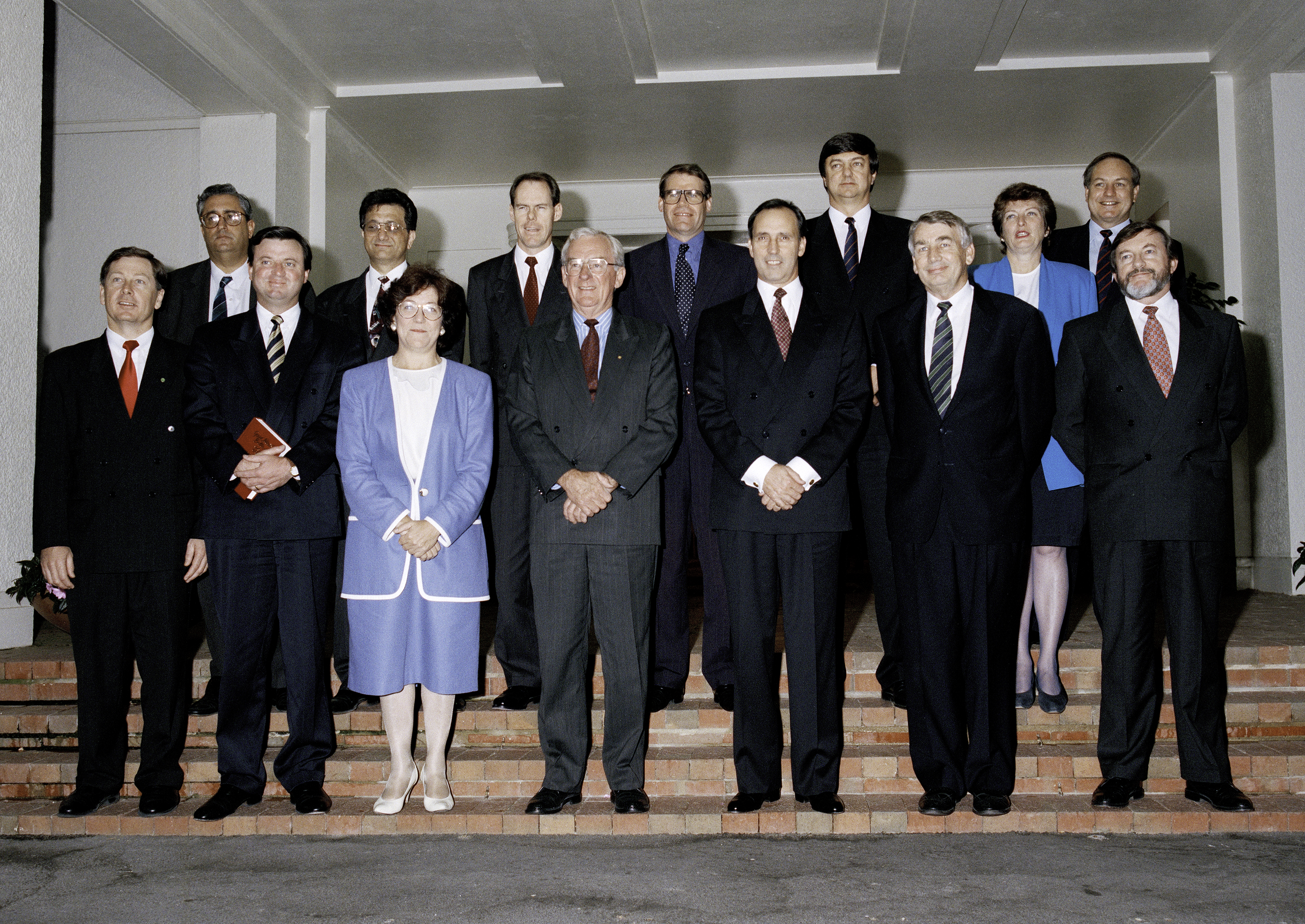
Keating and his Cabinet, 1994

Among Keating's most far-reaching achievements as prime minister was the full introduction of the National Superannuation Scheme, implemented to address Australia's long-term problem of chronically low national savings. This initiative built on policies that Keating had pursued whilst treasurer, and was aimed at ensuring that most Australians would have enough money to retire. In 1992, the compulsory employer contribution scheme became a part of a wider reform package addressing this retirement income dilemma. It had been demonstrated that Australia, along with many other Western nations, would experience a major demographic shift in the coming decades, due to ageing population, and it was claimed that this would result in increased pension payments that would place an unaffordable strain on the Australian economy.

Keating's solution was a "three pillars" approach to retirement income, requiring compulsory employer contributions to superannuation funds, permitting further contributions to superannuation funds and other investments, and introducing, where this was insufficient, a safety net consisting of a means-tested government-funded age pension. The compulsory employer contributions were branded "Superannuation Guarantee" (SG) contributions. As a result of this policy, along with the gradual increases in the minimum contribution amount, Australia grew to become the fourth largest holder of pension fund assets in the world, with a balance of AU$3.3 trillion in superannuation assets at the end of the June 2022 quarter.

In the aftermath of the 1990 recession, Keating appointed his close ally John Dawkins as treasurer, and together the two developed an economic package to counter the Liberal-National Coalition's 'Fightback!' proposals; this package came to be known as 'One Nation', and involved using funding from the budget surplus to produce new welfare-to-work programmes, as well as introducing a new degree of competition within the telecommunications and communications industries and creating the Australian National Training Authority (ANTA). 'One Nation' also proposed a series of further tax cuts for middle-income workers coming in two tranches, in 1993 and 1995, although these would later be deferred to 1995 and 1998, a move which cost the Government considerable political support among the public. A further major economic policy development was the introduction of an enterprise bargaining scheme as part of the final stage of the Prices and Incomes Accord, intended to allow for greater flexibility and economies of scale within industrial wage arbitration, although much of this was curtailed by the Howard government after 1996.

=== Foreign policy ===
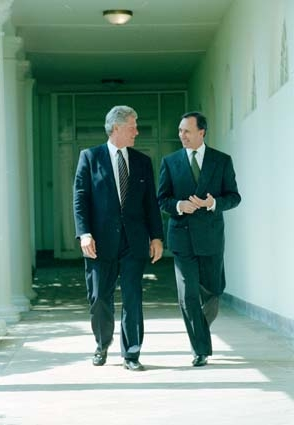
Keating with U.S. President Bill Clinton (left) in 1993

Throughout his time as prime minister, Keating took a number of steps to strengthen and develop bilateral links with Australia's closest neighbours; he frequently said that there was no country in the world that was more important to Australia than Indonesia, and undertook his first overseas visit to the country, becoming the first Australian prime minister to do so. Keating made a conscious effort to develop a personal relationship with Indonesian President Suharto, and to include Indonesia in multilateral forums attended by Australia. Keating's friendship with Suharto was criticised by human rights activists supportive of East Timorese independence, and by Nobel Peace Prize winner José Ramos-Horta. The Keating government's cooperation with the Indonesian military, and the signing of the Timor Gap Treaty, were also strongly criticised by these same groups. It was alleged by some that Keating was overlooking alleged human rights abuses by the Indonesian government as part of his effort to dramatically increase Australia's cultural, diplomatic and economic ties with Asia.

Following the creation of the Asia-Pacific Economic Cooperation (APEC) Economic Forum by Bob Hawke, Keating developed the idea further, winning the support in 1993 of recently elected US President Bill Clinton and Chinese Premier Li Peng to expand APEC to a full Leaders' Meeting. This led to APEC becoming one of the most significant high-level international summits, and at the 1994 APEC Leaders' Meeting, hosted by Indonesia, members agreed to the Keating government's proposals for what became known as the Bogor Declaration, which set targets for a significant increase in free trade and investment between industrialised APEC countries by 2010 and between developing APEC countries by 2020. In December 1993, Keating became involved in a diplomatic incident with Malaysia when he described Prime Minister Mahathir Mohamad as "recalcitrant". The incident occurred after Mahathir refused to attend the 1993 APEC summit. Keating said "APEC is bigger than all of us – Australia, the U.S. and Malaysia, and Dr. Mahathir and any other recalcitrants." The translation of the word "recalcitrant" into Malaysian rendered the word a more egregious insult, and Mahathir demanded an apology from Keating, threatening to reduce diplomatic ties and trade drastically with Australia, which became an enormous concern to Australian exporters. Some Malaysian officials talked of launching a "Buy Australian Last" campaign; Keating subsequently apologised to Mahathir over the remark.

=== 1993 and 1996 elections ===
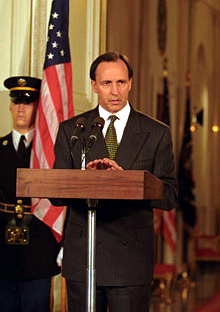
Keating at the White House in 1993

As prime minister, Keating maintained his aggressive debating style. When asked by Opposition Leader John Hewson why he would not call an early election, Keating replied, "because I want to do you slowly". He referred to the Liberal Party as "a motley, dishonest crew", and the National Party as "dummies and dimwits; desperadoes". During an opposition debate that sought to censure Keating, he described being attacked by Peter Costello as "like being flogged with warm lettuce". Despite this renewed attack on the Opposition, and a busy legislative agenda, many commentators predicted that the 1993 election was "unwinnable" for Labor.

During the campaign, Keating focused a great amount of effort on attacking the Coalition's proposed goods and services tax (GST), arguing that it would prove "a dead weight" on the economy, and stating that "every time you put your hand in your pocket, Dr. Hewson's will be in there with you". He was helped by Hewson struggling towards the end of the campaign to explain exactly which products would have the GST levied on them, and which would not. Having begun the campaign far behind the Coalition in opinion polls, on 13 March Keating led Labor to an unexpected and record-breaking fifth consecutive election victory, picking up a two-seat swing. The speech Keating delivered at the victory celebration has been described as one of the great Labor speeches. Opening with "This is a victory for the true believers; the men and women of Australia who, in difficult times, have kept the faith", the speech has been described as providing a source of inspiration for Labor Party faithful to the present day.

Like Hawke before him, Keating was able to benefit from disunity in the Liberal Party. Fourteen months after the March 1993 election, John Hewson was replaced as Liberal Leader by Alexander Downer, whose leadership was quickly marred by gaffes and controversies within months. Keating routinely succeeded in outwitting Downer within Parliament, and in early 1995, Downer resigned to be replaced by John Howard, who had previously led the Liberals from 1985 to 1989. Howard was able to give the Coalition renewed momentum after Labor lost the seat of Canberra in a by-election. In contrast to Hewson, Howard adopted a "small target" campaign strategy for the 1996 election, publicly committing to keep numerous Labor reforms such as Medicare, and defusing the republic issue by promising to hold a constitutional convention. This combined with a narrative of "time for a change" led to a heavy defeat for the Keating government on 2 March 1996, suffering a five percent two party preferred swing and losing 29 seats, making it the second-worst defeat of a sitting government in Australian history. Keating announced he would retire as Labor Leader and from Parliament, and tendered his resignation as prime minister on 11 March, 13 years to the day after Bob Hawke had first taken office.

== Post-political career ==
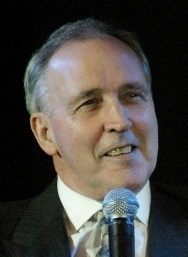
Keating in 2007

After leaving Parliament in 1996, Keating moved to the affluent eastern Sydney suburb of Woollahra. He accepted appointment as a director for various companies, and also became a senior adviser to Lazard, an investment banking firm. Keating was appointed to the advisory council to the Chinese Government Development Bank. He was also appointed a visiting professor of public policy at the University of New South Wales and was awarded honorary doctorates in law from Keio University in Tokyo (1995), the National University of Singapore (1999), the University of New South Wales (2003) and Macquarie University (2012). In 1997, Keating declined appointment in the Australia Day Honours as a Companion of the Order of Australia, an honour which has been offered to all former prime ministers since the modern Australian Honours System was introduced in 1975. On his refusal, Keating expressed that he had long believed honours should be reserved for those whose work in the community went unrecognised and that having been prime minister was sufficient public recognition.

In 2000, Keating published his first book since leaving office, Engagement: Australia Faces the Asia-Pacific, which focused on foreign policy during his time as prime minister. In 2002, Keating's former speechwriter and adviser, Don Watson, published Recollections of a Bleeding Heart: A Portrait of Paul Keating PM. The book first drew criticism from Keating's by then-estranged wife, Annita Keating, who said that it understated her contribution, a complaint Watson rejected. Keating himself was so unhappy with the book that it brought the two men's friendship to an abrupt end.

Keating initially avoided public political comment during the Howard government, although made occasional speeches criticising his successor's social policies. Ahead of the 2007 election, Keating joined former Labor Prime Ministers Gough Whitlam and Bob Hawke to campaign against Howard, describing Howard as a "desiccated coconut" who was "Araldited to the seat", as an "...old antediluvian 19th century person who wanted to stomp forever...on ordinary people's rights to organise themselves at work...he's a pre-Copernican obscurantist". He also described Howard's deputy, Peter Costello, as being "all tip and no iceberg" when referring to an alleged pact made by Howard to hand the leadership over to Costello after two terms.

In February 2008, after Labor's victory in the 2007 election, Keating joined former prime ministers Whitlam, Fraser and Hawke in Parliament House to witness new prime minister Kevin Rudd deliver the National Apology to the Stolen Generations. In August 2008, he spoke at the book launch of Unfinished Business: Paul Keating's Interrupted Revolution, authored by economist David Love. Among the topics discussed during the launch were the need to increase compulsory superannuation contributions, as well as to restore incentives for people to receive their superannuation payments in annuities.

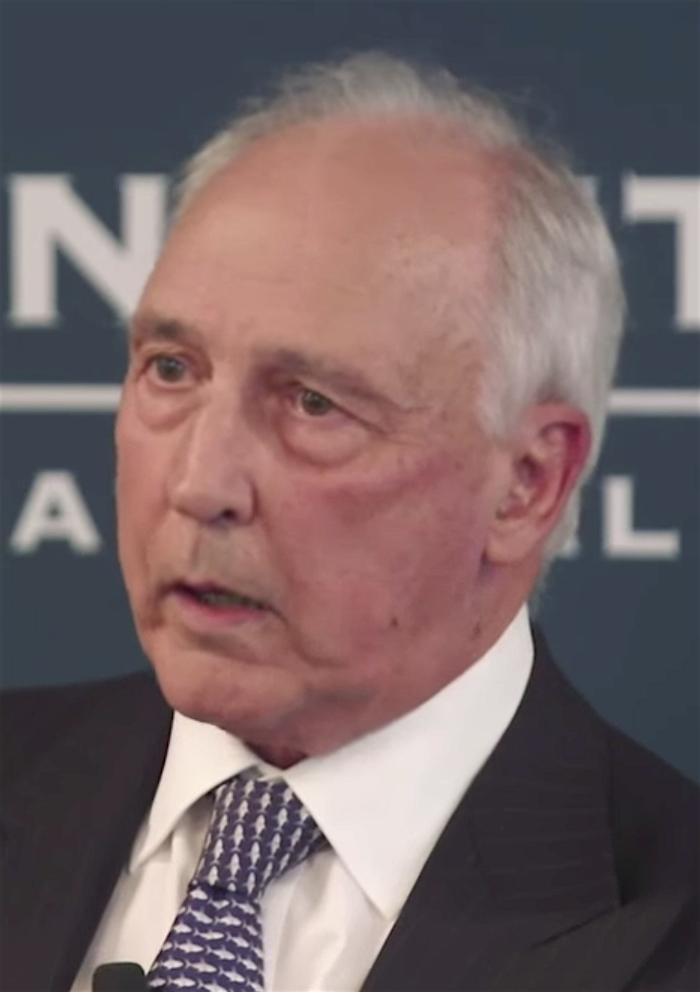
Keating in 2017

In 2013, Keating took part in a series of four-hour-long interviews with Kerry O'Brien which were broadcast on the ABC in November of that year. The series covered Keating's early life, his entry into Parliament, his years as treasurer and prime minister, and canvassing his academic, musical and artistic interests, economic and cultural vision for Australia, and commitment to Australia's integration into Asia. O'Brien used these conversations as the basis for a 2014 book Keating: The Interviews. Keating repeatedly declared he would not write a memoir, so his cooperation with O'Brien was perceived as the closest he would come to producing an autobiography.

In 2016, Troy Bramston, a journalist for The Australian and a political historian, wrote an unauthorised biography that Keating cooperated with titled Paul Keating: The Big-Picture Leader. Bramston was given full access to Keating's personal papers, was granted a series of interviews with Keating and also interviewed more than 100 other people. It was described as the "authoritative" and "definitive" Keating biography written by a "first class" political historian.

During the 2015 New South Wales state election, Keating gave his support for the privatisation agenda of the Liberal government and slammed the Labor Party for its anti-privatisation position.

In 2019, during campaigning for that year's federal election, Keating spoke out against the Australian Security Intelligence Organisation by calling them "nutters". His remarks attracted media criticism, and Labor leader Bill Shorten distanced himself from Keating's views. Keating later issued a joint statement with Bob Hawke endorsing Labor's economic plan as part of the election campaign, and condemning the Liberal Party for "completely [giving] up the economic reform agenda". They stated that "Shorten's Labor is the only party of government focused on the need to modernise the economy to deal with the major challenge of our time: human induced climate change"; it was the first joint press statement released by the two since 1991. After Hawke's death in the same month, Keating gave an address at Hawke's state memorial service at Sydney Opera House on 14 June, where he reflected on the "great friendship and partnership" the two had enjoyed.

In September 2021, following the announcement of the AUKUS trilateral military alliance between the United States, United Kingdom and Australia, Keating criticised the alliance, saying that "Australia turns its back on the 21st century, the century of Asia, for the jaded and faded Anglosphere" and the deal would be "locking the country and its military forces into the force structure of the United States by acquiring US submarines". Keating went on to criticise Labor's opposition foreign affairs spokesperson Penny Wong, accusing the Labor opposition of being complicit with the Liberal government in "false representation of China's foreign policy". His comments were criticised by Labor MPs Anthony Byrne and Peter Khalil.

In January 2022, Keating accused British foreign secretary Liz Truss of making "demented" comments about Chinese military aggression in the Pacific, saying that "Britain suffers delusions of grandeur and relevance deprivation." In 2023, Keating went on to call the AUKUS pact "the worst deal in all history" and lambasting the Labor government for being "incompetent" and stating that the decision was the worst by a Labor government since Billy Hughes attempted to introduce conscription during World War I.

In 2024, Keating again criticized AUKUS, claiming that Taiwan is "Chinese real estate" and is comparable to Tasmania. In response, Taiwan's foreign ministry rejected the former prime minister's comment, saying that his description of Taiwan would not affect the nation's independent status. In December 2024, Keating sold his shareholding in Boost Mobile for $40 million, having co-founded the business in 2000 with an investment of $500,000.

== Personal life ==
In 1972, Keating announced his engagement to fashion consultant Kristine Kennedy, but they did not marry.

On 17 January 1975, Keating married Annita van Iersel, a Dutch-born flight attendant for Alitalia. They had four children, who spent some of their teenage years in The Lodge, the prime minister's official residence in Canberra. The couple separated in November 1998. While they did not formally divorce until 2008, Annita had resumed her maiden name long before then.

In the early 1970s, Keating moved from the family home in Bankstown when he purchased a new brick-veneer house at 12 Gerard Avenue, Condell Park, two doors up from his parents' new home at No. 8 Gerard Avenue. This became the family home after his marriage in 1975 until 1983, when the Keatings sold the property for $123,000 and moved to a one-storey rental house in the Canberra suburb of Red Hill, to be closer to work.

Since 1999 and as of 2013, Keating's partner was the actress Julieanne Newbould.

Keating is a Catholic, having been raised in a Catholic family and has been described as a "conventional Christian". Catholic social teaching and egalitarianism featured in many of his political views, including his support for an Australian republic.

Keating's interests include the music of Gustav Mahler and collecting French antique clocks. He currently resides in Potts Point, in inner-city Sydney, and has a holiday home on the Hawkesbury River.

Keating was formerly the patron of the Canterbury-Bankstown Bulldogs in the National Rugby League.

Keating's daughter, Katherine Keating, is a former adviser to former New South Wales Minister Craig Knowles as well as former New South Wales Premier Bob Carr. In 2019 and 2026, she attracted press attention over her friendship with Ghislaine Maxwell, former partner of American financier and child sex offender Jeffrey Epstein.

== Popular culture ==
In 2005, Keating!, a musical based on Keating's life and career, premiered at the Melbourne International Comedy Festival. It went on to run until 2010, winning a number of awards and being broadcast on ABC2.

Jonathan Biggins has portrayed Keating in the Sydney Theatre Company's Wharf Revues, the TV series At Home with Julia and the stage plays The Gospel According to Paul and The Gospel According to Paul: The Second Coming.

Felix Williamson portrayed a somewhat villainous Keating in the 2010 television film Hawke.

Glenn Butcher parodied Keating in the sketch comedy TV series Full Frontal.

== See also ==
- First Keating Ministry
- Second Keating Ministry

Parliament of Australia
Preceded by Eli Harrison	Member for Blaxland; 1969–1996	Succeeded by Michael Hatton
Political offices
Preceded by Rex Patterson	Minister for Northern Australia; 1975	Succeeded by Ian Sinclair
Preceded by John Howard	Treasurer of Australia; 1983–1991	Succeeded by John Kerin
Preceded by Lionel Bowen	Deputy Prime Minister of Australia; 1990–1991	Succeeded by Brian Howe
Preceded by Bob Hawke	Prime Minister of Australia; 1991–1996	Succeeded by John Howard
Party political offices
Preceded by John Ducker	President of the New South Wales Labor Party; 1979–1983	Succeeded by John MacBean
Preceded by Lionel Bowen	Deputy Leader of the Labor Party; 1990–1991	Succeeded by Brian Howe
Preceded by Bob Hawke	Leader of the Labor Party; 1991–1996	Succeeded by Kim Beazley
