= June 1991 Australian Labor Party leadership spill =

Ballots to select the new party leader

June 1991 Australian Labor Party Leadership spill
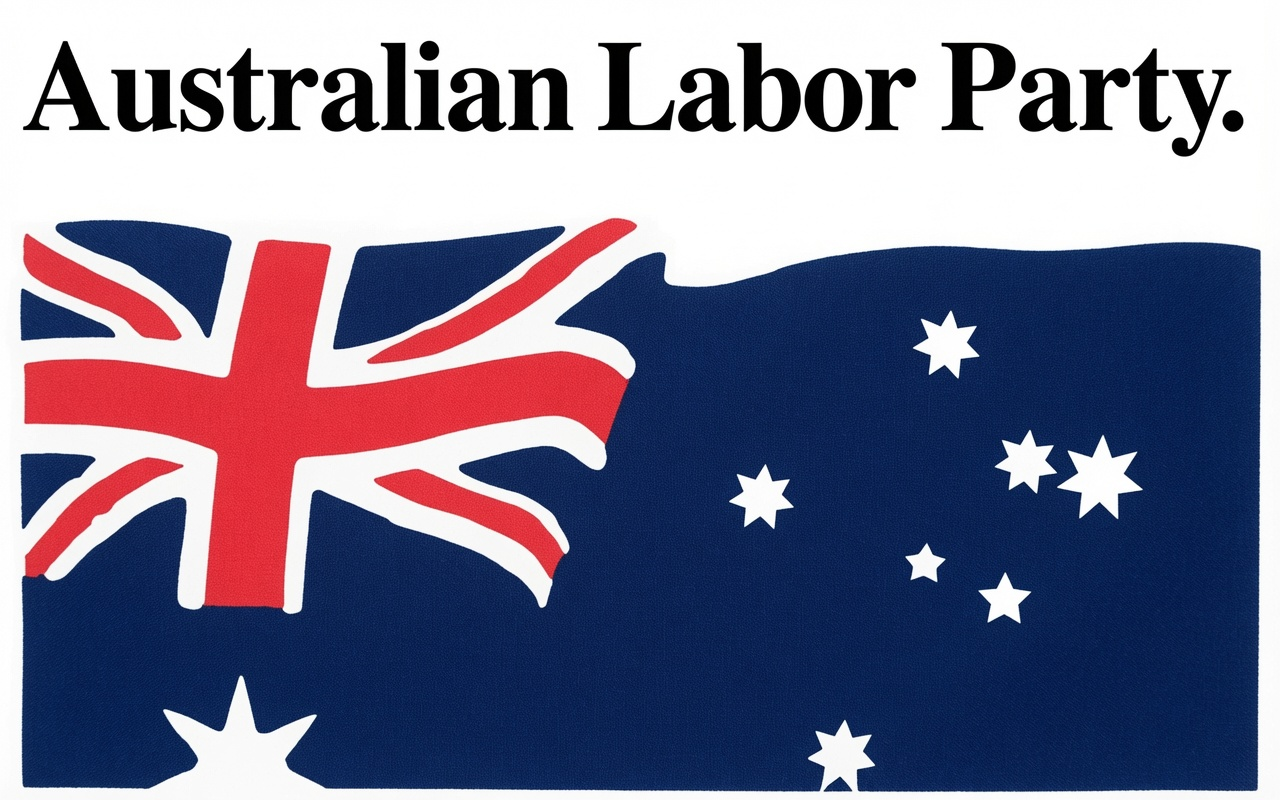
- 3 June 1991
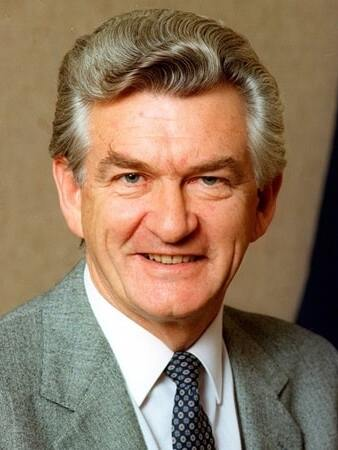

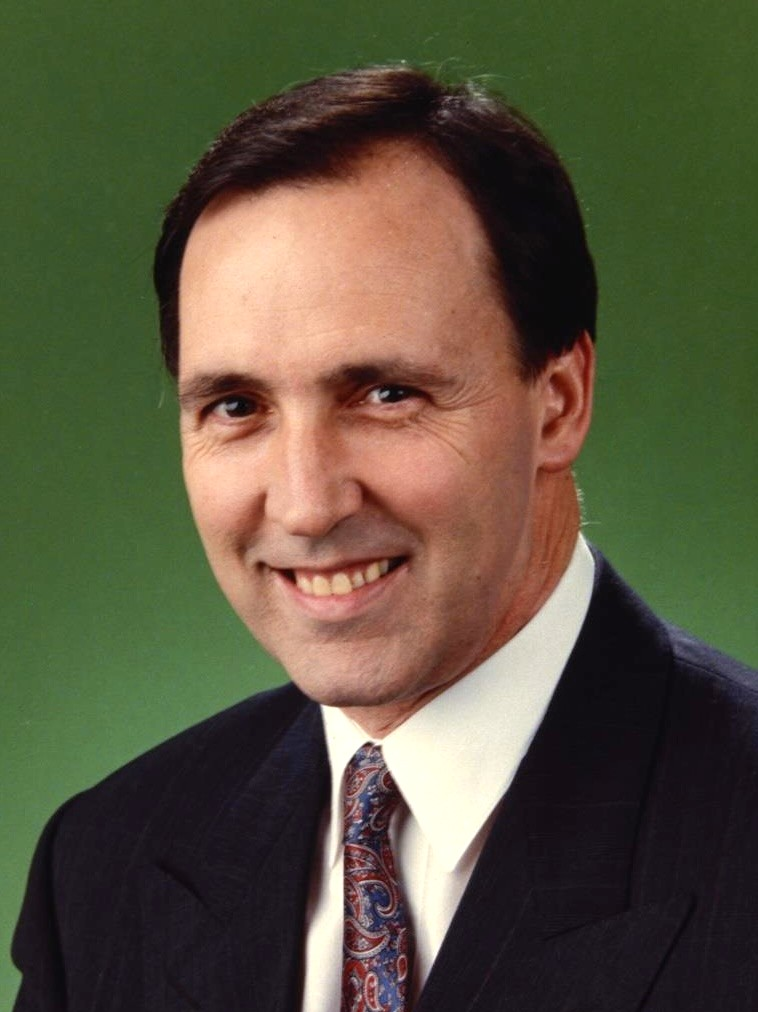
Candidate	Bob Hawke	Paul Keating
Caucus vote	66 (60.0%)	44 (40.0%)
Leader before election
Bob Hawke
Elected Leader
Bob Hawke

A leadership spill in the Australian Labor Party, the party of government in the Parliament of Australia, was held on 3 June 1991. It was the first of two ballots that year with Prime Minister Bob Hawke surviving the ballot against Treasurer Paul Keating, who then went to the backbench.

== Background ==
Bob Hawke had been leader of the Labor Party since 3 February 1983, and prime minister since the 1983 election, with Labor winning a record four elections under his leadership. However, the unexpectedly close win at the 1990 election, coupled with the deepening economic recession, fuelled tensions within the government over economic policy.

Furthermore, a re-energised Liberal opposition led by John Hewson, a qualified economist, gained ground in the opinion polls. Hawke had alienated key NSW Right faction powerbroker, Senator Graham Richardson by late 1990, with the latter bluntly telling Hawke he no longer had the support of the Right.

Deputy Prime Minister and Treasurer Paul Keating launched his first June challenge against Hawke after the latter apparently reneged on a Kirribilli agreement that he would hand over the leadership in 1990.

== Candidates ==
- Bob Hawke, incumbent leader, Prime Minister of Australia, member for Wills
- Paul Keating, former deputy prime minister, former treasurer, member for Blaxland

== Results ==
Australian Labor Party Deputy Leadership spill, 1991
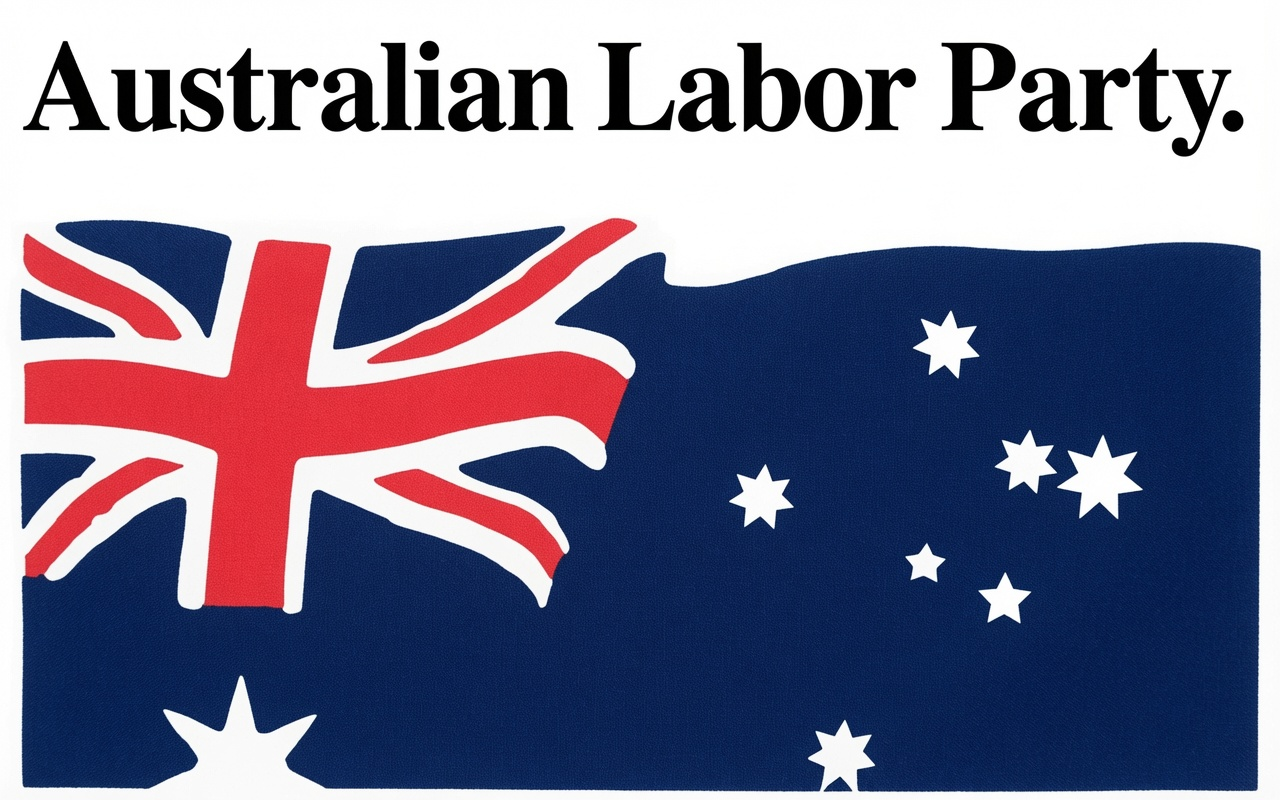

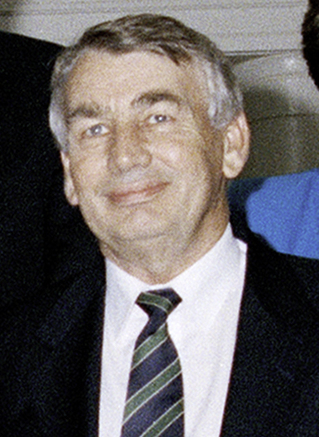
Candidate	Brian Howe	Graeme Campbell
Caucus vote	81 (73.6%)	18 (16.4%)
Deputy Leader before election
Paul Keating
Deputy Leader
after election
Brian Howe

The following tables gives the ballot results:

=== Leadership ballot ===
Name	Votes	Percentage
Bob Hawke	66	60.0
Paul Keating	44	40.0

=== Deputy leadership ballot ===
Candidate	Final ballot	%
Brian Howe	81	73.6
Graeme Campbell	18	16.4
Abstentions	11	10.0

== Aftermath ==
Hawke's public support continued to decline before in December 1991, he called on another spill which Keating won 56–51.

== See also ==
- December 1991 Australian Labor Party leadership spill
