= Gross operating surplus =

In the national accounts, gross operating surplus (GOS) is the portion of income derived from production by incorporated enterprises that are earned by the capital factor. It is calculated as a balancing item in the generation of income account of the national accounts.

It differs from profits shown in company accounts for several reasons. Only a subset of total costs is subtracted from gross output to calculate the GOS. Essentially GOS is gross output less the cost of intermediate goods and services (to give gross value added) and less compensation of employees. It is gross because it makes no allowance for the depreciation of capital.

A similar concept for unincorporated enterprises (e.g. small family businesses like farms and retail shops or self-employed taxi drivers, lawyers and health professionals) is gross mixed-income. Since in most such cases it is difficult to distinguish between income from labour and income from capital, the balancing item in the generation of income account is "mixed" by including both, the remuneration of the capital and labour (of the family members and self-employed) used in production.

Gross operating surplus and gross mixed income are used to calculate GDP using the income method.

== Data ==
- Gross operating surplus and gross mixed income in Europe
