= Fightback! (policy) =

1993 Liberal Party of Australia document

Fightback! was a 650-page economic policy package document proposed by John Hewson, federal leader of the Liberal Party of Australia and Leader of the Opposition from 1990 to 1994. It represented the start of their new economic liberal future policy direction, very different from the Keynesianism they previously practised. The package was part of their unsuccessful policy platform at the 1993 election.

== Key elements ==
The key elements of Fightback! were:

- Changes to industrial relations, including the abolition of awards and the elimination of automatic entitlements to unemployment benefits after nine months;
- Changes to Medicare, including the "abolition of bulk billing except for veterans, war widows, pensioners, health card holders and the disabled" and the "provision of gap insurance for medical bills".
- The introduction of a goods and services tax (GST) at a 15% rate;
- A $13 billion personal income tax cut, directed largely at the middle and upper-middle income earners;
- A $10 billion cut in government expenditure partially offset by increasing other areas, including $3.6 billion in selected government programs on social welfare;
- The abolition of State payroll taxes and substantial cuts in petrol excise duty and proposed schemes for savings;
- The sale of a number of government-owned businesses.
- The elimination of Tariffs.

== Response ==
The fifteen percent GST was the centrepiece of the policy document. Through 1992, Labor Prime Minister Paul Keating mounted a campaign against the Fightback! package, and particularly against the GST, which he described as an attack on the working class in that it shifted the tax burden from direct taxation of the wealthy to indirect taxation as a broad-based consumption tax.

After a negative reception to the Fightback! policies, Hewson reconsidered Fightback! and relaunched it in December 1992. The major changes were to remove the goods and services tax on food and child care through zero rating and provision for a Rebuild Australia fund for new public works. Changes to Medicare, the $10 billion cut in government expenditure and Jobsback package of labour market reforms remained unchanged.

Hewson's difficulty in explaining to the electorate what food would and wouldn't have the GST applied was exemplified in the infamous birthday cake interview, considered by some as a turning point in the election campaign.

== Legacy ==
Keating won the 1993 federal election, marking a fifth consecutive Labor term. In April 1994, Hewson declared the Fightback! policy to be 'Dead and Buried'. Despite this declaration, Liberal frontbencher Peter Reith said that elements of Fightback! could still be used. As Deputy Liberal Leader and Shadow Treasurer between 1990 and 1993, Reith was the co-architect of Fightback! with Hewson. Hewson, viewing this as a defiance of his authority in declaring Fightback! dead and buried, threatened Reith with a sack from the frontbench if he did not toe the line on the Coalition's official position on Fightback!.

One month later, in May 1994, Alexander Downer replaced Hewson as Leader of the Liberal Party. Hewson resigned from Parliament in 1995.

A number of the proposals were later adopted in to law in some form, to a small extent during the Keating Labor government, and to a larger extent during the Howard Liberal government (most famously the GST, although different to Hewson's version), while unemployment benefits and bulk billing were re-targeted for a time by the Abbott Liberal government. Tony Abbott as press secretary to Liberal Leader John Hewson from 1990 to 1993, helped to develop the Fightback! policy.

The industrial relations element of Fightback! has been viewed as an early version of WorkChoices implemented by the Howard government and John Howard was the Shadow Industrial Relations Minister prior to the 1993 election.

Peter Hendy who worked for Hewson's deputy, Shadow treasurer Peter Reith, stated on ABC TV that three people knew the GST policy thoroughly, Reith, Hendy and another Reith staffer. Hendy also stated Hewson was not among those three that knew the policy thoroughly and also that due to being overloaded with letters from the Australian public asking questions about the GST and Fightback!, policy had to be made on the run in Hendy's mind. The birthday cake interview was an example of this. Hewson stated in response, that had Hendy and the staff done their job, no policy would have needed to be made on the run.

== See also ==
- Early 1990s recession in Australia
