= Death of Caroline Byrne =

1995 unsolved death

- Date: 7 June 1995 (aged 24)
- Location: The Gap, Sydney, Australia; 33.843803°S 151.284998°E
- Cause: Death by falling
- Deaths: Caroline Byrne
- Coroner: John Abernethy
- Suspects: Gordon Wood
- Charges: Murder
- Verdict: Guilty, overturned on appeal

Caroline Byrne (8 October 1970 – 7 June 1995), an Australian model, was found at the bottom of a cliff at The Gap in Sydney in the early hours of 8 June 1995. Her then boyfriend Gordon Eric Wood (b. 1962), who at the time of her death was a chauffeur and personal assistant to businessman Rene Rivkin, was convicted of her murder on 21 November 2008 and spent three years in Goulburn Correctional Centre. He was acquitted of the conviction in February 2012.

== Events of 7 June 1995 ==
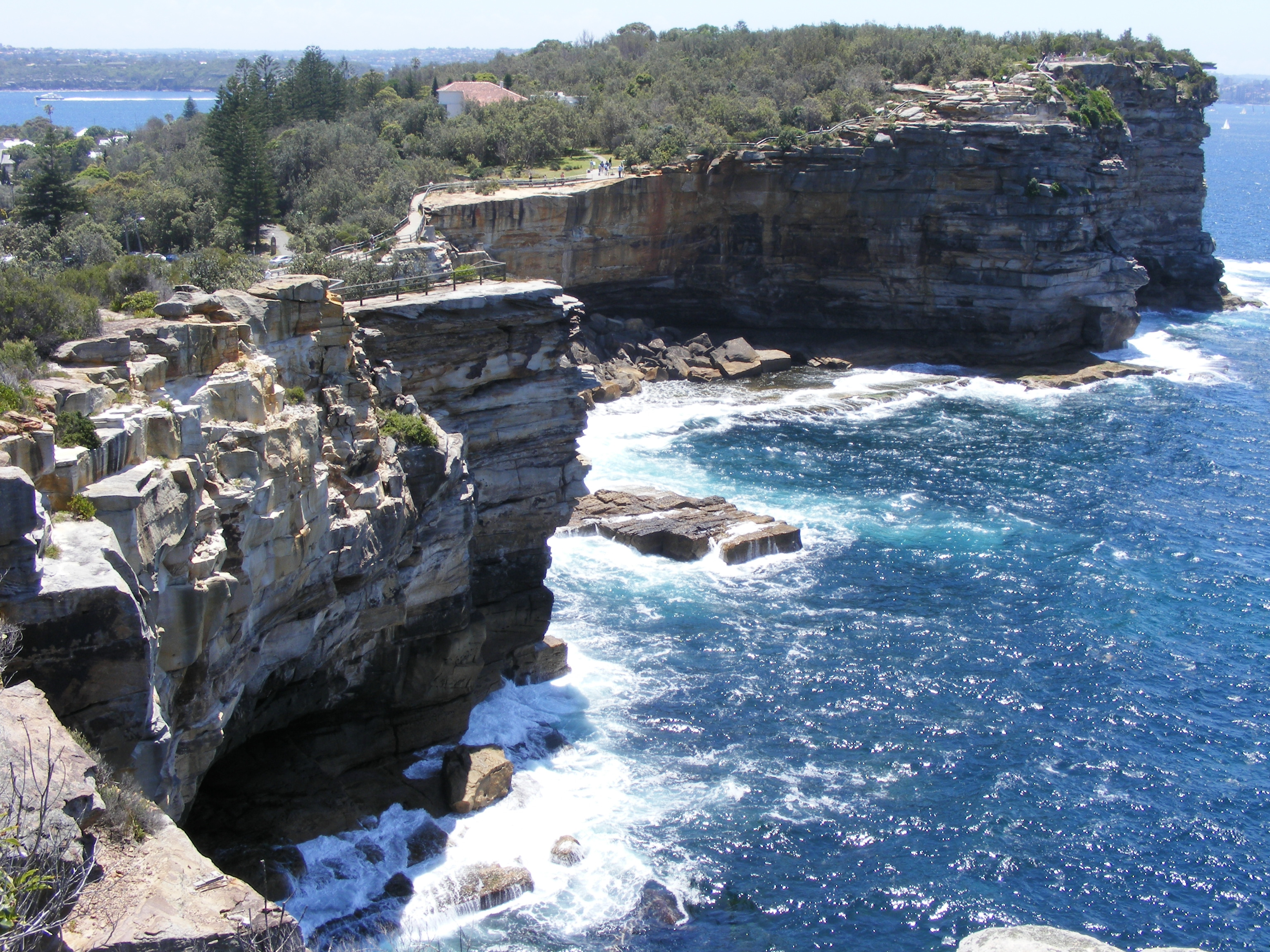
The Gap at Watsons Bay, location of Byrne's death.

Born on 8 October 1970, Byrne had been in a relationship with Wood since 1992. She was a model but principally worked as a modelling instructor for Sydney deportment and etiquette educator June Dally-Watkins. On 7 June 1995, she failed to turn up for work and for an appointment with a psychiatrist. There were three claimed sightings of her near The Gap at Watsons Bay that afternoon and evening, in the company of two men, one of whom matched Wood's description. Two of the sightings, at 1:00 p.m. and 3:00 p.m., were by local cafe owners Craig Martin and Lance Melbourne. In 1998, John Doherty, an Irish artist who had been out of the country in the intervening years, came forward to say that around 8:30 p.m. that evening he too had seen Byrne outside his studio window arguing with one man while another man stood nearby.

Wood denied being present at Watsons Bay that afternoon. Evidence was sworn at both inquests by Wood's friends Brett Cochrane and Nic Samartis that they lunched with him briefly around 1:15 p.m. in Potts Point before he was called away after a call from Rivkin. Wood claimed that he was asked by Rivkin to chauffeur prominent lobbyist and ex-federal minister Graham Richardson to an appointment and then spent the afternoon doing regular chores for Rivkin before going home around 7:00 p.m. The Richardson alibi was compromised by Richardson when he was interviewed by police in 2001, when he advised that he had lunched that day with rugby league administrator Peter Moore.

Wood's movements in the afternoon have never been reported prior to the late evening, when Wood said he awoke on his couch having fallen asleep in front of the television and was immediately alarmed that Byrne was still not home. Wood has said he did not know Byrne's whereabouts but was led by what he termed "telepathic communication" to The Gap. He had first driven to the beachfront car-park at Bondi Beach where he and Byrne had spent much time and then to a favourite park at Camp Cove where they had often picnicked. Heading back from Camp Cove he spotted Byrne's white Suzuki Vitara parked in a lane at The Gap. It was when running about the cliff-top and shouting her name that Wood encountered two rock fishermen who verified his appearance around midnight.

Wood then rang Caroline's father, Tony Byrne, and brother Peter Byrne. He then drove back into Sydney and collected them and all three then went to the Gap and scoured the cliff-top. Peter Byrne later gave evidence that at about 1:00 a.m. Wood claimed to have spotted her body at the base of the cliff using torchlight. Byrne himself said he could see nothing and nor could the police who arrived soon after with police torches. The night was dark and the cliff misty. Peter Byrne claimed it was difficult to see the rocks below the cliff, let alone a body. The contention whether Wood had claimed he could see something in the darkness figured in much media speculation over the years and formed a key part of Crown evidence in the 2008 trial. In 2011, the Appeal Court felt that the Crown had presented speculation in this area posing as evidence. This was one of the grounds resulting in Wood's 2011 appeal being upheld.

The identity of the second man supposedly sighted by Melbourne and Martin with Wood in Watsons Bay earlier in the day has remained unclear. With evidence contradicting the likelihood that the man was either of those whom the police considered in investigation (Byrne's modelling agent Adam Leigh or Rivkin associate Gary Redding) the Crown chose to pose speculation without evidence on either during the trial and drew criticism from the trial judge and later the appellant judges.

== Media interest ==
Byrne's death was accepted as a suicide by local Rose Bay Police and others. No photographs were taken of the location of her body's landing point.

In 1996, Byrne's father began to agitate against the notion of suicide such that from 1997 onwards the case and circumstances of Byrne's death were regularly examined in Australia's national newspapers and reported as "one of Sydney's unsolved crimes". The death of a beautiful model at one of Sydney's notorious suicide spots, the connection to the flamboyant and newsworthy Rivkin, and a net of witnesses and commentators which included some prominent Sydney identities all added to the intrigue of the case.

=== Offset Alpine speculation ===
Attention was particularly heightened by the still unproven speculation of a connection with Rivkin's financial activities. The day before Byrne's death, Wood and Rivkin were interviewed by the Australian Securities & Investments Commission (ASIC) about the Offset Alpine fire of 1993 and the true ownership of share parcels traded in Offset Alpine owned by nominees related to Swiss bank accounts. Tony Byrne claimed that Wood had indicated to his daughter that the fire was a set-up for insurance purposes.

Ultimately in 2001 Rivkin was charged with insider trading (of Qantas shares) and his eventual conviction in 2003 had a devastating effect on his mental stability, culminating in his 2005 suicide. However the ASIC investigation into share trading in Offset Alpine and the true beneficiaries proved an epic that outlived Rivkin, commencing in 1995 and continuing from 2005 with a focus shifted to Graham Richardson and Trevor Kennedy until eventually closed without outcome by ASIC in 2010.

=== Peripheral celebrities ===
Adding to this intrigue was a list of celebrities with a peripheral involvement in the case. Annabelle Lowe and Milla Egerton's medical doctor who had referred her to the psychiatric appointment she did not keep on 7 June was television celebrity physician, Dr Cindy Pan. Graham Richardson's diarised luncheon appointment that day (which caused him to question whether he may have been chauffeured anywhere by Wood) was with rugby league identity Peter "Bullfrog" Moore at Sydney's Hilton Hotel and was set up to broker a peace deal in the Super League war which deeply divided Australian rugby league at that time. Wood always claimed that he had driven Moore from a noon meeting with Rivkin to what may well have been a lunch, though the press and (later) the Crown ignored this possibility. Moore died in July 2000 a year prior to the Strikeforce Irondale interview with Richardson, thus preventing corroboration of the luncheon timings and Rivkin too was dead before the trial.

Byrne's close friends included entertainer Tania Zaetta and actress Kylie Watson, a Home & Away cast member. It was the amateur sleuthing around Watsons Bay armed with photographs of Byrne in the weeks after her death which had Dally-Watkins and Watson uncover the Martin/Melbourne sighting lead. Other celebrity witnesses who figured in the case at some point included businessman John Singleton, journalist Paul Barry and paparazzo Jamie Fawcett.

== Inquests, investigation and trials ==
Two inquests were held into Byrne's death by New South Wales State coroner John Abernethy, with Wood claiming it was suicide. The second inquest in 1998 delivered an open finding. That same year, Wood left Australia.

Police investigations continued from 2000 onwards as "Strikeforce Irondale" with hundreds of witnesses interviewed and resulting in a brief of evidence running to more than 350 pages. Tony Byrne continued to press for action from the investigation eventually enrolling the assistance of New South Wales politician Fred Nile who raised questions about the investigation in State Parliament up till 2004.

In 2004, scientific reports relating to the physics of a body falling/jumping/being projected from the cliff produced by Professor Rod Cross were the principal elements of new evidence which encouraged the Crown to push for a trial of Gordon Wood. In March 2006, the New South Wales Director of Public Prosecutions Nicholas Cowdery QC agreed with police that there was enough evidence to charge Wood with Byrne's murder. Wood was detained in London in April 2006, extradited to Australia and released on bail by a Sydney court on 4 May. On 6 July 2007, Wood was committed to stand trial for the murder of Byrne.

The first trial started on 21 July 2008 with Mark Tedeschi QC appearing for the Crown and Winston Terracini QC defending Wood. On 6 August 2008, Justice Graham Barr declared a mistrial because of the alleged contact that a member of the jury had with 2GB radio host Jason Morrison. The juror, who remained anonymous, claimed that some of the jurors were planning a secret night visit to the crime scene (the Gap) being organised by a particular juror who was a "bully" and who had "already decided that Wood was guilty." Barr ruled "I had to discharge the jury ... because some jurors disobeyed my instructions and misconducted themselves."

The second trial commenced on 25 August 2008 and for the first time in New South Wales court history a panel of 15 jurors was sworn in instead of the usual 12 to provide some contingency.

== Trial evidence ==
=== Presentation of the Crown case ===
Following the aborted first trial, Tedeschi, as Crown Prosecutor, presented the Crown case over a nine-week period from 26 August until 24 October 2008. Over 70 witnesses were called and the jury heard hours of audio and video evidence including taped interviews with Rivkin and Wood.

Witnesses called by the prosecution included Pan, Richardson, Watson, Zaetta, Singleton, Fawcett, Bob Hagan and sports journalist Phil Rothfield. Tony Byrne, Peter Byrne, Dally-Watkins and her daughter Carol Clifford appeared. Doherty and Cochrane gave evidence via video link up from overseas. Police witnesses included Tracey Smit and Paul Griffiths (officers on scene), Sgt Mark Powderly, Sgt Neville Greatorex (who gave evidence on police procedures), Snr Const Lisa Camwell (who retrieved the body) and the first investigating officer of the case Sgt Craig Woods of Rose Bay who had first dismissed the death as suicide and who gave evidence that in the first weeks Tony Byrne too accepted the suicide verdict and was explicitly against the idea of an inquest. Another ex-policeman to appear was Byrne's former boyfriend Andrew Blanchette. At one stage Justice Barr counselled Blanchette that he ought to consider taking legal advice before answering a particular question. Sensationally on his second day in the witness box, Blanchette admitted that early that morning he had phoned another witness – Melinda Medich, his girlfriend and a minor at the time of Byrne's death – before she was due to give evidence later that day. Blanchette was reported to police by Medich who had not heard from him for a number of years. Blanchette denied that he had been attempting to influence her evidence.

=== Location of the body ===
Retired University of Sydney physicist and associate professor Rod Cross spent two days in the witness box. Over a six-year period Cross had produced six reports on the case, with his initial findings being quite different to the later findings presented in the trial. Although formally qualified in the field of plasma physics, Cross had experience working with biomechanists regarding sports research and had published and refereed many papers on biomechanics; he was therefore proposed by police investigators as a forensic expert in fall dynamics. Between 1998 and 2004 Cross' reports all concluded that Byrne could have jumped to her death, as he was told that Byrne's body had been found at a distance of 9 metres (30 ft) from the cliff. In 2005, when he was recontacted by the police that the position of the body was in fact farther away (11.8 metres (39 ft)), he conducted experiments which informed his speculation that Byrne could not have jumped that far and must have been thrown. The required launch speed from the top of the 29-metre (95 ft) high cliff was 4.5 m/s (15 ft/s), and the available runup distance was only 4 metres (13 ft), although appeal submissions in 2011 called this into question. Cross tested eleven females from the New South Wales Police Academy and found that they could dive and land head first (in a swimming pool) at about 3.5 m/s after a 4 metres (13 ft) runup. A strong male could throw a 61 kilograms (134 lb) female at 4.8 m/s after a runup of only 2 metres (6 ft 7 in) or 3 metres (9.8 ft).

During the trial, the Court was told of some uncertainty regarding the actual location where the body was found. Senior Constable Lisa Camwell, one of the officers who retrieved Byrne's body in 1995, gave evidence that she had in 1996 participated in a video re-enactment in which she indicated the body's location. She gave evidence that in 2004 she was contacted by an officer in charge of the murder investigation (Sergeant Powderly) and told that the position of Byrne's body had become a significant issue. She was told that the body position she had indicated on the video now appeared to be incorrect. Media reports during the second trial suggested the location of the body was an essential component to the Crown case that Byrne was not pushed nor jumped, but was forcefully thrown to her death.

=== Suicide history ===
The court heard that Byrne’s mother Andrea had committed suicide in March 1991 after she became depressed following a breast enlargement operation that went wrong. Terracini also read to the court a letter Tony Byrne had previously provided to police in which he claimed that Caroline had made an attempt on her own life via overdose in 1992. In court, Tony Byrne denied that his daughter had on that occasion intended to kill herself and instead was making "a cry for help". At another stage of the cross examination, he claimed to suppose that had Caroline wanted to kill herself she would have copied her mother Andrea's method rather than jumping from a cliff.

Byrne's doctor, author and television personality Cindy Pan, gave evidence that she had seen Byrne for two years before her death and had specifically discussed Byrne's depression with her in the weeks leading up to her death. Pan told the court Byrne said she had felt depressed for about a month and the condition had worsened in the week leading up to their appointment on 5 June 1995. Pan said the model told her she could not put a finger on what she was unhappy about.

"I was trying to explore with her what she might be depressed about, but she was not really able to identify any one specific thing," Pan told the court. She said Byrne told her she "had the same thing three years ago" and had been put on medication, which had helped. Pan said Byrne denied having thoughts of self-harm and she referred her to a psychiatrist, obtaining an appointment for 4:00 p.m. on 7 June.

=== Presentation of the defence ===
One defence witness, John Hilton, a forensic pathologist, was called during the Prosecution case, due to his later unavailability. Otherwise Terracini commenced the defence case on 27 October 2008 calling another physics expert Marcus Pandy, a biomechanical engineer who conducted experiments on running and jumping speeds of two females. Only a handful of defence witnesses were called: two forensic pathologists; one psychiatrist; Pandy; a stunt diver, and Wood's sister Jacqueline Schmidt. The defence case concluded within a week.

With the trial drawing to a close, the jury made a number of requests of Justice Barr that included a visit to the Gap for a third time; for a transcript of Doherty's evidence; and for video footage of Pandy's running experiments.

=== Deliberation and verdict ===
For the first time in New South Wales court history, a ballot was used to select the three jurors who would stand down so that twelve of the sitting fifteen would deliberate to a verdict. After five full days of deliberation on 21 November 2008 they found Wood guilty. On 3 December 2008 Wood was sentenced to a custodial sentence of 17 years, with a minimum time in prison of 13 years. Wood lodged an appeal to the conviction.

== Appeal ==
Wood's appeal hearing commenced on 22 August 2011 in the Criminal Court of Appeal before Chief Judge at Common Law Peter McClellan, Justice Megan Latham, and Justice Stephen Rothman. Wood's barrister Tim Game SC submitted that the jury's verdict was unreasonable and not supported by the evidence. His submission spoke of nine grounds for appeal. One was that the trial miscarried by reason of the prejudice occasioned by Tedeschi's closing address. Others related to criticisms of Barr's directions to the jury.

Early media reporting of the appeal focused on Game's submission that the scientific evidence used to convict Wood and presented by Associate Professor Cross was flawed. A photograph was presented in the trial and purported to be taken in 1996 showing that scrub near the fenceline had limited Byrne's possible run-up to the jump, supporting an argument that she would have needed to have been thrown to achieve the horizontal distance from the cliff wall that her body travelled. The appeal judges heard and the Crown acknowledged, that the photo was in fact taken in 2003 and that photo's quality meant that a shadow might have appeared to be scrub. The appeal judges heard that a 1996 colour photo which showed that there was no scrub limiting the run-up was available to the Crown during the trial but that the Crown had chosen to introduce the blurrier, non-contemporaneous, more ambiguous image.

Game's submission, consistent with so much of the trial evidence, concerned matters relating to the exact positioning of Byrne's body at the base of the rocks and the orientation of her legs and torso and leading to questions regarding the contended launch point and the assumptions and assertions made by Cross in his pre-trial studies and reports and his trial evidence. Day two of Game's submission focused on the police's changed view between 1996 and 2005 as to Byrne's landing spot and specifically trial evidence given by Sergeant Mark Powderly used to justify the reconstruction.

The Criminal Court of Appeal delivered their opinion on 24 February 2012 acquitting Wood of Byrne's murder and ordering his release from jail. The appellate judges delivered a unanimous decision that there was insufficient evidence beyond reasonable doubt that Wood murdered Byrne and that the jury's verdict was not supported. They dismissed the Crown evidence as being critically flawed and ruled that the possibility of her suicide ought not to have been excluded.

Justice McClennan described Cross' experiments as "unsophisticated" and in the summation of his decision said that he was not satisfied by either of the two motives presented by the Crown. Regarding the motive submitted by Tedeschi that Byrne had information about Rivkin's business dealings that Wood was trying to hide, McClennan said "The exploitation of public rumour and the use of mere innuendo to compensate for inadequate evidence of motive is not consistent with the obligations of a prosecutor to press the Crown case "to its legitimate strength" by reliance upon credible evidence". McLennan was also troubled that the notion Byrne may have been unconscious when she left the cliff top was introduced by the Crown late in the case. He described Tedeschi's suggestion, first made in his closing address and mentioned at no other time in evidence, that a "shot-put" action was used to despatch Byrne as "an invention of the prosecutor...for which there was absolutely no support in evidence". McClennan also expressed some doubt as the reliability of evidence concerning the claimed sightings of Wood and Byrne at Watsons Bay on 7 June 1995 noting that some of these witnesses had come forward years after the event and the initial investigations; he raised concerns that the Melbourne/Martin first identification of Wood and Byrne was based on a specific photos shown to them by Dally-Watkins rather than from being picked from a selection. Tedeschi was criticised by McClellan for presenting reasoning that was "dangerous" and "entirely without foundation". Tedeschi contributed to the alleged miscarriage with his "50 killer questions" which took an "impermissible course" in asking the jury to consider rhetorical questions dealing with matters that had not been presented with in evidence. McClennan ruled that he was not persuaded that Sgt Powderly's evidence regarding the changed landing position of the body was entirely reliable.

Wood was freed from prison on 24 February 2012; having served three years two months at Goulburn Correctional Centre, following an initial month at Parklea Correctional Centre. Three weeks later the new New South Wales Director of Public Prosecutions, Lloyd Babb SC, issued a press release simply announcing that "the OPDD will not appeal the Court of Criminal Appeal's judgement in the matter of R v Gordon Wood . No further comment will be issued". This was 24 hours after meeting Tony Byrne and attending the Gap with him, a meeting which Byrne described as 'fruitful'.

== Post-appeal ==
Wood left Australia after his release from prison and spent time in the United States and Britain. In 2014 he brought defamation actions against the Sydney radio stations 2GB and 2UE, Channel Seven Sydney and The Daily Telegraph which were all settled out of court in his favour for undisclosed sums.

In 2016 Wood sued the state of New South Wales for millions of dollars plus costs for malicious prosecution and wrongful imprisonment, based on a number of grounds including a "hopelessly corrupted" and "ridiculous" police case against him. In a witness statement filed as part of his lawsuit against the state, Wood said that during his three years in Goulburn Jail he lived in constant fear of guards who dished out "therapy" and was king-hit, (a sucker punch) and knocked unconscious in the prison yard by an infamous rapist and killer. The suit was dismissed on 10 August 2018, with Wood receiving no compensation.

== See also ==
- List of unsolved deaths
