= Helena Carr =

Australian businesswoman (1946–2023)

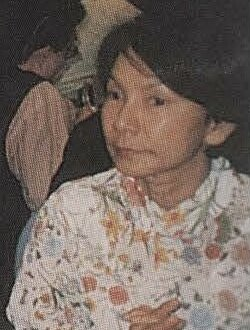
- Carr in 1997
- Born: Anne Helena John; September 1946; Taiping, Perak, Malayan Union
- Died: 25 October 2023 (aged 77); Vienna, Austria
- Education: Bachelor of Economics
- Alma mater: University of Sydney
- Occupation: Businesswoman
- Spouse: Bob Carr (m. 1973)

Helena Carr (born Anne Helena John; September 1946 – 25 October 2023) was an Australian businesswoman and the wife of former premier of New South Wales, former senator and former foreign minister Bob Carr.

== Early life ==
Anne Helena John was born in Perak, Malaysia, the youngest of six children of an Indian father and a Chinese mother. In 1965, she came to Sydney to study at Our Lady of Mercy College, Parramatta. As economics was one of her strongest subjects, she majored in it at the University of Sydney where she was a resident at Sancta Sophia College.

Carr joined Leigh Mardon, a subsidiary of Coca-Cola Amatil, in 1976, first as a market research officer and then as a product manager. She left in 1981 to join Amatil before returning to Leigh Mardon, as a business development manager and then a division manager, where she was responsible for a staff of 1,000.

== Marriage and politics ==
In 1972, she met Bob Carr on a vacation in Tahiti and the two were married on 24 February 1973.

Bob Carr became federal president of Young Labor shortly after. Helena Carr started a successful business career and by the 1980s, she was the managing director of Leigh Mardon. In 1992, Carr and Max Turner partnered with politician Eddie Obeid to offer A$16 million for Offset Alpine. She later pulled out of the deal, leading Obeid to partner instead with Rene Rivkin and Graham Richardson for a successful, $15 million offer.

Carr and Max Turner later bought Merritt Madden Printing and Advanced Graphics, a commercial printer producing prospectuses, annual reports, and trade magazines. In October 2004, she and Turner sold the business to the New Zealand company Blue Star Print Group.

In October 2023, Helena Carr died from a brain aneurysm while in Vienna, Austria, aged 77. Her funeral was held at St Mary's Cathedral, Sydney, on 14 November.
