= Richo =

Richo may refer to:

- Matthew Richardson (footballer), a former Australian footballer
- Alan Richardson, former Australian rules footballer and coach
- Daniel Rich, Australian rules footballer
- Graham Richardson, an Australian politician turned political commentator
  - Richo, a television program hosted by Graham 'Richo' Richardson airing on Sky News Australia.
  - Richo + Jones, a television program hosted by Graham 'Richo' Richardson and Alan Jones airing on Sky News Australia.
