= The Gap (Sydney) =

Ocean cliff in Sydney, Australia

Coordinates: 33°50′37″S 151°17′05″E

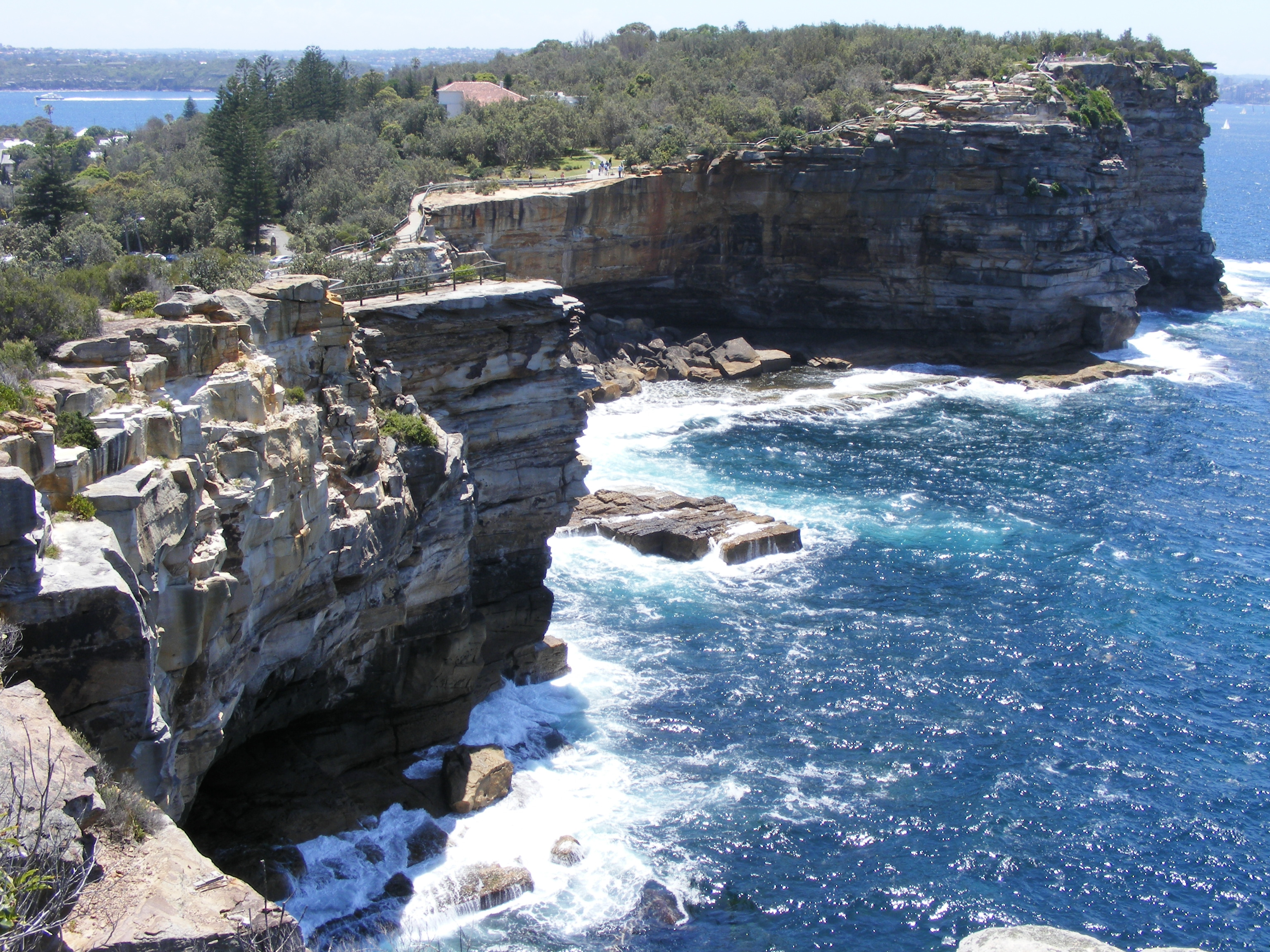
Looking north towards high cliffs that create The Gap near Watsons Bay

The Gap is an ocean cliff at South Head in the Eastern Suburbs of Sydney, Australia. The area, which faces the Tasman Sea, is located in the suburb of Watsons Bay. Although the cliff is a popular tourist destination, it has infamy for suicides.

== History ==
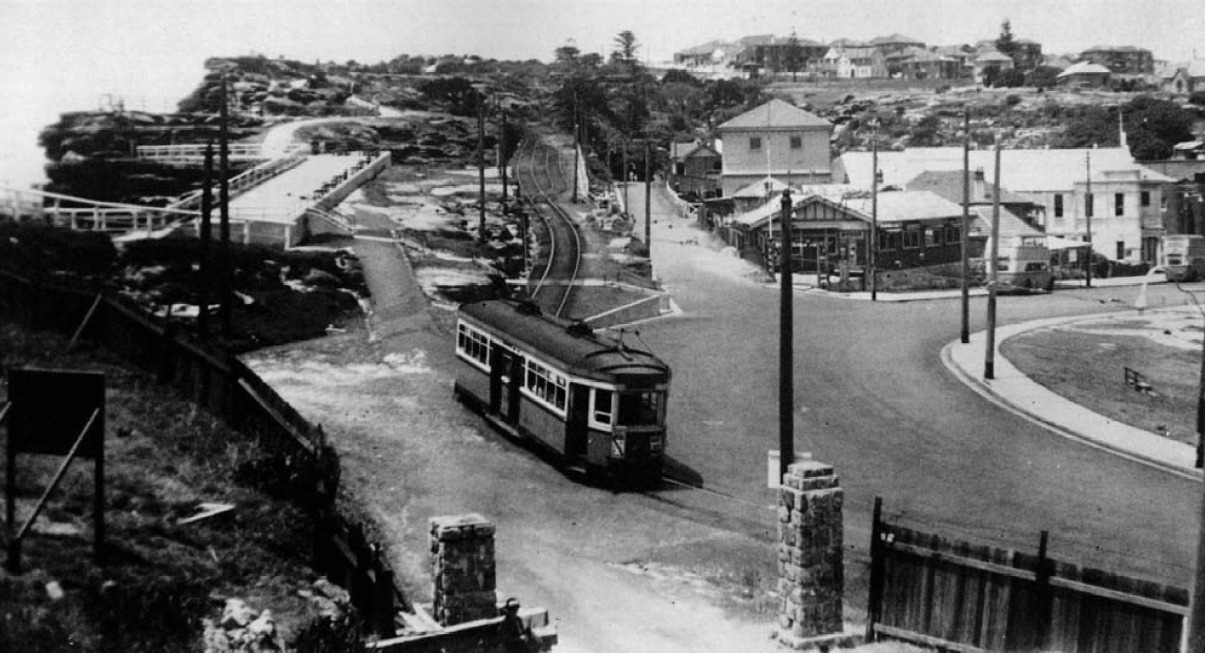
A tram passing through The Gap on its way to Watsons Bay, c.1949

Prior to European colonisation, The Gap was inhabited by the Birrabirragal Aboriginal clan, who were part of the coastal Darug people. Shortly after the arrival of the First Fleet in 1788, the British established a makeshift signalling station on the ridge above The Gap. Its role was to give early warning to the colony of any approaching ship. A formal signal station was established in 1790, serviced by a bridle trail that developed into the Old South Head Road by 1811. Pilots based at Camp Cove in Watsons Bay would meet ships at the entrance to Port Jackson in order to guide them safely into Sydney harbour.

In 1871, a year after the official withdrawal of Imperial British forces, the headland around The Gap became a military garrison when work began to build coastal artillery emplacements to defend the Port of Sydney. Construction was undertaken by the colonial government's militia under the command of British military engineers. The first barracks, which were occupied by members of the New South Wales Artillery, were completed by 1877. Extensions were added in 1880 to accommodate additional personnel. Many of the early barracks are still standing near The Gap.

By 1895, the area was being used by the fledgling Australian Army as a gunnery school. In 1942 the Royal Australian Navy established a radar training school nearby. The facility was initially named HMAS Radar, but was later commissioned as HMAS Watson on 14 March 1945. Torpedo and anti-submarine warfare training were relocated to Watson in 1956. Visitors are sometimes permitted to visit the clifftop chapel that was dedicated in 1962 to service personnel who served at The Gap. The Gap has been part of Sydney Harbour National Park since 1982. In 1990, the area was opened to the public to offer access to the spectacular cliff views and walks.

=== Shipwreck ===
In 1857 the sailing ship Dunbar carrying 63 passengers and 59 crew struck the rocky cliff at the foot of The Gap. The Dunbar, which was captained by James Green, had left England on 31 May 1857 arriving off Botany Bay shortly after dark on 20 August 1857. In poor visibility and stormy weather, Captain Green misjudged the entrance to the harbour. The Dunbar drove into the rocky cliff at the foot of The Gap causing the ship's topmasts to snap and the ship to turn broadside against the rocks because of the pounding of the waves. By light next day, crowds watched as breakers pounded victims' corpses against the rocks. Other bodies amid cargo and wreckage were washed inside Sydney harbour with the incoming tide; many of the dead were naked and had been mutilated by sharks. The funeral of the Dunbar victims was one of the longest processions ever seen in Sydney. The unidentified dead were buried in a common grave at Camperdown Cemetery.

A young sailor named James Johnson was the only survivor. He was rescued after clinging to a rocky ledge below The Gap for 36 hours. Johnson, who was later employed at the lighthouse near Newcastle, rescued another lone survivor from the wreckage of the steamer, SS Cawarra, in July 1866.

The Dunbar's anchor was recovered more than fifty years later and placed on the cliffs at Watsons Bay with a memorial tablet.

== Geology, fauna and flora ==
The Gap is formed from Sydney sandstone making it part of the Sydney basin. The cliff was laid as sediment more than 200 million years ago in the Triassic period. During the Jurassic period, 40 million years later, a cataclysmic event resulted in an enormous crack forming within the strata. This fault allowed erosion from wave action to create the cliff line around Sydney. Tessellated basalt rock platforms lie at the base of the cliff because The Gap is bordered to the south and west by an older sequence of largely low-grade metamorphic and granitic rocks of the Lachlan Fold Belt. Northwards these rocks pass into the Hunter Valley sequence that is transitional between the Sydney Basin and New England Fold Belt. The Gap itself forms a sequence that continues offshore to the edge of the Sahul Shelf. The total maximum thickness of rock formations within the Sydney Basin are in depth ranges of 5,000 metres (16,000 ft).

The rock is a very porous stone. It is composed of very pure silica grains and a small amount of the iron mineral siderite in varying proportions, bound with a clay matrix. The Gap's warm yellow-brown colour is due to oxidation of the stone.

Skinks and eastern water dragons can often be seen moving among the rocks. Seabirds, such as the silver gull and the Pacific gull use the cliff for nesting sites. The sandstone cliff has created nutrient-poor soils similar to those found around Sydney. As nutrients are scarce, plants which survive on The Gap cannot afford to lose leaves to herbivores so they defend their foliage with toxins. Vegetation includes the eucalypts which produces such toxins.

== Suicide location ==
The Gap is a well known place for suicides in Australia and there are around 50 suicides at The Gap each year. The tall cliffs have made it a location for those wishing to end their lives. Between 2008 and 2011, numerous measures have been implemented to dissuade those at risk of suicide, including security cameras to monitor the area, several purpose-built Lifeline counselling phone booths, and information boards from the Black Dog Institute and Beyond Blue. An inward-leaning fence has also been erected to deter people from jumping.

People who have survived the jump have had severe consequences, including paralysis, organ damage, broken bones, and lifelong pain. Most think that jumping from The Gap will lead to an instant death, but for many, death is not instant.

On the afternoon of 20 April 1936, noted Australian diarist Meta Truscott recorded how she and her uncle, Christopher Dunne, witnessed a suicide at The Gap. By chance, the pair shared a bench with a well-dressed, middle-aged man who was later identified as William Albert Swivell. As the three watched a ship sail through the Sydney Heads, her uncle asked the man if he knew its name, to which Swivell replied, "The Nieuw Holland". Soon afterwards, the smartly-dressed man stood up and walked away; he climbed to the top of the cliff and jumped. Swivell survived the fall but died as he was being rescued.

In June 1995, a 24-year-old model, Caroline Byrne, fell to her death at The Gap. Due to the notoriety of the area, police did not initially suspect foul play. However, in 2008, her then-boyfriend was convicted of pushing her over the edge, but in February 2012, he was acquitted of her murder on appeal.

In November 2007, Charmaine Dragun, a 29-year-old newsreader who worked for 10 News First, jumped from The Gap after battling depression and anorexia.

=== Angel of The Gap ===
In 2009, Don Ritchie, a former World War II Royal Australian Navy veteran and retired insurance agent, was awarded a Medal of the Order of Australia for preventing suicides at The Gap. From 1964, Ritchie saved 180 people from jumping from the cliffs by crossing the road from his property and engaging them in conversation, often beginning with the words "Can I help you in some way?" Afterwards Ritchie would invite them back to his home for a cup of tea and a chat. Some would return years later to thank him for his efforts in talking them out of their decision. Ritchie, who was nicknamed the "Angel of The Gap", died in May 2012.

== Gallery ==
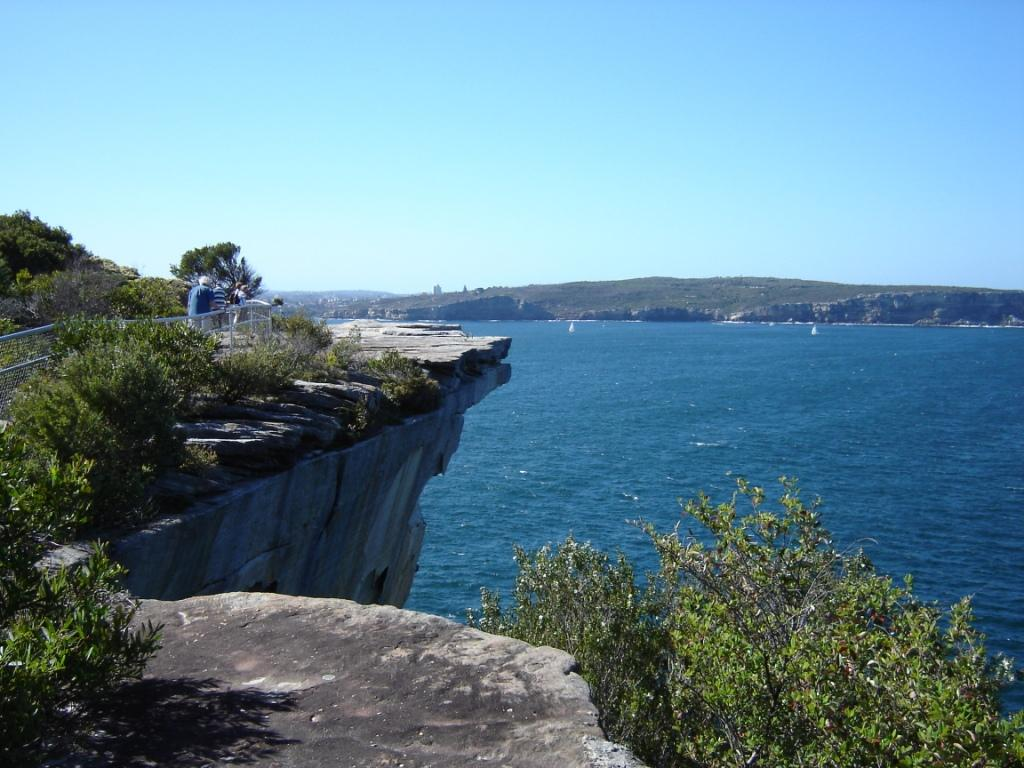
The Gap looking out over the Tasman Sea to the north

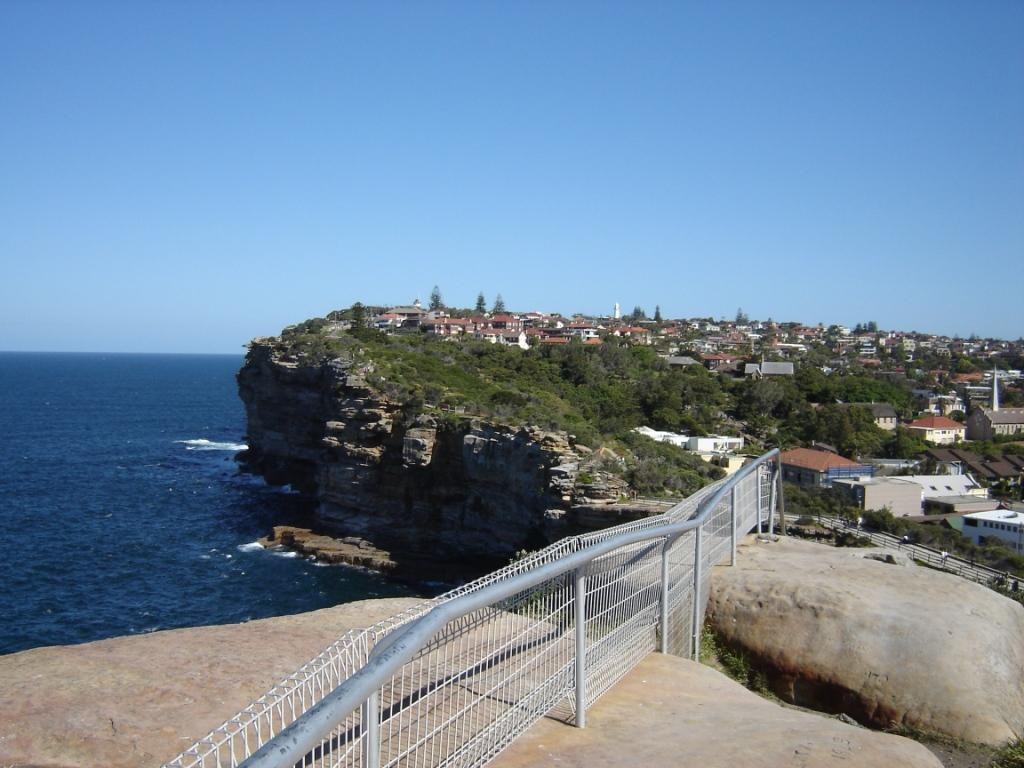
The Gap looking out over Vaucluse the Tasman Sea to the south

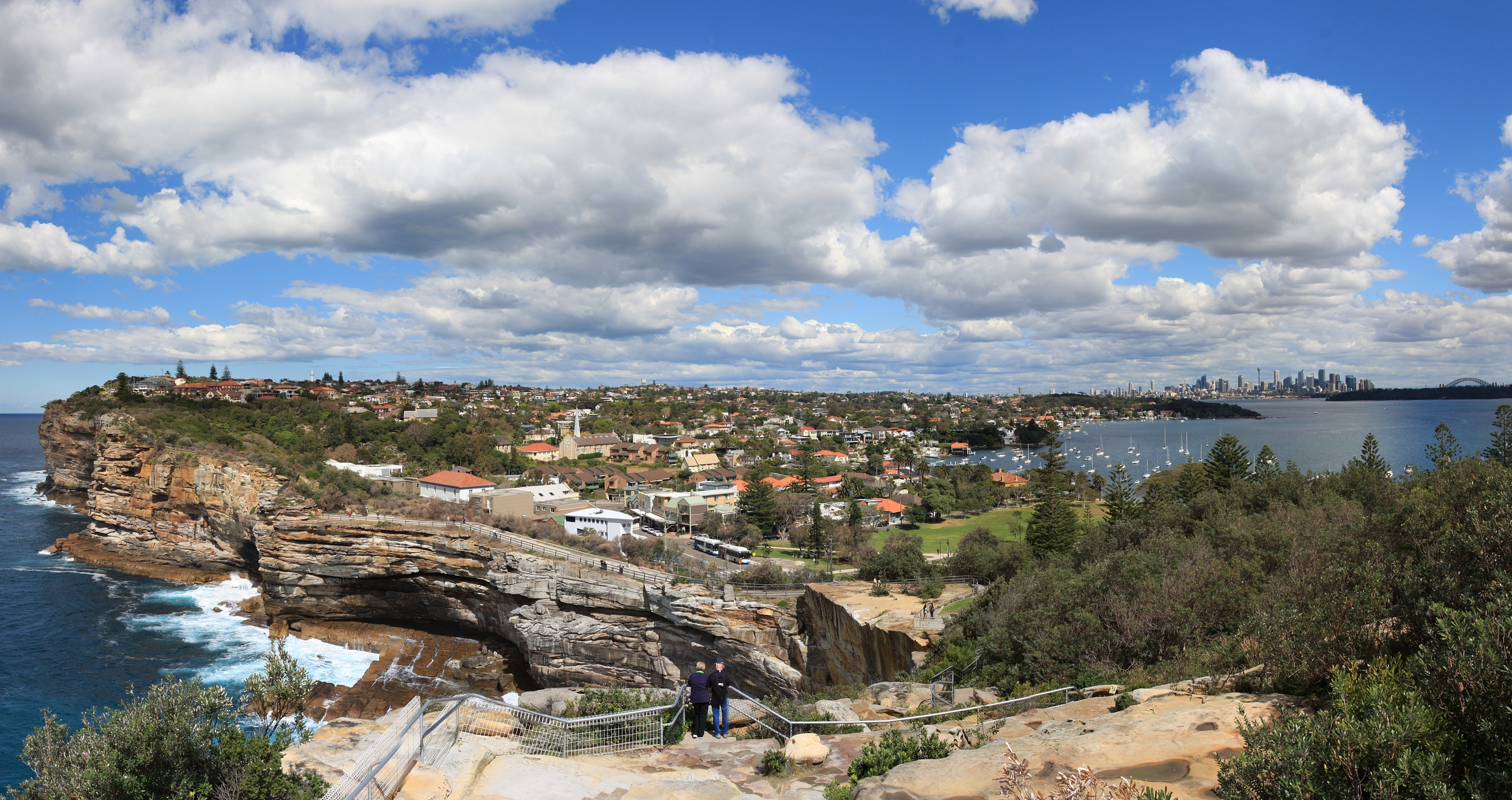
Looking south over Watsons Bay and Vaucluse with the City of Sydney and harbour on the right

== See also ==
- Golden Gate Bridge, United States
- Beachy Head, England
- Tōjinbō, Japan
- Nanjing Yangtze River Bridge, China
