= Charmaine Dragun =

Australian journalist (1978–2007)

- Dragun in Croatia, early 2007
- Born: Charmaine Margaret Dragun; 21 March 1978; Perth, Western Australia
- Died: 2 November 2007 (aged 29); Sydney, Australia
- Cause of death: Suicide by jumping
- Education: Western Australian Academy of Performing Arts
- Occupations: Journalist; news presenter
- Years active: 1996–2007
- Partner: Simon Struthers (fiancé)

Charmaine Margaret Dragun (/ˈdræɡuːn/; 21 March 1978 – 2 November 2007) was an Australian broadcast journalist and presenter. She was a co-anchor on Ten Eyewitness News. Dragun, who had been diagnosed with depression and had a history of anorexia, died by suicide in 2007.

== Education and career ==
Dragun graduated from the Western Australian Academy of Performing Arts with a degree in broadcast journalism. She began her career as a radio journalist and newsreader at Perth radio stations 6PR and 96FM. She was nominated for Young Journalist of the Year and won both the Australian and state Best Radio Reports award.

Dragun switched from radio to television when she was offered a position at Network Ten. She started out reporting a wide range of stories from entertainment news to major national news stories and eventually began court reporting regularly. She occasionally filled in as a presenter on Perth's Ten News First and on 4 July 2005, she was appointed as permanent news anchor for the show, which was broadcast from Network Ten's Sydney studio TEN at Pyrmont, New South Wales. She was a main co-anchor of Ten News First and also filled in on the national morning and weekend news bulletins and presented Sports Tonight on Fridays. Dragun's co-anchor, veteran broadcaster Tim Webster, described her as "one of the most professional I've ever seen, very meticulous...if she made a mistake she was distraught about it."

== Personal life ==
=== Perth ===
Charmaine Margaret Dragun was born in Perth, Western Australia to Estelle and Michael Dragun. According to her mother, Dragun was a perfectionist and developed anorexia while she was attending university at the WA Academy of Performing Arts and continued to have problems related to anorexia periodically for the next several years. When she was 18 years old, she saw a psychiatrist to address the eating disorder and was also diagnosed with depression; she was prescribed SSRI antidepressants, which she continued taking for several years.

Dragun was engaged to Simon Struthers, a forensic investigator, whom she had been dating since she was 16 years old, and they were planning to marry on Dragun's 30th birthday.

In 2004, eight months before moving to Sydney, Dragun told her mother that her medication made her feel numb and she started seeing a psychiatrist who recommended that Dragun discontinue medication altogether. Her mother said that Dragun's symptoms started to go "down hill" after six weeks off antidepressants. She moved back home with her parents and temporarily ended her relationship with Struthers, stating that she could not give him happiness. She restarted pharmacotherapy on what was then a new class of antidepressants, serotonin–norepinephrine reuptake inhibitors (SNRIs), prescribed by her general practitioner (GP), which she took until 2007.

=== Sydney ===
When she moved to Sydney in 2005, Dragun and Struthers reunited and after a few months, were living together in Sydney. Dragun had difficulty adjusting to the new city and being so far from family. She started working with a clinical psychologist there that she reportedly had a good rapport with, according to Dragun's mother.

Around August or September 2007, Dragun's symptoms worsened and her psychologist recommended that Dragun consult a psychiatrist about adjusting her medication. In October 2007, her new psychiatrist had initiated a cross-taper to change Dragun from the SNRI to a different brand of SSRI, a change which can take up to six weeks to take effect. Dragun initially told her mother that she was optimistic about the switch, but after less than three weeks, she told her mother over the phone that she was having thoughts of suicide and that she felt "worthless." Dragun died by suicide a few days later.

== Suicide ==
On 2 November 2007, at age 29, Dragun died by suicide near The Gap in Sydney's Eastern Suburbs. According to news reports, Dragun sat near the gully for around two hours, something she had done several times in the weeks leading up to her suicide, and sent a farewell text message to Struthers before jumping to her death. Witnesses who had seen someone sitting near the popular suicide spot had contacted the police, but Dragun was dead by the time officers arrived. A funeral was held ten days later at All Saints Church in Greenwood, Western Australia.

During 2010, an official inquest into the medical support surrounding Dragun at the time of her death was held by the Coroner's Court in Glebe, New South Wales, a suburb of Sydney. The deputy state coroner stated that the ease of access to The Gap had been a causal factor. He also estimated that Dragun had "almost certainly" been misdiagnosed with depression and had actually had a bipolar II disorder, concluding that she had not received the correct treatment with a mood stabiliser that, in his view, probably would have saved her life. Furthermore, some of her doctors had failed to pass on to others the fact that she had had suicidal thoughts. While the "cross tapering" programme she had been placed on, where the dose of one drug is decreased while another drug is introduced, also had the side effects of increased anxiety, suicidal thoughts and confusion and was argued to be inadequate, the coroner emphasised that her medication had not "put [suicidal] ideas into her head or cause(d) her to behave in an irrational way and with no control over her actions".
