= Rod Cross =

Australian physicist

Rod Cross is a physicist and retired academic of the University of Sydney. He is an expert on Alfvén waves in the field of plasma physics but his recent interest in Sports Mechanics has led him to be a consultant to the police in murder investigations, most notably the Caroline Byrne case. The New South Wales Court of Criminal Appeal found that his evidence as an "expert witness" in the trial of Gordon Wood had "little if any evidentiary value" due to his failure to remain impartial and offer independent expertise. He responded to the Court's criticism that his evidence was "not particularly sophisticated."
