= Trevor Kennedy =

Australian businessman (1942–2021)

Trevor Kennedy AM (born Trevor John Kennedy; born in Perth, Western Australia, on 24 June 1942; died 28 November 2021) was an Australian businessman and company director. He served on the board of directors of many Australian companies, including Consolidated Press Holdings and Qantas. He was a journalist and right-hand man of Kerry Packer and a former business associate of Malcolm Turnbull.

== Education ==
Kennedy was educated at Aquinas College, Perth.

== Business career ==
Kennedy was founding editor of The National Times (1972–73). In 1997 he was appointed Chairman of AWA He served as editor in chief of Consolidated Press Holdings (1981–86) and then as managing director of Consolidated Press Holdings (1986–91).

He was a member of the Australian Federal Government's Remuneration Tribunal (1995-2000).

During his career he also served as chairman of Oil Search, Commsoft Group and Cypress Lakes Group, and as a director of both public and private companies, including Qantas Superannuation, Downer EDI, FTR Holdings and RG Capital.

In 1983 Kennedy was appointed to be a Member in the Ordinary Division of the Order of Australia (AM).

== Later events ==
In 2003 Kennedy resigned from his position as director of seven public companies (including Qantas).

In 2005 the stockbroker Rene Rivkin told Swiss investigators that he, Kennedy and the politician Graham Richardson were secret owners of a $27 million stake in the Offset Alpine Printing company.

Kennedy died on 28 November 2021.
