= Meta Truscott =

Australian diarist (1917–2014)

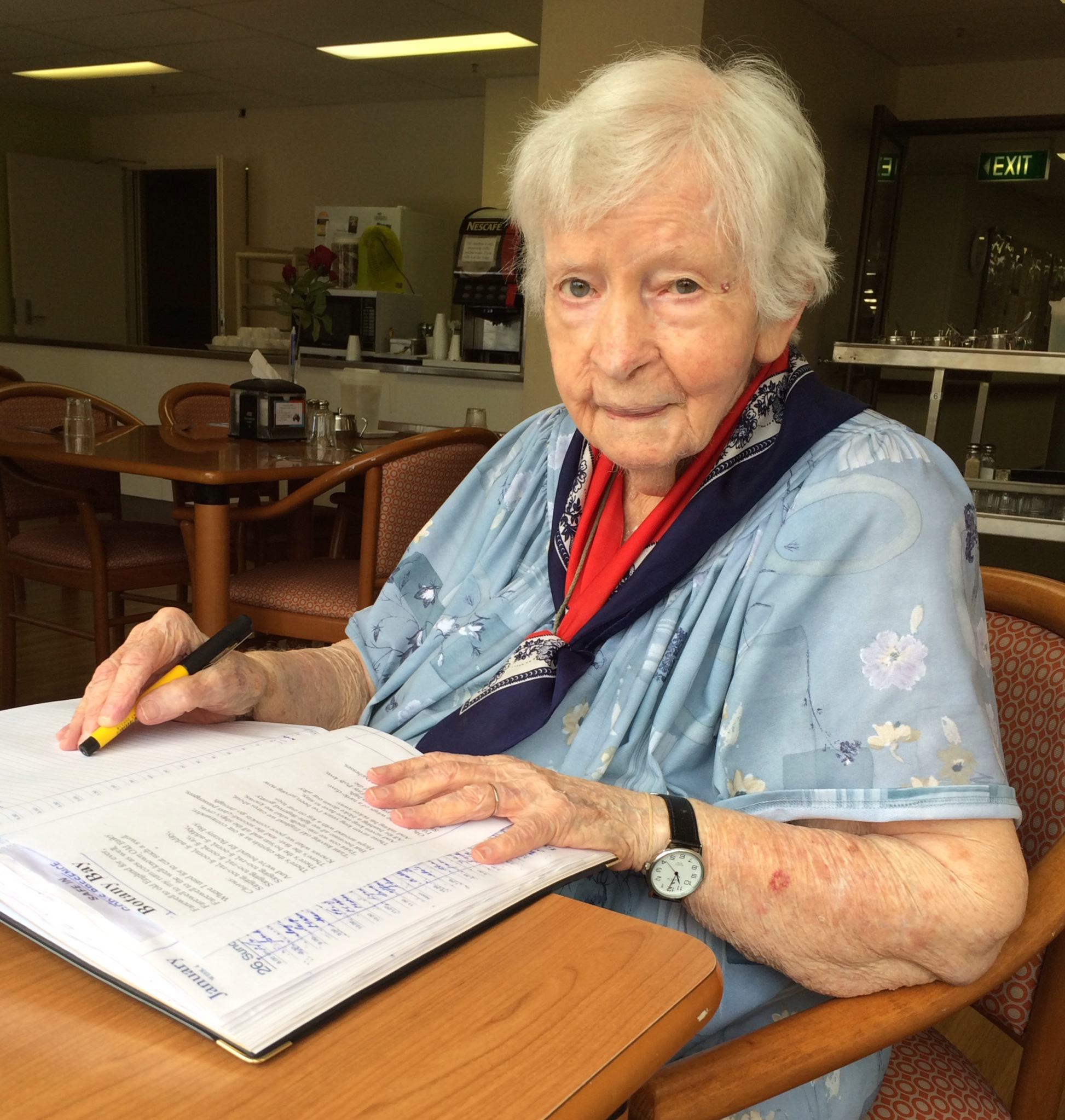
Meta Truscott – Australian diarist and Ashgrove historian

Meta Truscott (3 June 1917 – 27 November 2014) was an Australian diarist and Ashgrove historian. For over 80 years, she wrote a daily diary and collected scrapbooks, with pasted-in newspaper clippings and other ephemera (1934–2014). The diaries record the day-to-day life of a woman who had lived in Queensland all her life. The collection (97 boxes) is in the Fryer Library, University of Queensland.

== Life ==
Born Meta Frances Hurley in Toowoomba, Queensland. Meta Truscott attended St Joseph's Convent School, Nundah where she later completed a business course. For ten years, she worked in the office of a furniture firm and then five years in an accountant's office. Married in 1947, she had three children, including James Francis Truscott. In 1994, the Brisbane City Council named Meta Truscott Lane in Ashgrove to honour her contribution to Ashgrove local history. The Ashgrove Historical Society appointed her co-patron with Manfred Cross.

== Diaries ==
On 1 January 1934, aged sixteen and a half, Truscott née Hurley began her first diary; a Christmas gift from her maternal uncle, Christopher Dunne, Station Master at Toowoomba railway station. During September that year, her saddest entry recorded the sudden death of her father aged 63 in the Mater Misericordiae Hospital, Brisbane. On completing her first year, she was "hooked" and wrote a daily diary until her death.

Notable entries include her witness account of a suicide. On Monday afternoon, 20 April 1936, while visiting The Gap, Sydney with her uncle, Christopher Dunne, they by chance shared a bench with a well-dressed, middle-aged man. He was later identified as William Albert Swivell. The three watched a ship sail through the Sydney Heads. Dunne asked Swivell if he knew the name of the ship. He answered, "The Nieuw Holland." Soon after, Swivell walked away; he climbed to the top of the cliff and jumped to his death. Other significant entries describe the beginning and the end of World War II. The diaries record the stillness, the state of shock when war was declared and how Brisbane city went wild with joy the day the war ended.

Her busiest year was 1988. Alongside writing her regular diary, she wrote two extra diaries: one for the Australian Bicentenary now lodged in the Ashgrove library and another for her two older grandchildren. She wrote two further diaries, one for her two younger grandchildren (1998) and one for her daughter (2003).

== Published works ==
- Truscott, M. Diaries (1934–2014) University of Queensland Library OCLC Number: 505956985
- Truscott, M. (1977) Ashgrove district and its schools: information. Brisbane. OCLC Number: 224670801
- Truscott, M. (1977) Alexander Stewart, 1868–1918, and Glenlyon House, Ashgrove Brisbane. OCLC Number: 224643125
- Truscott, M. Talk given at the Diamond Jubilee, 1873–1933, of The Gap Methodist Church Ashgrove, Qld (Date?) OCLC Number: 224574713
- Truscott, M. (1987) Parish of St John's Wood The Gap: Golden Jubilee History 1937–1987 St John’s Wood, the Gap Catholic Church. OCLC Number: 746584795
- Truscott, M. (1990). A portrait of Ashgrove. In M. Farrelly, Canvas of dreams: A history of Marist College Ashgrove, to 1990 (pp. 249–258). Brisbane: Watson Ferguson & Company.
- Truscott, M and Jackson, C. (2000) Enjoying historic Ashgrove. Brisbane Qld: Brisbane City Council. OCLC Number: 505727321
- Segment on diaries in Simon Townsend Wonder world, June 1985

== Contributed to historical research of ==
- Marist College Ashgrove
- Marist Fathers
- Ashgrove State School
- Brisbane Bicentenary
- Mount St Michael's School
- Mater Dei School, St John's Wood
- Provided primary source material to historical research on Irish migration to Australia
