= Richo (TV program) =

2011–2021 Australian news and commentary program

- Title card from 2017–present
- Genre: News, Current affairs, Commentary
- Presented by: Graham Richardson
- Country of origin: Australia
- Original language: English
- No. of seasons: 7

Production
- Production location: Sydney
- Running time: 60 mins (inc. ads)

Original release
- Network: Sky News Australia
- Release: 23 February 2011 – 2021

Related
- Richo + Jones

Title card (2011–2016)

Richo was a weekly Australian television news and commentary program, formerly broadcast on Sky News Live. Hosted by Graham Richardson, it premiered on 23 February 2011, and aired each Wednesday night at 8pm (originally 7:30pm) AEST.

The series focuses on mainly political topics, featuring interviews and panel discussions, but also includes segments related to business and sport. Richardson described the format as "a mix of light-hearted commentary but with all the facts."

The program spawned a spin-off titled Richo + Jones, which premiered in February 2014, in which Richardson co-hosts with Alan Jones.

Due to a number of Richardson's health issues, Richo has been guest hosted by a number of other Sky News presenters. From April 2016, the program was put on hiatus and temporarily replaced with new format Beattie + Reith due to Richardson being on medical leave from Sky News while undergoing major surgery. In October 2016, it was announced that Beattie + Reith would join the Sky News lineup permanently on Monday evenings, with the Wednesday timeslot replaced by Credlin & Keneally in November, suggesting Richo would remain on indefinite hiatus.

In January 2017, it was announced Richo will return from 3 February 2017, airing on Friday nights. The program returned to its original Wednesday timeslot in May 2017. The show ended in 2021.
