= Jones + Co =

Australian commentary program

- Also known as: Richo + Jones (original title)
- Genre: News, Current Affairs, Commentary
- Presented by: Alan Jones; Peta Credlin (2017–2021); Mark Latham (2016–2017); Graham Richardson (2014–2016)
- Country of origin: Australia
- Original language: English
- No. of seasons: 4

Production
- Running time: 60 minutes (Including advertisements)

Original release
- Network: Sky News Australia
- Release: February 2014 – November 2021

Related
- Richo

Richardson and Jones interviewing Clive Palmer from their set

Jones & Co (originally known as Richo + Jones) is a weekly Australian television news and commentary program, broadcast on Sky News Australia from 2014 to 2021. The program aired each Tuesday night at 8 pm AEST. The most recent co-hosts were Alan Jones and Peta Credlin, while previous co-hosts alongside Jones include Graham Richardson and Mark Latham.

The series focused on mainly political topics. The program usually began with the duo interviewing a prominent politician or political commentator.

== Background ==
The program is a spin-off of the Richo program which premiered 23 February three years earlier and is hosted solely by Richardson.

It was originally titled Richo + Jones and co-hosted by Graham Richardson and Alan Jones when it premiered in February 2014, but due to Richardson's ill health, Mark Latham replaced him as co-host in 2016 (at Jones' suggestion), and the program was re-titled to its current name. Management declined to simply retitle the show Jones and Latham because they were concerned Latham was "too much of a risk" as host and instead used the more general name Jones & Co.

Latham's employment was terminated by Sky News on 29 March 2017 following several controversial statements made on the program and his other program Outsiders with his last appearance on 21 March 2017. In May 2017, Peta Credlin was named the new co-host of the program.

From 25 November 2014 the show was simulcast on radio 2GB alongside the Sky News broadcast, however this has since been discontinued.

=== Guest hosts ===
Title card used for Richo + Jones (2014–2016)

For a few weeks in July 2014 while Jones was commentating the 2014 Commonwealth Games for another network, Peter Reith filled in for Jones on the program, however it was still referred to on air as Richo + Jones.

Jones hosted the program solo on September 23, 2014, when Richo was absent for an unspecified health reason. On September 30 and October 7, 2014, Kristina Keneally filled in for Richo while he was on holidays, and the show was also referred to as Jones + Keneally in some promos during this period.

Frequently throughout 2015, Jones hosted the program alone due to Richo's ill health and associated cancer treatments. The program was referred to as Jones + Beattie when Peter Beattie filled in for Richo on June 23, 2015.

From April 2016, the program was retitled Jones + Co due to Richardson being absent while undergoing major surgery, with Mark Latham among those guest co-hosting with Jones.

== Reception ==
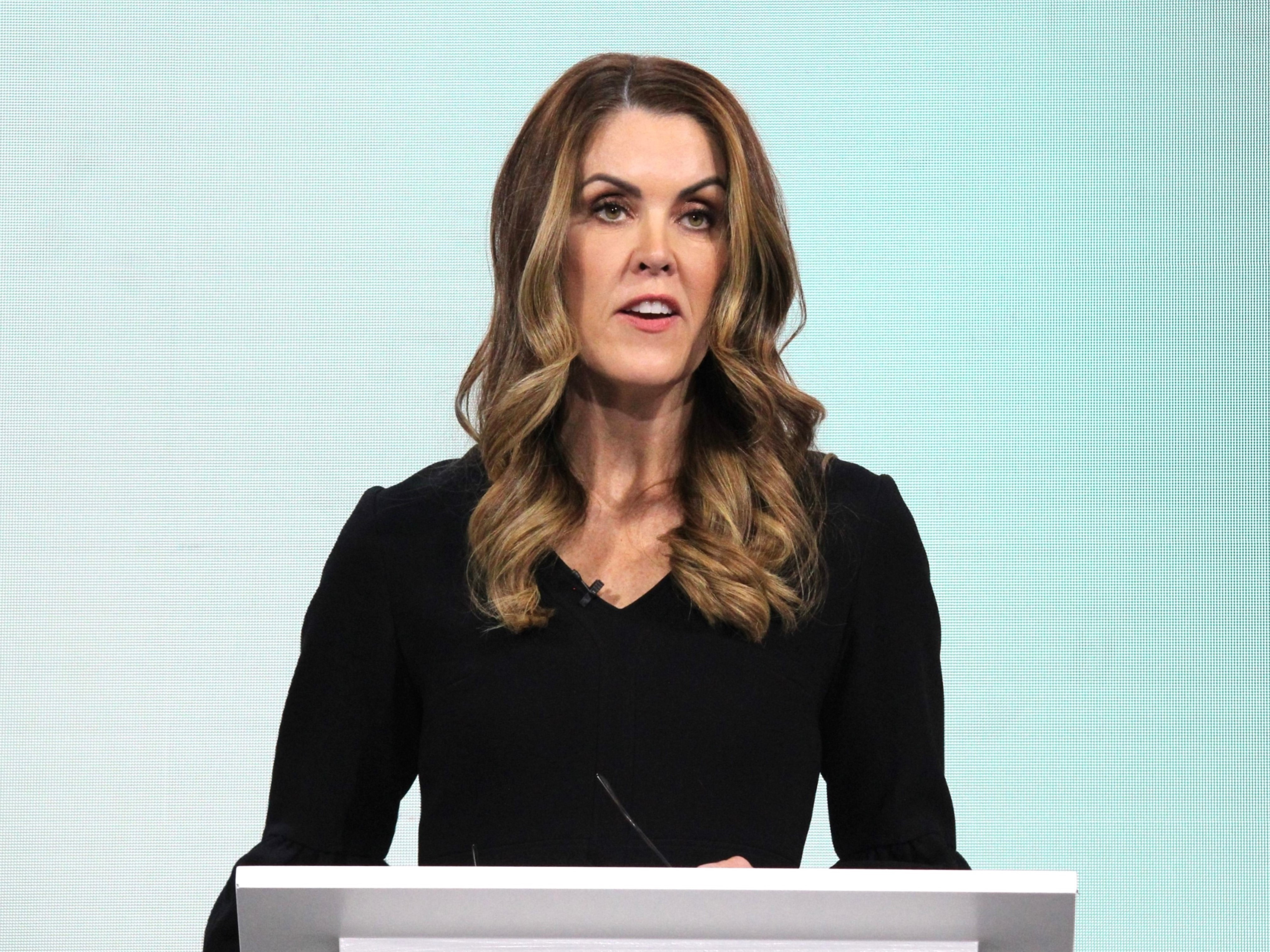
Petra Credlin in 2025

The highest rating episode of the season (as of September 2014) was on 21 August 2013, which reached 55,000 viewers. The episode on 22 April 2014 was the twentieth most watched show on subscription television reaching 39,000 viewers and was the channel's second highest broadcast that day. An episode on 17 June, featuring a live interview with Clive Palmer, was the seventeenth most watched show on subscription television and the most watched broadcast on Sky News with 43,000 viewers.

Jones & Co posted 29% audience growth year-on-year in the first half of 2018.

== See also ==
- List of Australian television series
