= Graham Richardson =

Australian politician (1949–2025)

The Honourable Graham Richardson AO
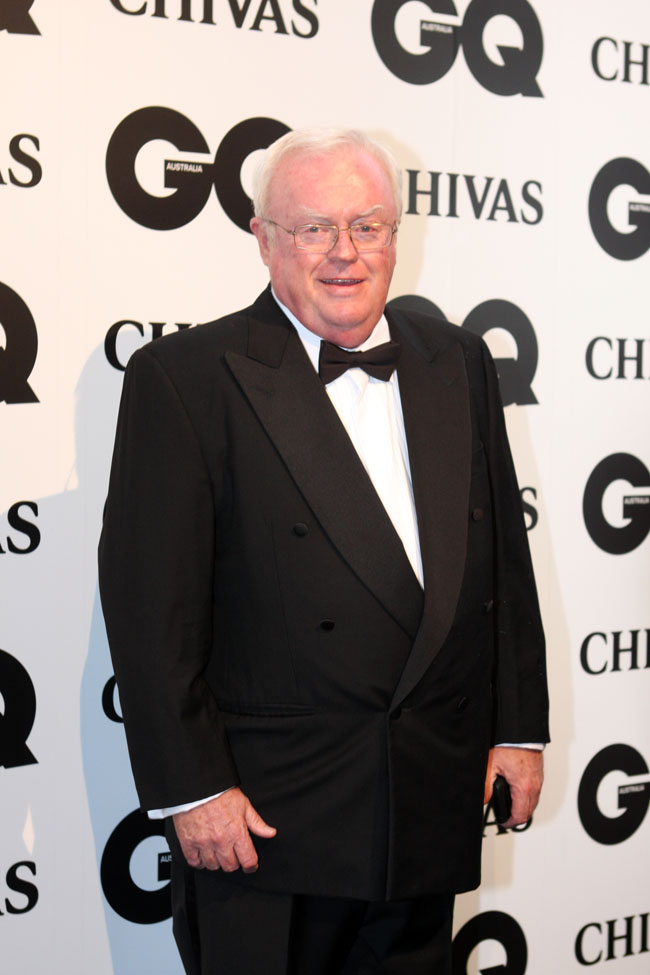
- Richardson in 2011

Minister for the Environment, Sport and Territories
- In office 1 March 1994 – 25 March 1994
- Prime Minister: Paul Keating
- Preceded by: Ros Kelly
- Succeeded by: John Faulkner

Minister for the Arts, Sport, the Environment, Tourism and Territories
- In office 19 January 1988 – 4 April 1990
- Prime Minister: Bob Hawke
- Preceded by: John Brown
- Succeeded by: Ros Kelly

Minister for Health
- In office 24 March 1993 – 25 March 1994
- Prime Minister: Paul Keating
- Preceded by: Brian Howe (as Minister for Health, Housing and Community Services)
- Succeeded by: Carmen Lawrence (as Minister for Human Services and Health)

Minister for Transport and Communications
- In office 27 December 1991 – 18 May 1992
- Prime Minister: Paul Keating
- Preceded by: John Kerin
- Succeeded by: Bob Collins

Minister for Social Security
- In office 4 April 1990 – 27 December 1991
- Prime Minister: Bob Hawke; Paul Keating
- Preceded by: Brian Howe
- Succeeded by: Neal Blewett

Vice-President of the Executive Council
- In office 1 February 1991 – 18 May 1992
- Preceded by: Kim Beazley
- Succeeded by: Ralph Willis

Senator for New South Wales
- In office 5 March 1983 – 25 March 1994
- Preceded by: Tony Mulvihill
- Succeeded by: Michael Forshaw

Personal details
- Born: Graham Frederick Richardson; 27 September 1949 Sydney, New South Wales, Australia
- Died: 8 November 2025 (aged 76) Sydney, New South Wales, Australia
- Party: Labor
- Spouses: Cheryl Gardener (m. 1973, divorced); Amanda (m. 2007)
- Children: 3
- Nickname: Richo

Graham Frederick Richardson (27 September 1949 – 8 November 2025) was an Australian Labor Party politician who was a senator for New South Wales from 1983 to 1994 and served as a cabinet minister in both the Hawke and Keating governments. He was later a media commentator, public speaker and political lobbyist.

During his time in the Senate, Richardson was often referred to as a "power broker" within the Labor Right faction. Prior to entering parliament, Richardson was a Labor Party branch organiser and was the general secretary of the New South Wales branch of the party from 1976 to 1983.

After retiring from politics, Richardson became a political commentator for Sky News Australia. He had previously hosted the weekly commentary program Richo.

== Early life ==
Graham Richardson was born in Sydney on 27 September 1949 and was the only surviving child of Frederick "Fred" James Richardson and Catherine "Peggy" Maud Richardson (née Graham), who were, respectively, the New South Wales state secretary and office manager of the Amalgamated Postal and Telecommunications Union. Raised Catholic, he was influenced as an adolescent by the factional fights that arose during the 1955 Labor split. His early years of schooling took place at St Raphael's Primary School in Hurstville and Marist College Kogarah. In November 1965, he was seriously injured in a car accident, in which his father was driving, at Tom Uglys Bridge at Dolls Point, resulting in the removal of his spleen, a torn bowel and 200 stitches to his face. His condition was so serious that he received last rites on two occasions in hospital. He later recalled:

The worst moment – not just of my adolescence but of my life – was the day they took off the bandages and I saw myself in the mirror. I cried for hours ... It made me very unsettled. It really mucked me around badly, not to the point of being psychiatrically impaired but it did me a lot of harm in terms of stability and the capacity to concentrate.

Richardson recovered however and completed his schooling at Sydney Technical High School where he passed his Leaving Certificate. From 1966, he was active in the Catholic Youth Organisation, a recruiting ground for the right wing of Young Labor, where he formed friendships with Joe Hasham, Bob Scipelliti and Brian Webb, the latter two acting as silent business partners for Richardson later in life. Motivated by the continued factional fighting impacting on his parents' life, Richardson joined the Monterey branch of the Labor Party in 1966, aged 17.

Having earlier dropped out of an arts degree in 1969, Richardson followed his mother's encouragement and commenced studies for a Bachelor of Laws at the University of Sydney. She would die suddenly at 42, distracting Richardson from his studies as he threw himself into union and Labor politics.

== Early political career ==
Encouraged by a Labor right-wing factional ally, Senator Kerry Sibraa, to seek election for a role as a Labor Party branch organiser in 1971, Richardson was successful, left his university studies, and discovered the powerbrokers in the New South Wales Right. He apprenticed himself to learn from these men, some of the toughest in the Labor Party, and progressed to become assistant secretary of the New South Wales Labor Party in 1976 and general secretary a little later that year, aged 26 – the youngest ever person to hold that role. During his time as secretary, he helped secure a 13-seat increase for Neville Wran's Labor Government at the 1978 New South Wales state election. John Faulkner, of Labor's socialist left faction, was Richardson's assistant secretary for eight months; so great was their mutual hatred, they did not exchange a word.

=== Influence of Daniel Casey ===
Marrying Cheryl Gardner in 1973, Richardson described the rigours of his early married life and union work to The National Times' Alan Ramsey in October 1983:

... then we got married, lived in the unit (in Ramsgate) for a while, and had a baby. We moved to a new house a quarter of a mile away. It cost me heaps. I had a mortgage I couldn't possibly afford. I remember for over a year we had a gross income of $9,000 and I was paying $4,500 on the mortgage. That was hard, very hard. We were really struggling.

Richardson later told the Woodward Royal Commission that in 1973 he met Daniel Casey, a senior figure in Labor right-wing politics, and regarded him as a friend, drank with him at the Sackville Hotel in Rozelle, near Balmain, borrowed $2,000 from him, and paid it back by cheque in two instalments. Again, Ramsay reports Richardson as saying:

Then in '76 I had this huge salary movement which made all these things (the mortgages and such) just not a problem at all."

However, Evan Whitton, a noted journalist and campaigner against organised crime, claimed that in May 1977 Richardson's wife, Cheryl, went on the payroll, at approximately $130 a week, of Casey's Balmain Welding, but did not have to attend at the office. Richardson later told the Woodward Royal Commission, it was the policy of the company not to hire office staff, so they sent the typing out to Mrs Richardson. She kept the job until about May 1979, by which time she was getting about $160 a week from Balmain Welding. Richardson's links with Casey were brought to public notice through the reconvening of the Woodward Royal Commission in 1980 due to allegations that Casey had funnelled $20,000, alleged to be a product of gambling and drugs, into the New South Wales Labor Party. Richardson told the commission on 28 March 1980 that Casey had not donated $20,000 to the Party, and the Commission found no evidence against Casey.

=== Numbers man ===
In his years working at Labor's Sussex Street offices, Richardson became renowned for an ability to bring in numbers; he was often referred to as a "numbers man" for the right wing of the New South Wales branch of Labor. Bill Hayden said that Richardson once explained to him: "... all decisions are democratically taken at a meeting of one; me." Richardson was highly effective in this position and became known as a "king maker"; three years after Richardson became party secretary, Paul Keating was elected unopposed as president of NSW Labor, succeeding John Ducker. Keating is believed to be the youngest president in the history of NSW Labor. Richardson was also instrumental in the 1983 coup that led to Bob Hawke succeeding Hayden as Leader of the Opposition, which ultimately led to Hawke becoming prime minister.

=== Enmore branch and factional fights ===
During Richardson's time as general secretary, there were significant battles over factional control of a number of inner city Labor branches. Peter Baldwin, a Labor member of the Legislative Council and a member of the socialist-left faction, was bashed by unknown assailants in his home on 16 July 1980. Baldwin had earlier initiated inquiries into "rorts" in the Enmore and other branches. Police began an investigation into the assault on Baldwin and included matters relating to the affairs of the Labor Party's Enmore branch. Five people, including Joe Meissner and Tom Domican, were charged with various offences. Richardson, in a later interview, confirmed that at the time he wrote to the attorney-general, Frank Walker, and all other cabinet ministers in the Wran government to ask that the case be dropped on the grounds that it was a Labor Party and not a police matter. Even the magistrate was approached. In dismissing the Enmore charges, the magistrate said: "It seems that some force or forces were working improperly to undermine the strength of the prosecution. I am firmly of the opinion that this matter calls for further investigation."

It was subsequently alleged by Meissner, who was at the time secretary of the Enmore branch of the Labor Party and one of the central figures in the controversy, that the bashing was undertaken by Domican, an underworld figure with close links to the right-wing faction of the New South Wales Labor Party, acting on suggestions from Richardson. Richardson, alleging that he had been defamed, commenced legal action that was eventually settled out of court in 2007 in Richardson's favour.

Richardson groomed his successor for general secretary, Stephen Loosley, who took over in 1983 following Richardson's successful nomination for the Senate.

== Parliamentary career ==
Richardson was preselected as a candidate for election to the Australian Senate following the retirement of Senator Tony Mulvihill. As the Hawke Labor opposition defeated the Fraser–Anthony Liberal–National coalition, Labor retained its five Senate seats in New South Wales, with Richardson polling the third highest quota for Labor at the 1983 double dissolution federal election. At age 33, he was the youngest ever senator elected at the time and initially sat on Senate committees on electoral reform, regulations and ordinances, finance and government operations and estimates in the first term of parliament. His work with Victorian senator Robert Ray on the joint select committee on electoral reform saw the establishment of the independent Australian Electoral Commission, the number of members in House of Representatives increase from 125 to 148, number of senators increase from 64 to 76 and the introduction of the group voting ticket in the Senate at the 1984 election.

Richardson was re-elected to the Senate at the 1984, 1987 and 1993 federal elections.

=== 1987–1990 ===
Following the 1987 federal election, Richardson was appointed Minister for the Environment and the Arts, a position in the outer ministry in the Third Hawke ministry. In January 1988, he was elevated to Cabinet as the Minister for the Arts, Sport, the Environment, Tourism and Territories, replacing John Brown. As the Hawke government sought to claim the "green agenda" against the growing influence of the Australian Greens and the Wilderness Society, Richardson's period as environment minister was notable for the federal government intervening in Tasmanian state planning issues and blocking the Wesley Vale pulp mill. As Minister for the Environment, Richardson also advocated for and was successful in inscribing the Daintree Rainforest and surrounding areas on the UNESCO World Heritage List in 1988, and a protected status for Kakadu National Park, prior to inscribing Stage 2 of Kakadu NP on the World Heritage List in 1987. Some media commentators speculated that Richardson's motives for these changes were driven, not by a concern for the environment and heritage of the lands, but by purely political motives:

He was the mastermind of the political maneuvering of the ALP government which has made the environmental movement an increasingly ineffective force in Australian politics..... The real measure of his environmental contributions is not the individual act of conservation here or there but what his political maneuvering has meant for the environmental movement and the environment...

As Minister for Sport, Richardson oversaw the merging of the Australian Institute of Sport into the Australian Sports Commission and the Drugs in Sport Senate Inquiry which led to the establishment of the Australian Sports Drug Agency in 1990.

In 1990, a looming tight election saw Richardson tasked with responsibility to attract second-preference votes from the Australian Democrats and other environmental parties. Richardson claimed this as a major factor in the government's narrow re-election in 1990.

=== 1990–1993 ===
Richardson felt that the importance of his contribution to Labor's victory would automatically entitle him to the ministerial portfolio of his choice—Transport and Communications. He was shocked, however, at what he perceived as Hawke's ingratitude in allocating him initially Defence, and then later, Social Security instead.

Prior to Richardson being appointed Minister for Social Security, he was offered the post of high commissioner in London. It was believed that Hawke wanted Richardson out of politics altogether.

Richardson vowed—in a telephone conversation with Peter Barron, a former Hawke political staffer—to do "whatever it takes" to "get" Hawke. He immediately transferred his allegiance to Keating and subsequently claimed credit for playing a vital role in Keating's campaign for the leadership as a numbers man. Interviewed by John Laws a few months following the announcement of the fourth Hawke ministry, Richardson commented on his new portfolio:

When I got it, I was pretty shocked – I must say it's not something I'd ever expected – and so you have to sit down and wonder what the hell you're going to do. But as I've been getting into it in the last few months, then you realize that it's just not the case that you spend lots of money – about one in four of the government dollars – but the issues are just so wide ranging. Yesterday, I was in Alice Springs, talking to people about the difficulties that they're having with Aboriginal alcoholism and violence – the kind of problems that it's bringing – and then you're back into discussions on – race back to Cabinet for discussions on migration and what kind of social security benefits people might get, and then you're talking about age pensions, this morning, on another program about some people's concerns. It's just so big. I'll get interested, don't worry.

Richardson's switch to support Keating helped the latter to become prime minister in December 1991. In the first Keating ministry, Richardson was appointed to his coveted portfolio of Transport and Communications and the additional role of Vice-President of the Executive Council – earning him the nickname, Minister for Channel Nine – due to his close relationship with media magnate, Kerry Packer. Keating was content to have Richardson by his side, organising the Labor Right faction numbers; considering Richardson good in this role but not necessarily suited to significant office.

In May 1992, Richardson was forced to resign his commission as a minister following revelations that he had used his position and influence to help his cousin by marriage, Gregory Symons. Symons had been arrested in the Marshall Islands for forging government documents relating to a migration scam and was later subsequently jailed. The event was known as the Marshall Islands affair. A judicial inquiry was necessary to resolve allegations of ministerial impropriety where it was alleged that Richardson attempted to help Symons avoid penalty. Richardson sat out the remainder of this term of parliament on the backbench.

=== 1993–1994 ===
Following the 1993 election, Richardson was returned to cabinet in the second Keating ministry as Minister for Health. In a highly publicised tour, of the Northern Territory and following the Mabo decision and the lodging of the Wik claim, Richardson promised to make health care the key components of a new social justice package being negotiated with Aboriginal Australians. Richardson went on national television and said that $1.3 billion was needed in new funding and that he would deliver it. Mike Codd, Secretary of the Department of the Prime Minister and Cabinet under Hawke described Richardson during his term as Minister for Health as being "passionate about Aboriginal health. Genuinely passionate. He could have achieved an awful lot in that portfolio, but he had to resign."

A little under a year later, he assumed additional responsibilities of the Environment, Sport and Territories, following the resignation of Ros Kelly over the sports rorts affair – ironically over the $30m Community Cultural, Recreational and Sporting Facilities Program initiated by Richardson in 1988 when he was Minister for Sport.

Four weeks later, on 25 March 1994, Richardson resigned both positions and retired from parliament, citing ill-health. However, at the same time, allegations were mounting that he was involved in acquiring prostitutes for his personal use, supplied by Robert Burgess and Nick Karlos. Karlos reportedly had been accused of having serious criminal connections; meanwhile Richardson had signed a letter of support on ministerial letterhead for Burgess which was then used to set up a meeting between Richardson and the senior executive of a US defence company, where Richardson discussed Burgess' interests. Richardson denied the allegations.

== Post-parliament career ==
In his post-parliament career, Richardson was primarily known by the Australian public through election night television coverage. He was a political commentator for the Seven Network (having previously appeared on the Nine Network) and broadcaster with 2GB. He also authored his memoirs titled Whatever it Takes and published by Bantam Books in 1994. For the 2000 Summer Olympics in Sydney he was the chairman of the Olympic ticketing operations, mayor of the Olympic village and had a seat on the Sydney Organising Committee of the Olympic Games (SOCOG).

In 1999, as chairman of the Olympics ticketing operations, Richardson oversaw a deal in which over 500,000 selected tickets were withheld from the public ticket lottery and reserved for high-paying package-deal customers. This resulted in considerable public criticism at the time and the tickets were eventually made available to the general public.

He continued a role as a broker in other aspects of New South Wales public life, including the high-profile contract dispute between the National Rugby League player Sonny Bill Williams and his club, the Canterbury-Bankstown Bulldogs in 2008. Richardson was influential in the election of Anthony Albanese and Richard Marles as leader and deputy leader of the Labor Party, respectively.

=== Cash for comment ===
Richardson was implicated in the "cash for comment" scandal in Australian radio broadcasting, where prominent radio personalities – such as John Laws and Alan Jones – were found to have been promoting certain companies while on the companies' payroll and keeping the deals secret from listeners to make it look like the comments were genuine opinion or editorial pieces, or that they had demanded payments from companies in exchange for refraining from making negative comments. Richardson was being paid by Publishing and Broadcasting Limited (PBL), and spruiked for PBL-owned companies the Nine Network and Crown Casino during his radio show.

=== Tax evasion ===
In 2006, Richardson became embroiled in allegations of tax evasion involving Rene Rivkin. On 27 September 2006, Justice James Allsop, of the Federal Court, released a document showing that Richardson had an undeclared Swiss bank account containing $1.4 million.

He was one of the shareholders of the Offset Alpine Printing company. In October 2008, Richardson agreed to pay an undisclosed sum to end his ongoing A$2.3 million dispute with the Australian Taxation Office (ATO). The ATO took action against Richardson in 2005 after Rivkin, a stockbroker, had told Swiss investigators that Rivkin, businessman Trevor Kennedy and Richardson were the secret owners of a $27 million stake in Offset Alpine. The ATO had sought $700,000 that it claimed was owed in unpaid taxes, along with a $1.6 million interest and penalty payment.

=== Political commentator ===
Richardson was a political commentator for both the Seven Network and Sky News Australia, where he was commonly referred to as "Richo". For Seven, he provided frequent commentary on political issues to Seven News, Sunrise and The Morning Show as well as co-hosting election night coverage. On Sky News, Richardson was a regular contributor to the channel's various panel programs, before being given his own weekly panel show named Richo in 2011.

From 2013, Richardson was given a second program on Sky News co-hosting with Alan Jones named Richo + Jones. The episode of Richo + Jones on 22 April 2014 was the twentieth most watched show on subscription television, reaching 39,000 viewers, and was the channel's second highest broadcast that day. An episode on 17 June, featuring a live interview with Clive Palmer, was the seventeenth-most watched show on subscription television and the most watched broadcast on Sky News with 43,000 viewers. Richo finished broadcasting in 2021.

== Personal life, health and death ==
=== Family ===
Richardson married twice. His first marriage was to Cheryl Ruth Gardner on 18 April 1973 at his alma mater. Together they had two children, son Matthew and daughter Kate. He married Amanda Richardson in 2007, with whom he had another son, D'Arcy.

=== Health and illnesses ===
Richardson was diagnosed in 1999 with chondrosarcoma, a rare bone cancer, and had five major tumours removed in three operations, the last in 2012.

Seven months of chemotherapy failed to shrink another tumour on his pelvic wall. His doctors were concerned that as it became bigger it could invade his organs. They told him that he required radical surgery, known as pelvic exenteration. Richardson was quoted as saying: "They say it's all got to come out – bowel, bladder, prostate, rectum – the lot."

In April 2016, Richardson temporarily stepped down from his two Sky News programs to undergo major surgery. Weeks after the operation had occurred, it was reported that he suffered breathing difficulties and was moved back to the intensive care unit. Richardson returned to Sky News after a two-month post-surgery recovery period in time to cover the 2016 federal election on 2 July 2016.

Richardson died in his Sydney residence at approximately 3:50 am on 8 November 2025, at the age of 76 after sustained influenza and pneumonia. The Australian Federal Government provided a state funeral for Richardson, held on 9 December 2025 in Sydney. According to the executors of his estate, Richardson died penniless and even the $18,500 bill for the wake at Sydney's Golden Century restaurant remained unpaid after his death.

== Bibliography ==
=== Books ===
- Richardson, Graham (1994). Whatever It Takes. Sydney: Bantam Books. ISBN 1-86359-332-2.

=== Essays and other contributions ===
- Richardson, Graham (March 2003). "Groundswell". Correspondence. Quarterly Essay. 9: 74–79. ISBN 9781863953399.
- Richardson, Graham (December 2005). "Relaxed & Comfortable". Correspondence. Quarterly Essay. 20. ISBN 9781863951340.

Parliament of Australia
Preceded by Tony Mulvihill	Senator for New South Wales; 1983–1994	Succeeded by Michael Forshaw
Political offices
Preceded by Barry Cohen as Minister for Arts, Heritage and the Environment	Minister for the Environment and the Arts (Note: Serving as the junior minister in the Outer Ministry.); 1987–1988	Succeeded by Gary Punch as Minister for the Arts and Territories
Preceded by John Brown	Minister for the Arts, Sport, the Environment, Tourism and Territories; 1988–1990	Succeeded by Ros Kelly
Preceded by Brian Howe	Minister for Social Security; 1990–1991	Succeeded by Neal Blewett
Preceded by John Kerin	Minister for Transport and Communications; 1991–1992	Succeeded by Bob Collins
Preceded by Kim Beazley	Vice-President of the Executive Council; 1991–1992	Succeeded by Ralph Willis
Preceded by Brian Howe as Minister for Health, Housing and Community Services	Minister for Health; 1993–1994	Succeeded by Carmen Lawrence as Minister for Human Services and Health
Preceded by Ros Kelly	Minister for the Environment, Sport and Territories; 1994	Succeeded by John Faulkner
Party political offices
Preceded by Geoff Cahill	General Secretary of the New South Wales Labor Party; 1976–1983	Succeeded by Stephen Loosley
Notes and references
1.
