= Offset Alpine fire =

1993 Australian fire

Coordinates: 33°51′05.18″S 151°02′32.58″E

The Offset Alpine fire was a 1993 fire that destroyed a Sydney printing plant owned by the company Offset Alpine Printing Ltd. Investigations of the incident by the police and by the Australian Securities & Investments Commission spanned over ten years, amid suspicions that the printing plant was burnt down as part of an insurance fraud. It also gained attention because of the high profile of individuals involved.

== Background ==
In 1992 Stroika, an Australian Securities Exchange listed company controlled by Rene Rivkin, bought the Offset Alpine printing firm from Kerry Packer for $15.3 million. On Christmas Eve, 1993, the firm's sole asset, the printing plant, was destroyed by fire. It had been insured at replacement value ($53.2 million), more than three times its purchase price, and shares skyrocketed. The fire was blamed on a staff barbecue, but suspicions of arson have persisted.

In March 1995, in Rene Rivkin's investment column in The Canberra Times, he recommended purchases of shares in 'my very own company, Offset Alpine Group,' with 'profit up from 4.6¢ a share to 13.8¢ a share, an interim dividend up to 100 per cent from 2¢ a share to 4¢ a share.' The share price in October 1995 climbed 29c to $2.30 after shareholders accepted a $2.30-a-share takeover offer from Kalamazoo Holdings.

Known investors included:

- Rene Rivkin, a Sydney stockbroker and entrepreneur
- Graham Richardson, a former Labor Senator and associate of Kerry Packer
- Eddie Obeid, a Labor politician
- Trevor Kennedy, a businessman and former Packer executive
- Rodney Adler, an entrepreneur
- Sean Howard, a businessman and one of the founders of internet company OzEmail
- Bill Hayden, a former Labor leader and Governor-General of Australia
- Ray Martin, a television personality who appeared on the Packers' Nine Network

The Australian Securities & Investments Commission (ASIC) commenced an investigation into the ownership of a 38% stake in the company via secret Swiss bank accounts. Rivkin denied any knowledge of the ownership of the stake at the time, but in 2003 ASIC discovered that he himself, in partnership with Richardson and Kennedy, had been using Swiss bank accounts to trade in Offset Alpine and other companies. Rivkin committed suicide in 2005, before the investigation was completed, after being jailed on an unrelated insider trading matter.

In January 2006 after a two-year legal battle, ASIC gained access to the relevant Swiss banking records. In September 2006 it was revealed that Richardson had almost $1.5 million in Swiss accounts which he had failed to declare to the Australian Taxation Office. In 2010 ASIC discontinued its investigation and ceased the provision of legal funds for court cases in Switzerland, where a Swiss bank refused to disclose the details of Rivkin's financial records (Swiss authorities also refused to take action against the bank). An amount of $A11 million that was held in Swiss bank accounts remains outstanding upon the closure of the investigation in April 2013.
