= Rene Rivkin =

Chinese-born Australian businessman (1944–2005)

- Born: Rene Walter Rivkin; 6 June 1944; Shanghai, China
- Died: 1 May 2005 (aged 60); Darling Point, Australia
- Occupations: Stockbroker, investor and entrepreneur
- Spouse: Gayle Jenkins
- Children: 4 sons, 1 daughter
- Parent(s): Walter Rivkin, Rachel Rivkin

Rene Walter Rivkin (6 June 1944 – 1 May 2005) was an Australian entrepreneur, investor, investment adviser and stockbroker. He was convicted of insider trading in 2003 and sentenced to nine months of periodic detention.

== Early life ==
Rene Walter Rivkin was born 6 June 1944 in Shanghai in what was then Japanese-occupied China, to Russian-Jewish parents. His father, Walter, was a Georgian-born trader who had fled to China in the 1920s to escape the Bolsheviks. The elder Rivkin had also once been a champion boxer in Shanghai. The family emigrated to Australia in 1951 and Rivkin attended Sydney Boys High School. In accordance with his father's wishes, he studied law at the University of Sydney and went on to become the youngest-ever member of the Sydney Stock Exchange.

== Career ==
Rivkin was a well-known stockbroker and entrepreneur, whose career spanned over 30 years. In December 1985, he was voted Business Review Weekly magazine's Stockbroker of the Year. Later, he gained recognition with his publication of the Rivkin Report, in which he would advise what stocks to buy and sell, and provide market analysis. He became famous in the Australian media for his entrepreneurial flair and wealth. He was associated with leading political, media and business figures in Australia from 1982 to 1999 and became a household name. He was appointed a member of the special committee to select works of the art for the Bicentenary Darling Harbour redevelopment chaired by Neville Wran with the State Gallery director Edmund Capon, journalist Lenore Nicklin, critic and art collector Sandra McGrath, and Bob Pentecost, general manager of the Darling Harbour Authority.

Rivkin sold his share of stockbroking firm Rivkin James Capel after an operation to remove a tumour, and amidst the 1987 stockmarket collapse. He was the chairman and chief investor in the printing plant that was destroyed in the Offset Alpine fire on 24 December 1993. This resulted in an insurance payout of $53 million. Rivkin owned and part-owned many businesses, including a half share of John Singleton Advertising between 1986 and 1991 with his friend John Singleton. He subsequently founded another stockbroking firm.

== Conviction for insider trading ==
In April 2003, following a long-running investigation by the Australian Securities & Investments Commission (ASIC), Rivkin was found guilty of insider trading, having purchased the Qantas shares after being made aware of information in relation to an impending merger of Qantas and Impulse Airlines. He was charged with using the confidential and market-sensitive information, having purchased—on behalf of Rivkin Investments—50,000 Qantas shares on 24 April 2001, just hours after speaking to the executive chairman of Impulse, Gerry McGowan. The trade resulted in a profit of $2,664.94.

Rivkin was convicted and sentenced to nine months' periodic detention on weekends. His sentence was delayed so he could undergo urgent surgery for a meningioma. His period of custody was punctuated with time served at Long Bay Psychiatric Hospital. After serving two days of his sentence at Sydney's Silverwater Correctional Complex, Rivkin collapsed and was hospitalised.

== Death ==
Banned for life from having a stockbroking licence following the serving of his sentence, Rivkin retired from business life. During this time, he suffered from several conditions. Since 1986, Rivkin had been receiving treatment for benign brain tumours, a gangrenous gall bladder, deep vein thrombosis and bipolar disorder. During interviews Rivkin mentioned that he had contemplated suicide. In early September 2004 he attempted suicide. He later moved from his Point Piper home to the Darling Point home of his elderly mother, where he killed himself on 1 May 2005.

His funeral was held at Eastern Suburbs Memorial Park where his body was cremated on 6 May 2005. He was survived by his wife and five children.

== Posthumous investigation ==
Following Rivkin's death, a global investigation was launched to ascertain the location of funds associated with the deceased businessman's estate. The high-profile investigation revealed Rivkin had been trading in secret through complex offshore dealings, despite being banned, and led to the Australian Taxation Office (ATO) claiming A$18 million in unpaid taxes and penalties. This forced the executors of the estate to declare it bankrupt, and a lengthy international effort ensued to recover the proceeds of Rivkin's illegal trading. As of 16 April 2013, the ATO ceased the provision of the legal funds for court cases in Switzerland, where a Swiss bank refused to disclose the details of Rivkin's financial records (Swiss authorities also refused to take action against the bank). An amount of $A11 million that was held in Swiss bank accounts remains outstanding upon the closure of the investigation in April 2013.
